= Bihari cuisine =

Culinary tradition

Bihari cuisine is eaten mainly in the eastern Indian state of Bihar, as well as in the places where people originating from the state of Bihar have settled: Eastern Uttar Pradesh, Bangladesh, Nepal, Mauritius, South Africa, Fiji, some cities of Pakistan, Guyana, Trinidad and Tobago, Suriname, Jamaica, and the Caribbean. Bihari cuisine includes Angika cuisine, Bhojpuri cuisine, Maithil cuisine and Magahi cuisine.

The cuisine of Bihar is largely similar to North Indian cuisine and East Indian cuisines. It is highly seasonal; watery foods such as watermelon and sharbat made from the pulp of the wood-apple fruit are consumed mainly in the summer months, while dry foods such as preparations made of sesame seeds and poppy seeds are consumed more frequently in the winter months.

Bihari cuisine include litti chokha, a baked salted wheat-flour cake filled with sattu (baked chickpea flour) and some special spices, which is served with baigan bharta, made of roasted eggplant (brinjal) and tomatoes. Dairy products are consumed frequently throughout the year, including dahi (yogurt), spiced buttermilk (known as mattha), ghee, lassi and butter.

There are numerous Bihari meat dishes, with chicken and mutton being the most common. Fish dishes are especially common in the Mithila region of North Bihar due to the number of rivers, such as the Sone, Gandak, Ganges and Koshi. Among meat dishes, meat saalan is a popular dish made of mutton or goat curry with cubed potatoes in garam masala. Dalpuri is another popular dish in Bihar. It is salted wheat-flour bread, filled with boiled, crushed, and fried gram pulses.

Malpua is a popular sweet dish of Bihar, prepared by a mixture of maida, milk, bananas, cashew nuts, peanuts, raisins, sugar, water, and green cardamom. Another notable sweet dish of Bihar is balushahi, which is prepared by a specially treated combination of maida and sugar along with ghee, and the well-known sweet khaja is made from flour, vegetable fat, and sugar. Silao near Nalanda is famous for its production. During the festival of Chhath, thekua, a sweet dish made of ghee, jaggery, and whole-meal flour, flavoured with aniseed, is made.

== Bihari thali ==
As the seasons change so does the Bihari thali, every 3–4 months. The constants are rice, roti, achar, chatni, dals and milk products, with some variation.

For the frying and tempering (chhounkna / tadka) of certain vegetable dishes, Bihari cuisine makes use of vegetable oil or mustard oil and panch phoron — literally the "five spices": fennel seed (saunf), black mustard seed (sarson), fenugreek seed (methi), cumin seed (jeera) and nigella seed (kalonji or mangraeel). There is a lot of light frying (bhoonjnaa) in Bihari cuisine.

One remarkable tradition is "smoked food", referring to the use of smoked red chilli to infuse a strong aroma in food. Smoked chilli is used in preparing chokhaa, i.e. mashed brinjals / potatoes / tomatoes, either single or combined. Smoked chilli is also used in preparing kadam chutney (the kadam is a common fruit that is sweet-sour in taste).

== Traditional cuisine ==
Traditional Bihari cuisine
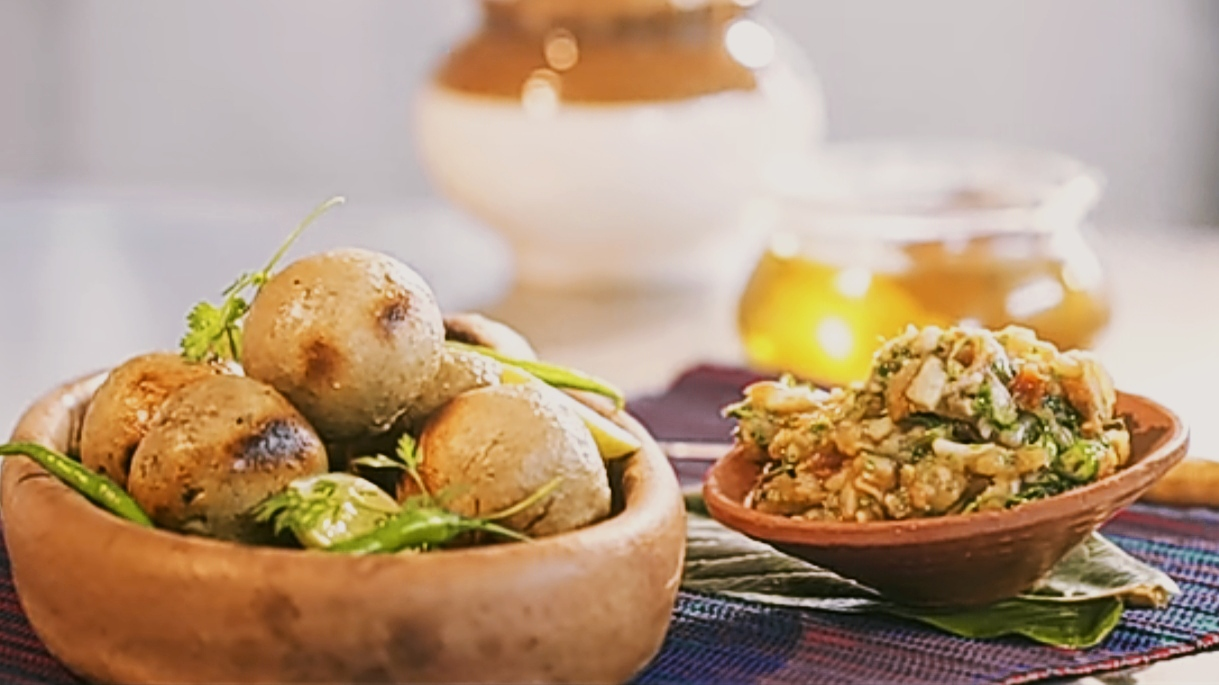
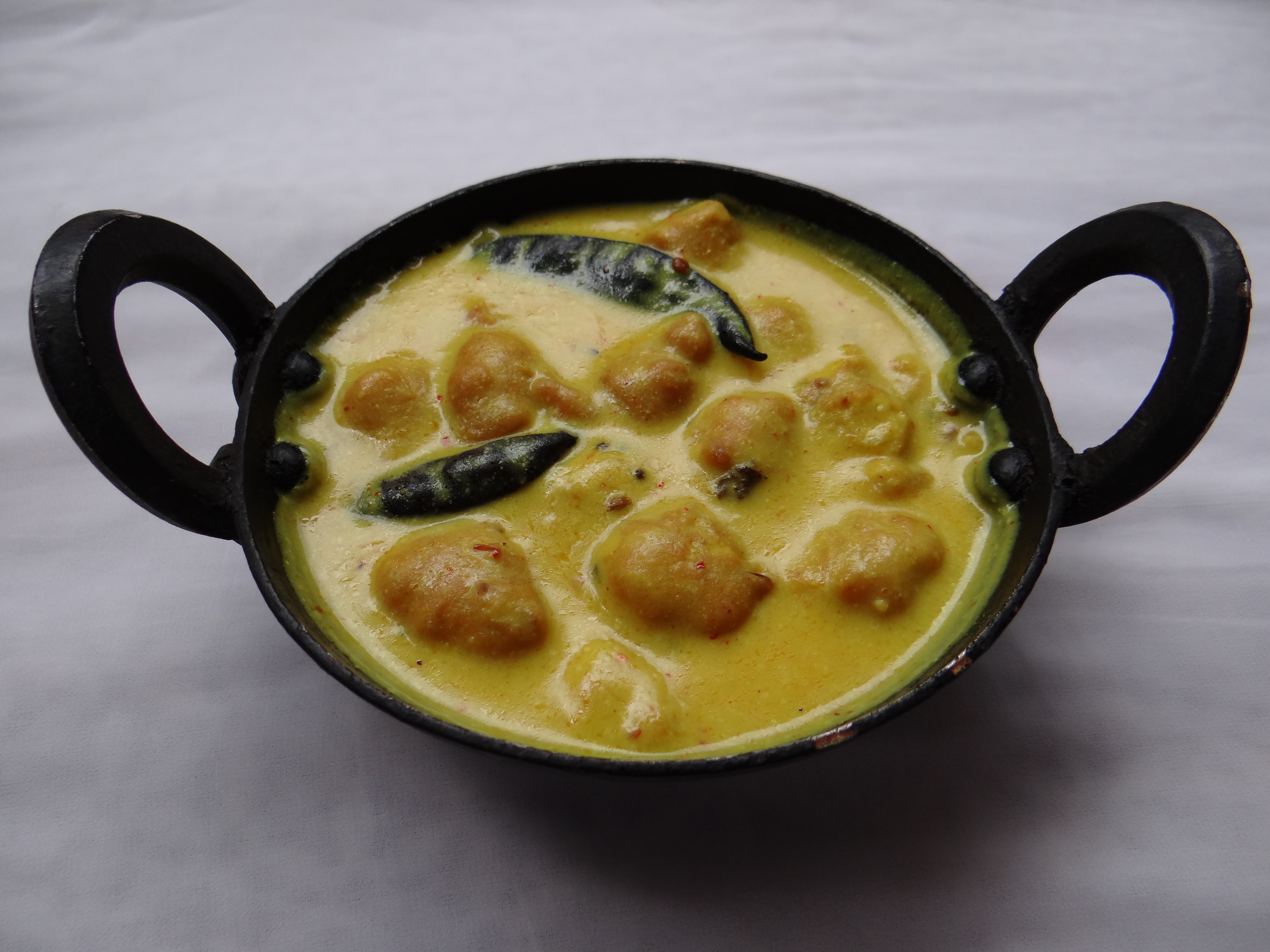
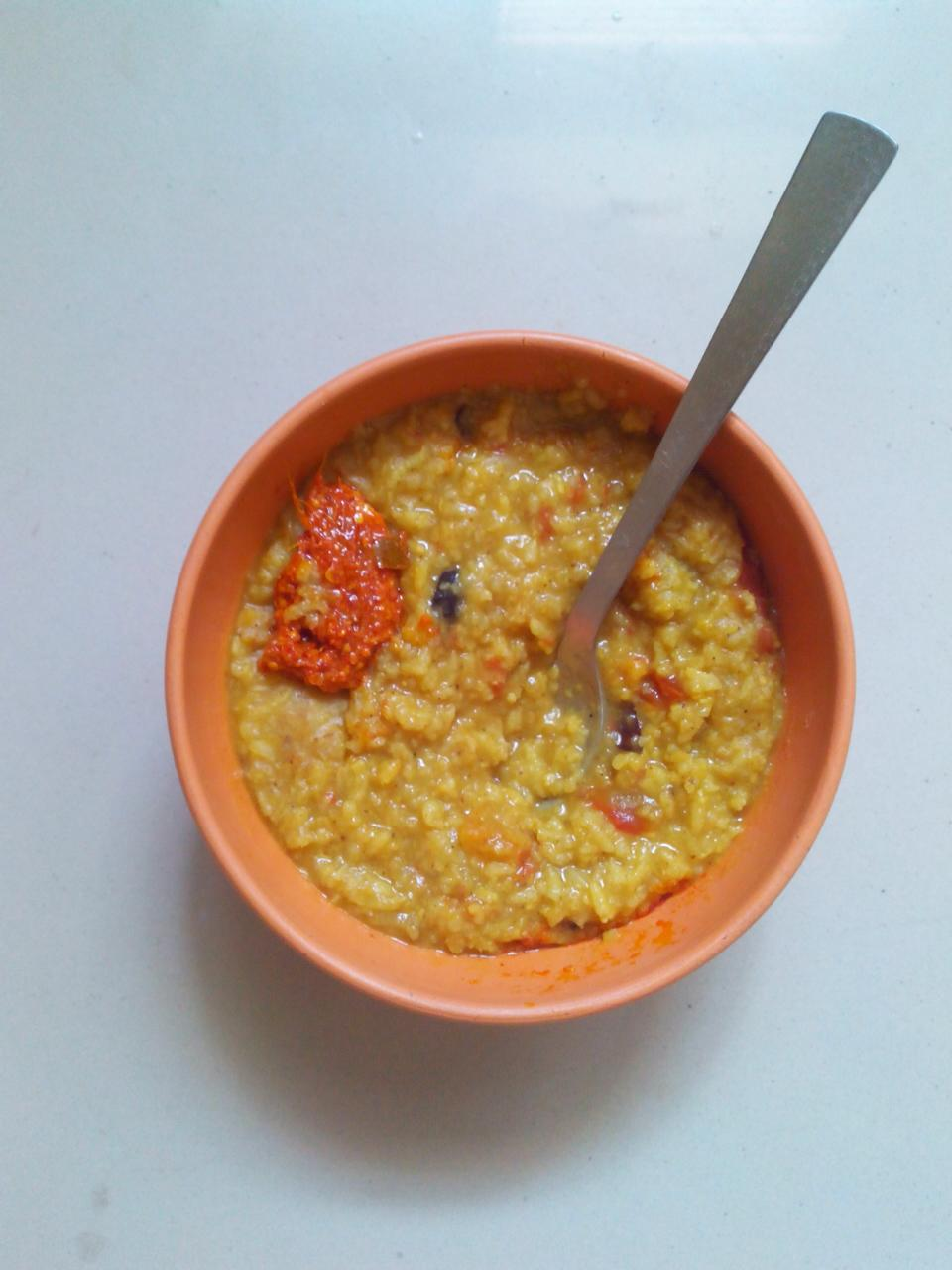
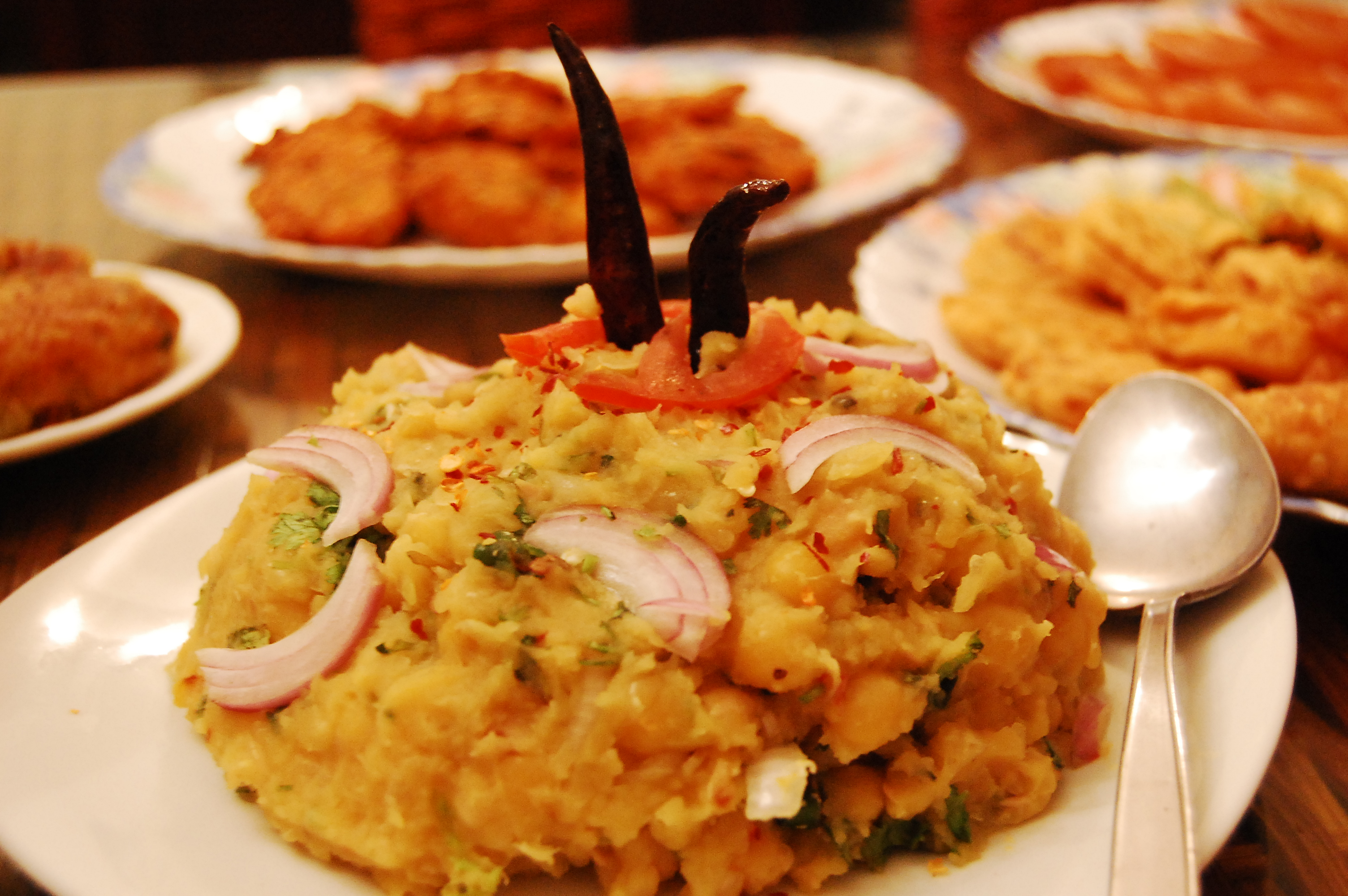
Litti, Kadhi bari, Ghugni, Khichdi
- Kadhi bari - These fried soft dumplings made of besan (gram flour) are cooked in a spicy gravy of yogurt and besan. They go well with plain rice.
- Khichdi - A mix of rice, dal and several vegetables, steamed together to give a distinctive taste of different ingredients combined in one dish. It is often topped up with ghee.
- Ghugni - A preparation made of black grams soaked (either lightly or overnight) in water and then sautéed in mustard oil in a wok. All kinds of garam masala made as paste on a sil is used for flavouring; chana is also ground to form a paste used as thickener. This thickens the masala and makes gravy as per desire. After proper seasoning and bhunjana, water is added to the mix for gravy as desired.
- Pittha - A sort of dumpling that can be either salty or sweet. It is a semi-circular or ball-shaped preparation whose crust is made of soft rice flour and filled with preparations made of channa daal lentil paste also known as Dal Pitha, or poppy seeds and gur (jaggery), then steamed in water or milk and allowed to thicken.
- Sattu - Powdered baked gram, an energy-giving food usually mixed with water or milk. Sometimes, sattu mixed with spices is used to prepare stuffed chapattis, locally known as makuni roti.
- Dhuska - A deep-fried item prepared from a mixture of powdered rice and ghee, and salted.
- Litti - Powdered baked gram is mixed with chopped onions, green chillies, lemon juice, and coriander leaves. This mixture is filled inside atta and either barbecued over coal or deep-fried with oil. Best accompanied with ghee, curd and baigan chokha or aloo chokha.

== Regional ==
Bihar's regional cuisine
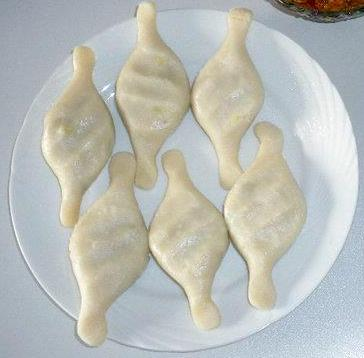
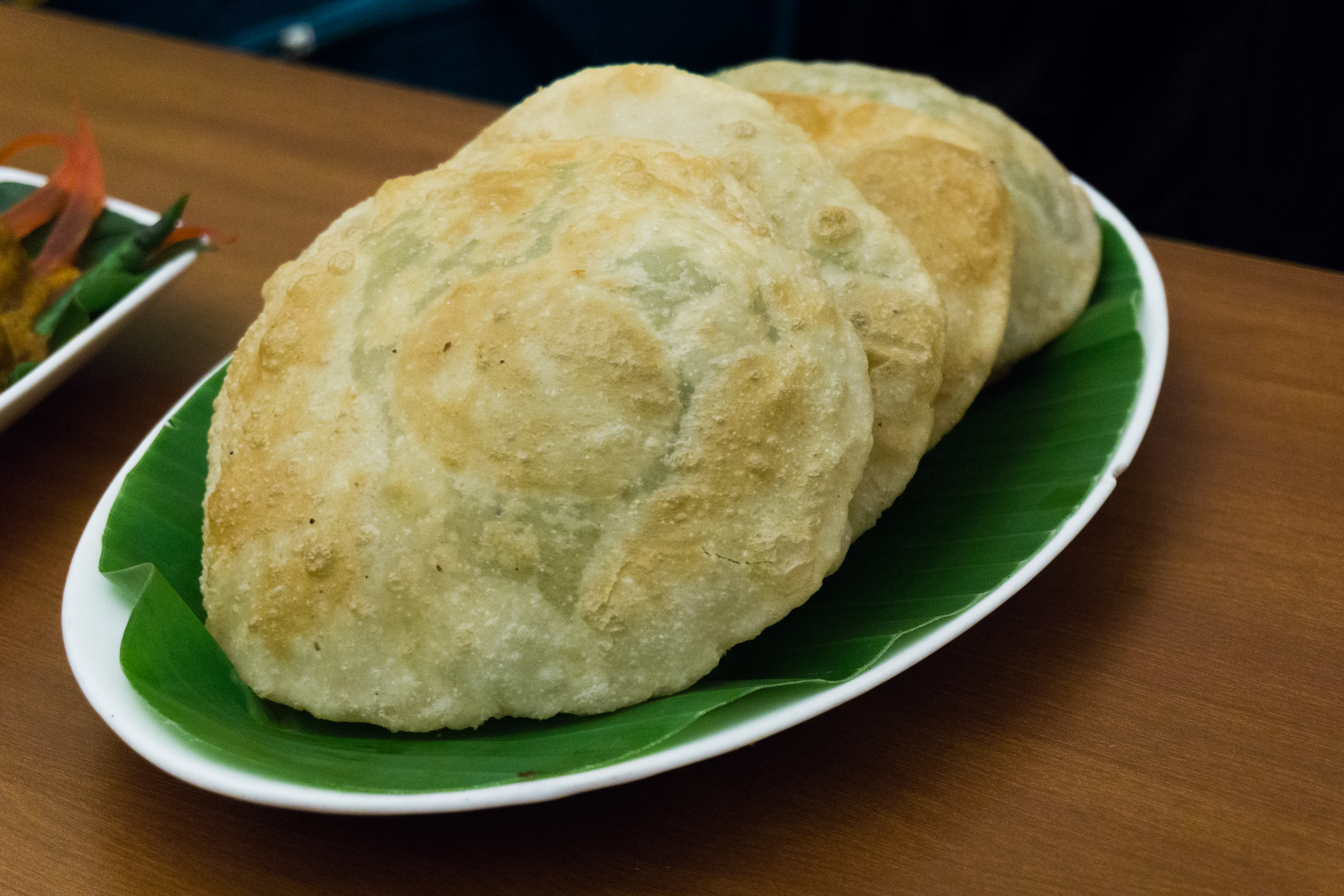
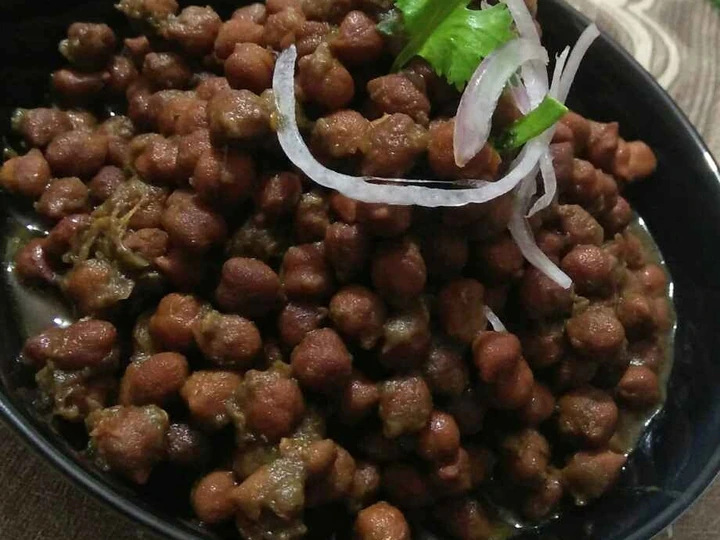
L : Bagiya is a regional delicacy of the Mithila L : Kachori is a regional snack of the Bhojpur L:Ghugni-Mudi is a regional breakfast of Anga
- Angika cuisine predominantly consumed in the Anga region, is characterized by the use of mustard oil, fish, and bamboo shoots. The famous Bihari Fish Curry and Sarse Baingan (a mustard preparation of eggplant) are beloved Angika delicacies. Other Angika cuisines are Ghugni-Mudi, Thekua.
- Bhojpuri cuisine is a style of food preparation common amongst the Bhojpuri people who reside in the Bhojpuri region of India and Nepal. Bhojpuri foods are mostly mild and are less hot in term of spices used, but could be hotter and spicier according to individual preference. The food is tailor-made for Bhojpuri lifestyle in which the rural folk expend many calories in the fields.
- Maithil cuisine also known as Mithila cuisine, is a part of Indian and Nepalese cuisine. It is the traditional cooking style of Maithils residing in the Mithila region of India and Nepal. Maithil cuisine comprises a broad repertoire of rice, wheat, fish and meat dishes and the use of various spices, herbs and natural edibles. The cuisine is categorized by types of food for various events, from banquets, to weddings and parties, festival foods, and travel foods.
- Magahi cuisine. (Hindi: मगही खाना) is a style of food preparation common amongst the Magahis living in Magadh region of Bihar, India. The food is tailor-made for Magadhi lifestyle. Magahi people take pride in celebrating various festivals and religious rites with food; as a result, their food resembles the delicacies offered to deities.

== Appetizers ==
Bihari Appetizers
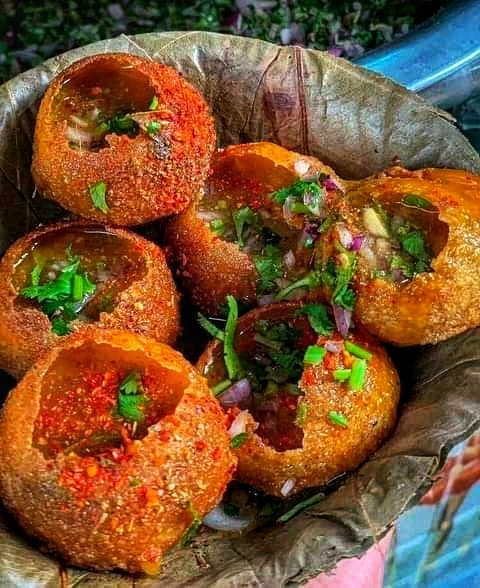
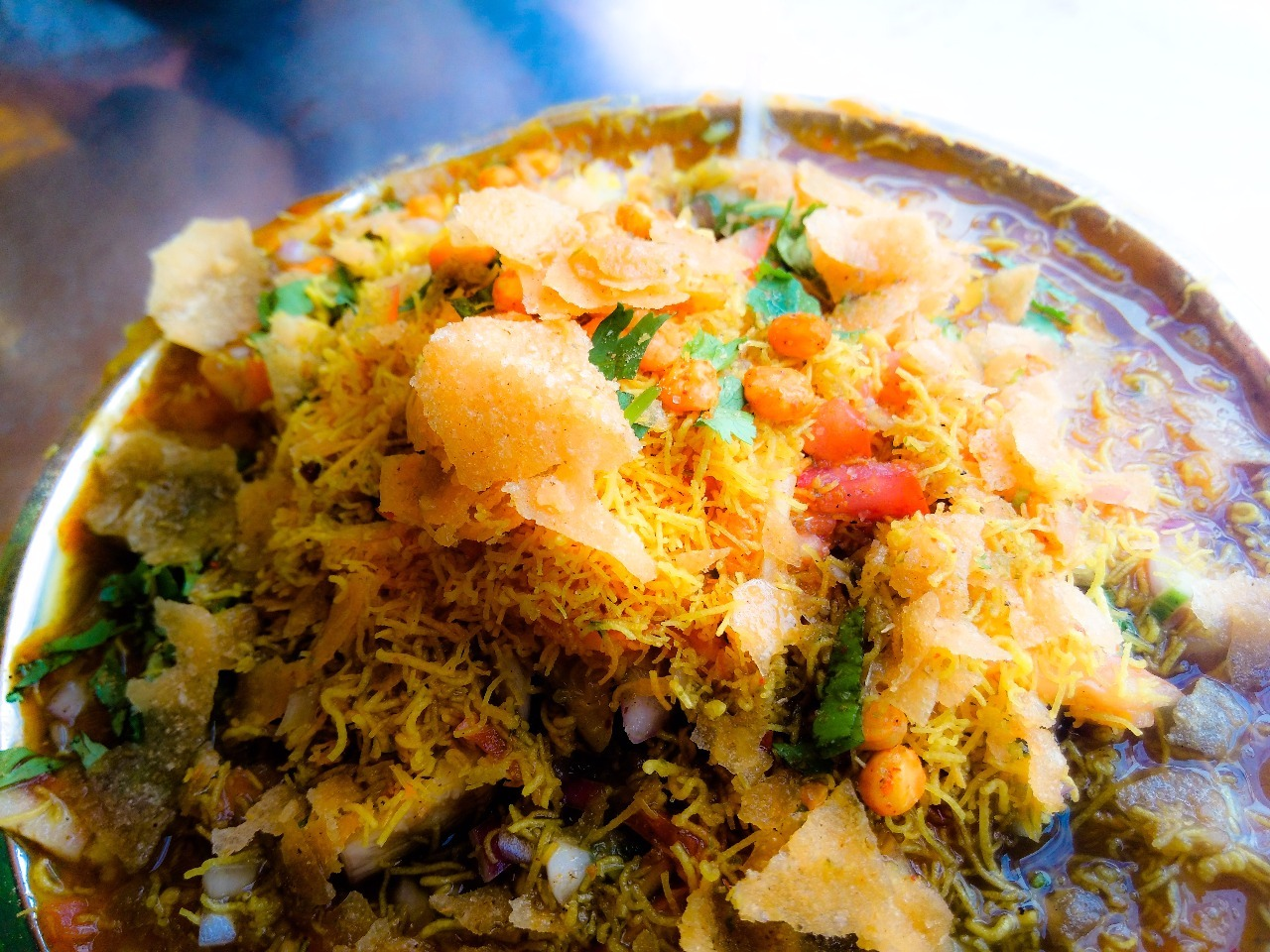
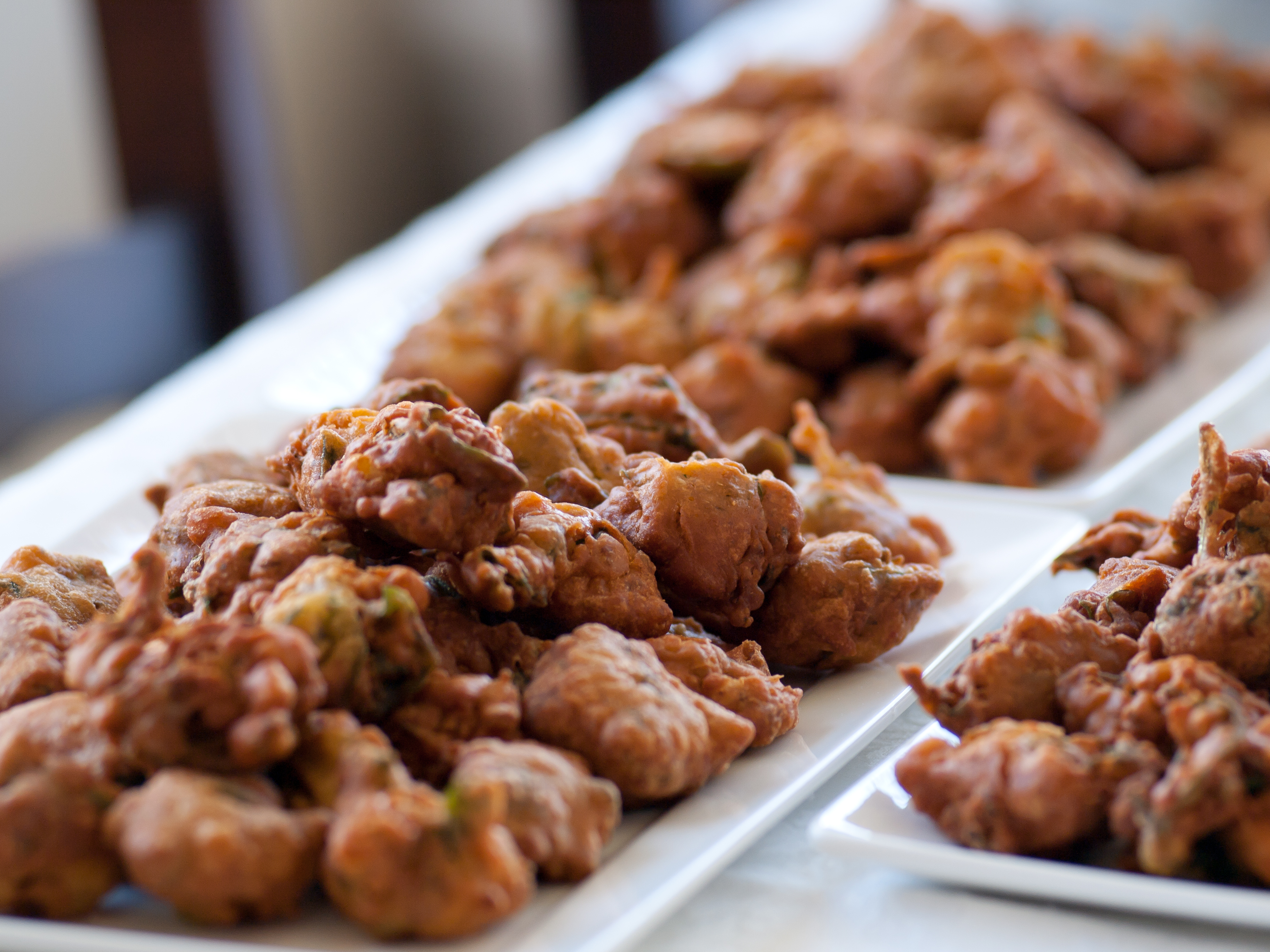
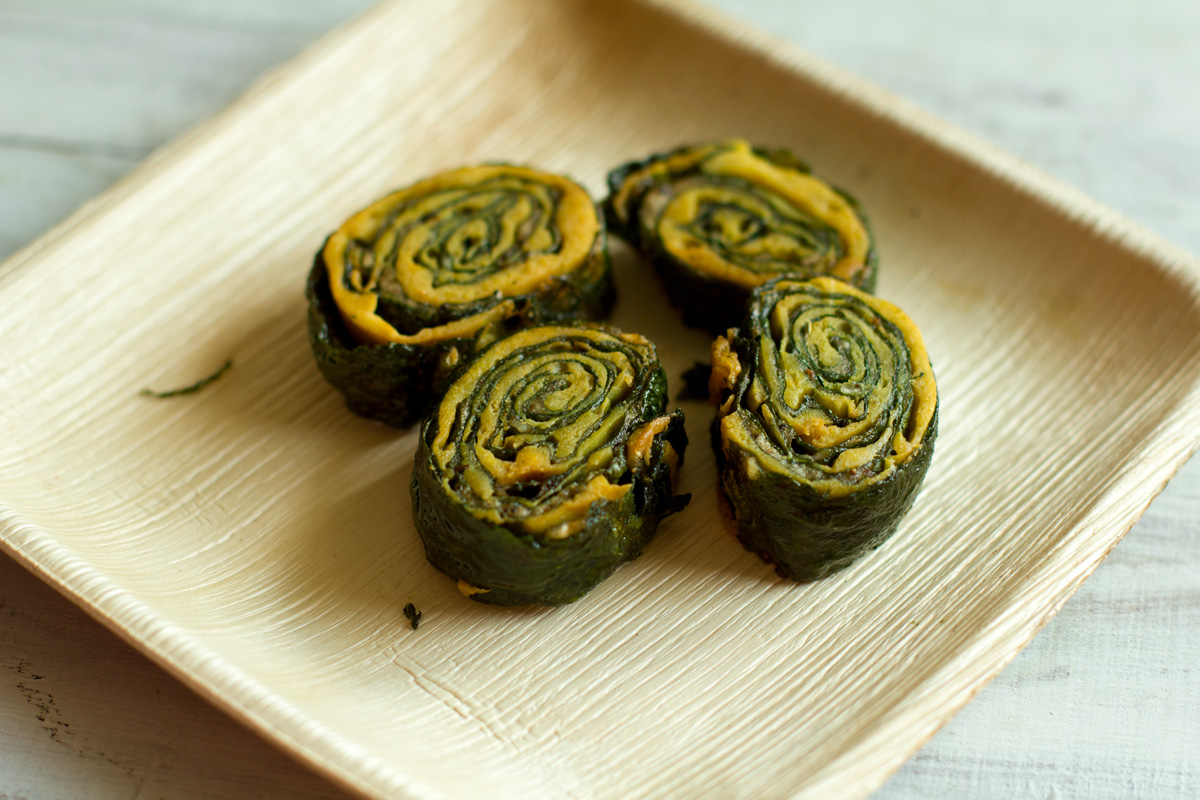
Phuchka, Chaat, Pakoda, Kachri
- Chaat
- Puchka/Ghup Chup/Pani Puri
- Chatni
- Jhal murhi
- Dahi bada
- Pakora
- Raita
- Tarua
- Kachauri
- Kachri

== Breads ==
Traditional Bihari Bread
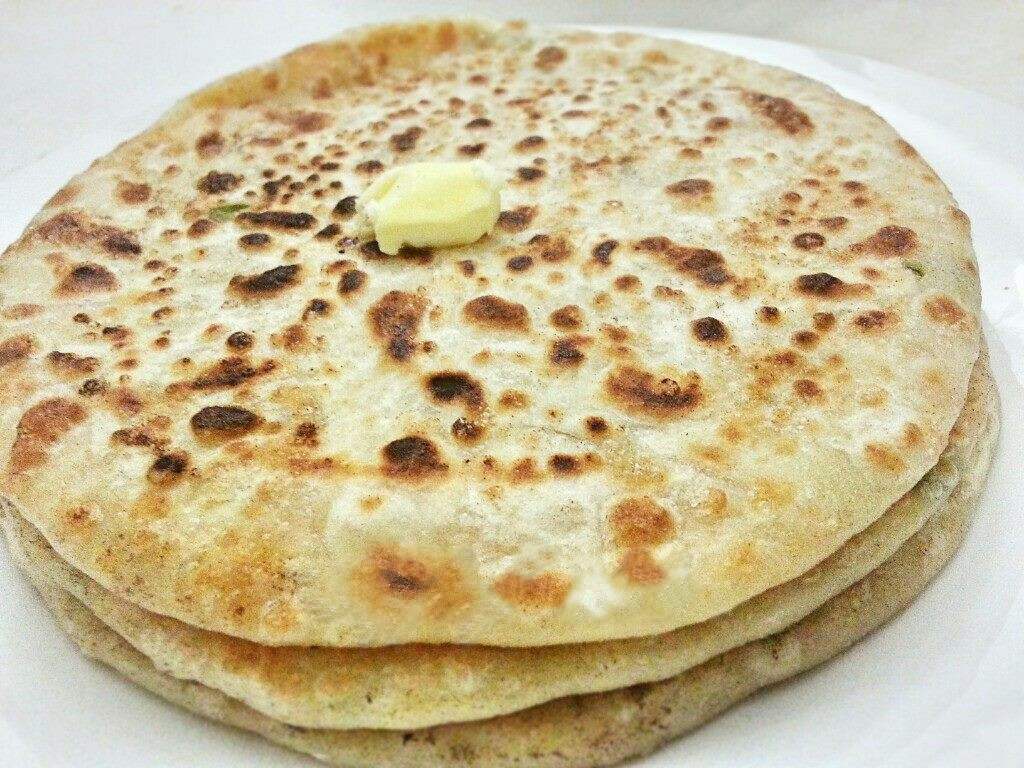
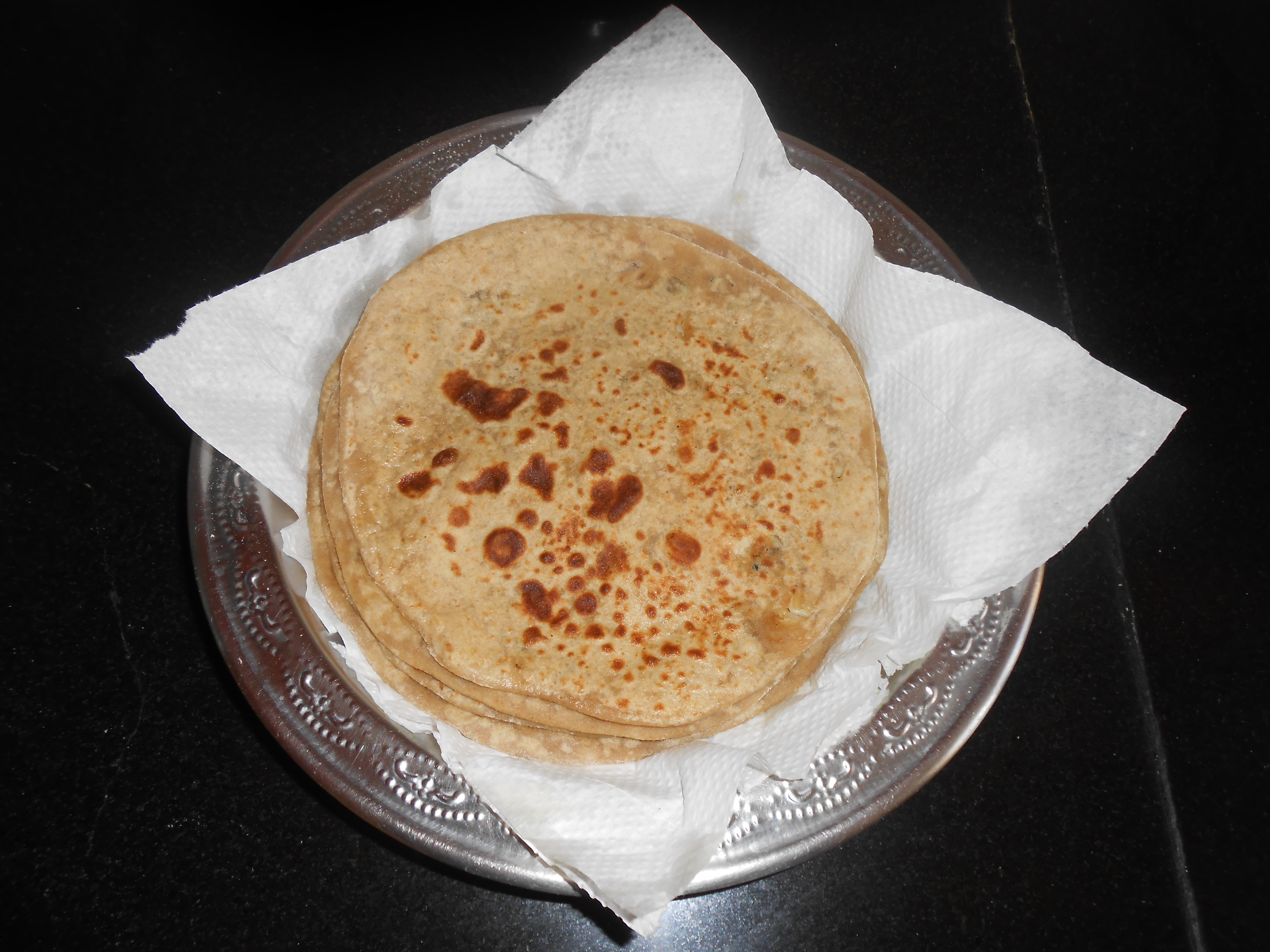
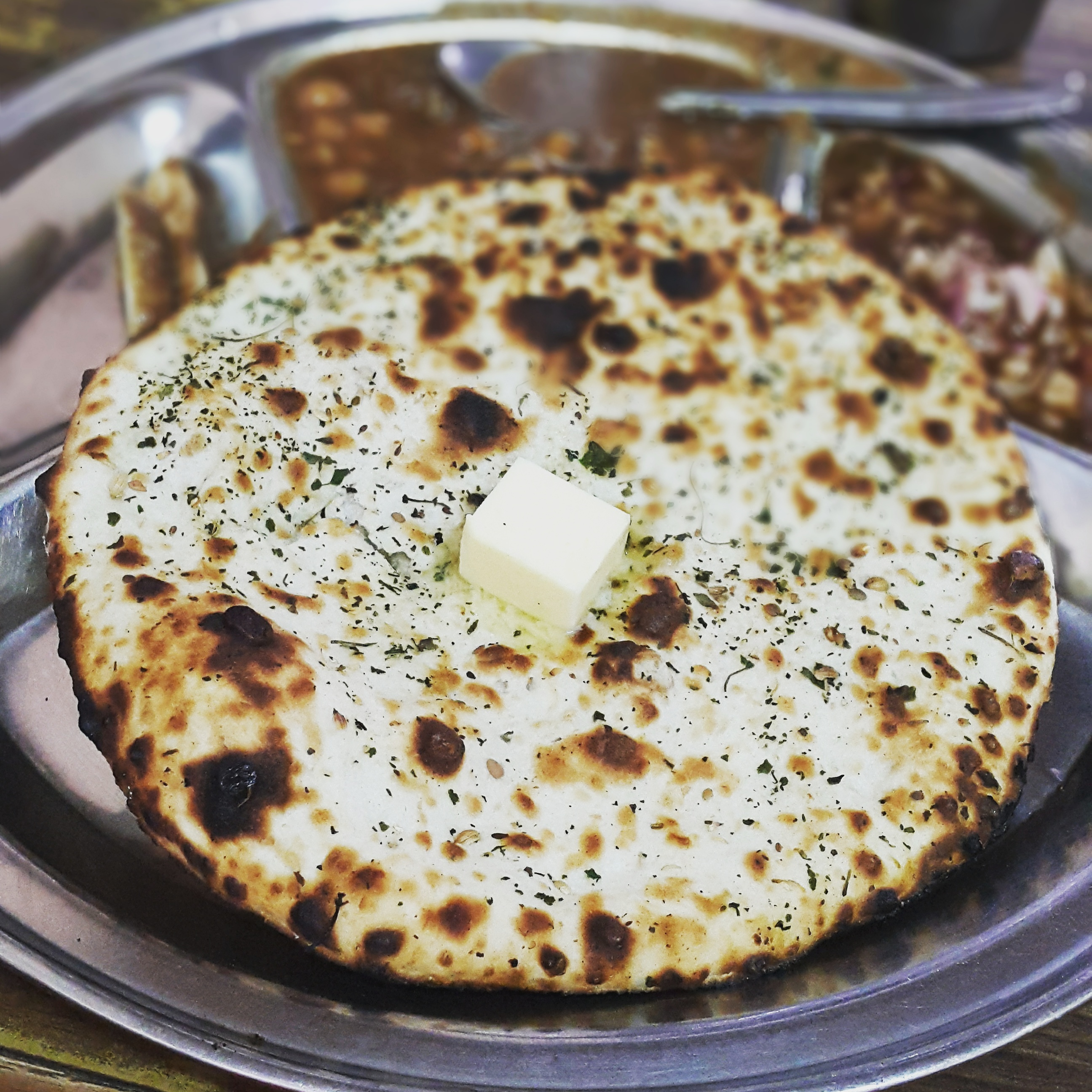
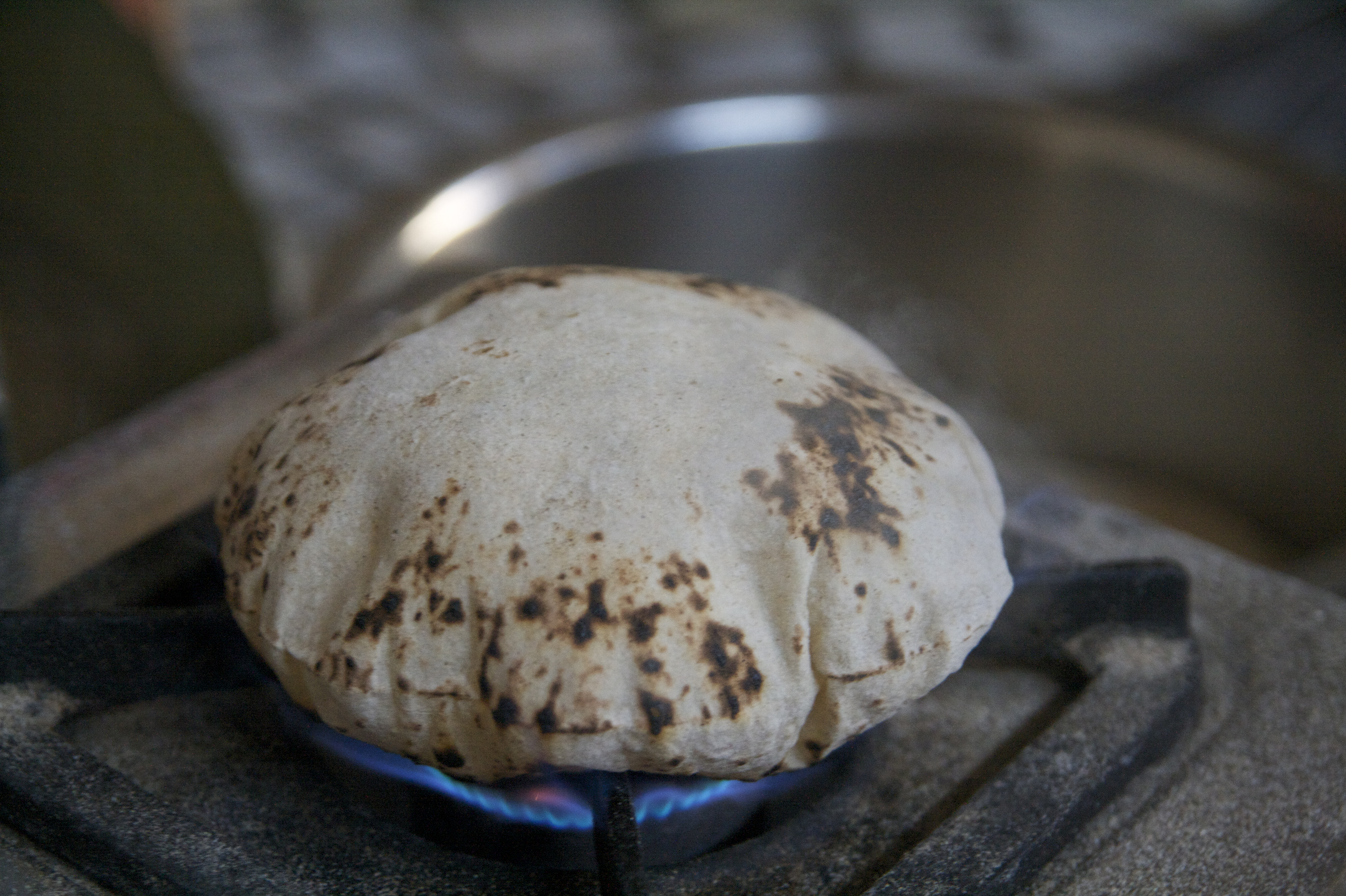
Aloo paratha, Sattu Paratha, Naan, Roti
- Parauntha
  - Aalu parauntha
  - Sattu paratha
  - Piyaz parauntha
  - Posta-dana kaa paratha - filling of a paste made of poppy seeds soaked overnight in water and then ground with spices, particularly red chilli.
- Dal puri
- Makuni
- Makai ke roti
- Naan
- Dosti Poori
- Phuka
- Tandoori Roti

== Vegetarian cuisine ==
Bihari cuisine is closer to Bengali cuisine with lesser Central Asian influence. Most dishes are steamed with a chaunk of spices. Turmeric is usually added to every preparation. Dishes using garam masala are less common.

- Nenua: Sponge gourd steamed with a chaunk of methi (fenugreek seeds) and mirchi (green/red chilli). Chana or chana dal is usually added as well.
- Lauki: Bottle gourd steamed with a chaunk of jeera (cumin seeds) and mirchi (green chili), or panchphoran. Chana dal is usually added as well.
- Aravi in sarson masala
- Alu-Baigan: Potato and brinjal steamed with a chaunk of panchphoran. Other seasonal vegetables like lauki, matar, beans, palak, or tomatoes may also be added.
- Kofta
- Bharwan karela
- Vegetarian korma
- Paal paneer
- Shaahi paneer

=== Saags ===
- Kalmi saag
- Munga saag
- Koira saag
- Gandhari saag
- Koinar saag
- Chakod saag
- Sarla saag
- Chench saag
- Chimti saag
- Katai saag
- Dhhahdhhaa saag
- Golgola saag
- Khesaari saag (Lathyrus sativus)
- Poi saag (Basella alba)
- Palak saag (spinach)
- Bathua saag (Chenopodium album)
- Methi saag (fenugreek)

== Non-vegetarian cuisine ==
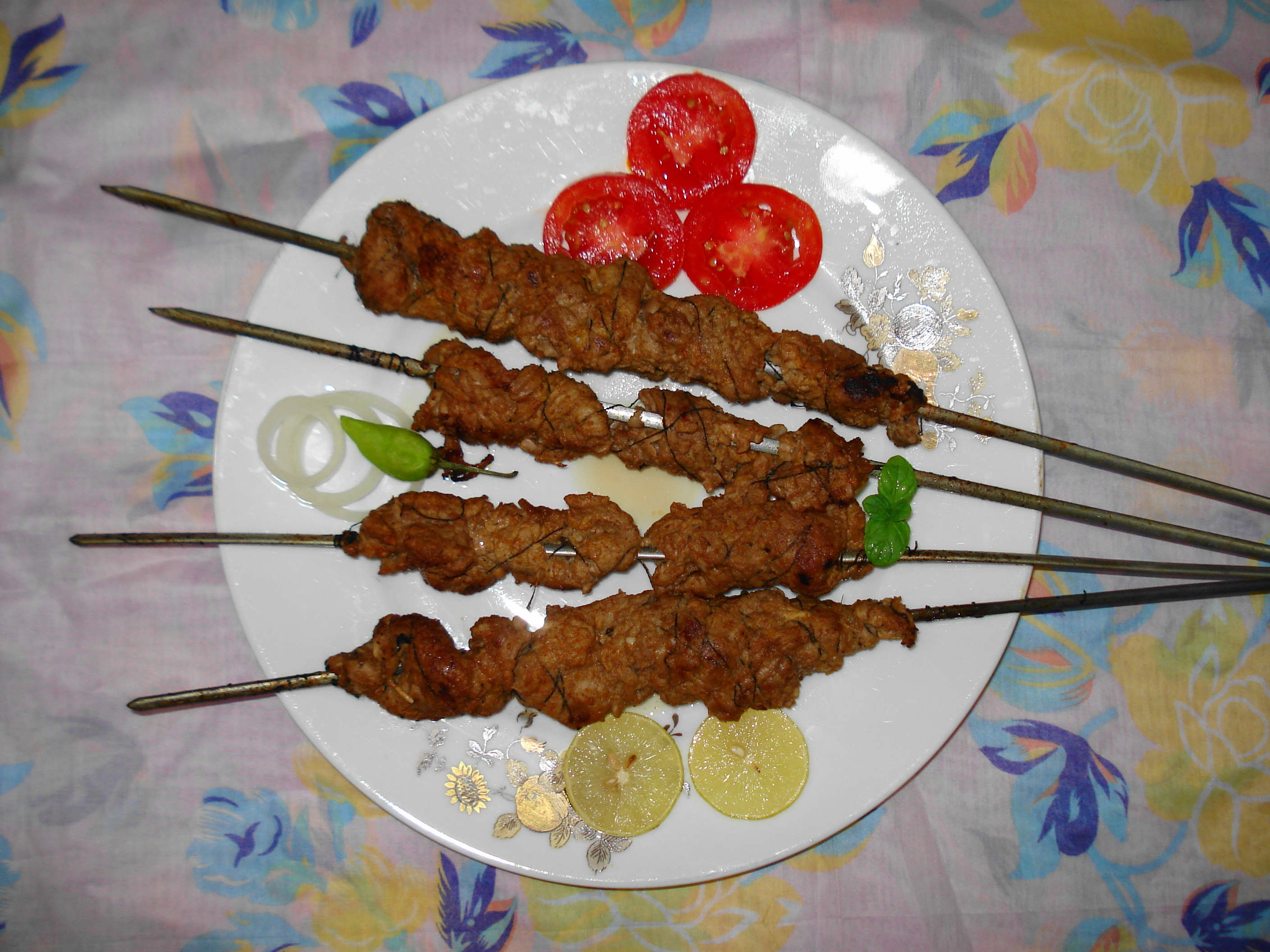
Bihari kebab

The distinctive Bihari flavour of non-vegetarian cooking finds mention in the memoirs of Maulana Abul Kalam Azad, who found it quite tasty. Forms of kebabs, mutton preparations and dishes prepared from various fowl and birds have a distinctive flavor. Biharis are quite famous for their Bihari kebabs, another typical Bihari non-vegetarian dish. This dish was traditionally made from mutton and is eaten with roti, paratha or boiled rice. The region of Champaran is famous for a grilled mutton dish called taash. Recently, in fast food restaurants, Bihari kebabs are also sold as Bihari kebab rolls, which are essentially kebabs wrapped up in a paratha.

- Champaran meat
- Prawns
- Mutton biryani
- Bihari kebab
- Chicken tandoori

== Snacks ==
Snacks
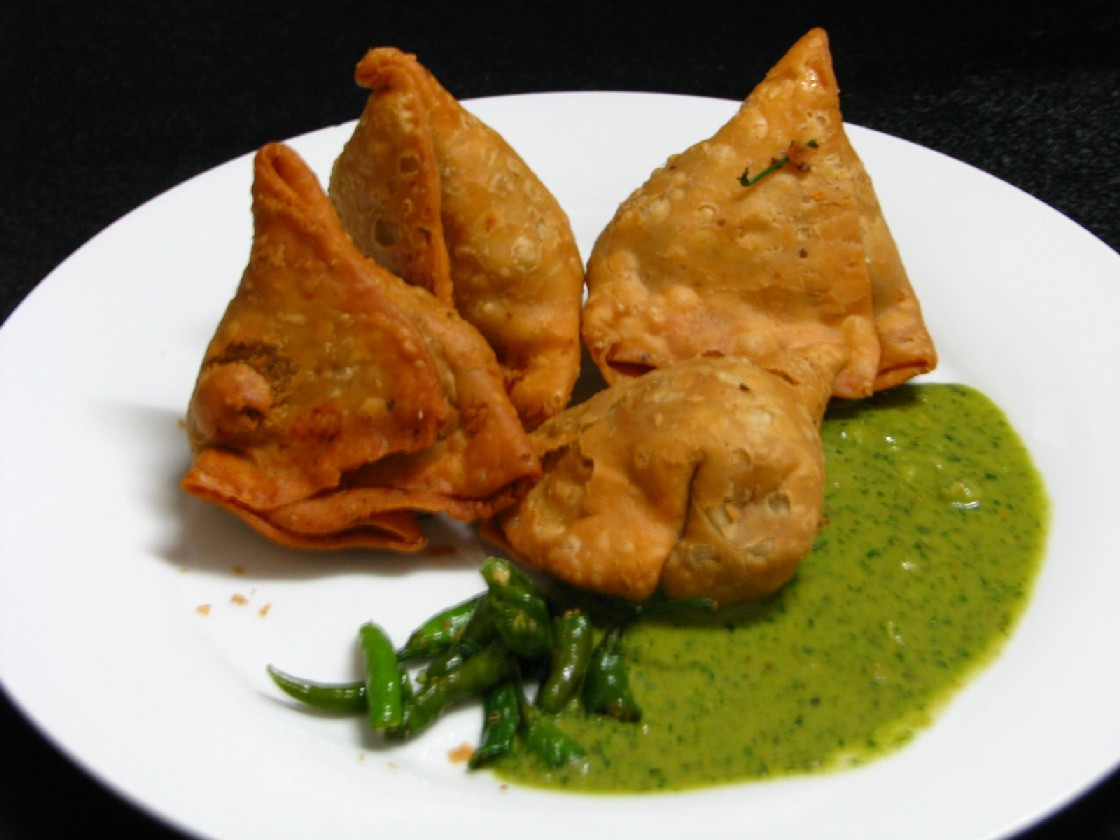
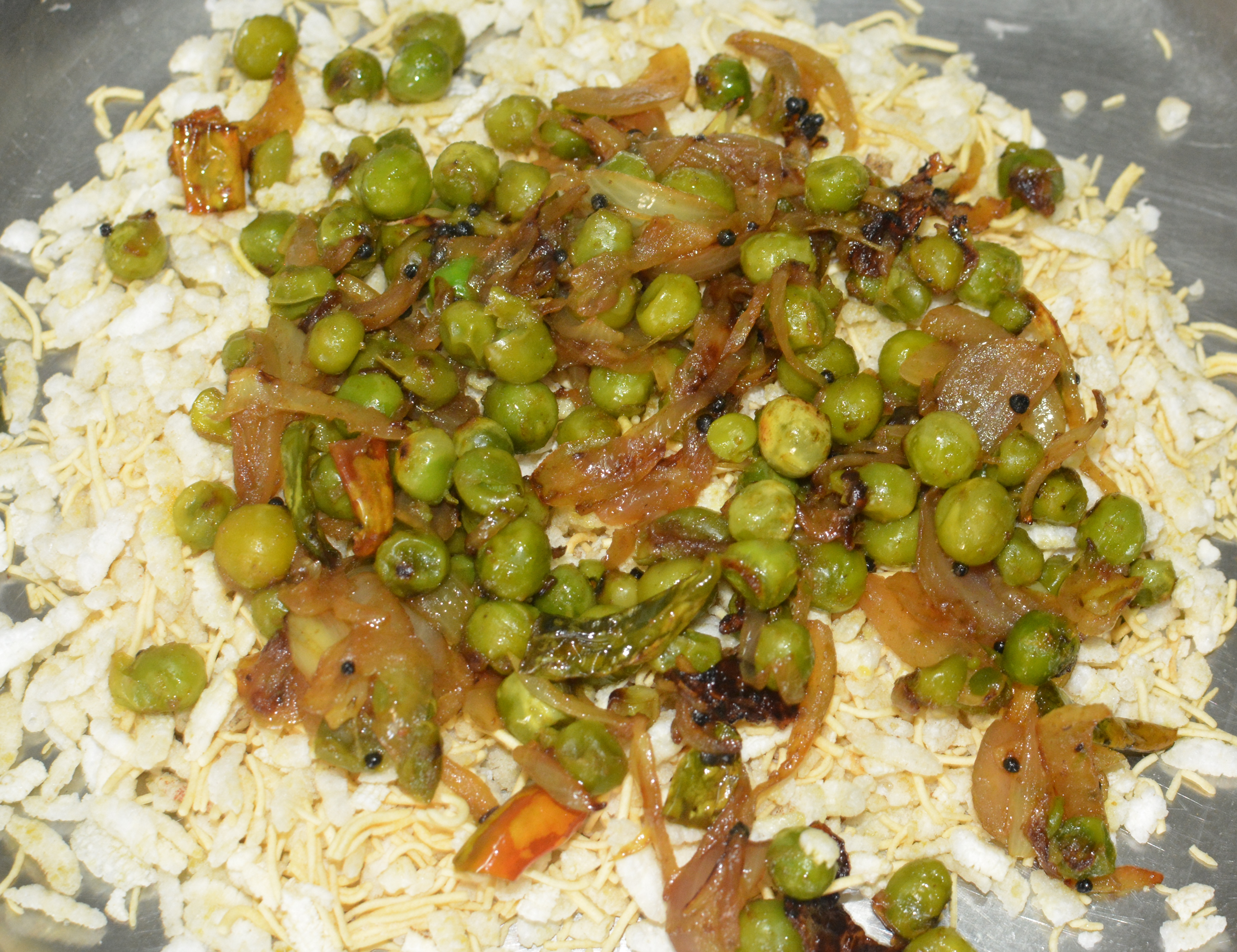
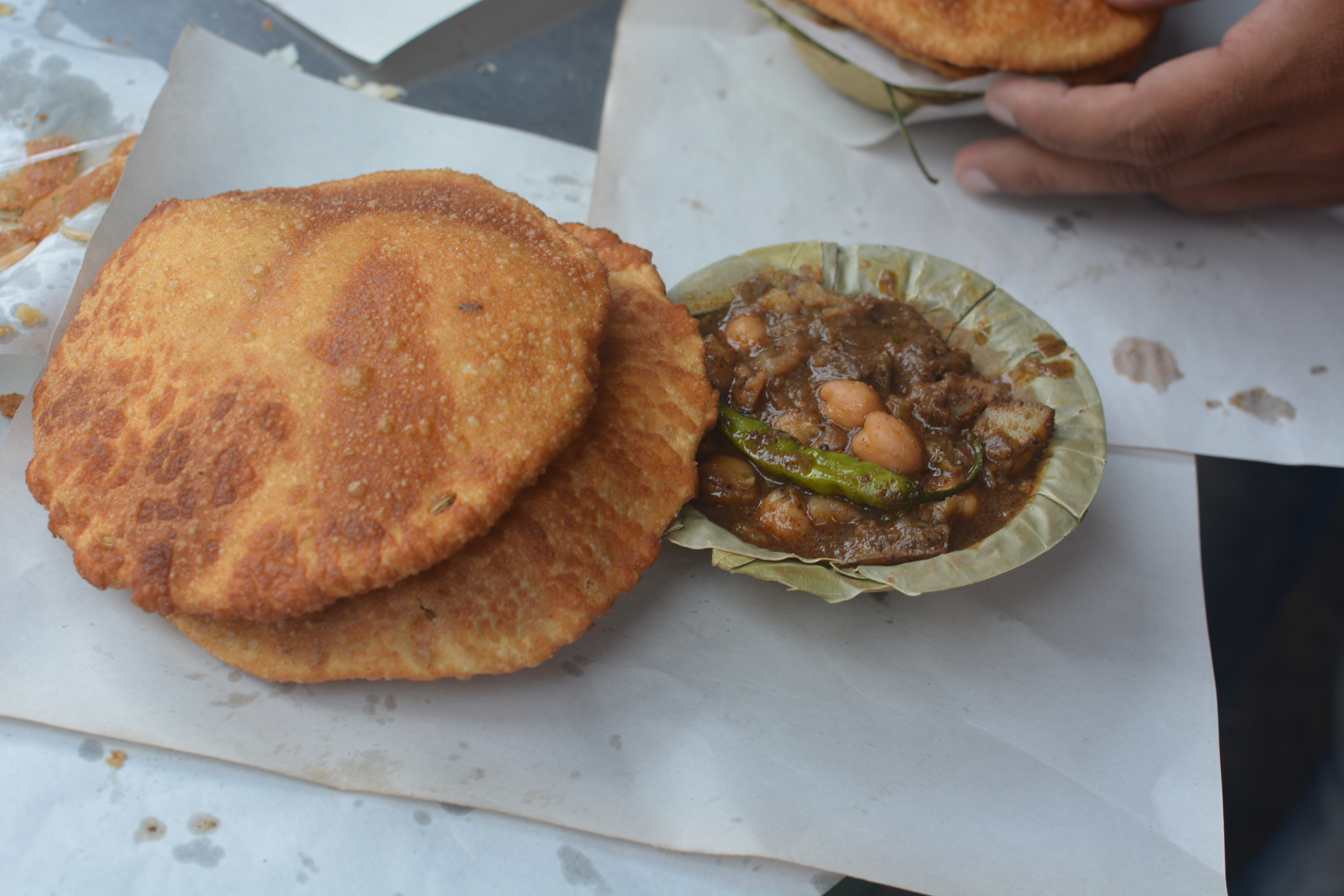
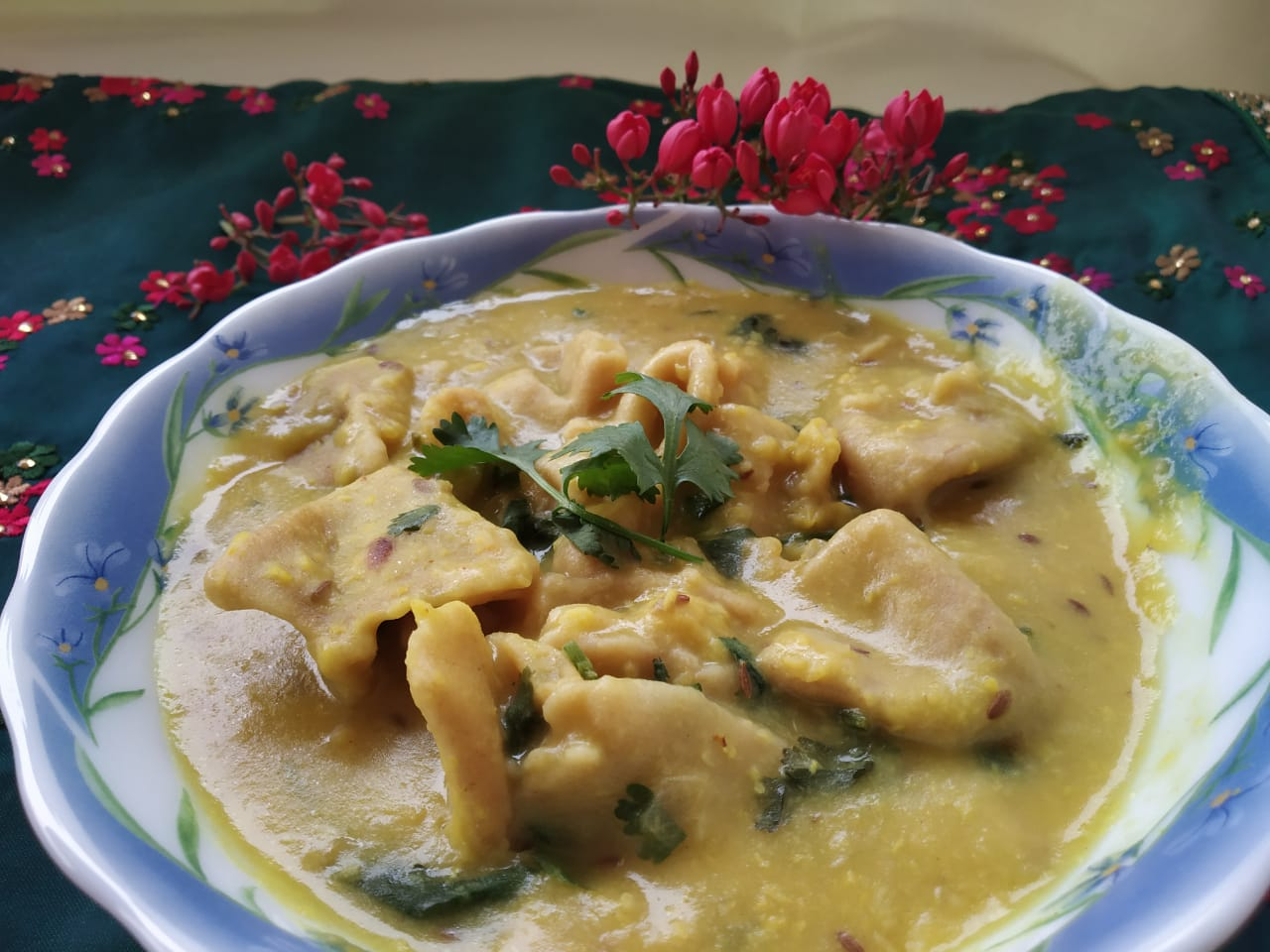
Singhada-Chutney, Churaa-Matar, Kachori-Ghugni, Dal Pithi
- Churra - Beaten rice, served with a coat of creamy curd and sugar or jaggery. In winters, this is mildly baked and accompanied with a thick, spicy preparation made of peas and onions.
- Chokha - Pulsed and mashed vegetables with mustard oil and spices.
- Bajka
- Bhurta
- Bhunjia - Sautéed vegetables cooked in spices, usually containing potatoes. Has no gravy and usually goes well with rice and lentils or chapatti.
- Singhada
- Kachori
- Singhada chaat - Basically singhada, sweet chutney, curd, savoury mixtures with chura, onion and other garnishing ingredients.
- Pappdi Chat- Common in every home
- Bhunja - Commonly eaten in the evening.
- 'Dal Pitthi' is a Bihari dish eaten mostly during breakfast or in the evening with chai. Dal in Hindi means legumes and pitthi means dumplings made of whole wheat

== Sweets ==
Bihari sweets
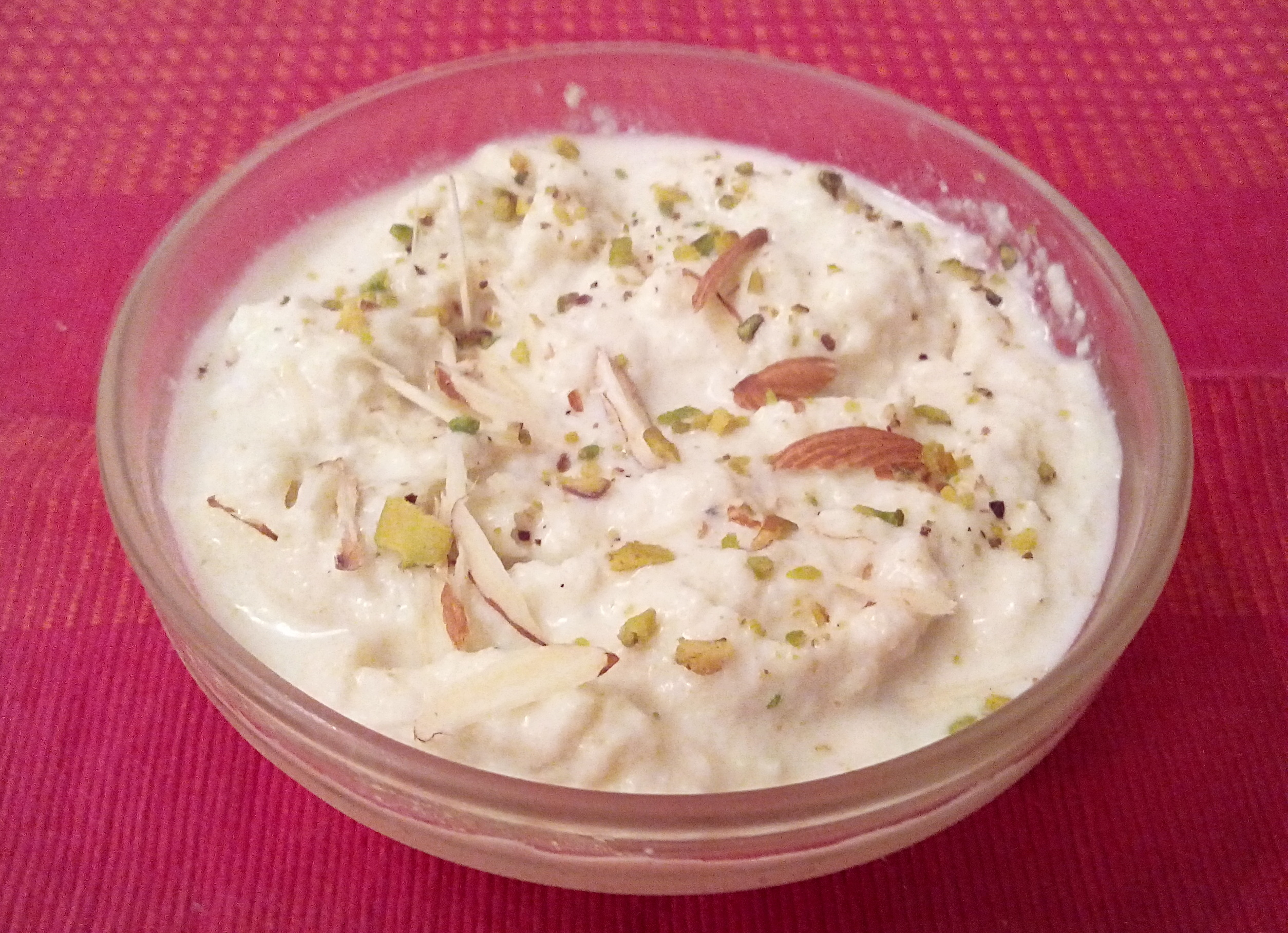
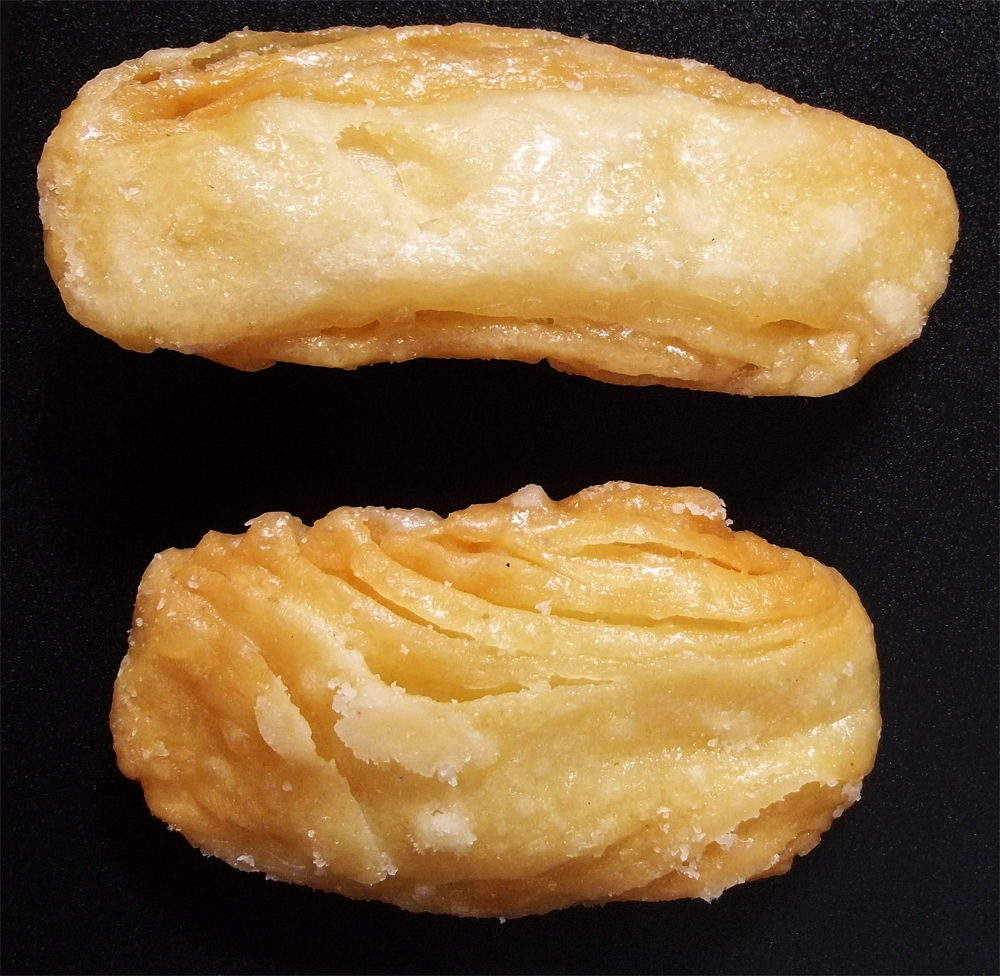
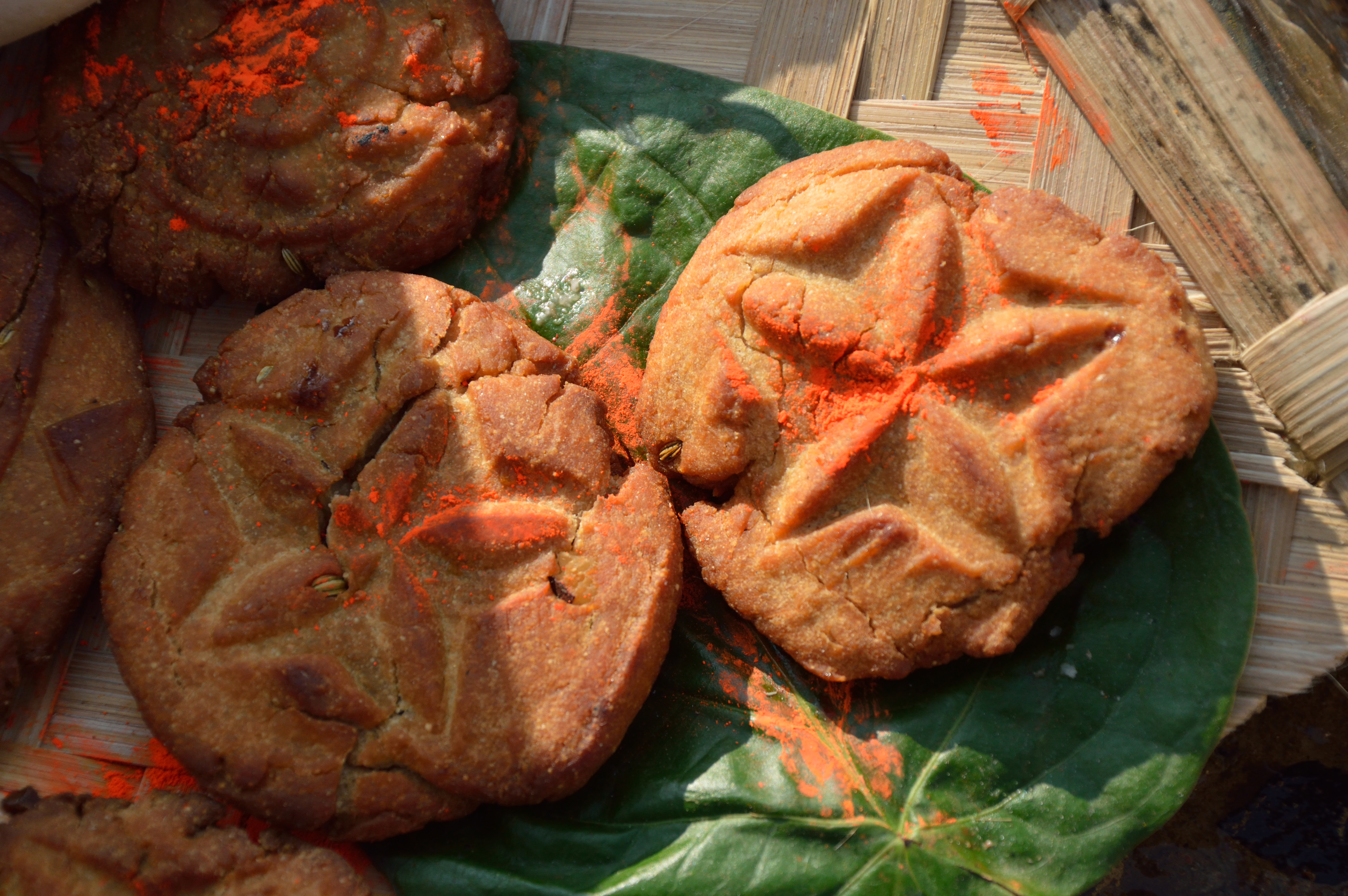
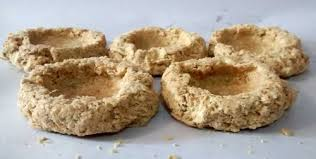
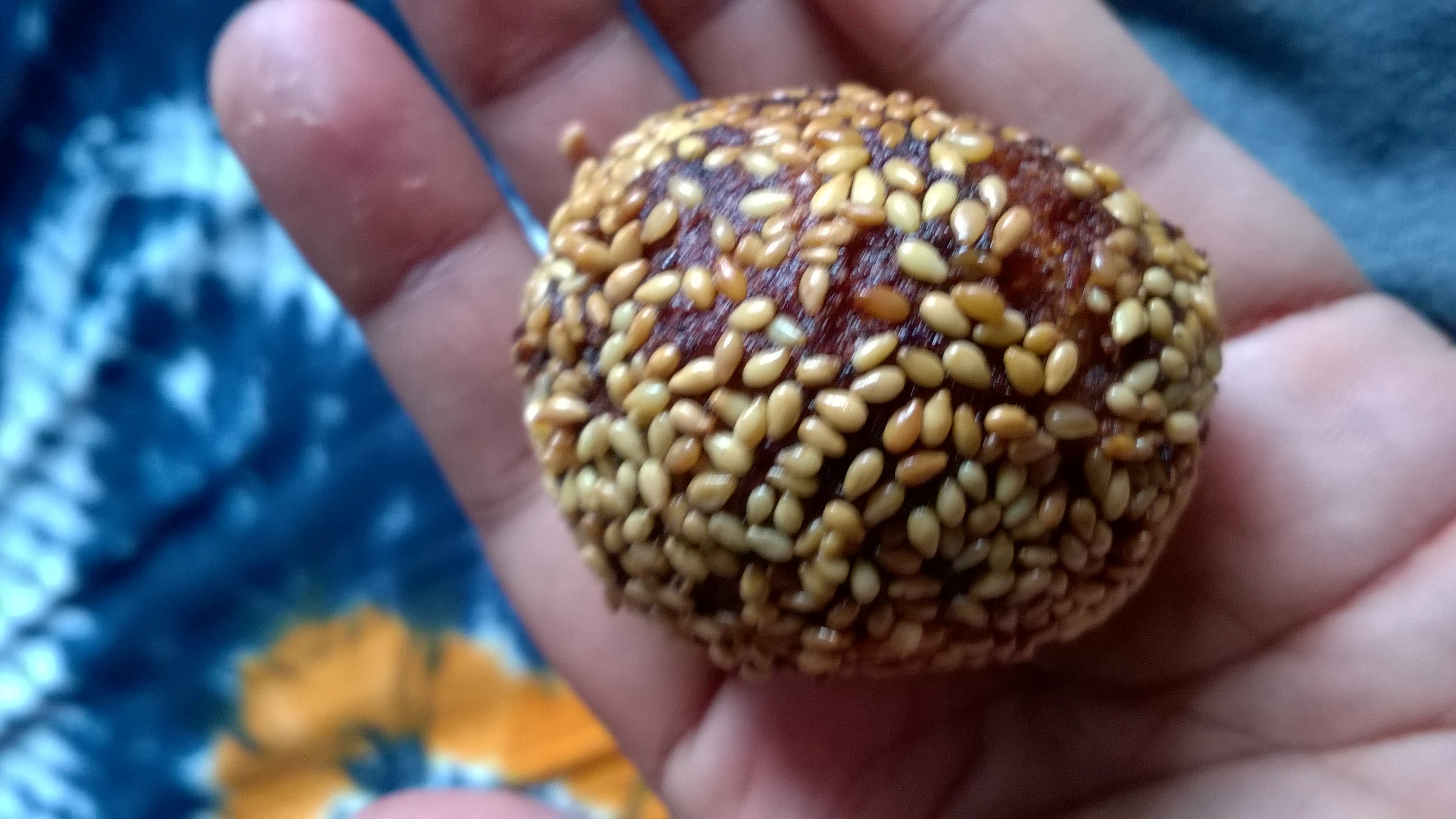
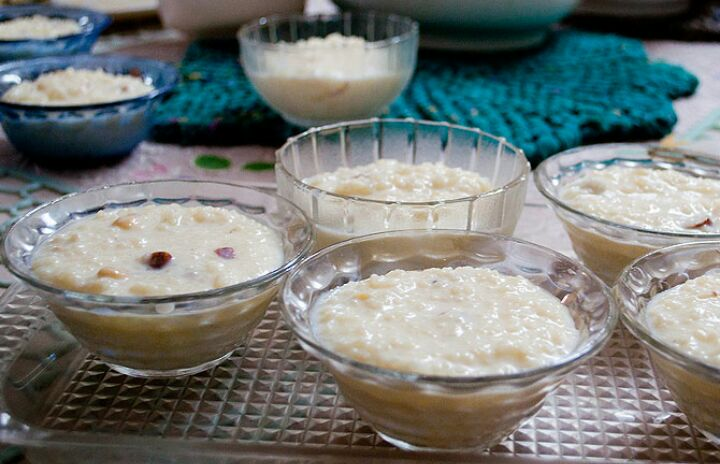
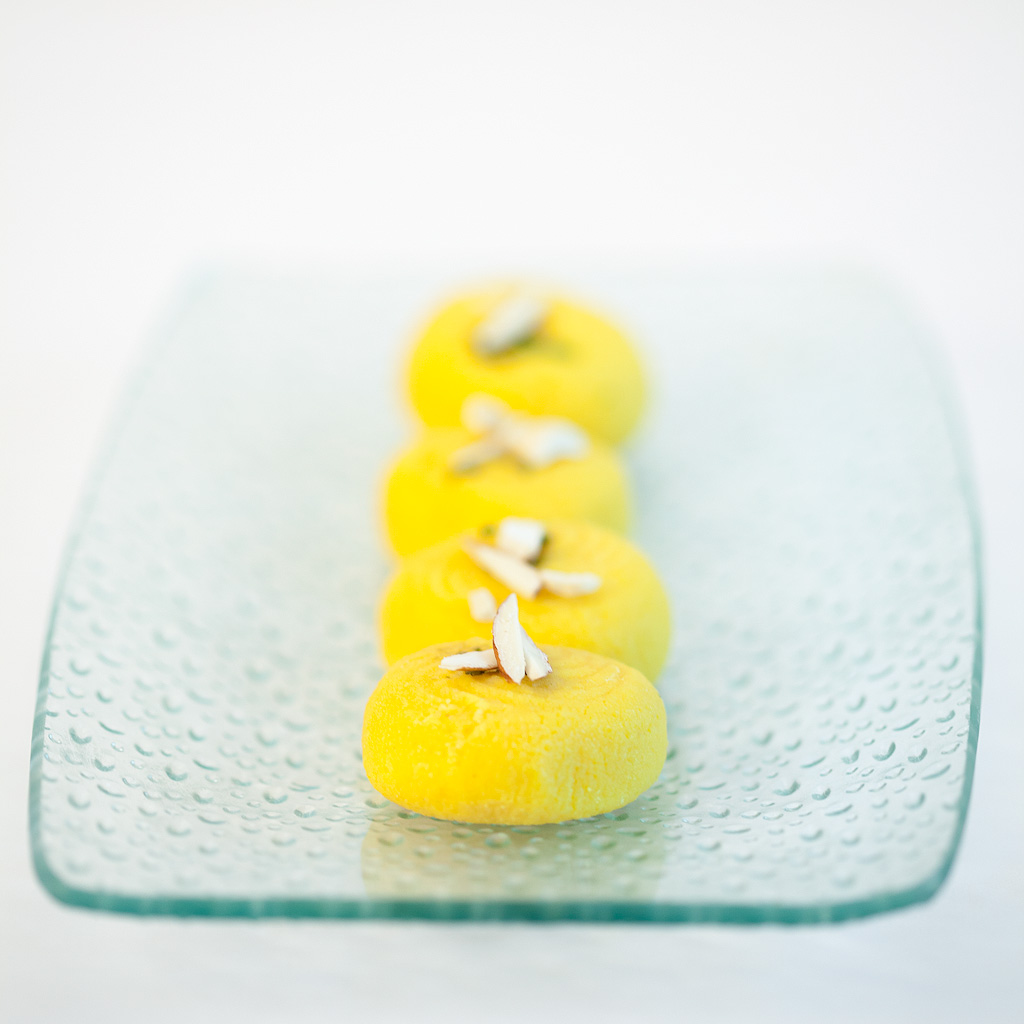
Rabri, Khaja, Thekua, Tilkut, Anarsa, Motichoor ka Ladoo, Makhana kheer, Kesaria'sPeda

There is a large variety of traditional sweet delicacies in Bihar. Unlike Oriya and Bengali sweets, which are soaked in syrups made of sugar and are therefore wet, Bihar's sweets are mostly dry.

- Khaja - This may be compared to the Turkish baklava. Famous ones are from Silao, Nalanda and Pipra, Supaul.
- Chhena - similar to rasgulla
- Tilkut (Til Burfi) - Made of sesame seed and is available only in the winter. A thick hard base of sugar the size of a tennis ball is rolled in copious amounts of sesame seed and then hammered to roll it out in a round shape. Though available all over the state, the one from Gaya is famous.
- Malpua
- Rabri
- Kheer - A special form of kheer called Rasia is prepared during the Chhath festival.
- Thekua
- Khajur
- Laktho
- Churma
- Balushahi - Famous one is from Harnaut, NathNagar (Bhagalpur)
- Anarasa - A traditional cuisine of Mithila
- Motichoor ka Ladoo - Famous one is from Maner
- Khabauni
- Gulab jamun
- Kala jamun - Munger, Bhagalpur and Banka Districts are known for Kala Jamun.
- Pantua - Same as kala jamun but the shape is elongated.
- Peda - Famous one is from Kesaria
- Khurma - Found only in southwest Bihar
- Parwal ki mithai - Made of pointed gourd (botanical name Trichosanthes dioica). The fruit is scrapped to remove the skin, sliced longitudinally, deseeded and boiled to make it tender and then filled with khoyya, a preparation made of condensed milk and dry fruits. It is then imbibed with warm sugar syrup. Silver foil may be added after it cools off.
- Khubi ka lai - Famous one is from Barh
- Belgrami
- Padokkia
- Murki - Famous one is from Koelwar
- Pirikya/gujiya - Made from flour and khoya, etc. It is a flaky pastry filled with sweet khoya and dry fruits stuffing. Khoya or Mawa is evaporated/condensed milk solids. It is famous in Basopatti and villages nearby.
- Khurchan - This is made of layers of scrapped condensed milk. Available in Patna city (old town).
- Postaa-dana kaa Halwa - A sweet pudding made of poppy seeds soaked overnight in water and then ground to a paste and sautéed in ghee (clarified butter) in a wok. This is generally prepared in the winter season.
- Kasar - A dry sweet prepared of coarsely ground rice during the Chhath festival.
- Lai - There are several varieties of lai available in Bihar, including lai from Gaya. The main component of this lai is ram dana seeds. These ram danas are processed and mixed with khoya and sugar to create a disk-shaped sweet.
- Dangra ka Tilkut - Made of sesame seed and available only in the winter. A thick hard base of gur/mittah) the size of a tennis ball is rolled in copious amounts of sesame seed and then hammered to roll it out in a round shape. Though available all over the state, the one from Dangra village in Gaya is famous.
- Paan peda - The famous one is from Mohiuddin Nagar, Madudabad, Kalyanpur Basti area. It is a heart-shaped peda with a completely different taste from the common peda available in the market.
- Gaja - A sweet which is cubical in form and made out of maida.
- Makhana kheer - Kheer made with makhana which is known as fox nut (lotus flower seed); it has medicinal and health benefits and it is not very sweet.

== See also ==
- Bengali cuisine
- Bhojpuri cuisine
- Jharkhandi cuisine
- Maithil cuisine
- North Indian cuisine
- Indian cuisine
- South Indian
