= Malpua =

Type of pancake served as a dessert

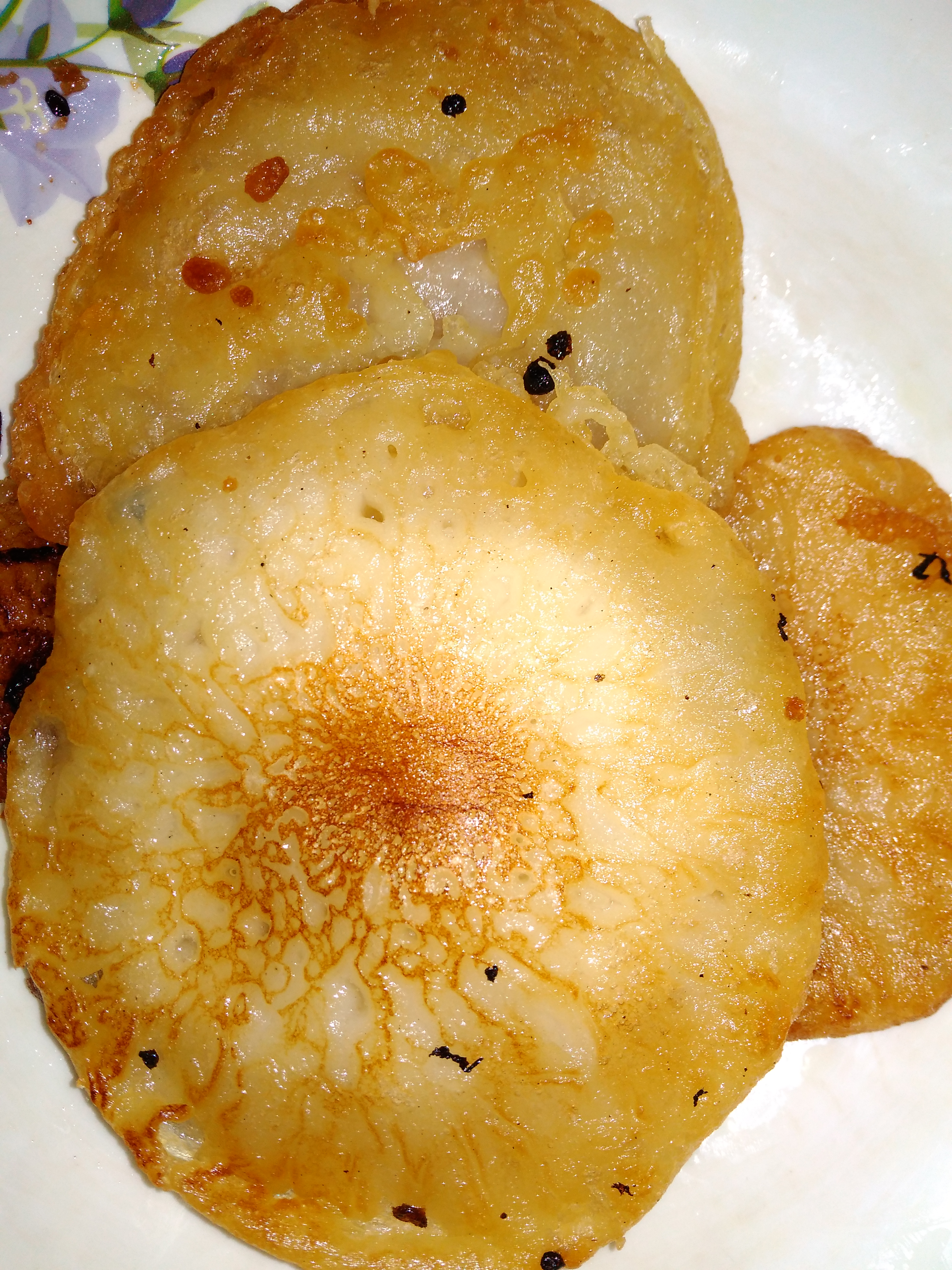
- Course: Breakfast, Snack, Dessert, Sweets
- Place of origin: India, Pakistan, Bangladesh, Nepal
- Region or state: Northern Indian subcontinent
- Associated cuisine: Bangladesh, India, Nepal, Pakistani
- Main ingredients: Plain flour, rice flour, fennel seeds, sugar

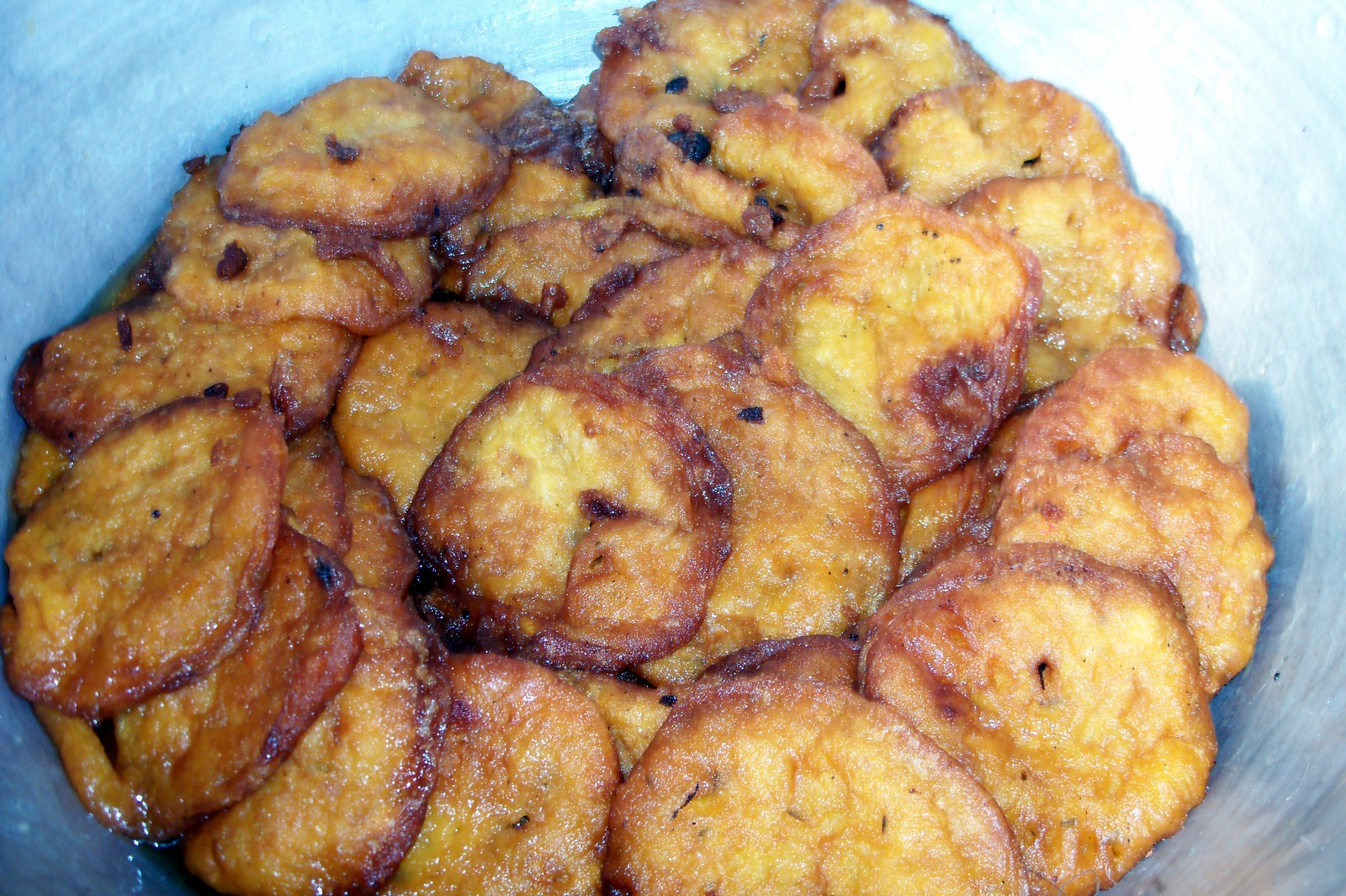
Malapua for Raja festival

Malpua or malpura, (different from pua), is a sweetened breakfast from the Indian subcontinent, served with morning tea, as a snack with afternoon tea, or as a dessert.

== History ==
Barley was the most prolific grain eaten by the Aryans of the Vedic period. One preparation was a sweet cake called Malpua, where barley flour was either fried in ghee or boiled in water, and then dipped in honey. Malpua preserves both the name and the essentials of this preparation.

== Malpua and its varieties ==
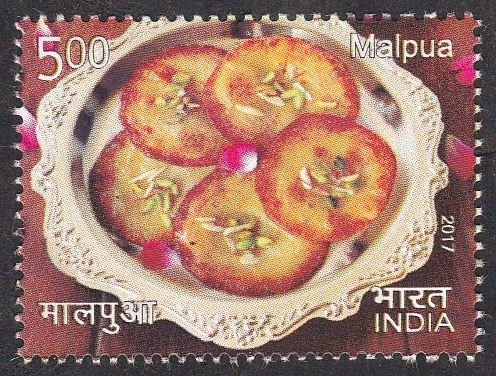
Stamp of India 2017 Festival Malpua

Malpua is popular in Odisha, West Bengal, Bihar, Uttar Pradesh,Maharashtra and Nepal, where it is served during festivals along with other sweets.

In South Indian states such as Tamil Nadu, the same dish is also known as Adhirasam.

The batter for malpua in some areas is prepared by crushing ripe bananas or (in Bangladesh) coconut, adding flour, and water or milk. The mixture is sometimes delicately seasoned with cardamom. It is deep-fried in oil (while in some regions shallow-fried), and served hot. In Odisha the Malpua fritters are dipped in syrup after they are fried. The Bihari version of this dish has sugar added to the batter prior to frying.

Amalu (Malpua) is one of the Chapana Bhoga of Lord Jagannath and is included in the Sanja Dhupa (evening prayer). Other variations of Malpua use pineapples or mangoes instead of bananas. Bengali, Bhojpuri, Maithili and Odia malpua is traditionally made only with thickened milk and a little flour (sometimes rice flour instead of wheat flour).

Malpua in northern India, particularly in Uttar Pradesh, Bihar and Rajasthan, does not contain fruit. There are several variations, using some or all of the following ingredients: maida (refined flour), semolina, milk, and yogurt. The batter is left to stand for a few hours before being spooned into a kadhai of hot oil to form a bubbling pancake which should be crisp around the edges. The pancakes are then immersed in a thick sugar syrup. Malpua is a popular sweet to make on the Hindu religious occasion of Holi. Malpua is also served along with Mutton curry during Holi in the non-vegetarian houses of the Bhojpuri region.

Malpua is a famous dish special among Madheshi people of and Newar people of Nepal. Madheshi people prepare this dish during Holi festival. It is also known as Marpa in the Kathmandu valley where a batter made of Maida, mashed up ripe bananas, fennel seeds, pepper corns, milk and sugar into a batter and prepared in a similar way as in India.

Malpua is a famous dish during the Muslim holy month of Ramadan. Muslim families across India, as well as Pakistan prepare malpuas for iftar (meal to break the fast). This malpua includes maida, rawa, and khoya/ mawa (milk solids), and is deep fried to take the shape of a pancake. In some recipes, malpuas are dipped in sugar syrup called sira before serving. They are famous in Odia cuisine.

== See also ==
- Gulgula – a related sweet that is often round
