= Anarsa =

Sweet food from India

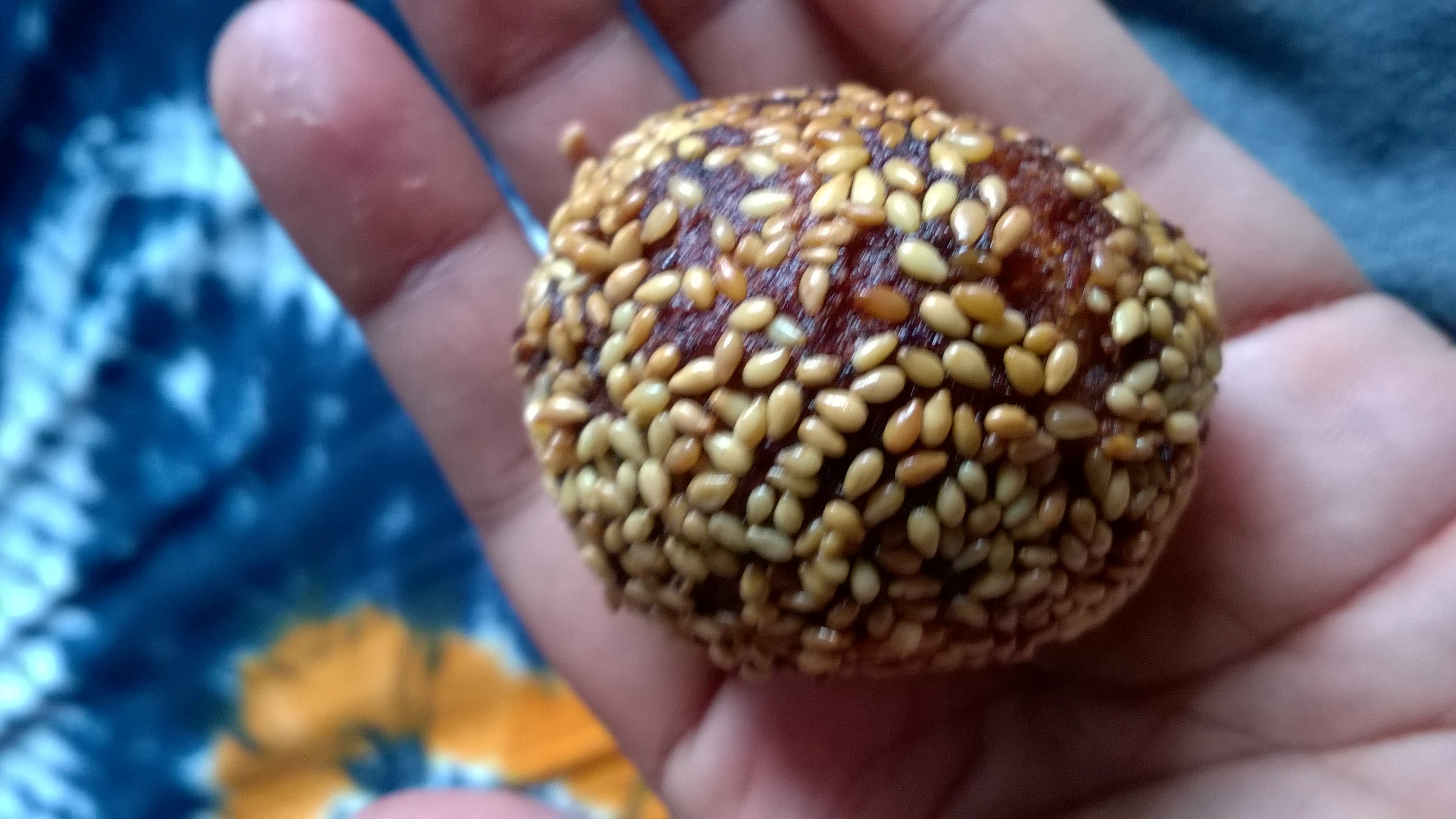
- Course: Dessert
- Place of origin: India and Nepal
- Region or state: Madhesh Province; Bihar; Uttarakhand; Maharashtra; Karnataka
- Main ingredients: Jaggery, rice, poppy seed, ghee

Anarsa or hilsa is a rice-based biscuit in Nepal and the Indian states of Bihar and Maharastra, especially in Gaya located in Bihar. It is commonly associated with the Hindu festival of Diwali (Tihar) in Nepal, Karnataka, Maharashtra and Bihar, along with other special occasions. Its ingredients include jaggery (unrefined cane sugar), rice, poppy seed and ghee (clarified butter).

Anarasha, which means "without corruption" or "eternal" in Sanskrit, is the root of the name "Anarsa". The word Anarasha also denotes cleanness, timelessness, and absence of decay.

== Cultural significance ==
In Indian traditions, particularly in the country's north and west, it has a profound and significant cultural significance. This classic treat has a symbolic connection to cultural heritage, festival celebrations, and prosperity.

== Preparation ==
Main steps in preparing Anarsas include soaking rice in water for a few days with frequent changes of water, then drying it and grinding it into a fine powder. The rice powder / flour is then mixed with jaggery to create a dough. The dough is then rolled in white poppy seeds, pressed into 550–75 cm round disks or balls, and then fried in ghee. The disks are fried poppy-coated side first.

In a variation from the standard recipe, a banana is added to the rice flour base. The Bihari variation of anarsa tends to be rounder and ball-shaped as opposed to the flatter one in Karnataka, Maharashtra.

== See also ==
- Indian sweet
- Khaja
- Tilkut
- Thekua
- Anarasa
- Khajaya
