= Makhan Bada =

Type of doughnuts

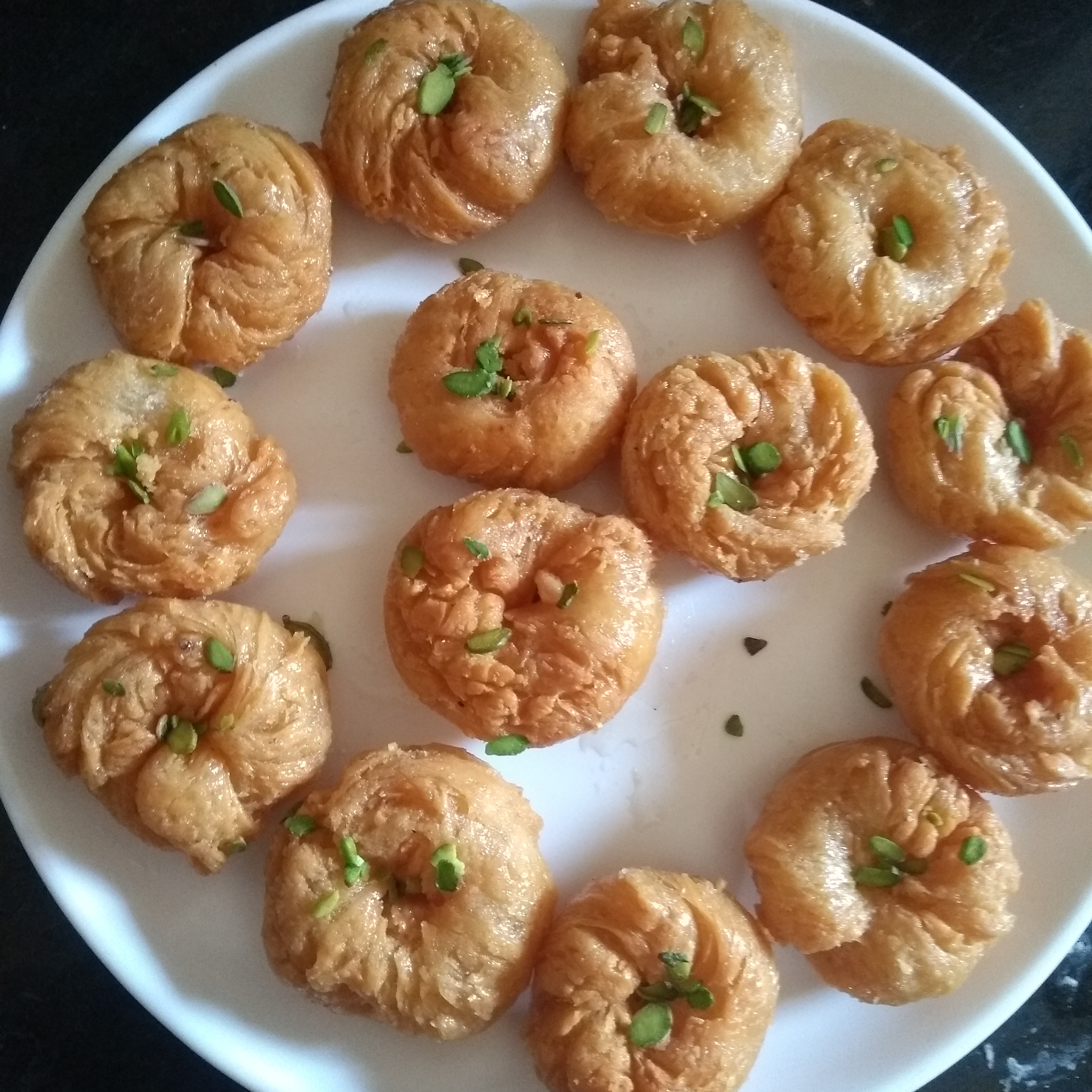
- Alternative names: Makhan Vada, balushahi, balusaahi, badusha
- Course: Dessert
- Place of origin: Indian subcontinent
- Associated cuisine: India, Bangladesh, and Pakistan
- Serving temperature: Hot
- Main ingredients: Maida flour, sugar, ghee, makhan

Makhan Bada, also known as Makhan Vada, balusaahi, balushahi or badusha is a traditional dessert originating from the Indian subcontinent. It is also known as Balushahi or Balusaahi and is similar to a glazed doughnut in terms of ingredients, but differs in texture and taste. Makhan Bada also resembles Rajasthani Baati in terms of size and preparation but its shape is more similar to Medu Vada. In South India, a similar pastry is known as Badusha.

== Preparation ==
Makhan Badas are made of maida flour and are deep-fried in ghee and then dipped in sugar syrup.

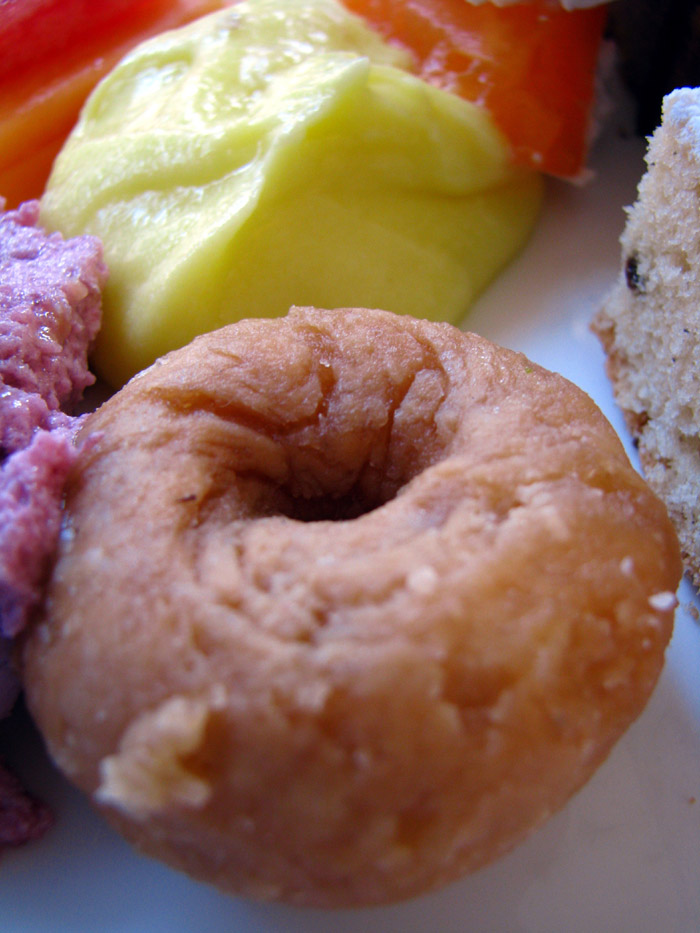
Makhan Bada (also known as Balushahi)
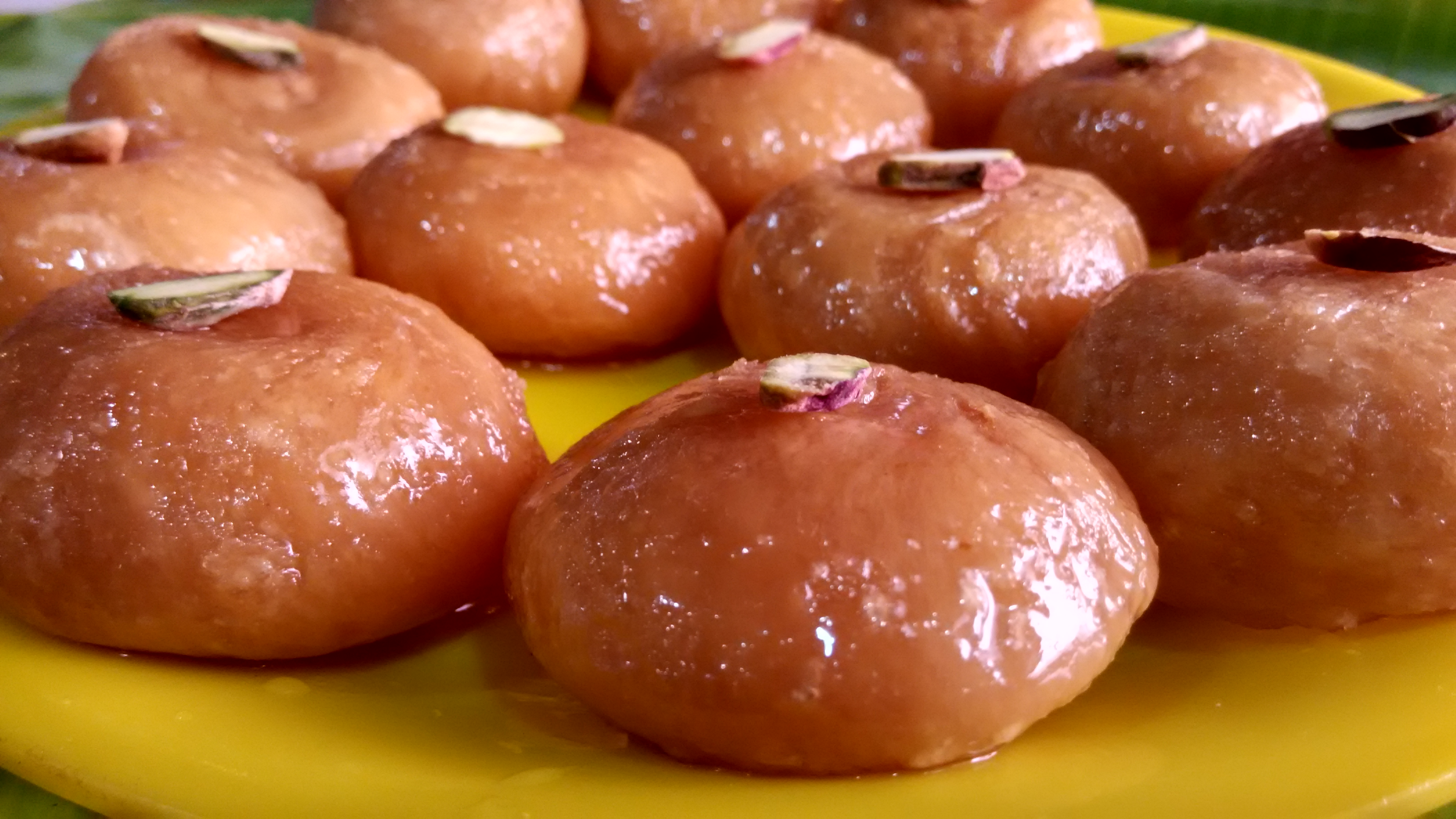
Badusha from South India

== See also ==
- List of fried dough foods
- List of doughnut varieties
- Rajasthani cuisine
- Bihari Cuisine
- Pakistani cuisine
- Indian cuisine
- Indian sweets
