= Dal Pitha =

Bihari dish

- Alternative names: दलपीठा
- Course: Main Course
- Region or state: Bhojpuri region
- Associated cuisine: Bhojpuri cuisine

Dal Pitha (दल पिठा) also known as Pithi, is a Bhojpuri dish, mixture of spicy lentils stuffed into rice flour doughs and then boiled or steamed in a saucepan. Indian language defines "dal" as lentils and "pitha" or "pithi" as whole wheat or freshly prepared rice flour dumplings. The steamed dumplings have a shape similar to that of Gujiyas in the past.

== Region ==
Dal Pitha is a traditional Eastern Indian dish that is consumed in the states of Chhattisgarh, Jharkhand, and Bihar. It is also a famous cuisine in the region of eastern Uttar Pradesh, especially in the Bhojpuri region.

== History and culture ==
The history of this dish is deeply rooted in the sociocultural dynamics of this agrarian region. People in the rural villages, particularly those in the Bhojpur and Mithilanchal regions, were required to work long hours away from home on the farms. They needed a light lunch that would give them instant energy and keep them feeling full for a long period.

== Variety ==
Dal Pitha, a snack, comes in both sweet and savoury varieties. The lentil stuffing is the key to this recipe. People typically love the Bihari snack for the morning, which consists of rice flour dumplings filled with a hot, masala lentil filling. The sweeter variety, where the dal filling adds an extra mixture of coconut and jaggery to give the dumpling a sweet taste, is particularly popular in some areas of Jharkhand and Northern Bengal.

== Nutrition ==
The main component of Dal Pitha is lentils, which are a great source of plant-based protein. They contain essential amino acids that aid muscle development. Additionally, high in dietary fiber, lentils facilitate digestion and prevent constipation. The rice flour used in Dal Pitha provides complex carbohydrates. It is also rich in essential vitamins and minerals such as iron, potassium, magnesium, and vitamin B.

== See also ==
- Bihari cuisine
- Pitha
