= Adhirasam =

Dessert made of rice, coconut, and spices

Khajaya/Adhirasam
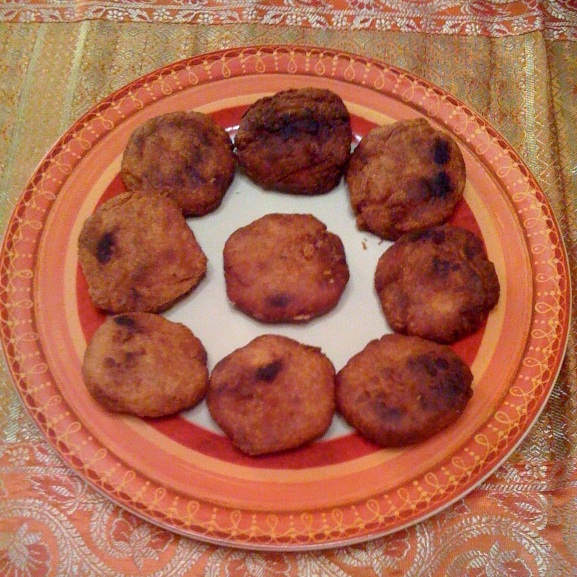
- Homemade adhirasam
- Type: Fried dough
- Course: Sweet
- Region or state: Tamil Nadu, Andhra Pradesh, Karnataka, Telangana, Maharashtra, Odisha, Bihar, Uttarakhand, Jharkhand, Chhattisgarh
- Main ingredients: Rice flour, jaggery
- Variations: Anarsa

Adhirasam, attarasalu, (Tamil: அதிரசம்), kajjaya or athrasa in Kannada (Kannada: ಅತ್ರಾಸ), ariselu in Telugu (Telugu: అరిసెలు), anarasa in Marathi, Airsa in Chhattisgarhi or Arisa pitha in Odia is a type of Indian sweet made out of rice, jaggery, ghee and sometimes coconut and with spices like cardamom, sesame, pepper and ginger powder from Tamil cuisine, Karnataka cuisine, Telugu cuisine, Marathi cuisine and Odia cuisine. The doughnut-like fried dough has a long history of popularity in Kannada, Telugu, Maharashtra, Chhattisgarh, Odisha, and Tamil civilization. They are similar in shape to vada, but are not savoury and are eaten as a sweet.

Khajaya or Adhirasam is a popular as an offering to the relatives during Deepavali and Ganesha Chaturthi festivals, both at home and in temples in Tamil Nadu and Karnataka.

== Historical and cultural significance ==
The earliest documented references to Adhirasam emerge from medieval Tamil kingdoms, particularly the Chola dynasty, where it appeared as a favored item in royal feasts and temple rituals. According to inscriptions from the 16th century, during the reign of Vijayanagara emperor Krishnadevaraya, the sweet was made from rice flour, jaggery, ghee and pepper. At the annual festival at the Panchavarnesvar Temple in Thirunallur (located near Kumbakonam, Tamil Nadu), an offering of 6000 Adhirasams along with 6000 vadas is made to the Gods; the entire lot is cooked in the temple kitchen between sunrise and 11 pm, for the prayers that take place at midnight. It is a popular Deepavali sweet preparation for Tamil people.

== Preparation ==
The authentic preparation takes about a week. First the rice is soaked in water and dried in shade and ground into a fine powder when the rice is 3/4th dried and retains some moisture. For adding sweet "Belaa" (Jaggery in Kannada) "vellam" (jaggery in Tamil) is melted in water by boiling it till it reaches soft-ball consistency (235–240 °F (113–116 °C), if using a candy thermometer) and added to the rice flour along with some powdered cardamom to make a thick dough. It is then transferred to an earthenware pot and the top of the pot is closed with a thin white cloth. It is then allowed to ferment for about 3–5 days by placing it in the sunlight during the day. Finally, when the batter is ready for preparation, small balls of the dough is taken and flattened using fingers in a small piece of oil-brushed banana leaf and deep fried in oil until golden brown. Then it is pressed with a flat bottomed bowl to remove the excess oil.

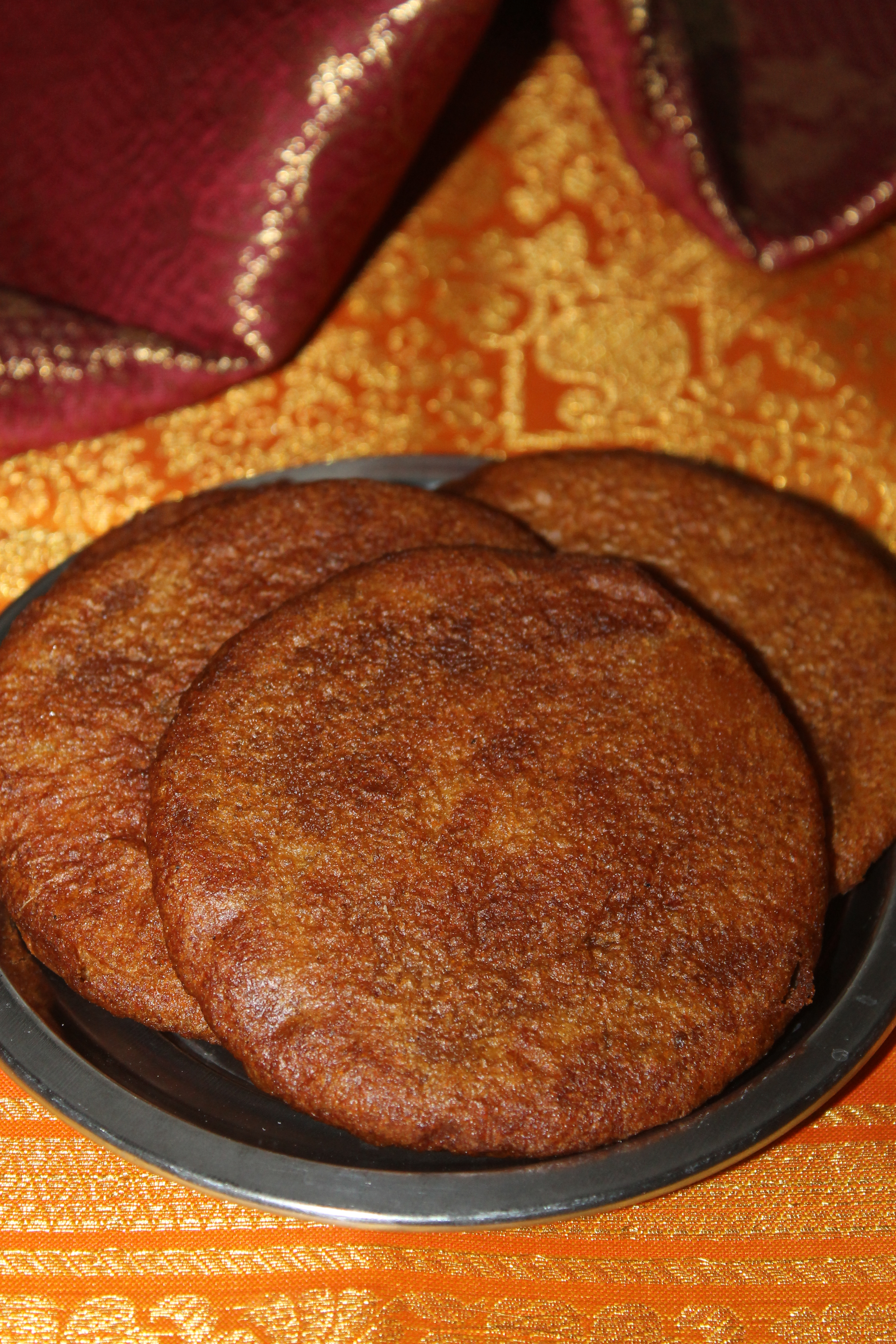
Khajaya/Adhirasam

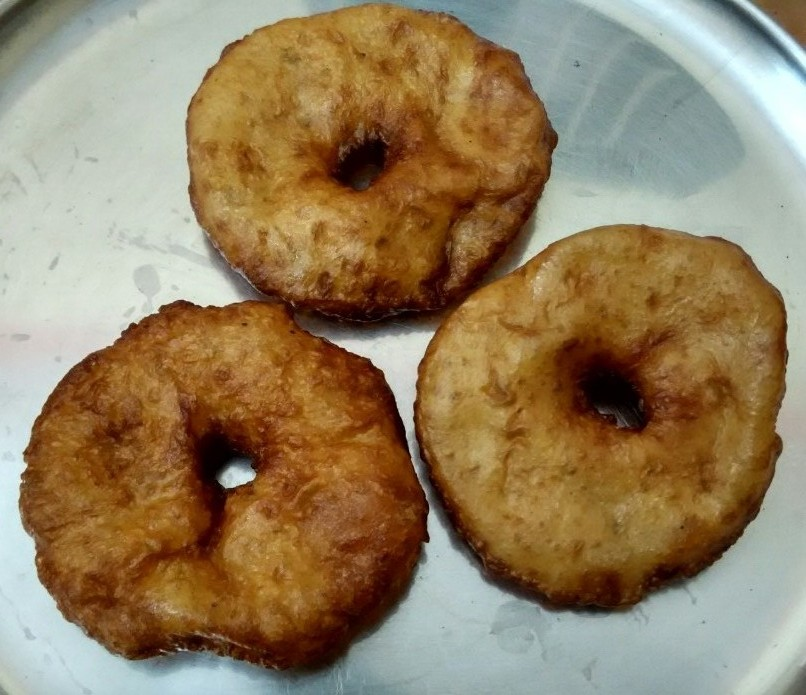
Khajaya/Adhirasam

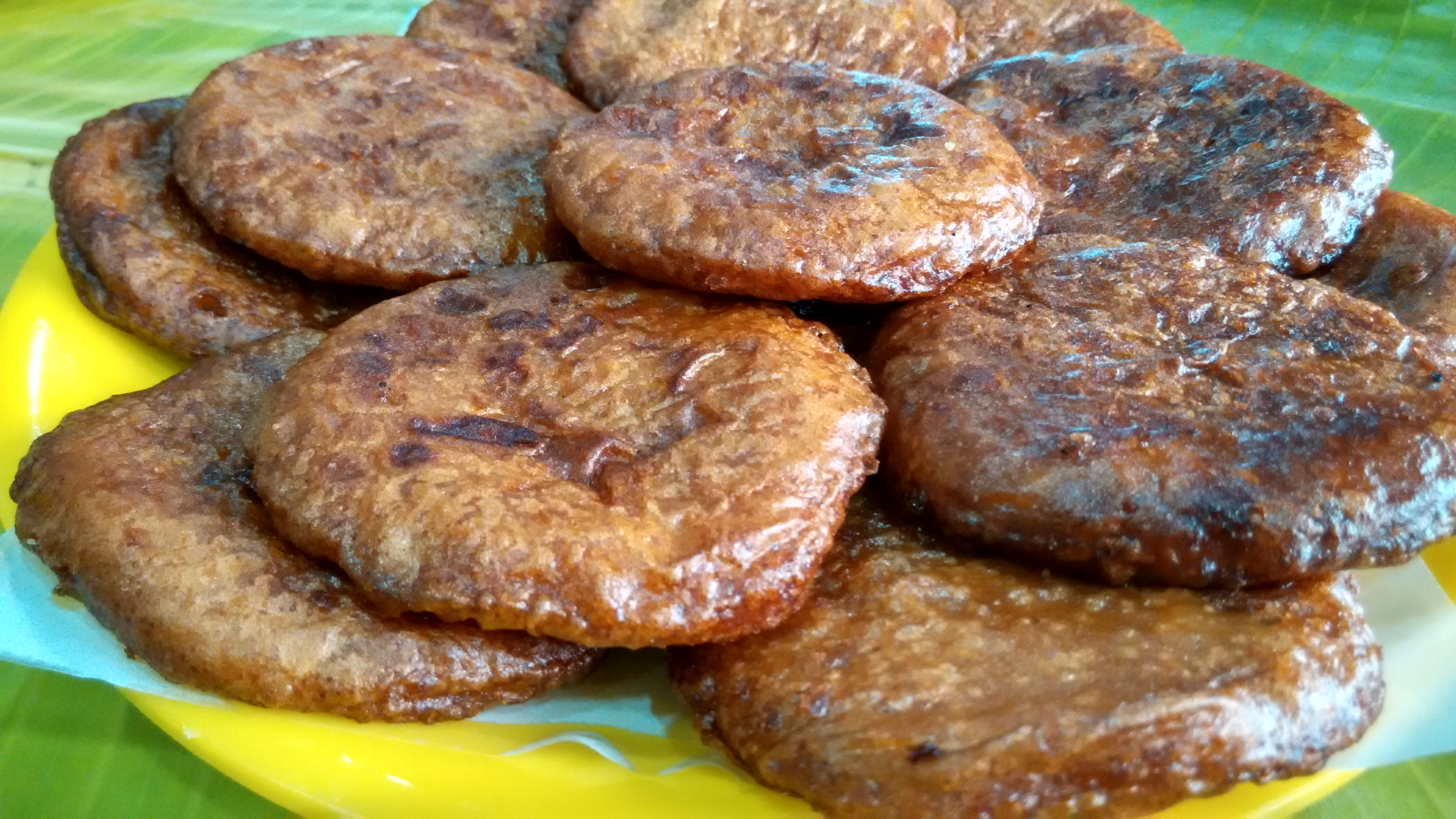
Athirasam of Salem

== See also ==
- Karnataka cuisine
- Tamil cuisine
- List of fried dough foods
- List of doughnut varieties
- Adirasam Recipe
