= Thirunallur, Thanjavur =

Thirunallur
- village
- Country: India
- State: Tamil Nadu
- District: Thanjavur
- Taluk: Kumbakonam

Population (2001)
  - Total: 1,042

Languages
  - Official: Tamil
- Time zone: UTC+5:30 (IST)

Thirunallur is a village in the Kumbakonam taluk of Thanjavur district, Tamil Nadu, India.

== Demographics ==
According to the 2001 census, Thirunallur had a total population of 1042 with 520 males and 522 females. The sex ratio was 1.004. The literacy rate was 65.72

Thirunallur is home to the famous Arulmigu Panchavarneswarar Alayam, a temple of Lord Shiva. A lingam in the temple changes color five times a day, turning copper-coloured, light red (the color of sunrise), the colour of molten gold, emerald green, and an indescribable colour. Researchers have been unable to find the reason for the color changes.
