= Khurchan =

Milk-based sweet dish in India

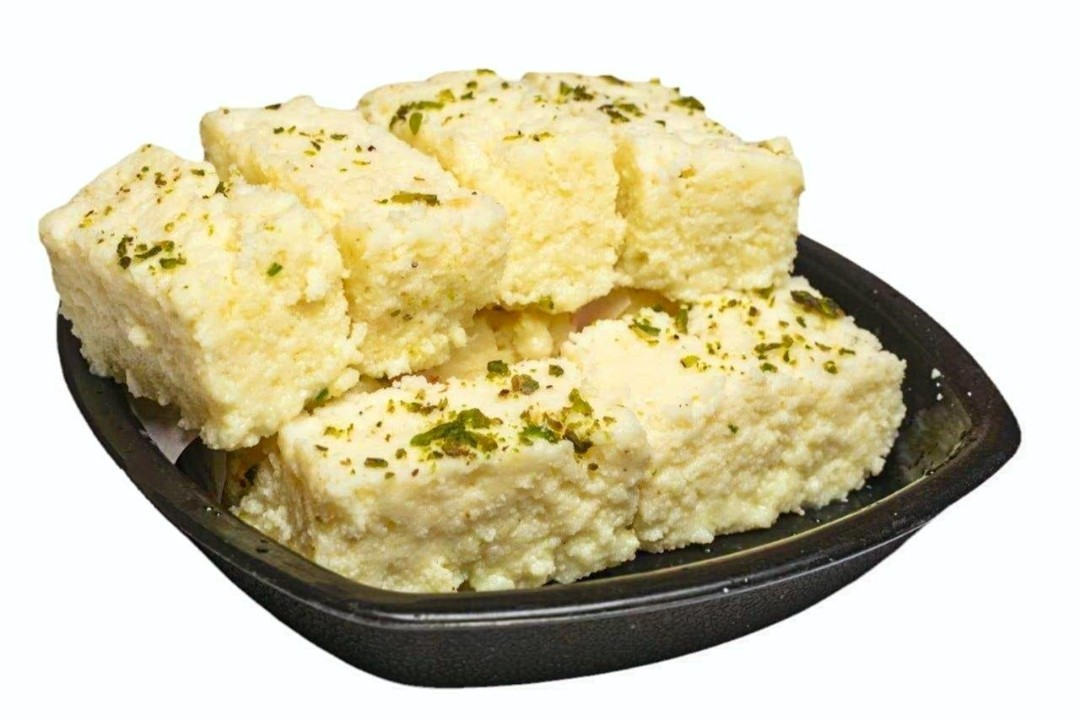
- Alternative names: Malai Khurchan
- Type: Milk-based sweet
- Course: Sweet, Dessert
- Place of origin: North India
- Region or state: Primarily associated with Delhi and Khurja (Uttar Pradesh), also a local specialty in the Bundelkhand region of Madhya Pradesh.
- Associated cuisine: Indian cuisine
- Main ingredients: Full-fat milk (typically buffalo's milk), Sugar
- Ingredients generally used: Cardamom, Pistachios
- Similar dishes: Rabri, Kalakand

Khurchan is a traditional Indian sweet delicacy originating from North India. It is particularly associated with the cities of Delhi and Mathura. Its name 'Khurchan' is derived from the Hindi word khurchana, meaning "to scrape," which refers to the process of scraping off layers of thickened cream during its preparation. It is a seasonal sweet, often enjoyed during the winter months, and is known for its rich, creamy texture and distinct milky flavour.

In 1999, during his Lahore bus ride to Pakistan, Prime Minister of India, Atal Bihari Vajpayee carried khurchan for Pakistani Prime Minister Nawaz Sharif.

== History ==
The sweet is believed to have developed in regions with a strong tradition of dairy production. It has been associated with Old Delhi's Kinari Bazaar, where some vendors are reported to have been preparing and selling it for over a century. The city of Khurja in Uttar Pradesh is also noted for its long-standing connection to the sweet. Khurchan is referenced as a local specialty in parts of the Bundelkhand region, including the Chhatarpur district, Rampur Baghelan, Satna, located in Madhya Pradesh.

Some sources described Khurchan as having originated in the Indian state of Madhya Pradesh.

== Preparation ==
It is made by simmering full-fat milk in a large, shallow iron pan over a low flame. As a thin layer of cream (malai) forms on the surface, it is carefully lifted and pushed to the side of the pan with a spatula. This process is repeated continuously, creating a stack of flaky, yellowish layers of malai. The collected layers are then gently sweetened with sugar.

Khurchan is typically prepared using buffalo milk, which is preferred due to its higher fat content and yield compared to cow's milk.

== See also ==
- Peda
- Rabri
- Kalakand
- Kulfi
