= Khaja =

Indian dessert

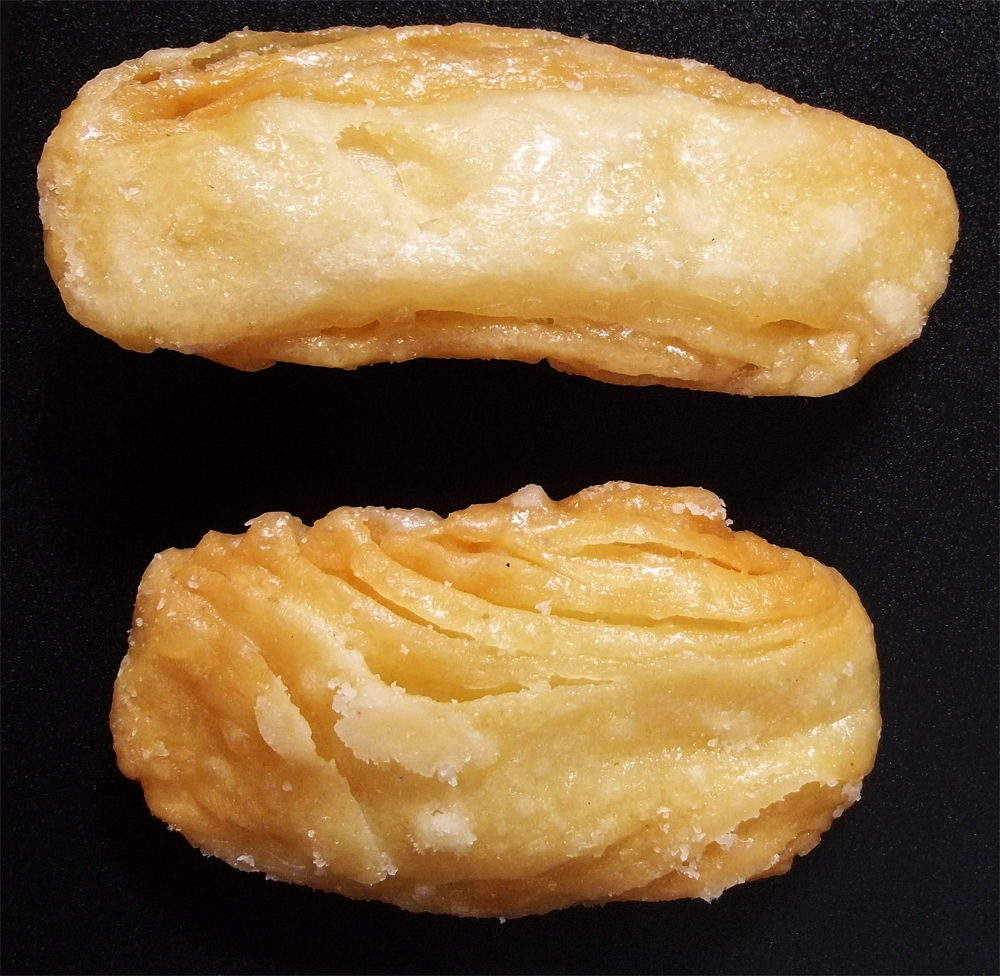
- Course: Dessert
- Place of origin: India and Nepal
- Region or state: Bihar, Jharkhand, Uttar Pradesh, West Bengal, Odisha, Andhra Pradesh, Southern Nepal (Koshi Province and Madhesh Province)
- Main ingredients: Wheat flour, sugar, Cooking oil
- Variations: Kakinada Kaja, Tapeswaram Kaja, Pipra Khaja

Khaja or khajuri (Bhojpuri: 𑂎𑂔𑂳𑂩𑂲, romanized: Khajurē) is an Indo-Nepalese deep fried dessert made with pastry dough, commonly filled with fruit or soaked with sugar syrup.

== History ==
Khaja, plain or sweet mentioned in Silao, was a wheat flour preparation fried in ghee similar to Chandrakala, a flaky dessert from South India. Khaja is believed to have originated from the eastern parts of the former state of Magadh and the former United Provinces and Magadh. Silao, Nalanda districts of Bihar, and is also native to state of Magadh as well as regions like Kutch and Andhra Pradesh and Karnataka. Refined wheat flour with sugar is made into layered pastry dough, with or without dry fruit or other stuffing, and lightly fried in oil to make khaja.

In his 1872–1873 expedition to Silao, renowned British archaeologist Joseph David Beglar, talks about the sweet that dates back to King Vikramaditya and describes the sweetmeat. There is a famous folk tale that the Lord Buddha was offered Silao Khaja as he traveled through Silao on his way from Rajgir to Nalanda. There are Buddhist sites near Silao.

== Region ==
It is one of the famous sweets of Silao and is related to emotions of all Southern Nepalis (Tharus and Madhesis) and Indian Magadh people. It is also offered as an offering sweet in some festivals.

Khajas from Southern Nepal as well as Silao and Rajgir in Bihar are almost entirely similar to baklava, whereas the ones from Odisha and Andhra Pradesh are made with thicker pastry sheets, and are generally hard.

== Preparation ==
The dough is prepared from wheat flour, mawa and oil. It is then deep fried until crisp, before being soaked in a sugar syrup known as Paga, the pastry absorbing the syrup. Kaja served in Kakinada, a coastal town of Andhra Pradesh, are served dry on the outside and soaked with sugar syrup on the inside.

Khaja sweet is popular in Magahia and Bihari in Magadha. This sweet is a part of Chhath Puja, given as a gift at the daughter's wedding in Magadh Bihar.

== Geographical indication (GI) tag ==
In December 2018, the popular delicacy from the Nalanda district of Bihar, known as Silao khaja, has been given a Geographic Indications Registry (GI) tag by the Geographical Indications Registry in Chennai. Tourists who visit the Buddhist sites of Rajgir and Nalanda also enjoy silao khaja.

== See also ==
- Chandrakala, a flaky dessert from South India.
- Kakinada Kaja
- Indian sweets
- Thekua
