= Thekua =

Indo-Nepalese Cookie

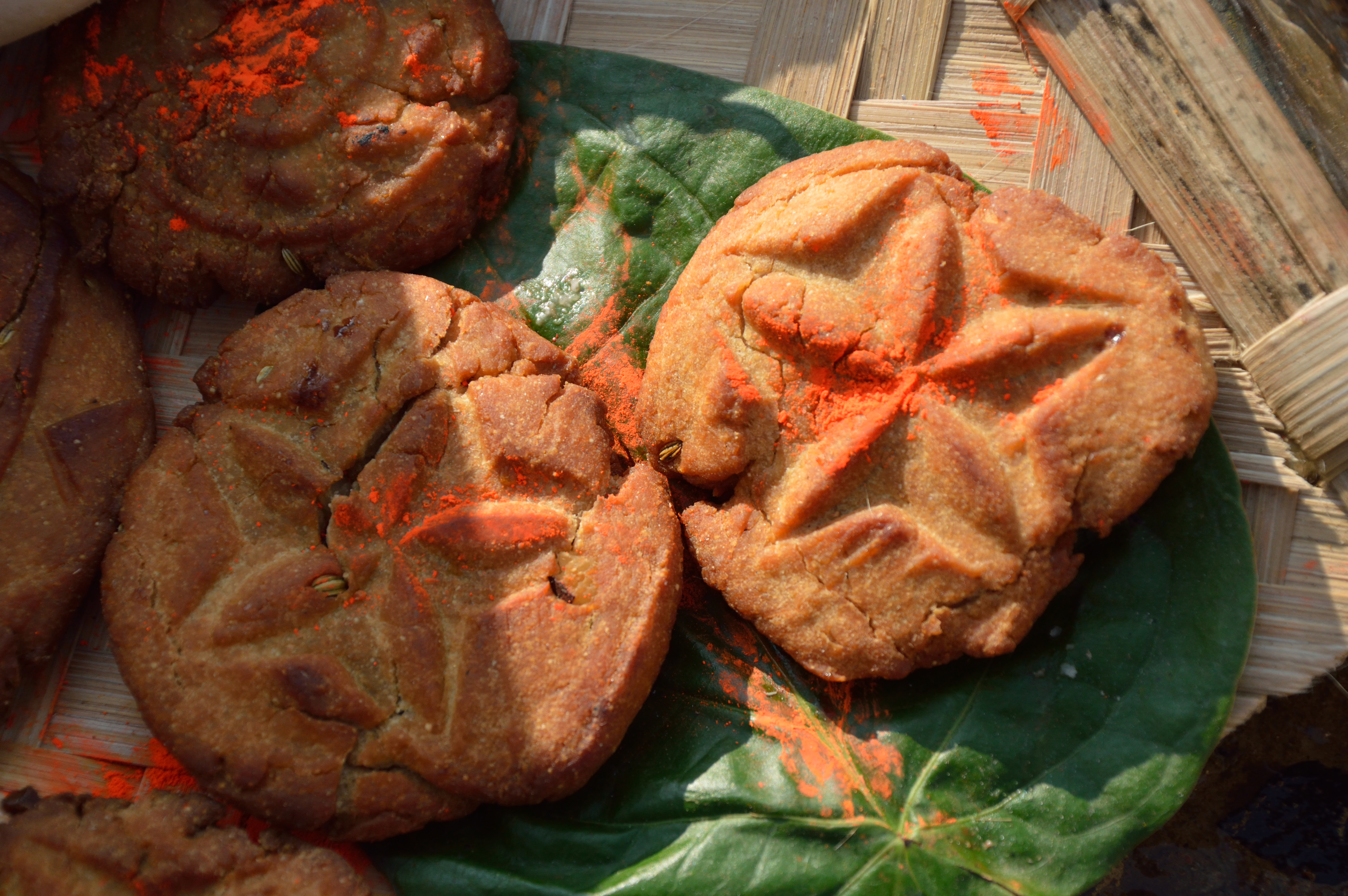
- Alternative names: Khajuria; Tikari
- Course: Snack
- Place of origin: India and Nepal
- Region or state: India: Bihar State; Jharkhand State; Purvanchal region of Uttar Pradesh; Nepal: Madhesh Province; Lumbini Province; Koshi Province
- Main ingredients: Wheat flour, sugar syrup or jaggery, ghee, cardamom, coconut, dried fruits, milk

Thekua, thokwa or thekariis, also known as khajuria, tikari and thokni, is an Indo-Nepalese sweet dish popular in Southern Nepal and the Indian states of Bihar, Jharkhand and eastern Uttar Pradesh. Thekua is a revered prasada, offering to god, during Chhath puja. It has been used as a sweet snack for centuries in these places.

It is widely and popularly used as a 'Koseli Sandesh' (also called Bhojani) in local ancient-traditional culture. 'Kosheli' (it may be fruits, sweets or any edible/potable goods). A 'Koseli' is something which a guest brings to someone's home when he/she arrives there.

== History ==
Thekua, dating back around 3,700 years to the Rigvedic period (1500-1000 BCE), is referred to as 'Apupa' in the Rigveda. Made with wheat flour, jaggery, milk, and ghee, it was first used for its medicinal benefits and later became a traditional offering to the Sun God during Chhath Puja.

== Preparation ==
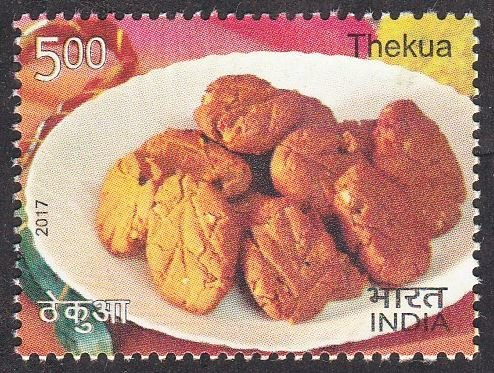
Stamp of India 2017 Festival Thekua

The main ingredients of thekua are wheat flour, chasni (melted sugar) and ghee. Jaggery can sometimes be used as an alternative to sugar. Dough is prepared using these four main ingredients and cardamom can be added to enhance the taste. A special wooden cookie mold is used to form various designs on the thekua. Dough is deep fried in ghee or vegetable oil until it becomes reddish brown. It is soft when hot but hardens after it cools. It needs no preservatives and it can be preserved for several days for eating.

The preparation of thekua for the Chhath celebration is usually done in the worshipping room, to maintain the purity.

== Record ==
A group of 16 people from Darbhanga, Bihar prepared a Thekuwa of 91 kg in 2019 to catch the attention of the Limca Book of Records.
