= Milk sweet =

Milk sweet may refer to:

- Sweets from the Indian subcontinent made with milk
- Dulce de leche, a Latin American confection whose name means "sweet of milk"
