= Sweets from the Indian subcontinent =

Confectionery and desserts of the Indian subcontinent

Mithai
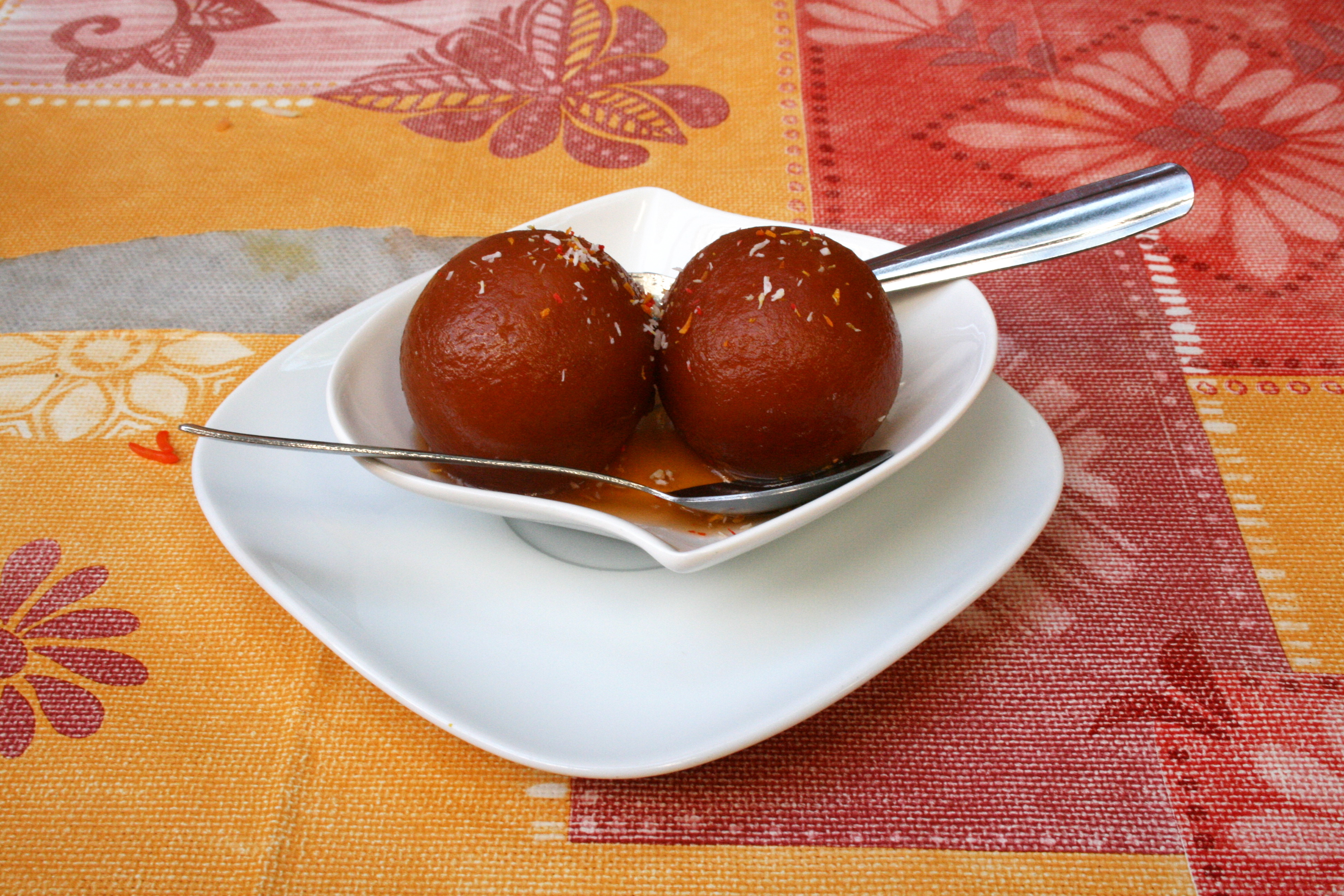
Gulab jamun

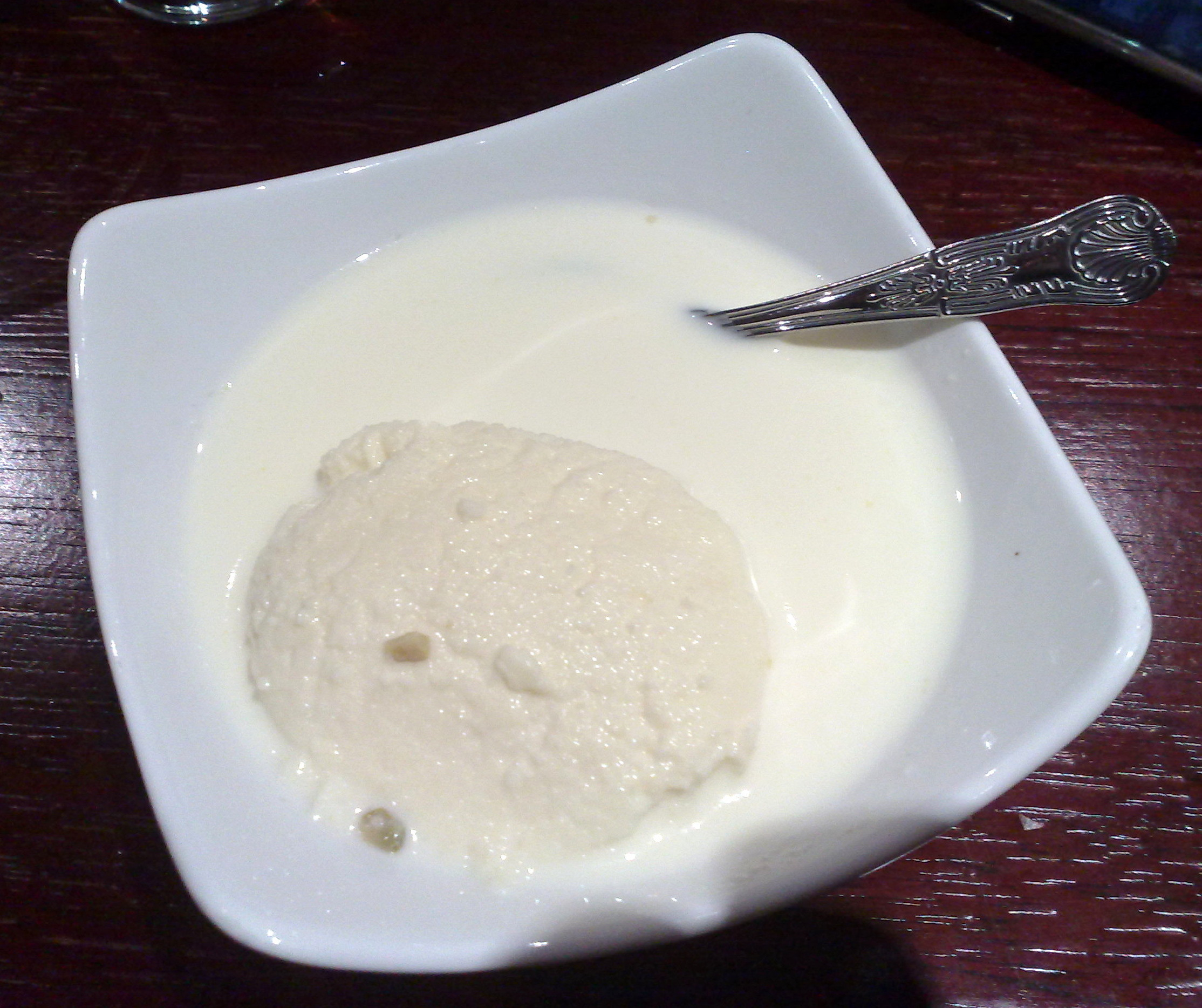
Rasmalai

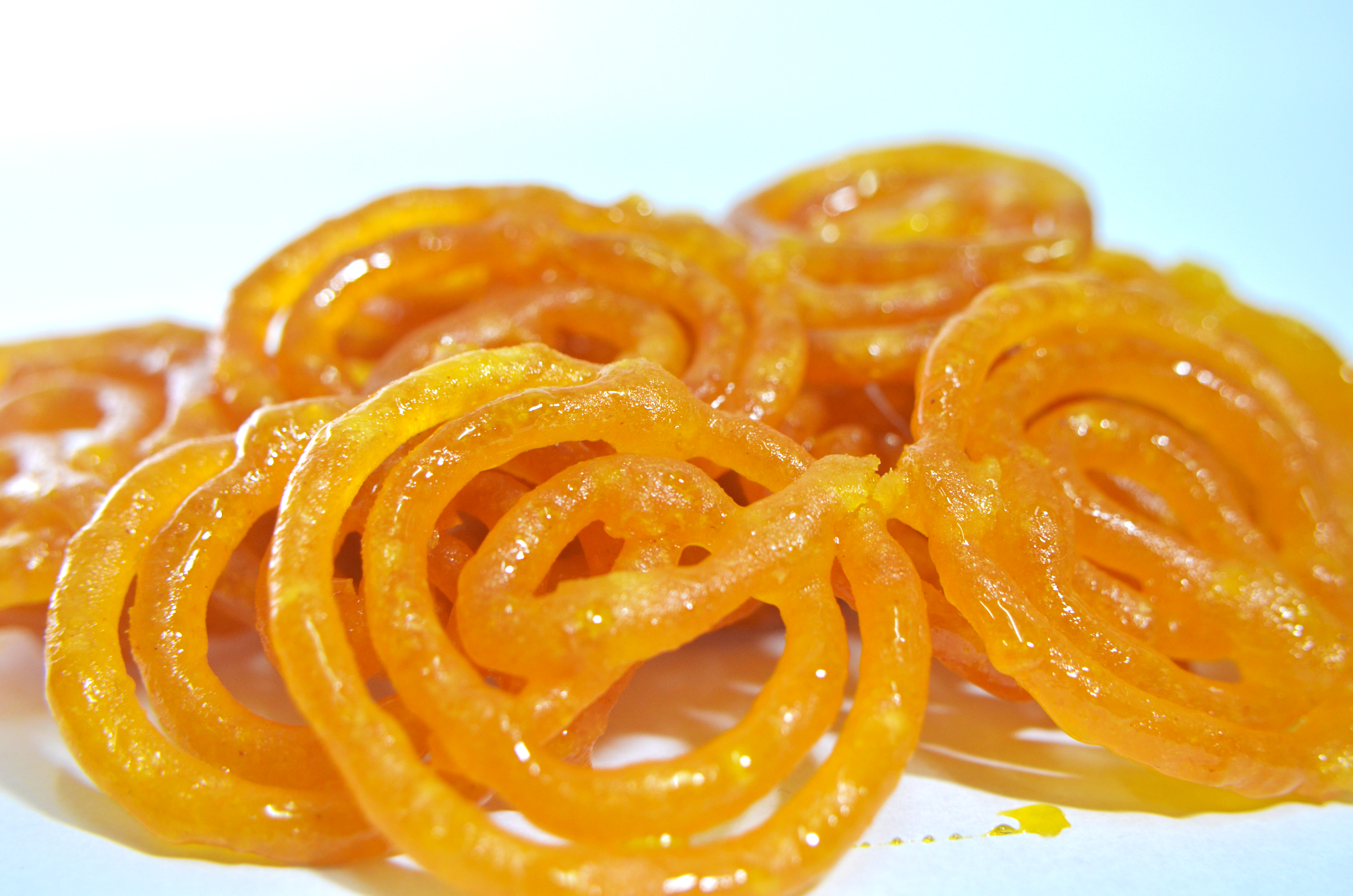
Jalebi

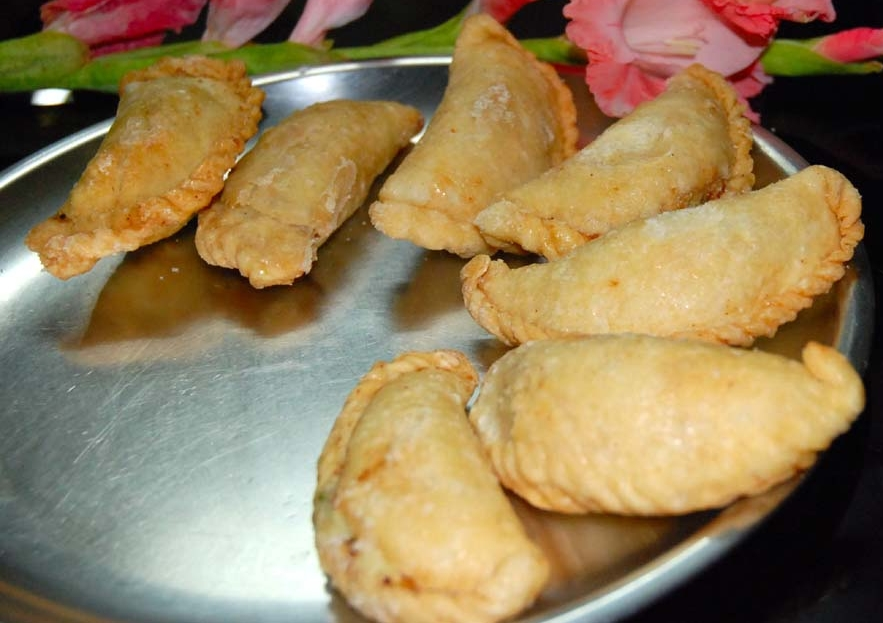
Gujhia

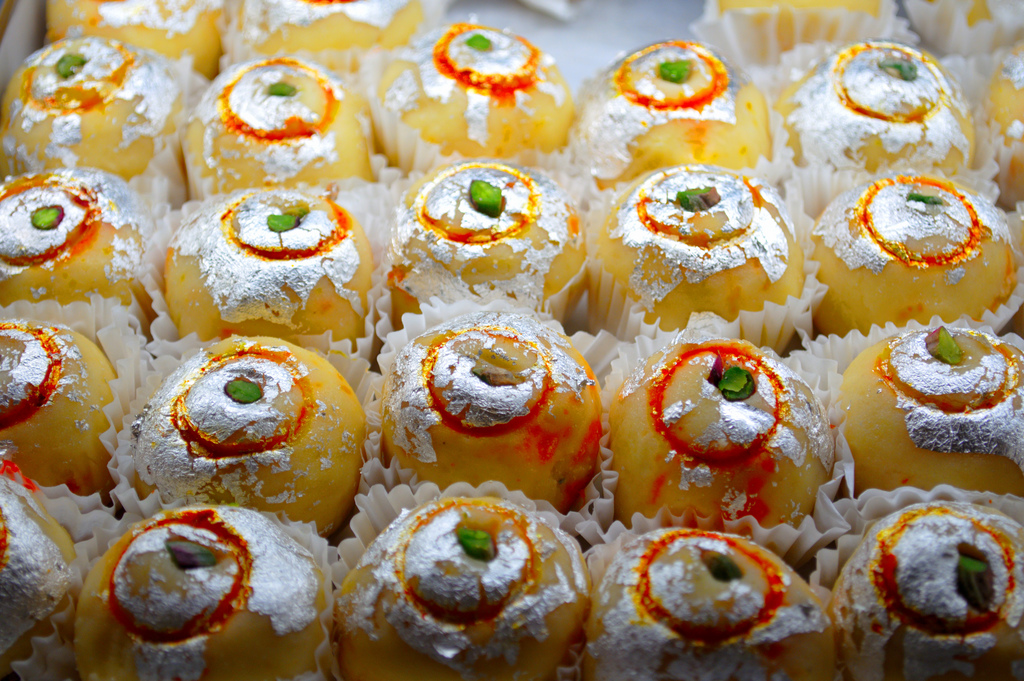
Sweets with vark

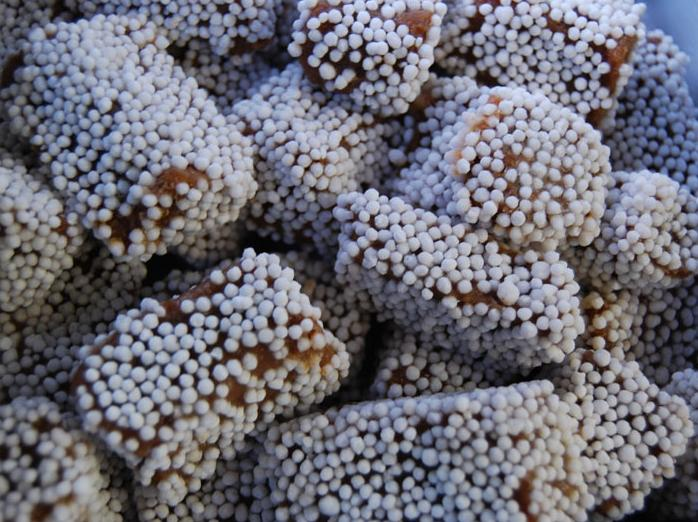
Bal mithai

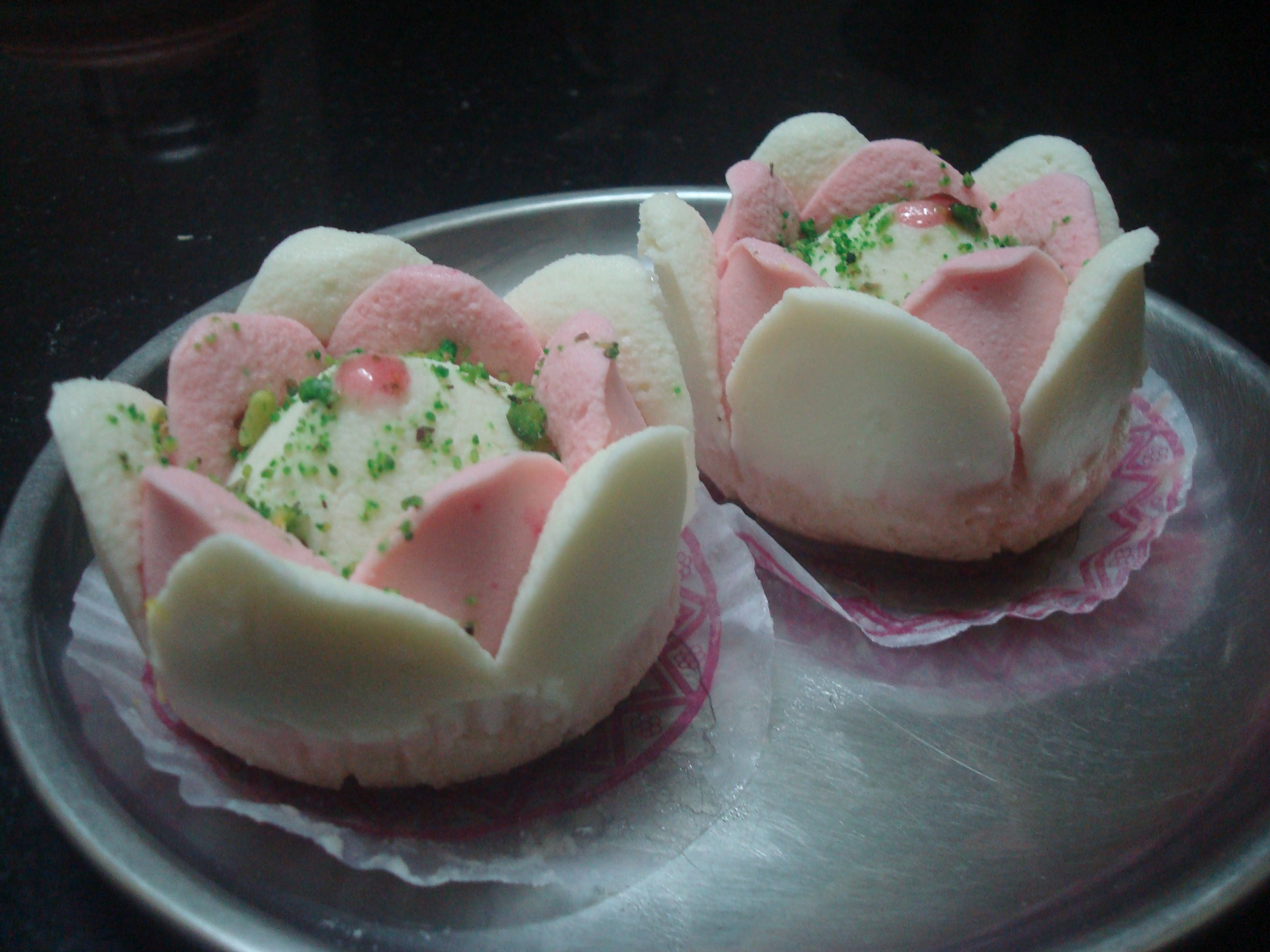
Sandesh

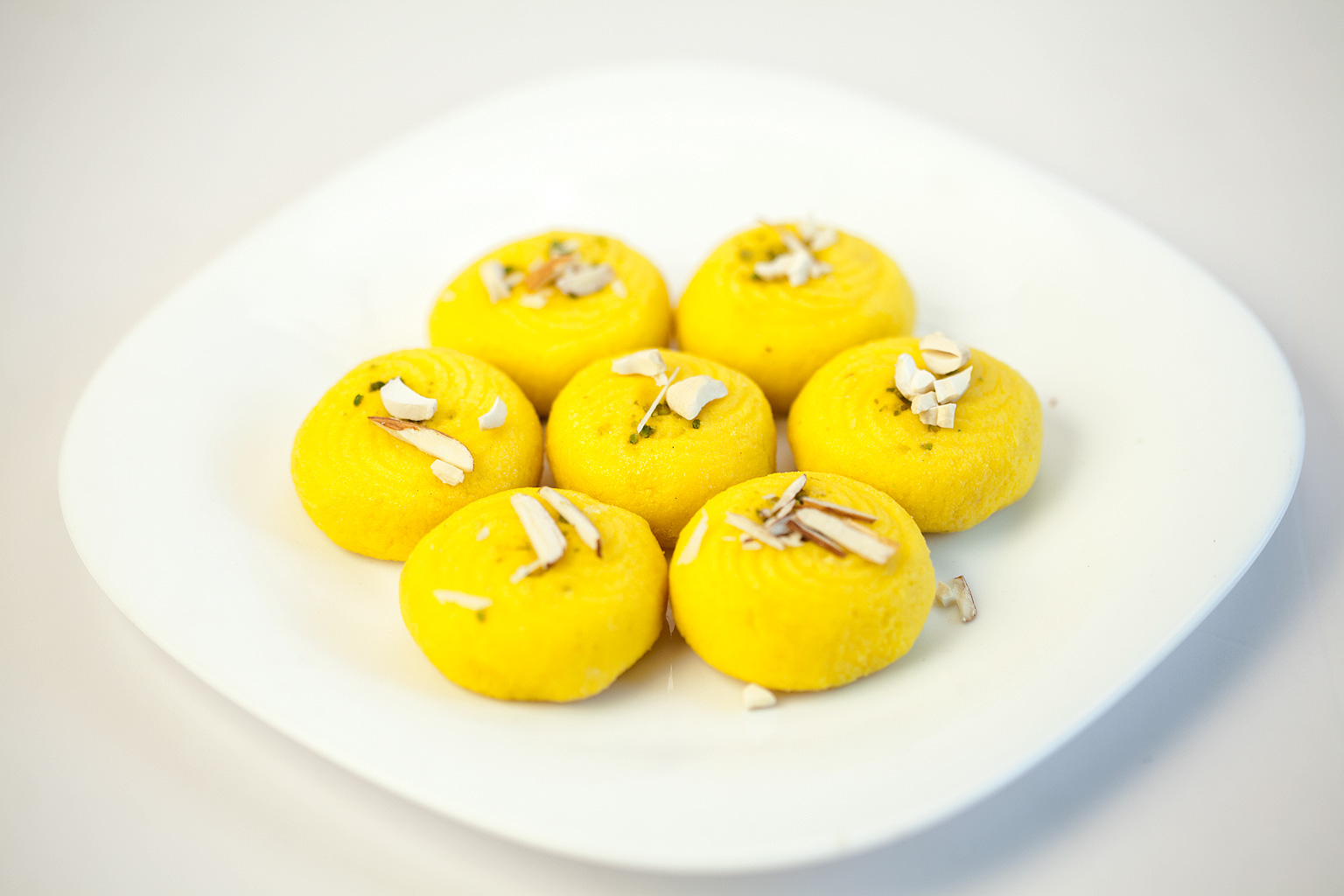
Peda

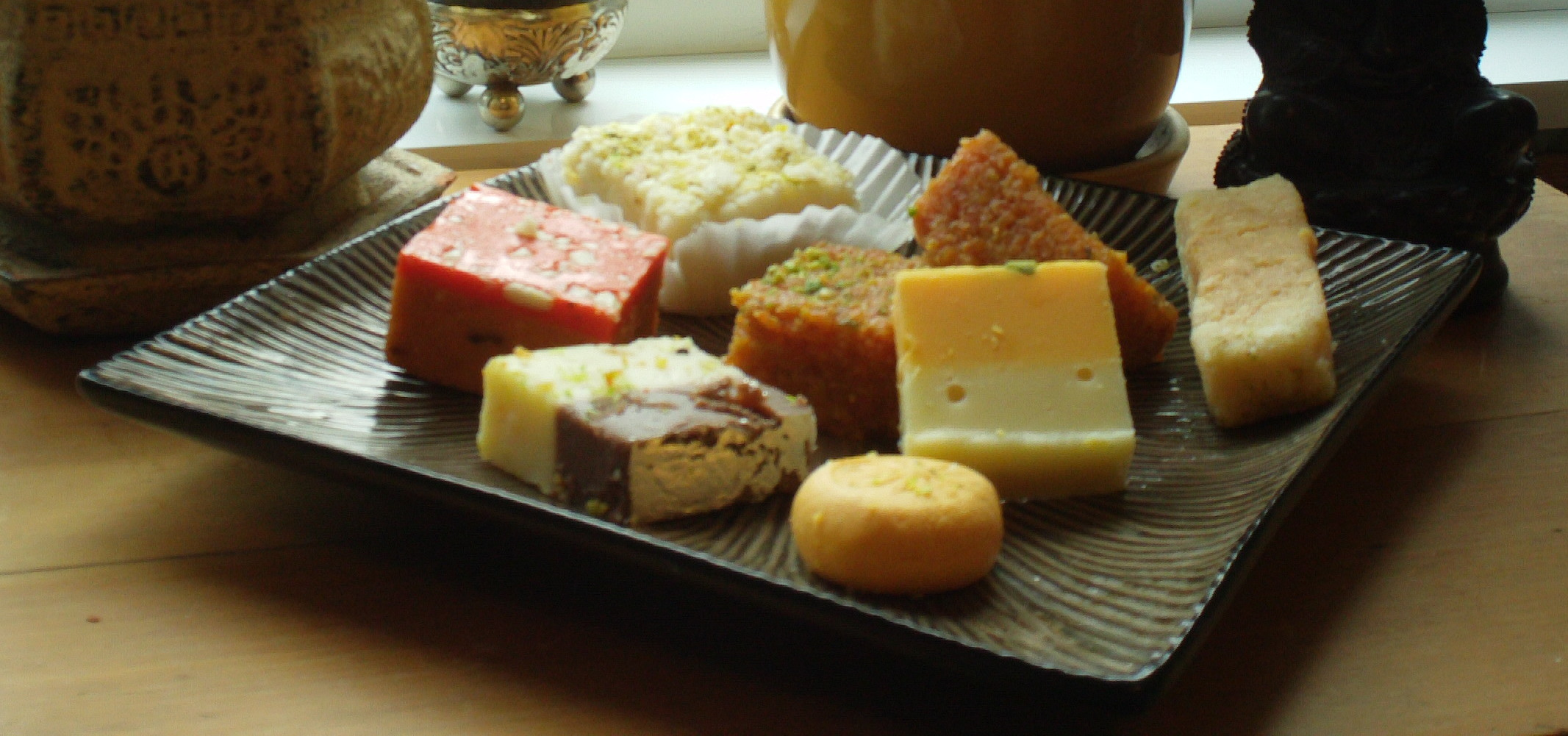
Barfi

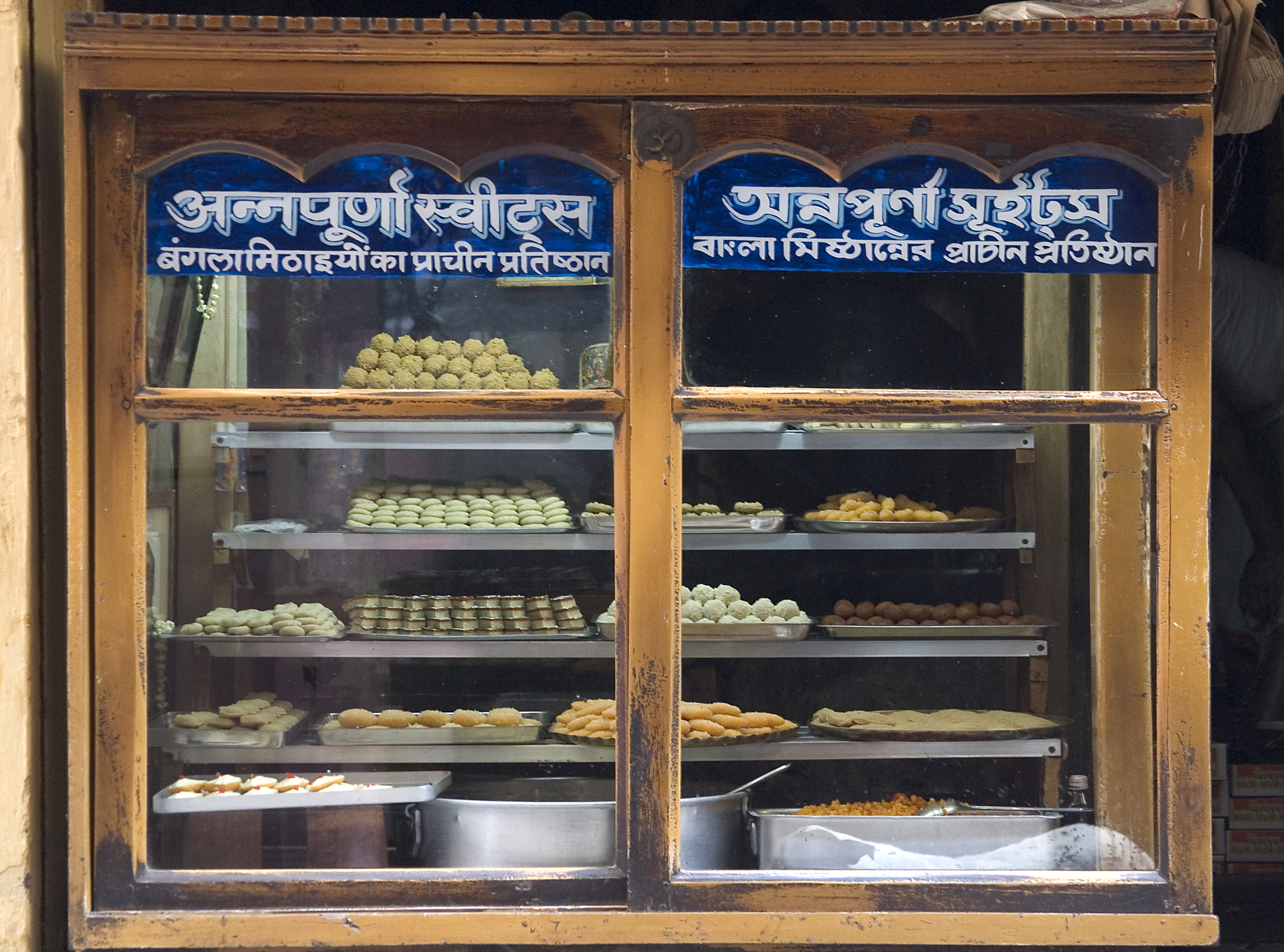
A sweet shop in India

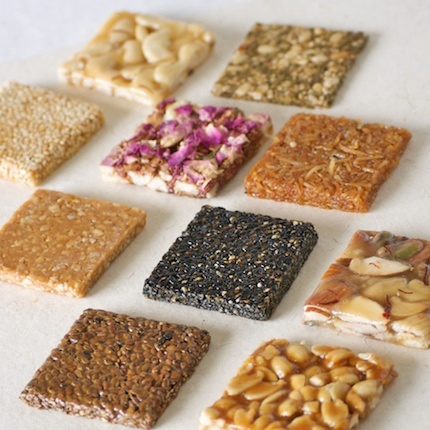
Chikki

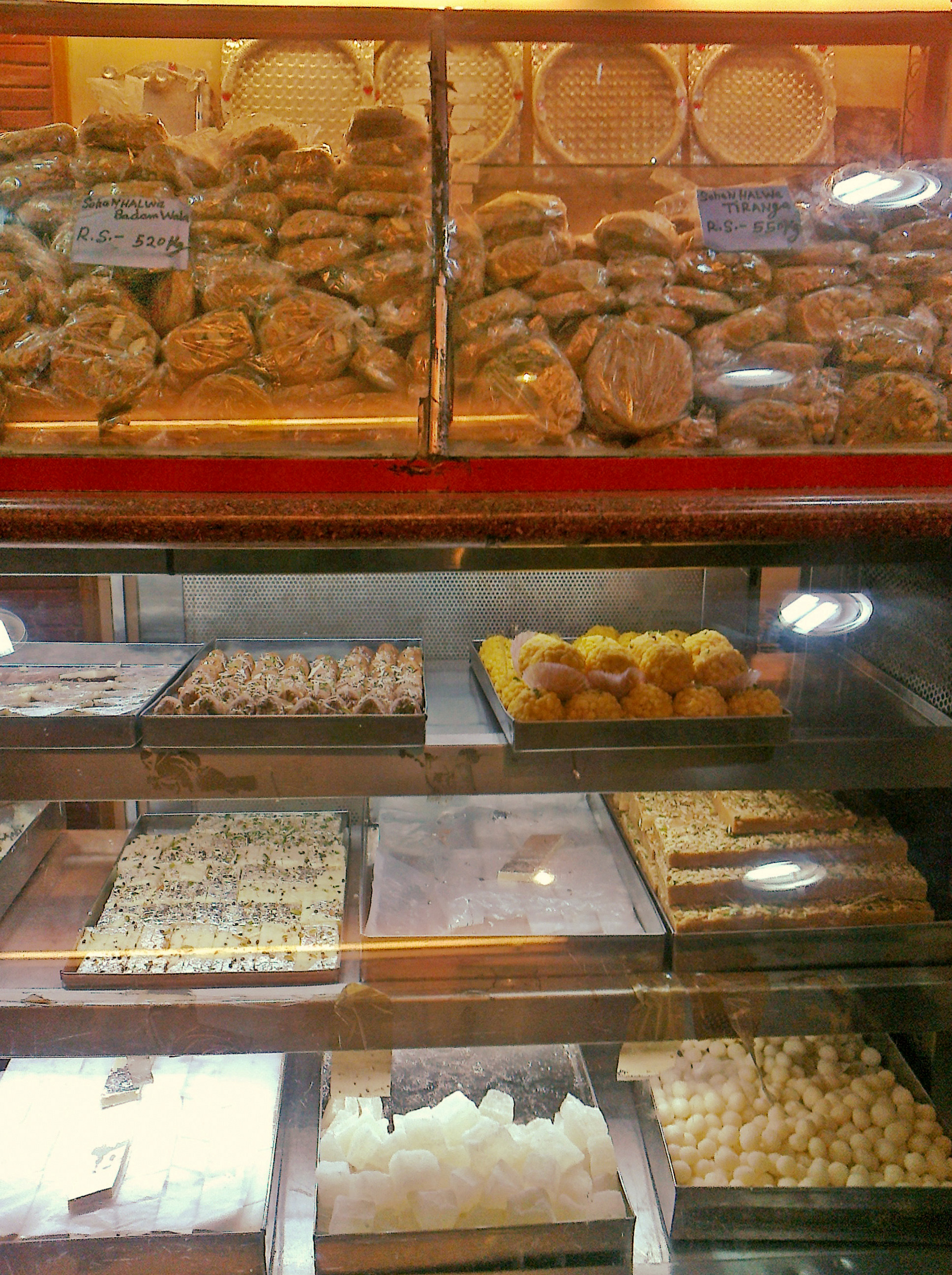
Sohan halwa
A sample of sweets from the Indian subcontinent

Mithai (sweets) are the confectionery and desserts of the Indian subcontinent.

Sugarcane has been grown in the Indian subcontinent for thousands of years, and the art of refining sugar was invented there 8000 years ago (6000 BCE) by the Indus Valley Civilisation. The English word "sugar" comes from a Sanskrit word sharkara for refined sugar, while the word "candy" comes from Sanskrit word khaanda for the unrefined sugar – one of the simplest raw forms of sweet. Over its long history, cuisines of the Indian subcontinent developed a diverse array of sweets. Some claim there is no other region in the world where sweets are so varied, so numerous, or so invested with meaning as the Indian subcontinent.

In the diverse languages of the Indian subcontinent, sweets are called by numerous names, a common name being mithai. They include sugar and a vast array of ingredients such as different flours, milk, milk solids, fermented foods, root vegetables, raw and roasted seeds, seasonal fruits, fruit pastes and dry fruits. Some sweets such as kheer and barfi are cooked, varieties like Mysore pak are roasted, some like jalebi are fried, others like kulfi are frozen, while still others involve a creative combination of preparation techniques. The composition and recipes of the sweets and other ingredients vary by region. Mithai are sometimes served with a meal, and often included as a form of greeting, celebration, religious offering, gift giving, parties, and hospitality in the Indian subcontinent. On South Asian festivals – such as Holi, Diwali, and Raksha Bandhan – sweets are homemade or purchased, then shared. Many social gatherings, wedding ceremonies and religious festivals often include a social celebration of food, and the flavors of sweets are an essential element of such a celebration.

== History ==
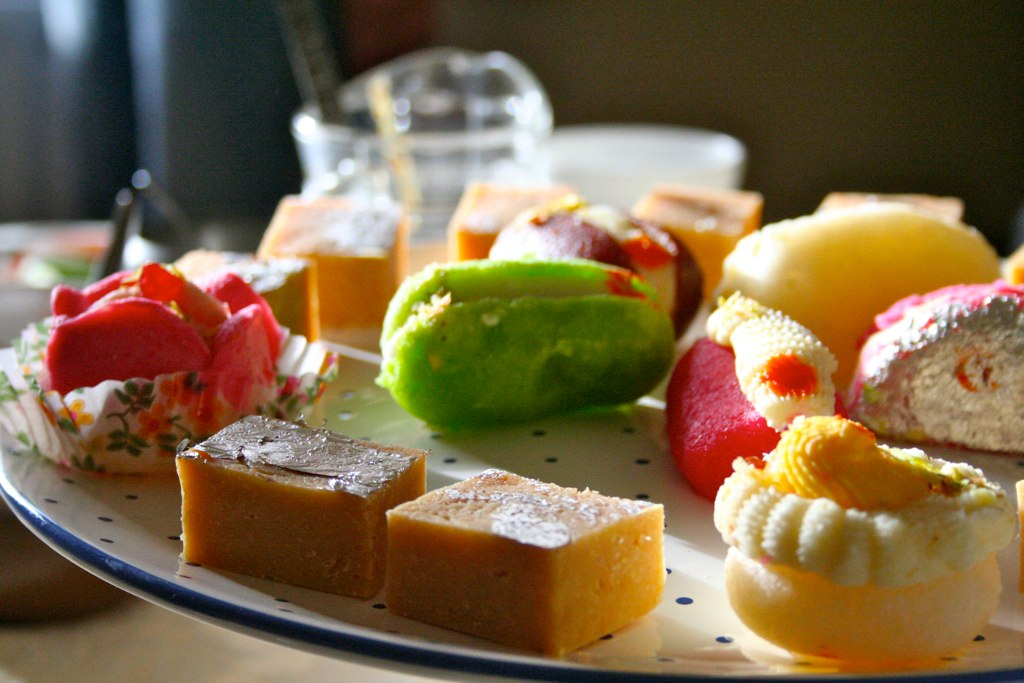
Assortment of Indian sweets

Ancient Sanskrit literature from India mention feasts and offerings of mithas (sweet). Rigveda mentions a sweet cake made of barley called apūpa, where barley flour was either fried in ghee or boiled in water, and then dipped in honey. Malpua preserves both the name and the essentials of this preparation. One of the more complete surviving texts, with extensive descriptions of sweets and how to prepare them, is the Mānasollāsa (Sanskrit: मानसोल्लास; meaning in Sanskrit, the delight of an idea, or delight of mind and senses). This ancient encyclopedia on food, music and other Indian arts is also known as the Abhilaṣitārtha Cintāmaṇi (the magical stone that fulfils desires). Mānasollāsa was composed about 1130 CE, by the Hindu King Somesvara III. The document describes meals that include a rice pudding called payasam (Sanskrit: पायसं), known as kheer in other South Asian languages. The document mentions seven kinds of rice.

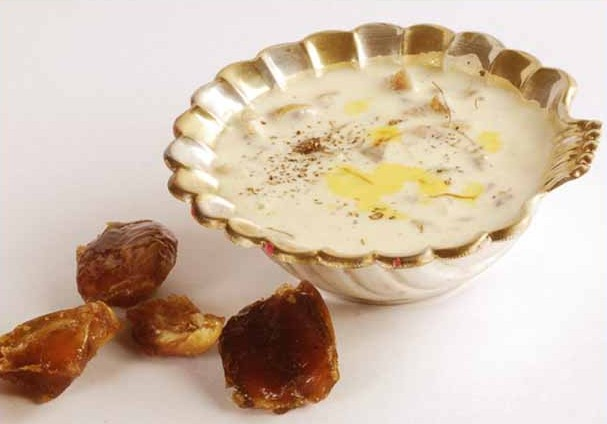
Payasam (or kheer), described in the 11th century Mānasollāsa

Mānasollāsa also describes recipes for golamu, a donut from wheat flour that is scented with cardamom; gharikas, a fried cake from black gram flour and sugar syrup; chhana, a fresh cheese and rice flour fritter soaked in sugar syrup that the document suggests should be prepared from strained curdled milk mixed with buttermilk; and many others. Mānasollāsa mentions numerous milk-derived sweets and describes how to make milk solids and condensed milk. It also contains methods for souring milk to produce sweets.

The origin of sweets in the Indian subcontinent has been traced to at least 500 BCE when, records suggest, both raw sugar (gur, vellam, jaggery) and refined sugar (sarkara) were being produced. By 300 BCE, kingdom officials in India were acknowledging five kinds of sugar in official documents. By the Gupta dynasty era (300–500 CE), sugar was being made not only from sugar cane, but from other plant sources such as palm. Sushruta Samhita records about sugar being produced from mahua flowers, barley (yavasa) and honey and Sugar-based foods were also used in temple offerings as bhoga for the deities which, after the prayers, became prasād for devotees, the poor, or visitors to the temple.

== Varieties ==
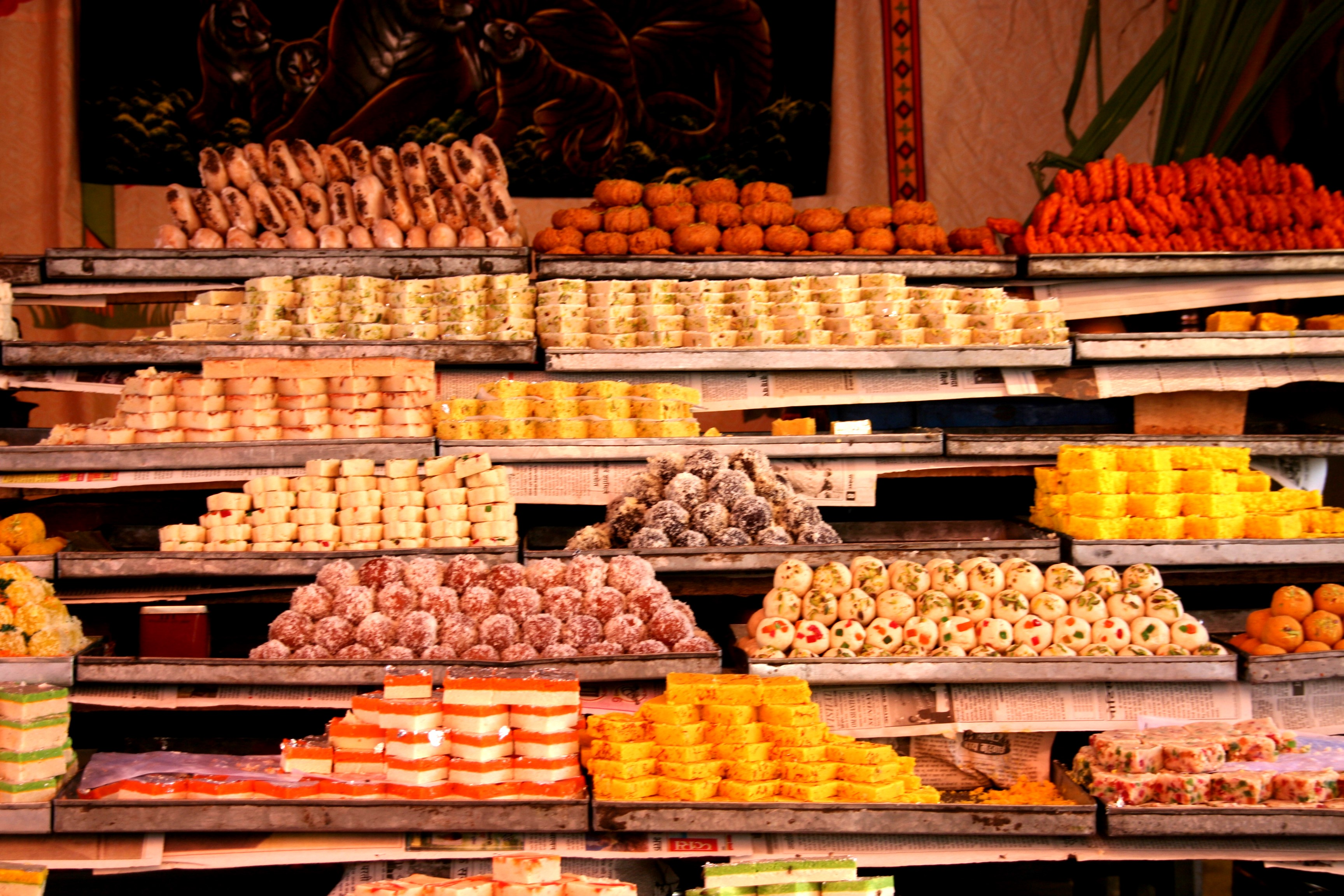
Sweet shop in Rajasthan, India

=== Adhirasam ===
Adhirasam is a sweet similar to a doughnut originating from Tamil cuisine made from rice flour, jaggery, butter and pepper.

=== Bal mithai ===
Bal mithai is a brown chocolate-like fudge, made with roasted khoya, coated with white sugar balls, and is a popular sweet from Kumaon. It is said to be invented in Almora bazaars in early twentieth century and since then has become a symbol of Kumaoni cuisine.

=== Barfi ===
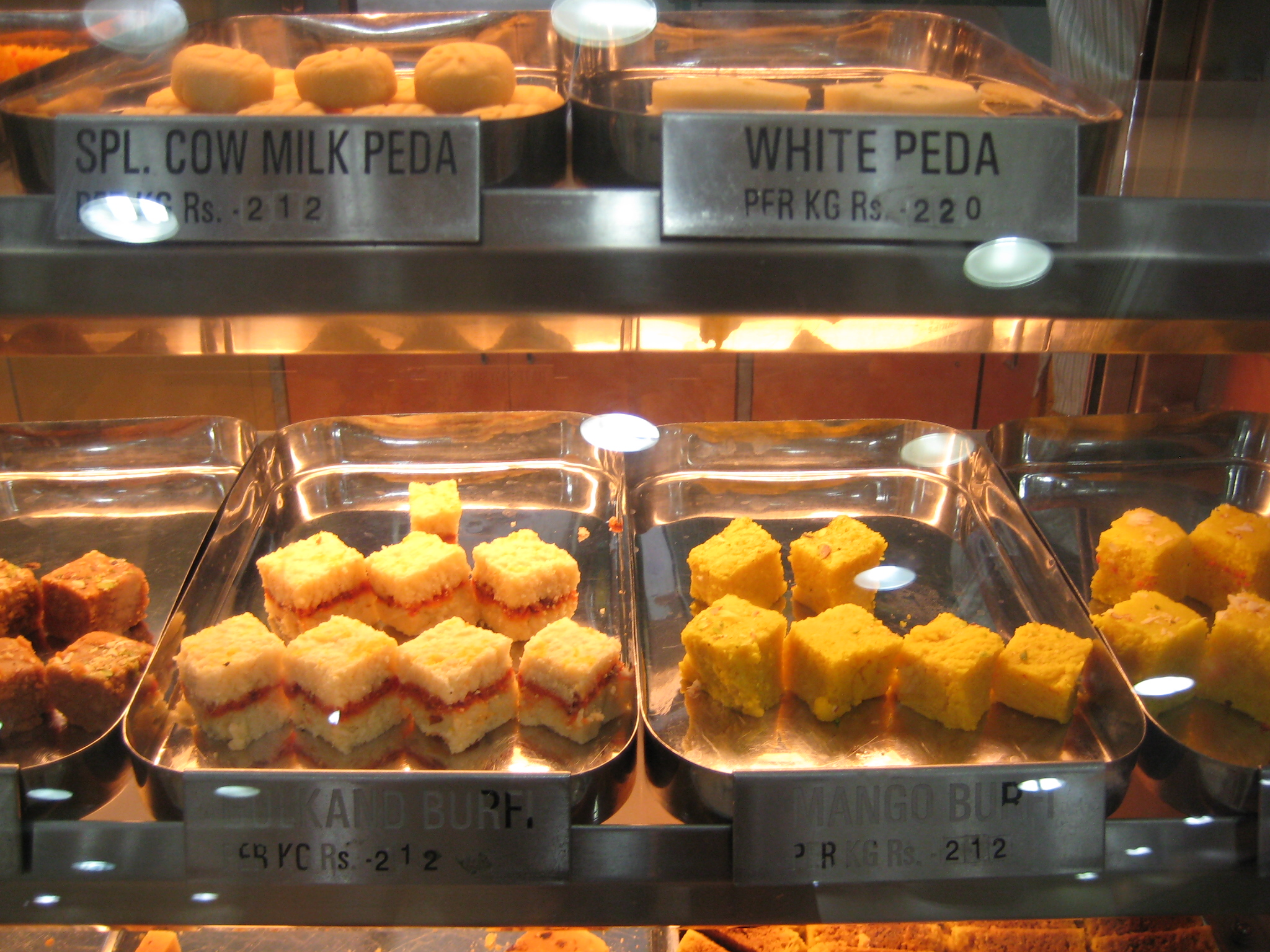
Pedas and barfis for sale

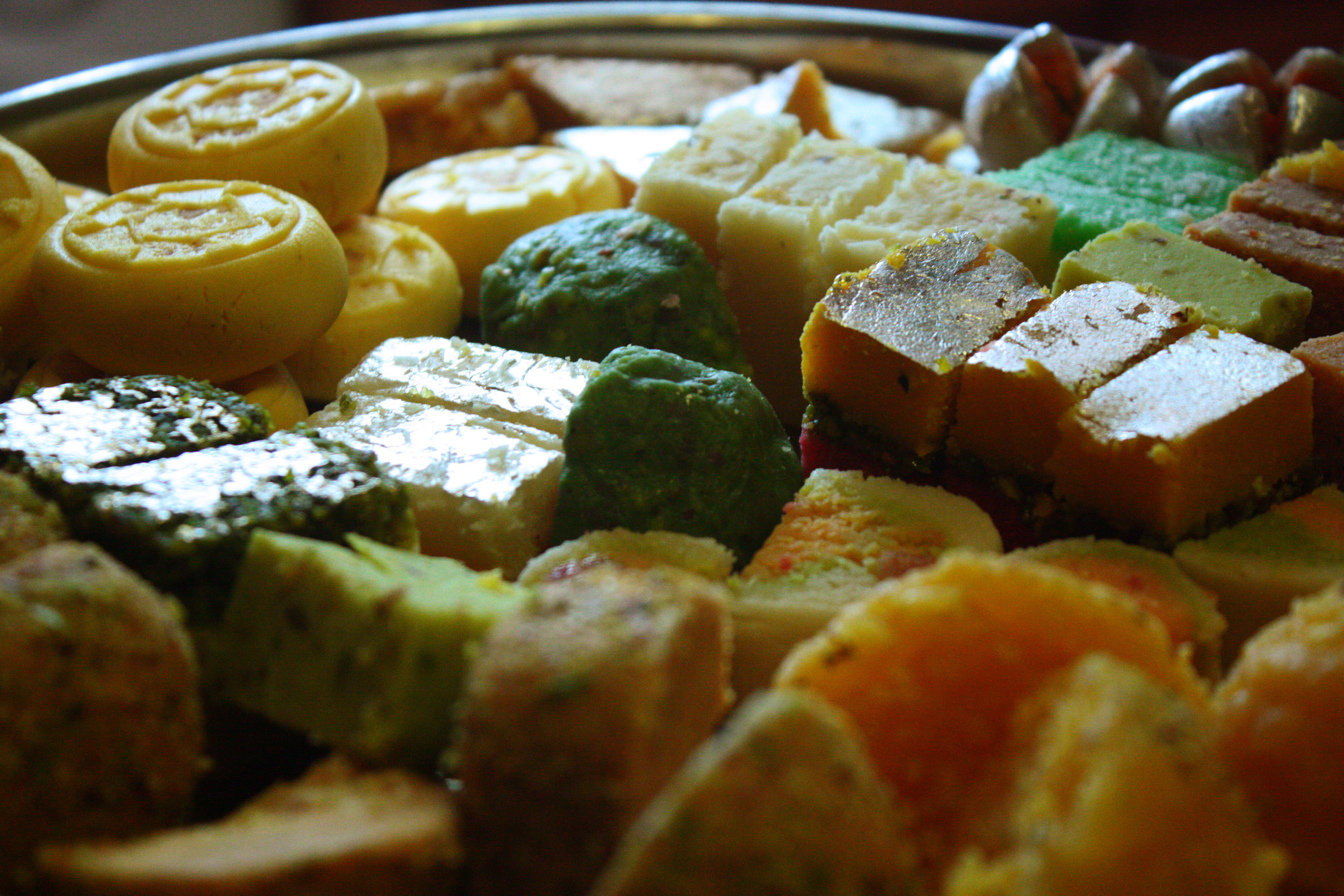
A tray of barfis and other Indian sweets

Barfi is a sweet made from milk solids (khoya) or condensed milk and other ingredients like ground cashews or pistachios. Some barfis use various flours such as besan (gram flour). Barfi may be flavored with pastes or pieces of fruit such as mango, banana, berries, or coconut. They may also include aromatic spices such as cardamom and rose water as flavorings.

=== Chhena murki ===
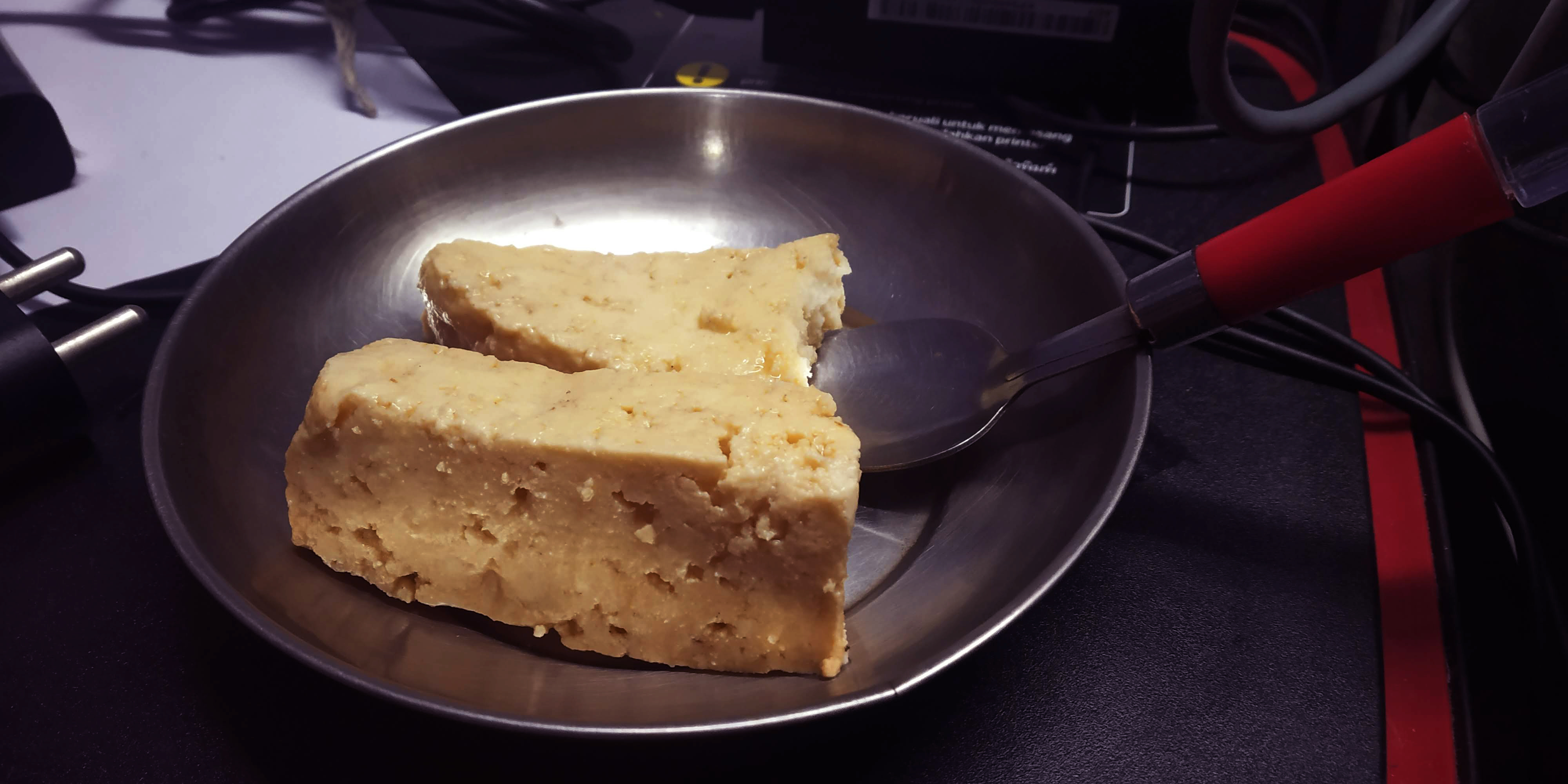
Chhena murki

Chhena murki is a sweet made from chhena, milk, and sugar. It originated in Bhadrak, but is now popular throughout Odisha and other parts of India. To prepare chhena murki, milk and sugar are boiled to a thick consistency. Chhena is soaked in the mixture. Flavorings and spices are typically added.

=== Chhena poda ===
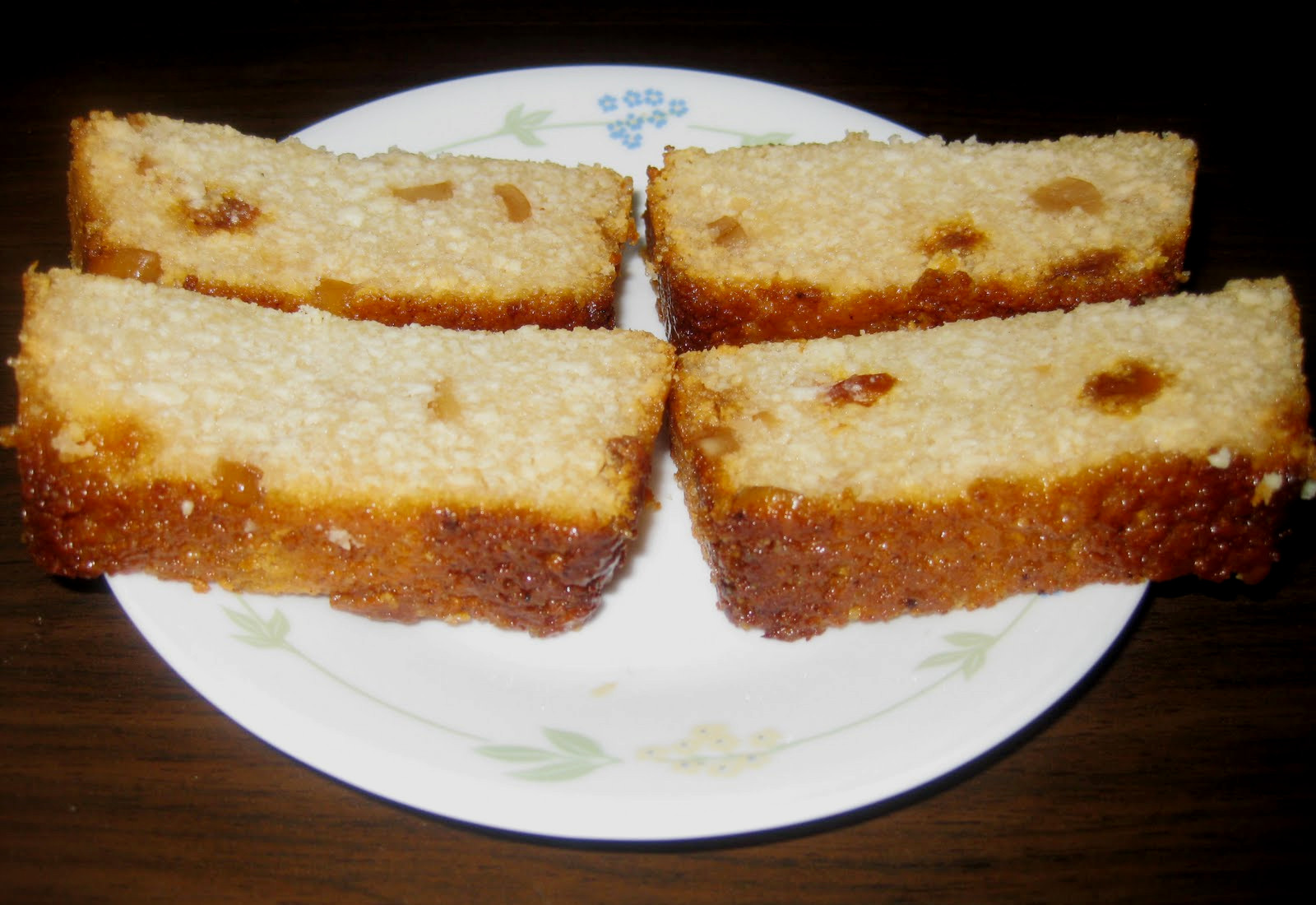
Slices of Chhena Poda

Chhena poda ('burnt cheese' in Odia) is a dessert from Odisha. It is made of well-kneaded chhena, sugar, cashews, and raisins. It is baked for several hours until it browns.

=== Chikki ===
Chikki is a ready-to-eat solid, brittle sweet generally made from casting a mix of dry nuts and hot jaggery syrup. Peanuts and jaggery mix are most common. Other than almonds, cashews, walnuts, sesame and other seeds, varieties of chikki are also prepared from puffed or roasted Bengal gram, puffed rice, beaten rice, puffed seasonal grains, and regional produce such as Khobara (desiccated coconut). Like many Indian sweets, Chikki is typically a high protein delicacy.

=== Chomchom ===
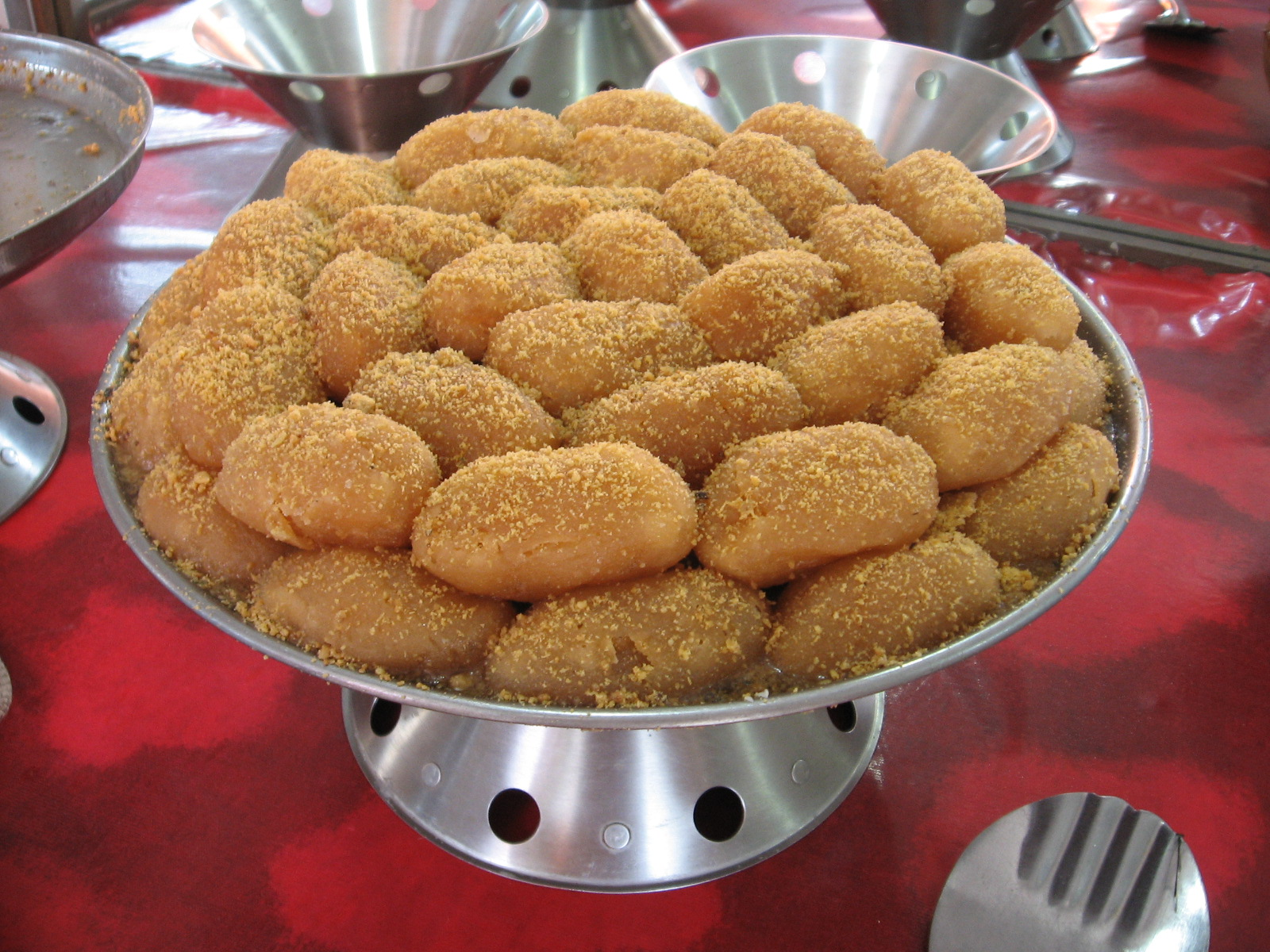
Chomchom

Chomchom is a traditional Bengali sweet, prepared from flattened paneer (a form of curdled milk solids, cheese) sweetened in syrup.

=== Gajar Pak or Gajrela ===
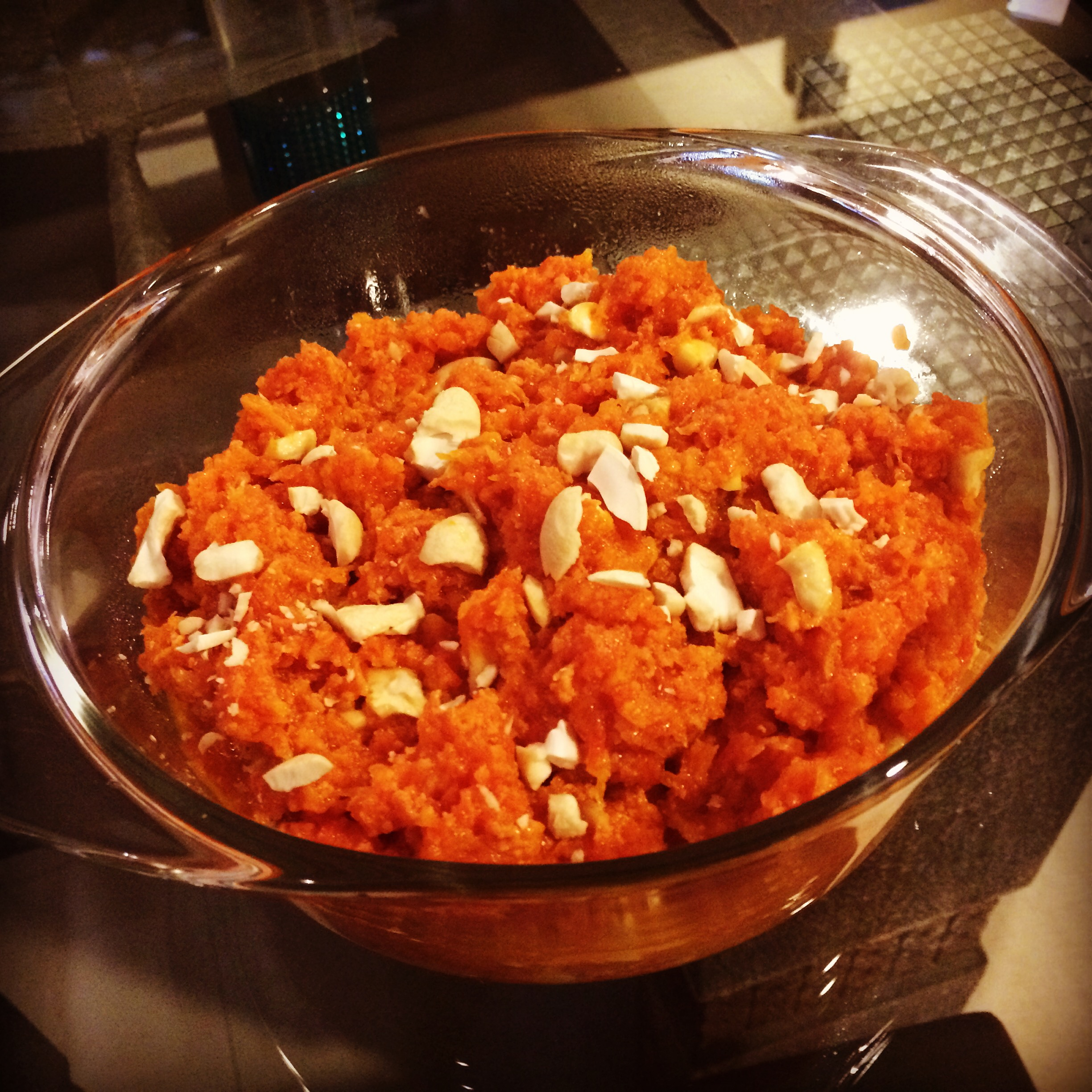
Gajar Pak or Gajrela

Gajar Pak, also called Gajrela, is a seasonal pudding-like sweet made from carrots. It is popular in the North India. It is made by slowly cooking shredded carrots with ghee, concentrated and caramelized milk, mawa (khoya) and sugar; it is often served with a garnish of aromatic spices, almonds, cashews or pistachios. The recipes vary by region. Gajrela may be cooked without ghee and can include cottage cheese or other milk solids for a sophisticated mix of flavors. It is common in Indian and Pakistani restaurants and is a seasonal street and cafe food served during the post-monsoon season through to spring festive celebrations.

=== Gulab jamun ===
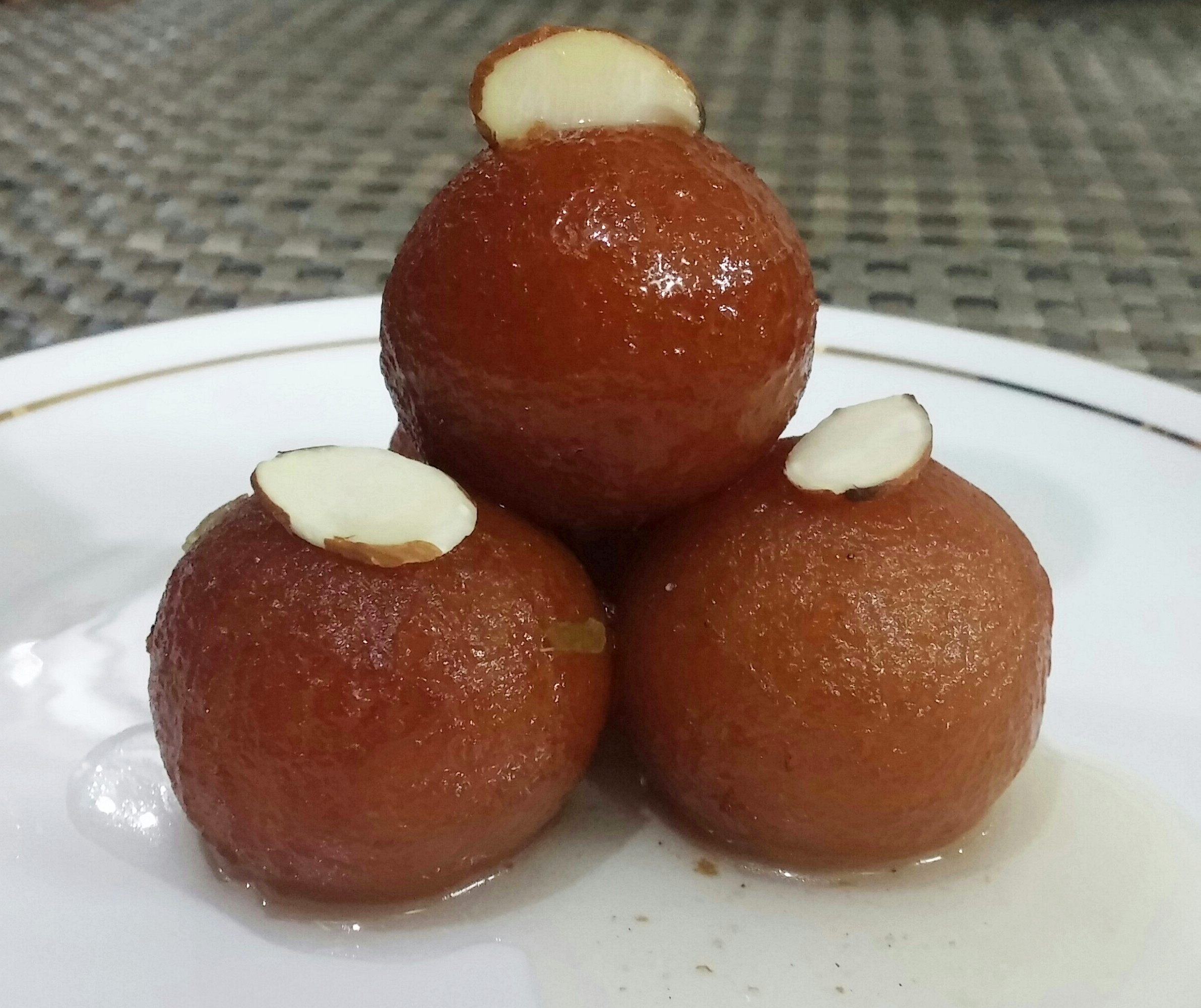
Gulab jamun

Gulab jamun is a popular sweet from the Indian subcontinent. It is traditionally made from khoya, a form of concentrated milk solids, mixed with flour and shaped into balls. The balls are deep-fried and soaked in sugar syrup, which may be flavoured with rose water, cardamom, or saffron.

=== Jalebi and Imarti ===
Jalebi is a sweet made by deep-frying a batter, typically prepared from wheat flour, into spiral shapes and soaking the fried batter in sugar syrup. The batter is commonly made with yoghurt, although recipes vary. Imarti, also known as jaangiri in parts of India, is a related sweet made from urad dal (black gram) flour and shaped into compact, flower-like coils before being fried and soaked in sugar syrup. Jalebi is often served with curd or rabri, while imarti may also be served with rabri.

=== Kesari bhath ===
Kesari bhath is a sweet dish made of semolina, sugar, ghee. Its origins are attributed to Kannada cuisine. It has the consistency of a grainy soft halwa. Semolina is roasted and boiled with very little water when it loses its water content sugar and ghee are added. Often cardamom and Cloves are added for the aromatic smell.

=== Khaja ===
Khaja is a sweet of India. Refined wheat flour, sugar, and oils are the chief ingredients of khaja.

It is believed that, even 2000 years ago, Khaja was prepared in the southern side of the Gangetic Plains of Bihar. These areas, which are home to the sweet, once comprised the central part of the Maurya and Gupta empires. Presently, Khajas are prepared and sold in the city of Patna, Gaya and several other places across the state of Bihar. Khajas of the Silao and Rajgir are known for their puffiness.

Khajas have traveled to other parts of the Indian subcontinent, including Andhra Pradesh and Odisha. The Khaja of Kakinada, a coastal town of Andhra Pradesh, is famous in South India and Orissa. This Khaja is dry on the outside and full of sugar syrup on the inside. The Khaja of Puri is also very famous. Khajas are made by first mixing a batter of wheat flour, mawa and oil. The batter is then deep fried until crisp. Next, a sugar syrup is made which is known as "pak". The crisp croissants are finally soaked in the sugar syrup until they absorb the liquid.

=== Kheer/phirni/payasam ===
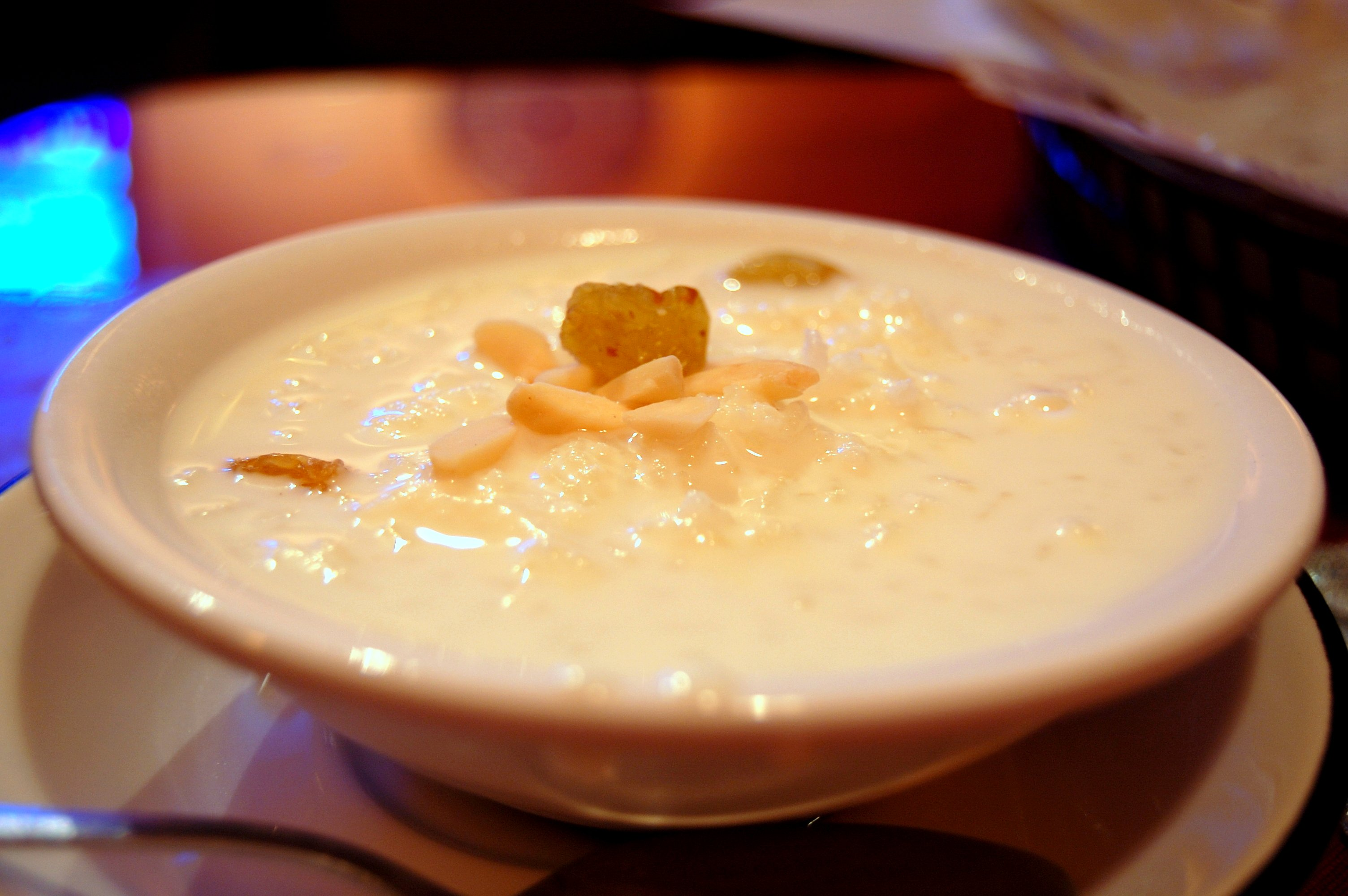
Kheer

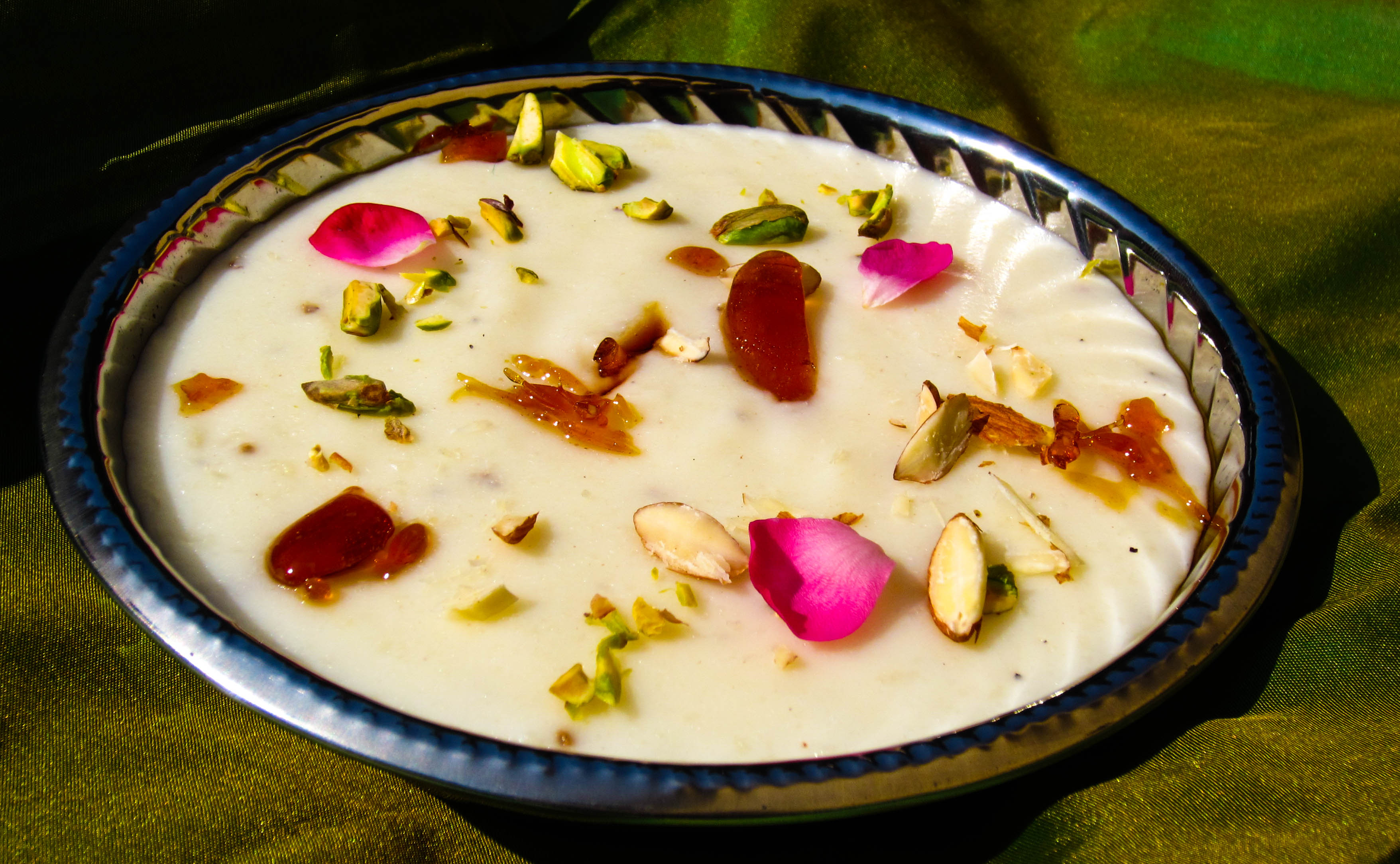
Phirni

Phirni and Kheer are two of the most popular puddings in the Indian subcontinent.

Kheer is a pudding, usually made from milk, sugar and one of these ingredients: vermicelli, rice, bulgur wheat, semolina, tapioca, dried dates, or shredded white gourd. It is also known as payasam. Phirni is a popular variation of kheer.

Payasam has been a cultural dish throughout the history of the Indian subcontinent and is usually served during ceremonies, feasts and celebrations. In many parts of India, ancient traditions maintain that a wedding is not fully blessed if payasam is not served at the feast during traditional ceremonies like marriage, childbirth, annaprasan (first solid feed to child), and other occasions. Other than sweet yogurt, some families serve kheer during the last meal, as auspicious food, before a family member or guest departs on a long journey away from the home.

=== Kozhukatta ===
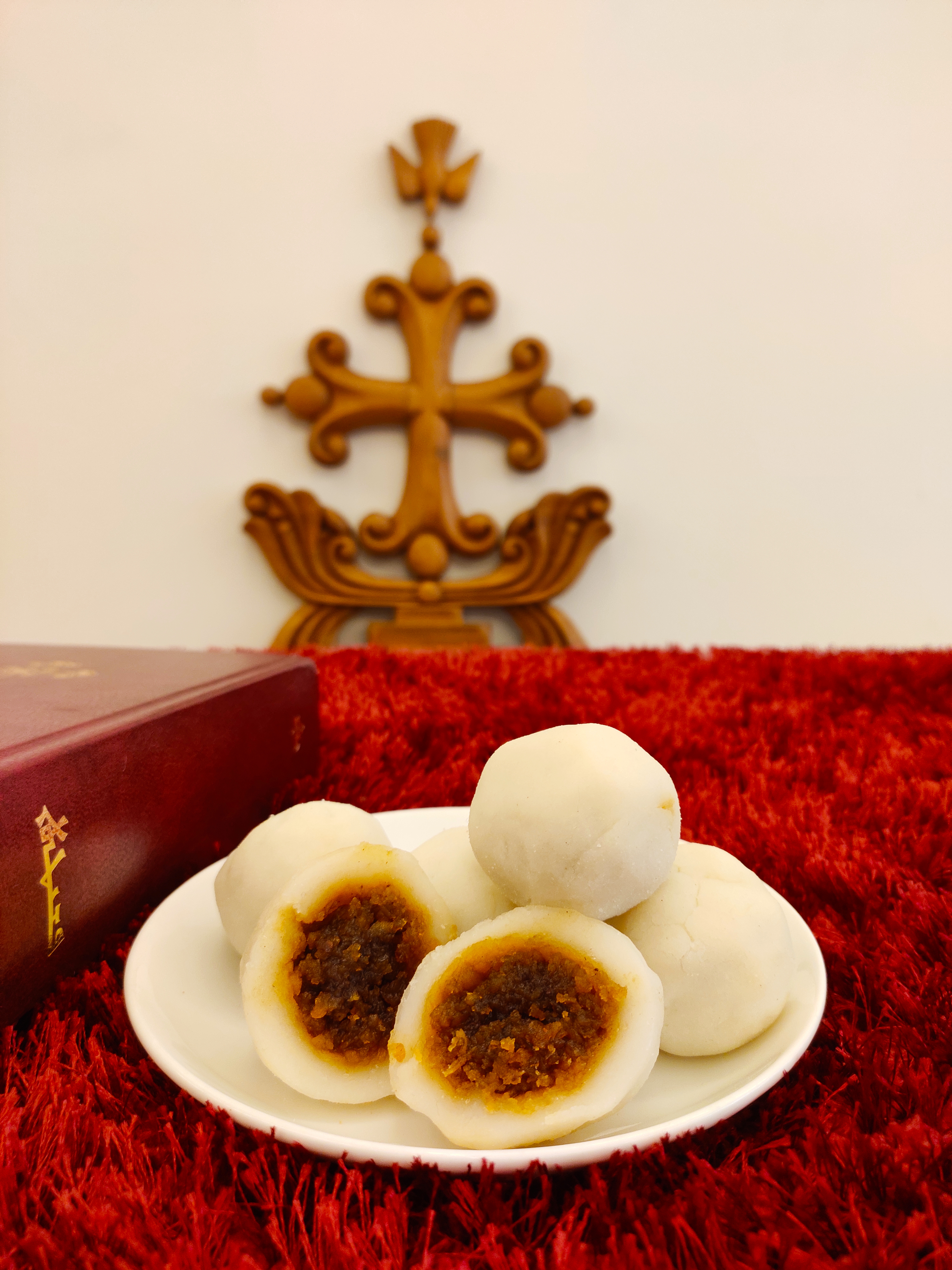
Kozhukatta

Kozhukatta is a traditional sweet dumpling from Kerala and Sri Lankan Catholics. It is made up of thickened rice flour and variations of the filling may include using coconut, jaggery or sugar. It is closely associated with modak and mochi.

=== Kulfi ===
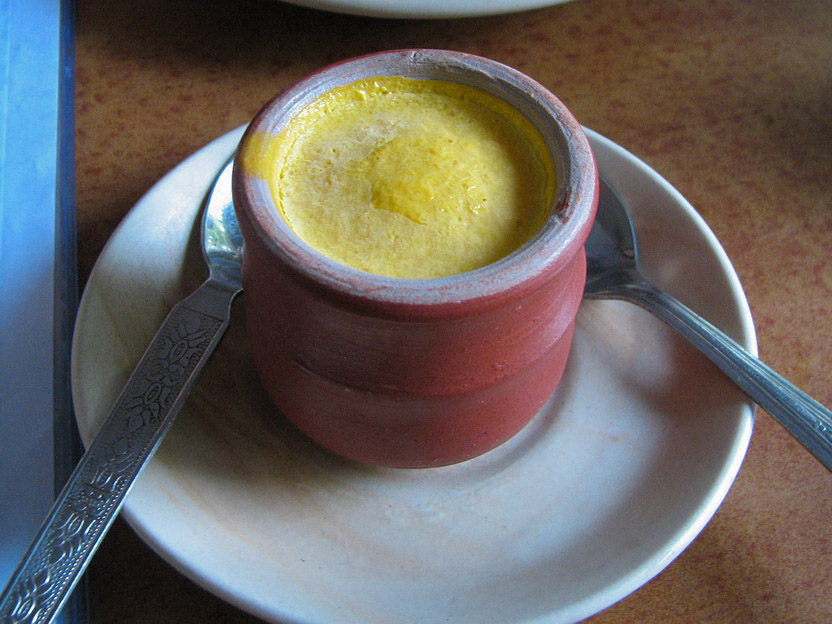
Matka kulfi, flavoured frozen sweet dish made from milk.

Kulfi is traditional South Asian ice-cream. It is made using flavored milk that is first condensed and caramelized by slow cooking along with a small quantity of rice or seasonal grain flour; once condensed, dry nut pastes and aromatic spices are added and the mix frozen in small earthen or metal cans. This creates a dense form of frozen dessert; it is typically served between −10 and −15 °C when it is easier to spoon and eat. Kulfi comes in a variety of flavors such as mango, saffron, pistachios, badam (almond), coconut and plain. It is also a street side summertime snack and festive sweet, which food hawkers carry around in a big earthen pot and play a particular horn music to attract customers. These vendors are known as kulfiwalla (those who sell kulfi).

=== Laddu ===
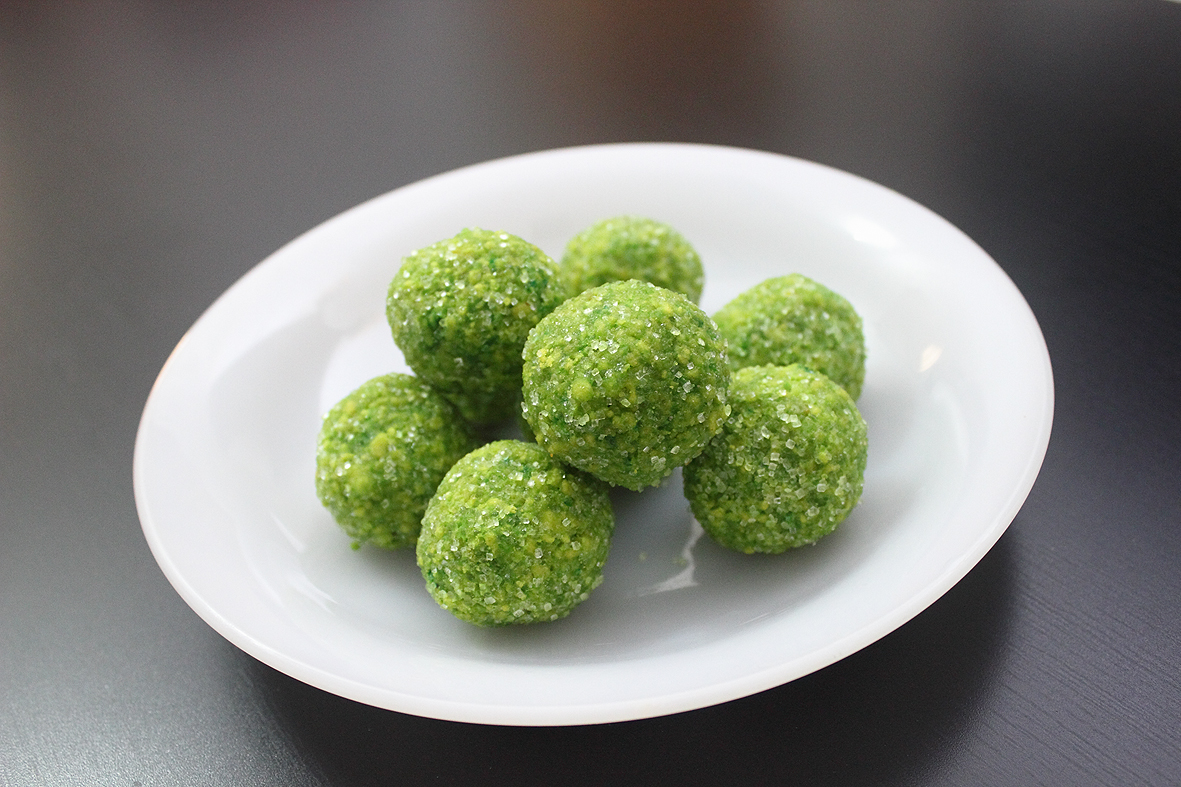
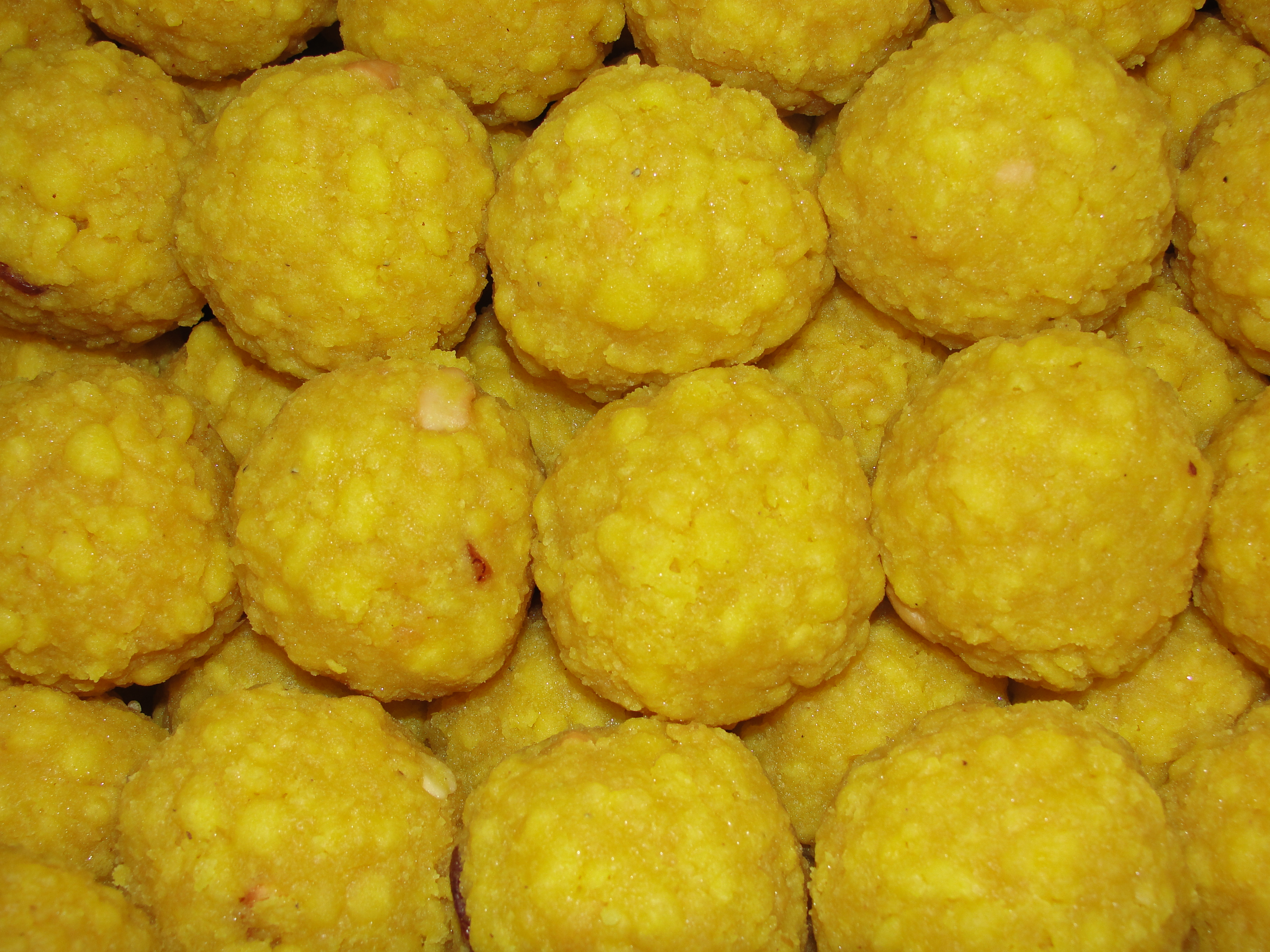
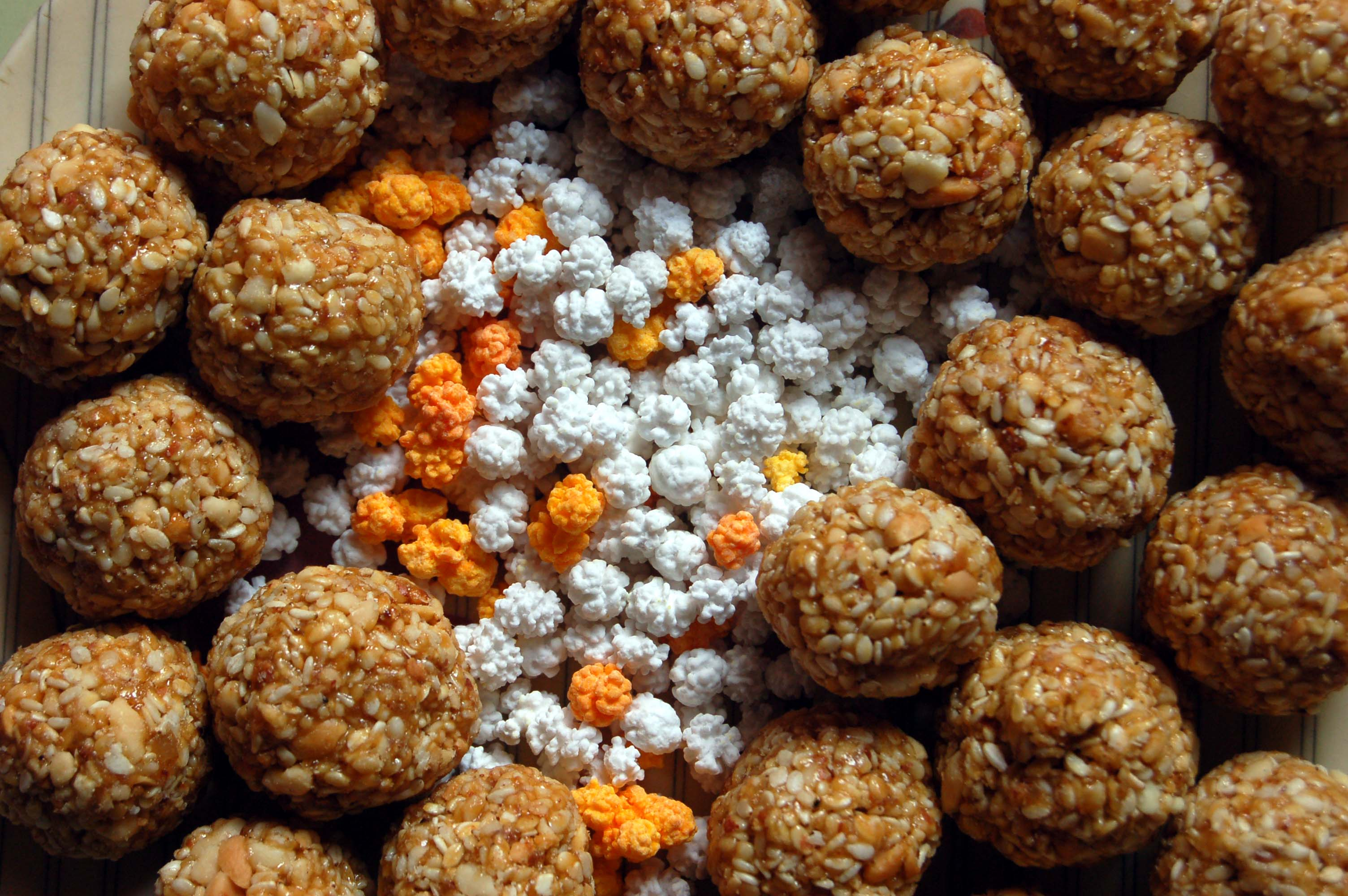
Different kinds of Laddu

Laddu (sometimes transliterated as laddoo or laadu) is made of varieties of flour, grains, pulses, semolina, regional or seasonal fruits, dry fruits, and other ingredients cooked with sugar. These are then shaped into bite-size or larger spheres. Laddu is mentioned in ancient Sanskrit documents as temple offerings, and is referred to as ladduka. It is popular all over India, is easy to prepare, and comes in dozens of varieties. Laddu is often served during festivals, religious ceremonies, or household events such as weddings.

One example of laddu is Motichoor ka Ladoo. It is a sweet food popular in states like Bihar. It is made from roasted gram flour flakes which are sweetened, mixed with almonds, rolled into a batter and then cast into mini balls and fried in ghee. Every mini ball, called boondi, melts like a fresh sweet. The mini balls are combined with aromatic spices and then formed into bite-size spheres, which are called motichoor ka ladoo. With each bite, the mini balls distribute a burst of flavor throughout the mouth. Other examples include Tirupati laddu, so popular that over a million laddu are distributed every week from a single temple of Lord Venkateswara.

In contemporary times, laddu has gained renewed popularity in health-conscious communities. Sugar-free variants are increasingly prepared by replacing refined sugar with dates (khajoor) as a natural sweetener, while ingredients such as flax seeds and mixed nuts are added for their high fiber and nutritional content.

=== Malpua ===
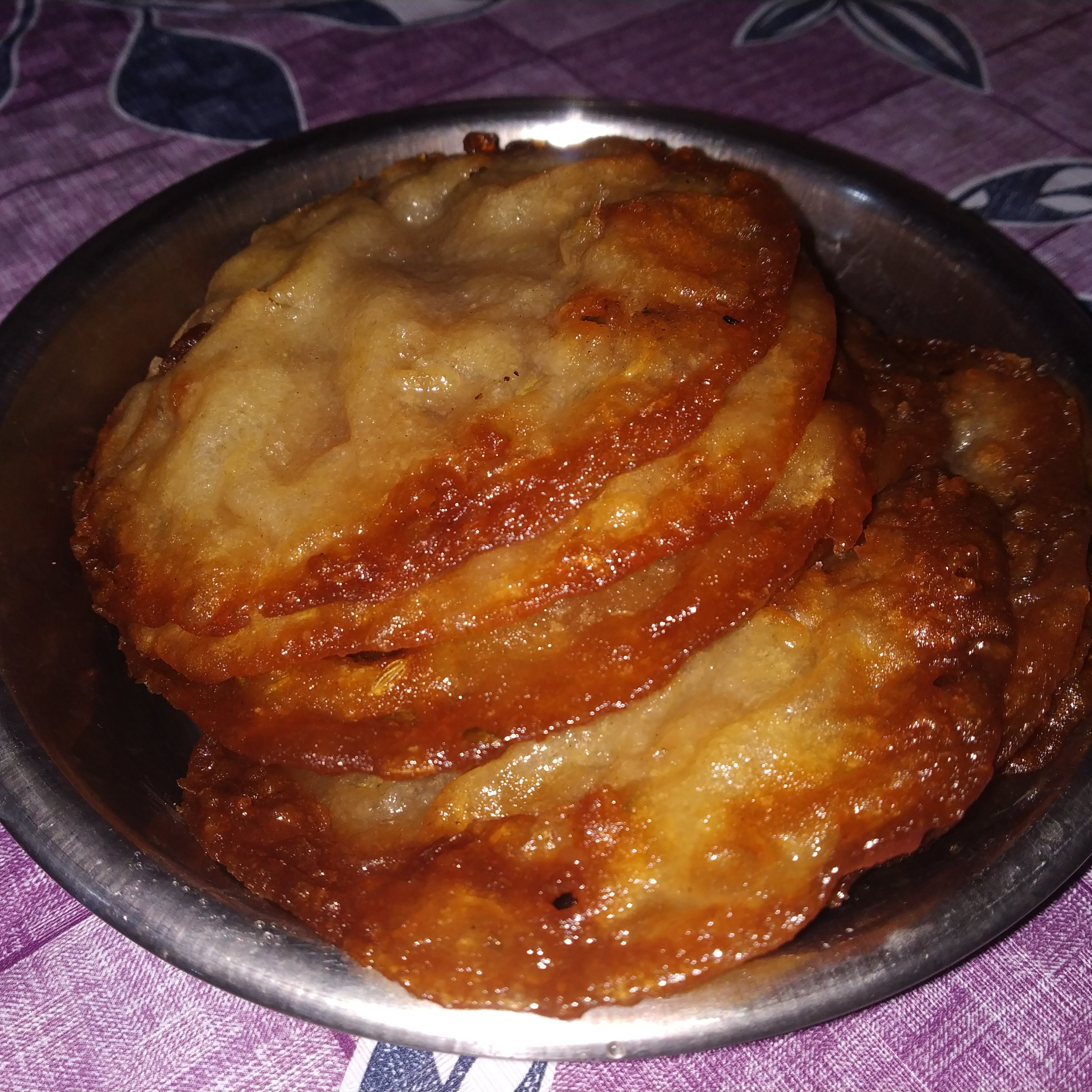
Malpua

Malpua is a deep fried wheat or rice flour pancake soaked in sugar syrup. It is popular in Bangladesh, East India, and Nepal.

=== Pongal ===
Pongal is a sweet dish traditionally made on Pongal, the Tamil harvest festival.

=== Rasgulla ===
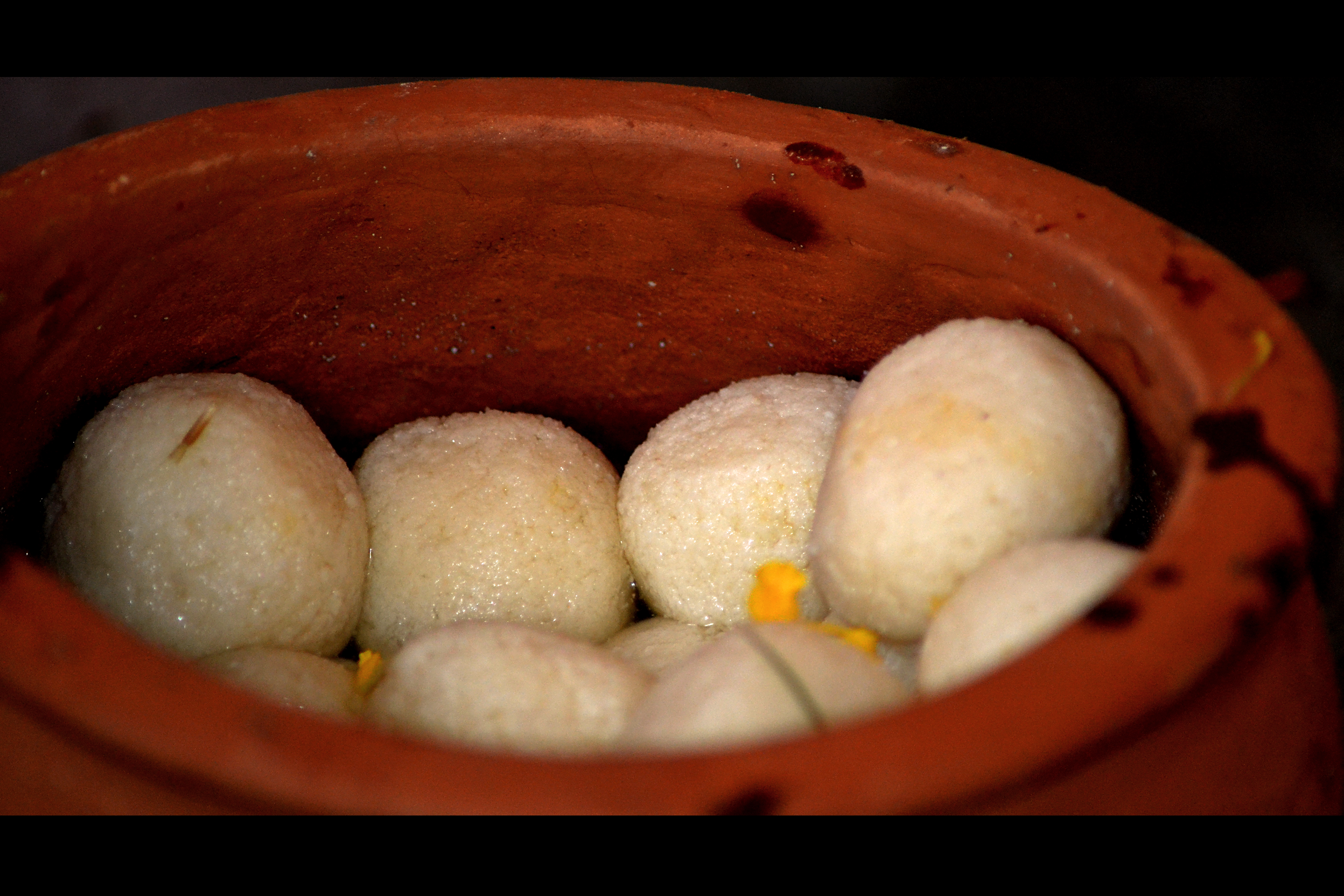
Rasgulla

Rasgulla is a popular sweet in the Indian subcontinent. It comes in many forms, such as Kamalabhog (orange rasgulla), Rajbhog (stuffed with dry fruits and khoya inside), Kadamba (often served with kheer), and Rasamundi, Raskadamba. Some are white in color while others are cream, brown, gold or orange. They are called Rasbari in Nepal. This dish is made by boiling small dumplings made of a mixture of chhenna and semolina in sugar syrup. Once cooked, these are stored in the syrup, making them spongy. Increasing the semolina content reduces the sponginess of the dessert and hardens them, creating a variety of textures. Some Rasgulla are stuffed inside with treats, such as dry fruits, raisins, candied peel, and other delicacies to create a variety of flavors. Some versions, called danedhar, are removed from the syrup and sugar-coated into different fruit shapes and other creative designs. These are festive foods found year-round in many parts of India.

=== Ras malai ===
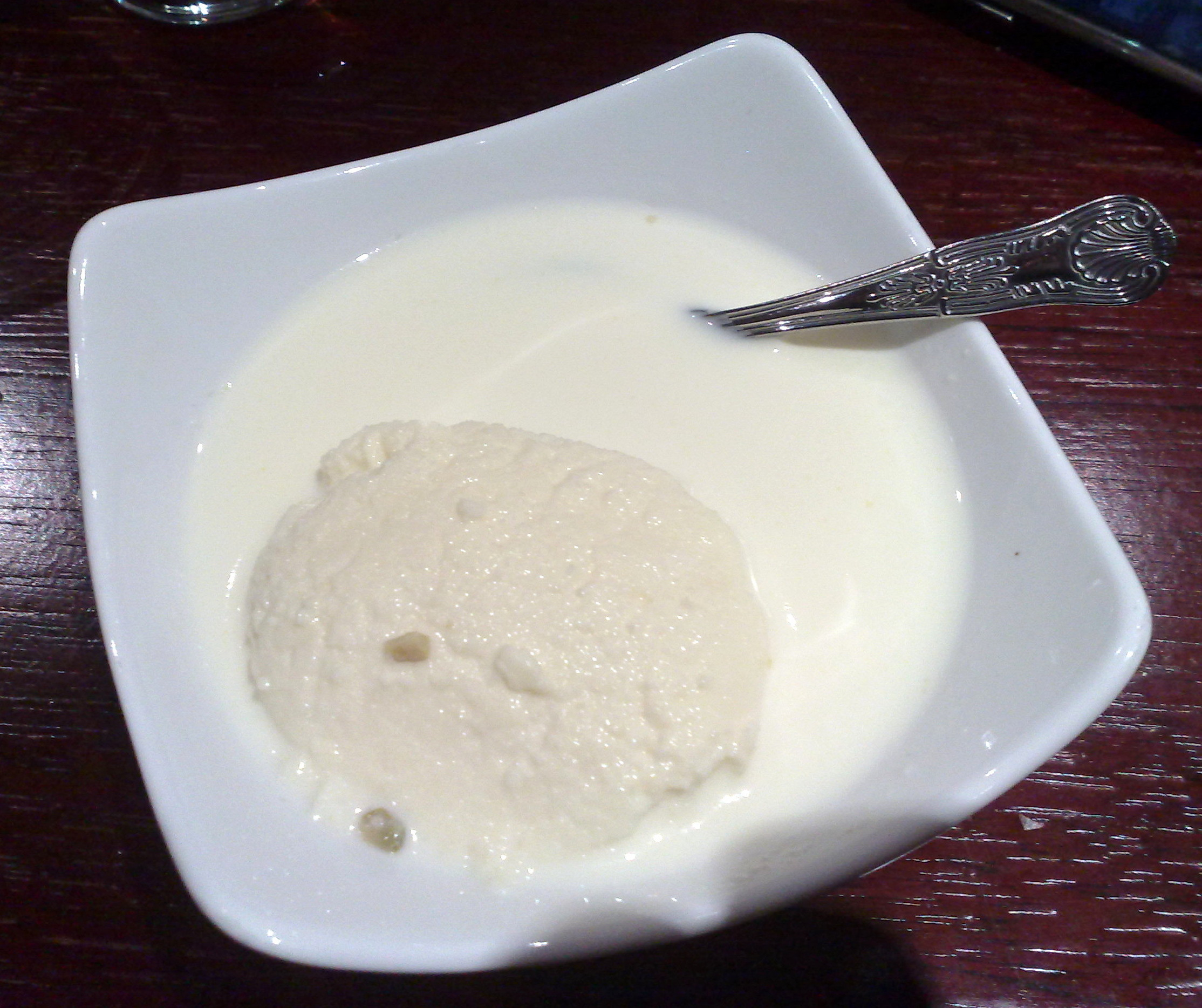
Ras malai

Ras malai consists of flattened balls of chhena (cheese curds) soaked in malai (clotted cream) flavored with cardamom. Its name comes from the Hindu/Urdu ras, "juice," and malai, "cream."

=== Sandesh ===
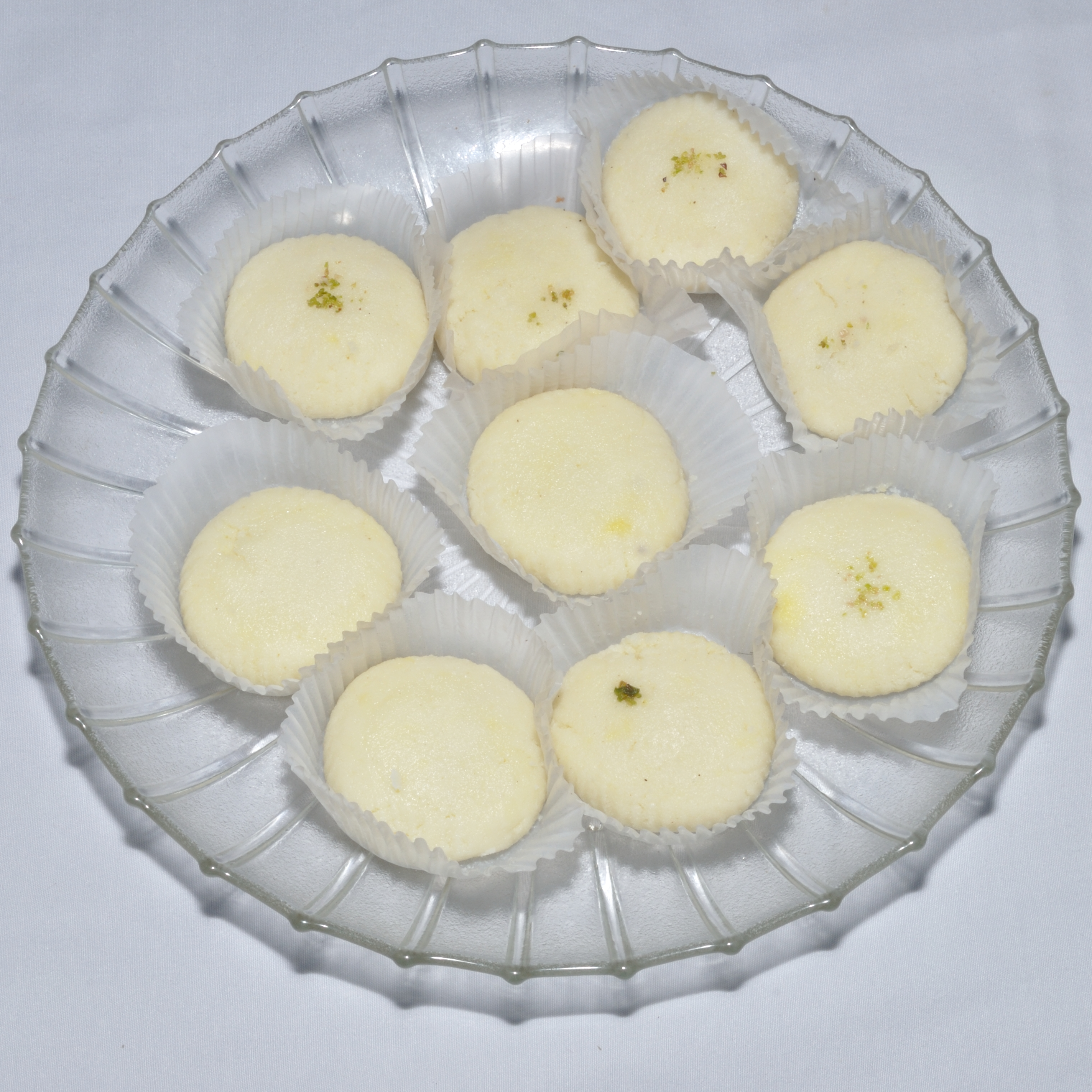
Sandesh from Kolkata

Sandesh is a Bengali sweet made from chhena (cheese curds) kneaded with sugar. A variation called nolen gurher sandesh is made from date molasses instead of sugar.

=== Sel roti ===
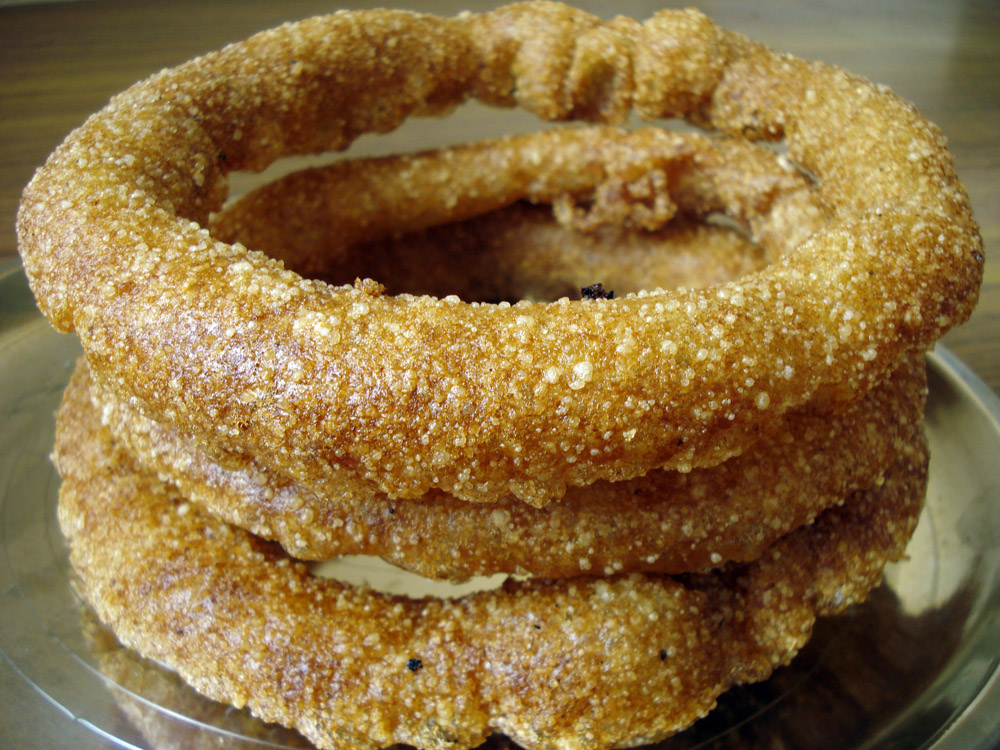
Sel Roti

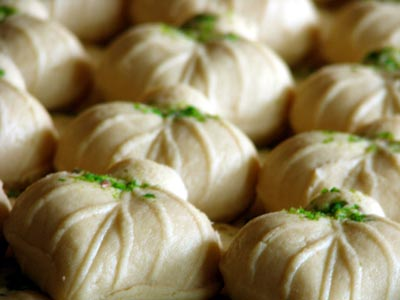
Nollen Sandesh

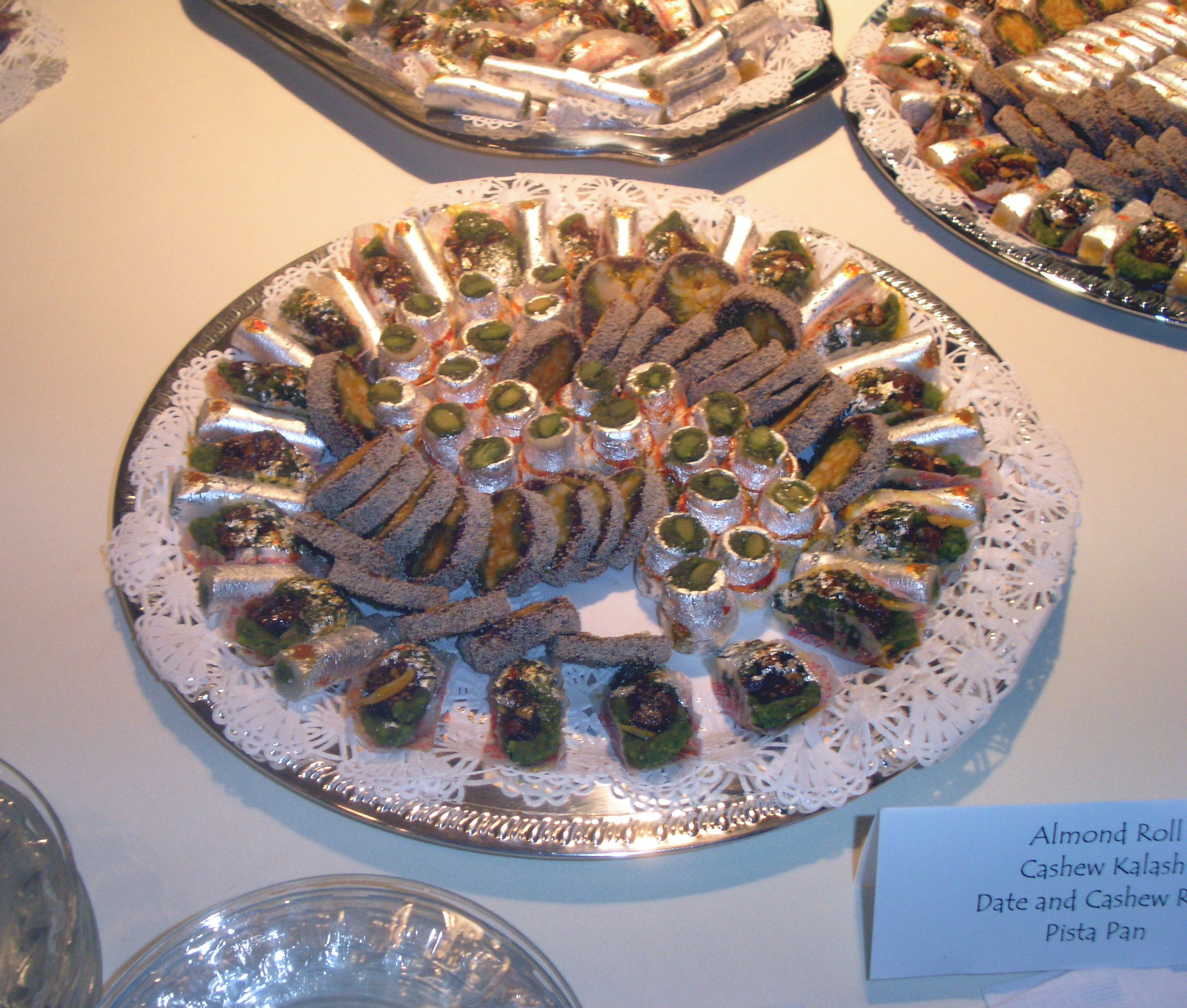
A variety of Indian sweets

Sweets from the Indian subcontinent

Sel roti is a Nepali home-made circular-shaped bread or rice donut that is prepared during Tihar, a widely celebrated Hindu festival in Nepal and India (Sikkim and Darjeeling regions). It is made of rice flour and incorporates customized flavors. A semi liquid rice flour dough is usually prepared by adding together milk, water, sugar, butter, cardamom, cloves as well as other flavors based on personal choice.

=== Shrikhand ===
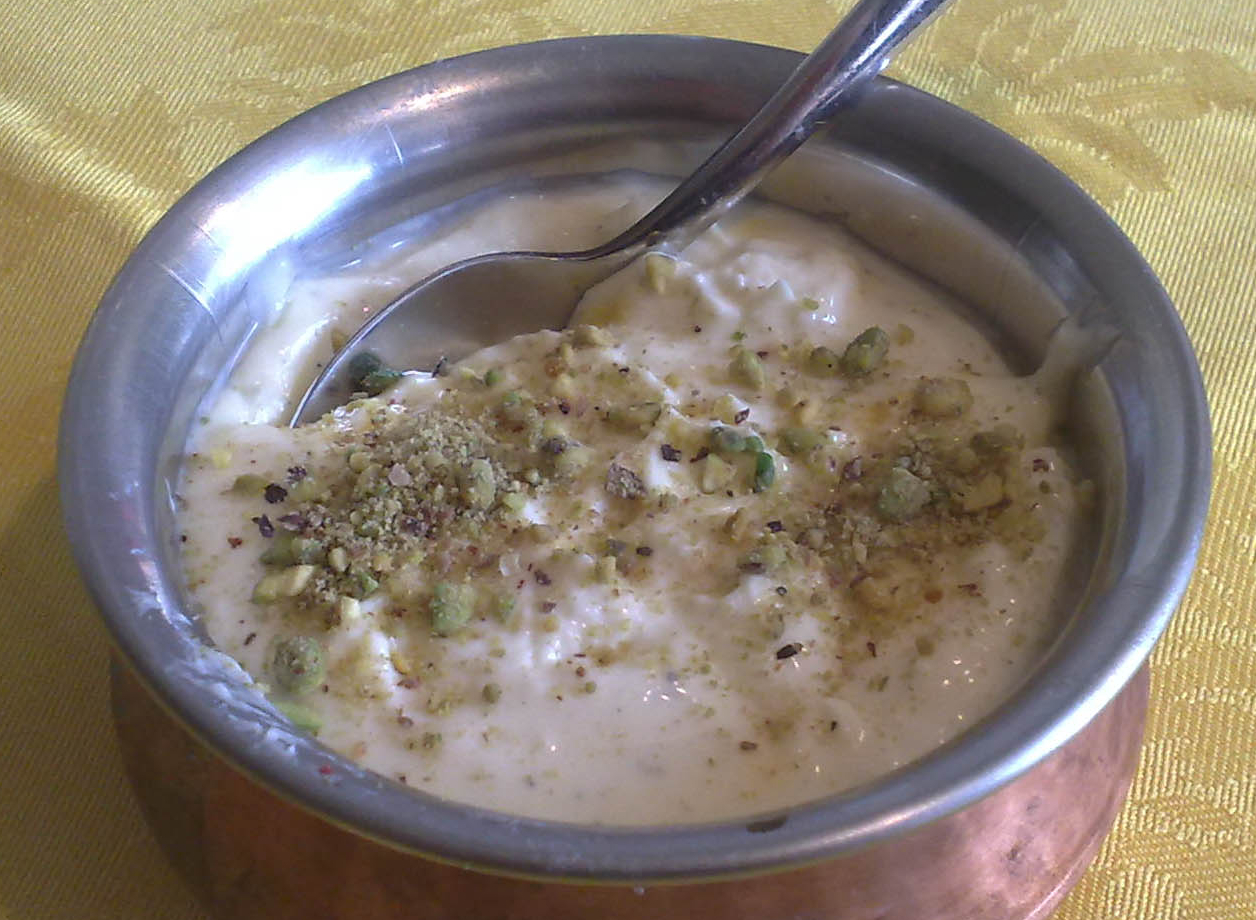
Shrikhand

Shrikhand is a traditional Gujarati and Marathi dessert made from strained yogurt, sugar, saffron, and cardamom. It has a smooth, creamy texture and is served chilled.

=== Soan papdi ===
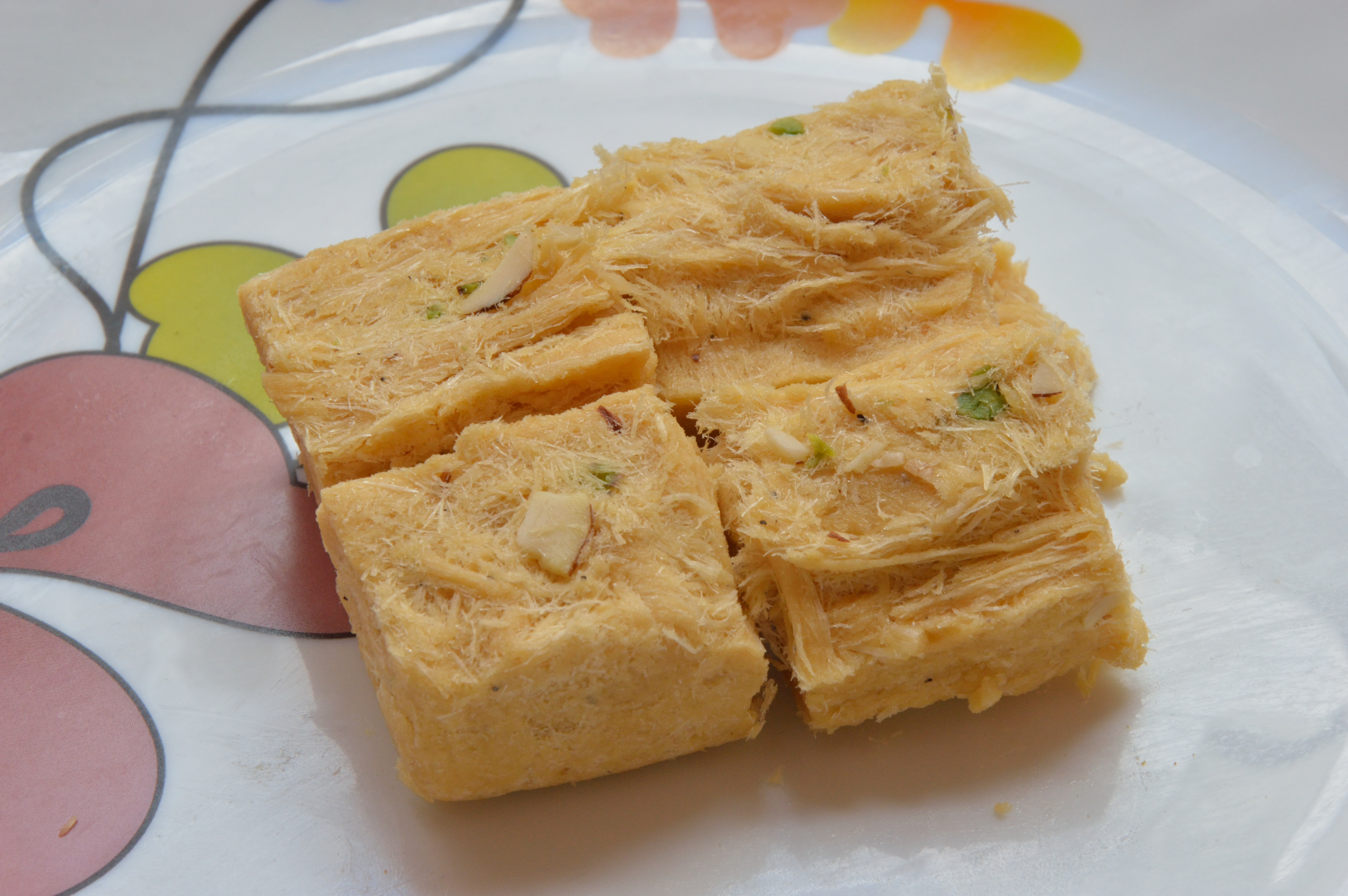
Soan papdi

Soan papdi is a predominantly sugar based sweet that is pulled to create thin strands resembling cotton candy. It is flaky and has a crisp texture and melts in the mouth. It is usually packaged in cubes and served garnished with chopped pistachio nuts, or in a rolled paper cone. There are many different flavorings that can be added, including mango, strawberry, pineapple and chocolate.

=== Tiler Khaja ===
Tiler Khaja is a type of confectionery made from sesame seeds produced in Kushtia District of Bangladesh.

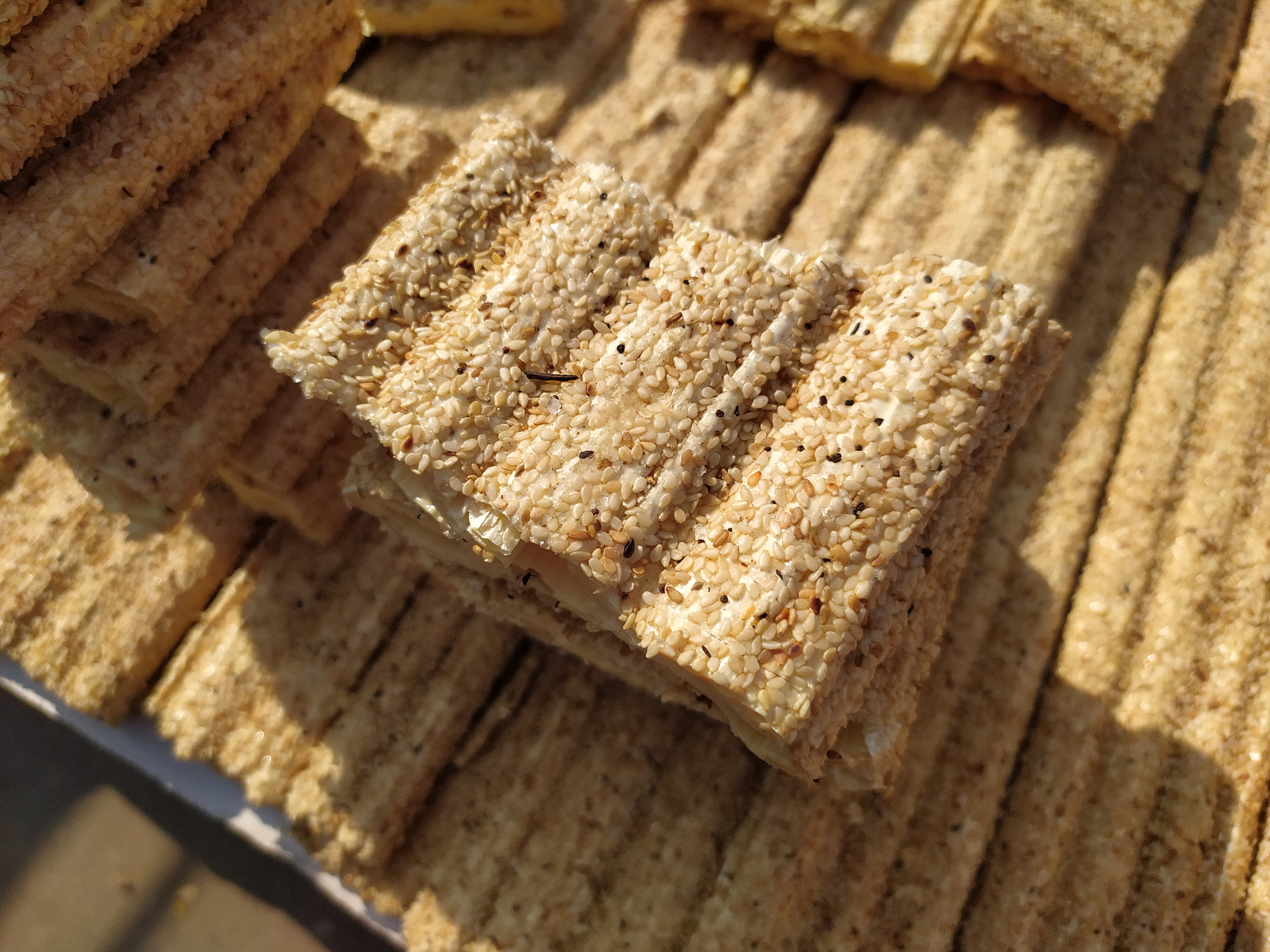
Tiler Khaja

=== Other sweets ===
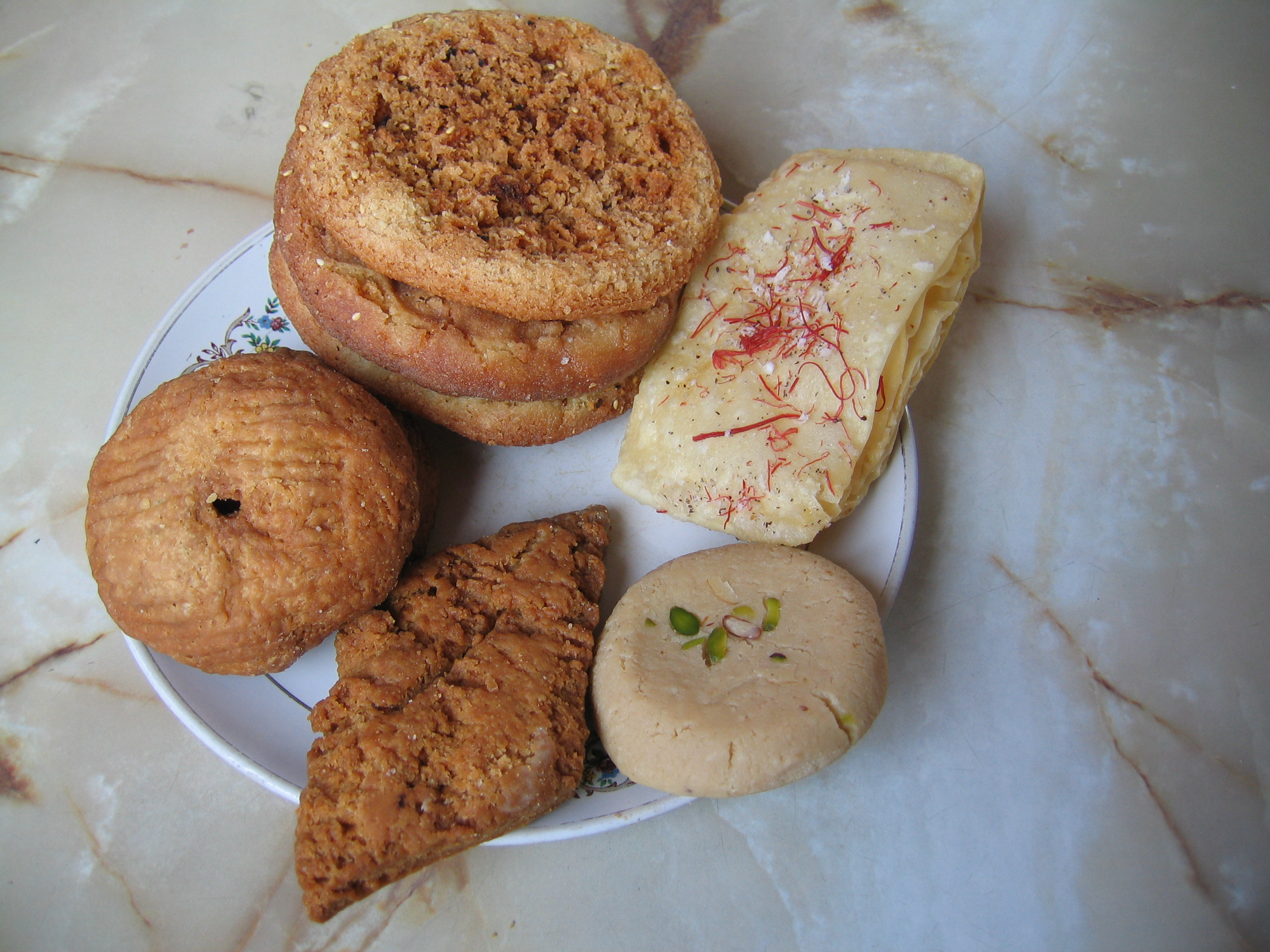
A sample of Newari sweets from Nepal.

Other traditional Indian sweets and desserts famous throughout the history of Indian food include:

- Mysore pak (a dessert made out of ghee, sugar and chick pea flour)
- Halwa (or Halva in modern English spelling); made out of flour, butter and sugar
- Jangiri
- Jhajariya
- Dharwad pedha
- Karadantu

== See also ==
- List of Indian sweets and desserts
- List of Bangladeshi sweets and desserts
- List of desserts
- Bangladeshi cuisine
- Bengali cuisine § Sweets (mishti)
- Indian cuisine
- Cuisine of Karnataka
- Kerala cuisine
- Marathi cuisine
- Oriya cuisine
- Tamil cuisine
