= Big Mishra Pedha =

Indian sweet manufacturer

Big Mishra Pedha Private Limited
- Type: Private
- Industry: Food industry
- Founded: Dharwad, Karnataka 1933
- Founder: Avadhbhihari Mishra
- Headquarters: Hubli, Karnataka, India
- Number of locations: 34+ across Karnataka and Maharastra
- Area served: South India
- Products: Snacks, sweets, beverages, frozen foods, Dharwad pedha
- Production output: Production, processing and preservation of sweets, bread, ice cream, fruits, vegetables, oils and fats
- Owner: The Mishra family, Dharwad
- Divisions: Mishra Big Foods (India) Pvt. Ltd., Mishra Pedha and Foods Pvt. Ltd.
- Website: Official website

Big Mishra Pedha (also known as Mishra Peda) is a manufacturer of Indian sweets and snacks, headquartered in Hubli, Karnataka. Currently there are more than 50 branches in Hubli, and also in Gadag, Davanagere, Shimoga, Pune, Goa, etc.

== Background ==
Avadhbhihari Mishra is the founder of Mishra Pedha. When he moved to Dharwad in 1933, he initially produced pedha on a small scale and later his son, Ganesh Mishra, expanded the business and started producing pedha in Hubli.

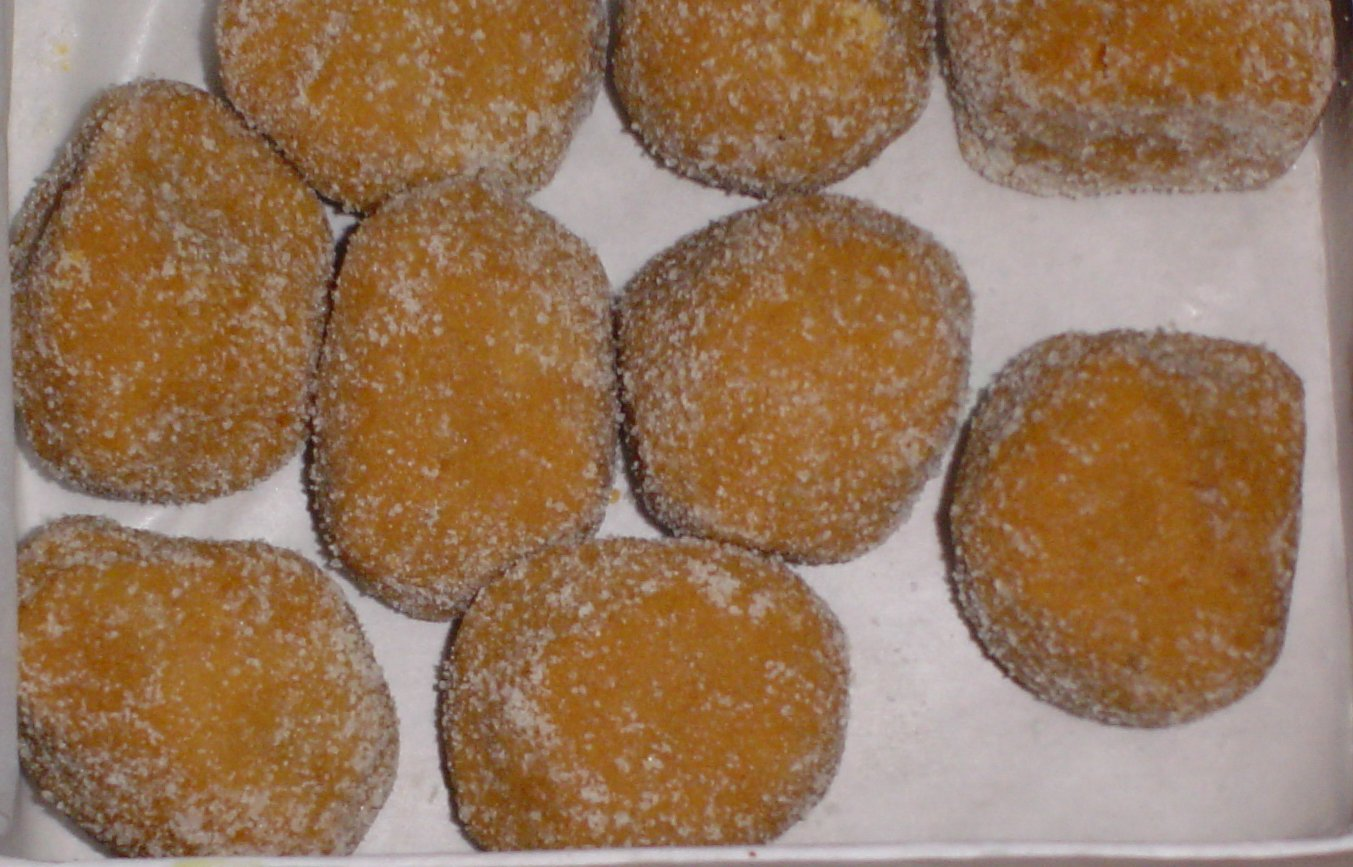
Picture of Dharwad pedha

== See also ==
- List of snack foods from the Indian subcontinent
