= Dharwad pedha =

Indian sweet, often a round ball of dairy solids

Dharwad Pedha
- Geographical indication
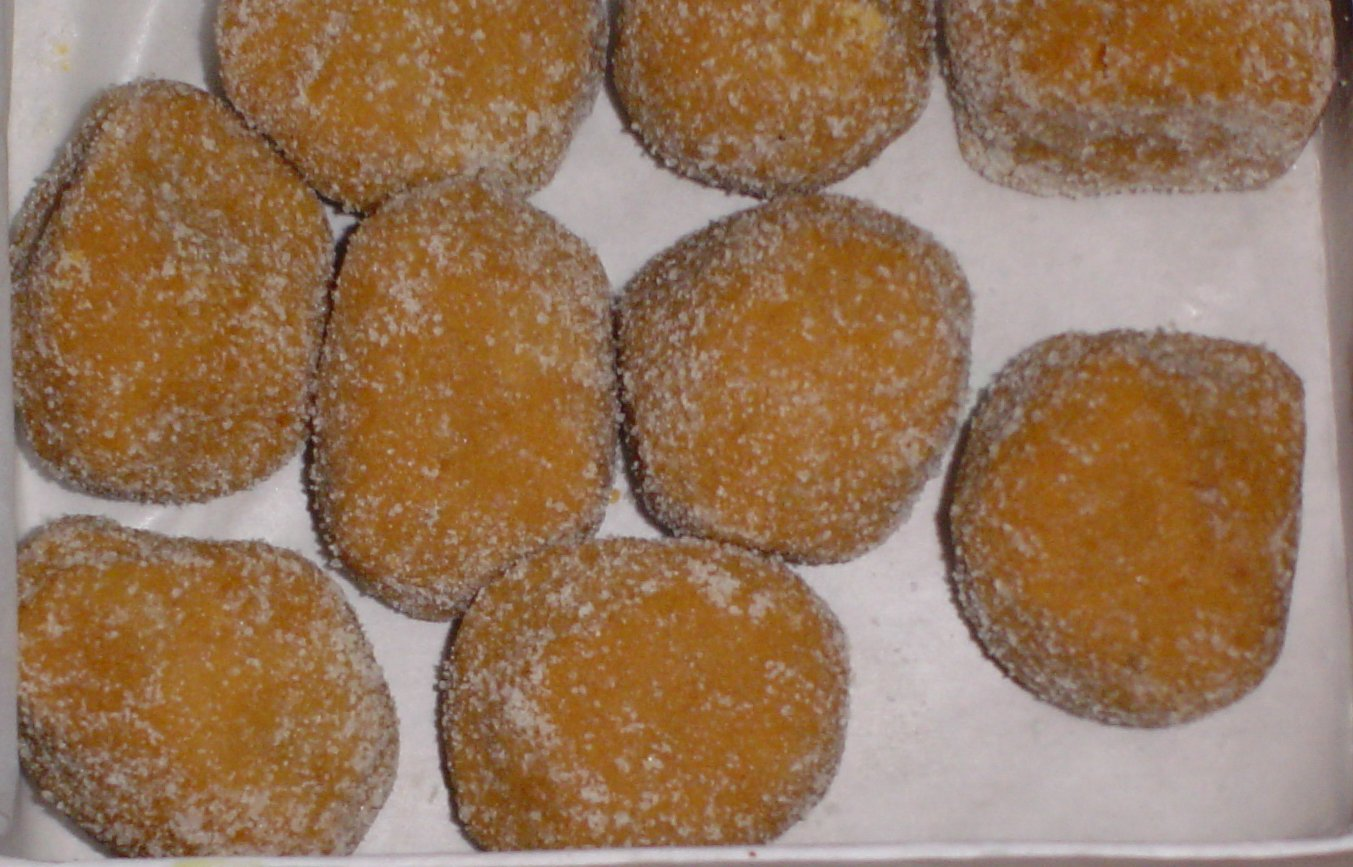
- Alternative names: Dharwad Pedhe
- Type: Dessert
- Area: Dharwad, Karnataka
- Country: India
- Material: Milk, condensed milk, sugar

Dharwad peda (Kannada: ಧಾರವಾಡ ಪೇಡ) is an Indian sweet delicacy unique to the state of Karnataka, India. It derives its name from the city of Dharwad in Karnataka. This sweet's history is around 175 years old. Dharwad peda has been accorded a Geographical Indication tag. Its GI tag number is 80.

== History ==
Dharwad peda was originally started by the Thakur family who had migrated from Unnao in Uttar Pradesh to Dharwad after the plague broke out in Unnao in the late 18th century. Ram Ratan Singh Thakur, a first-generation confectioner, started producing and selling pedas locally. Dharwad peda was prepared from the milk of Dharwadi buffaloes which are raised by the Gavali community in and around Dharwad. His grandson Babu Singh Thakur helped grow the family business further in their Line Bazaar store and the peda came to also be called locally as the "Line Bazaar Peda". Although the recipe came from the Thakur family, it was Big Mishra Pedha who took the sweet to global heights. Big Mishra Pedha is the largest manufacturer of Dharwad Pedha with a capacity to manufacture more than 10 tons of the delicacy everyday operating over 250 stores across Karnataka, Goa, Maharashtra and Telanghana.

== Ingredients ==
The ingredients include milk, sugar and dharwadi buffalo milk.

== Preparation ==
It is made of milk, which is heated and stirred continuously, with added flavor and sugar. As a result, it can be considered a kind of condensed milk with flavors.

== See also ==
- Cuisine of Karnataka
- Big Mishra Pedha Pvt. Ltd.
- Byadagi chilli
- Mattu gulla
- Mysore pak
