= Uttar Pradesh cuisine =

Type of Indian cuisine

Cuisine of Uttar Pradesh is an umbrella term for various regional cuisines within the state of Uttar Pradesh (UP) located in Northern India. As the state of Uttar Pradesh's borders were drawn by the British and in disregard to native regions, "Uttar Pradeshi" cuisine refers to many different cultural regions with their own unique cuisines. They are Brajwasi, Mughlai, Awadhi, Kannuaji, Kauravi, Bundeli, Bagheli and Bhojpuri. The cuisines of UP are very diverse, and consist of both vegetarian and non-vegetarian dishes, with the Brajwasi cuisine being more vegetarian like its Rajasthani and Haryanvi neighbors. Being a large state, the various cuisines of UP share many dishes and recipes with the neighboring states of Delhi, Rajasthan, Uttarakhand, Bihar, Jharkhand and Haryana.

== Bread ==
As wheat is the staple food of the state, breads are very significant. Breads are generally flat breads; only a few varieties are raised breads. The breads may be made of different types of flour and can be made in various ways. Popular breads include tandoori naan (naan baked in a tandoor), tandoori roti, kulcha, taftan, sheermal, rumali roti, poori, paratha, millet (millet flour flatbread), litti (Especially in Bhojpuri), kachori, parantha, chapathi. As one goes more east in the state and leaves the semi-arid parts of Braj, rice becomes more and more common.

== Common food ==
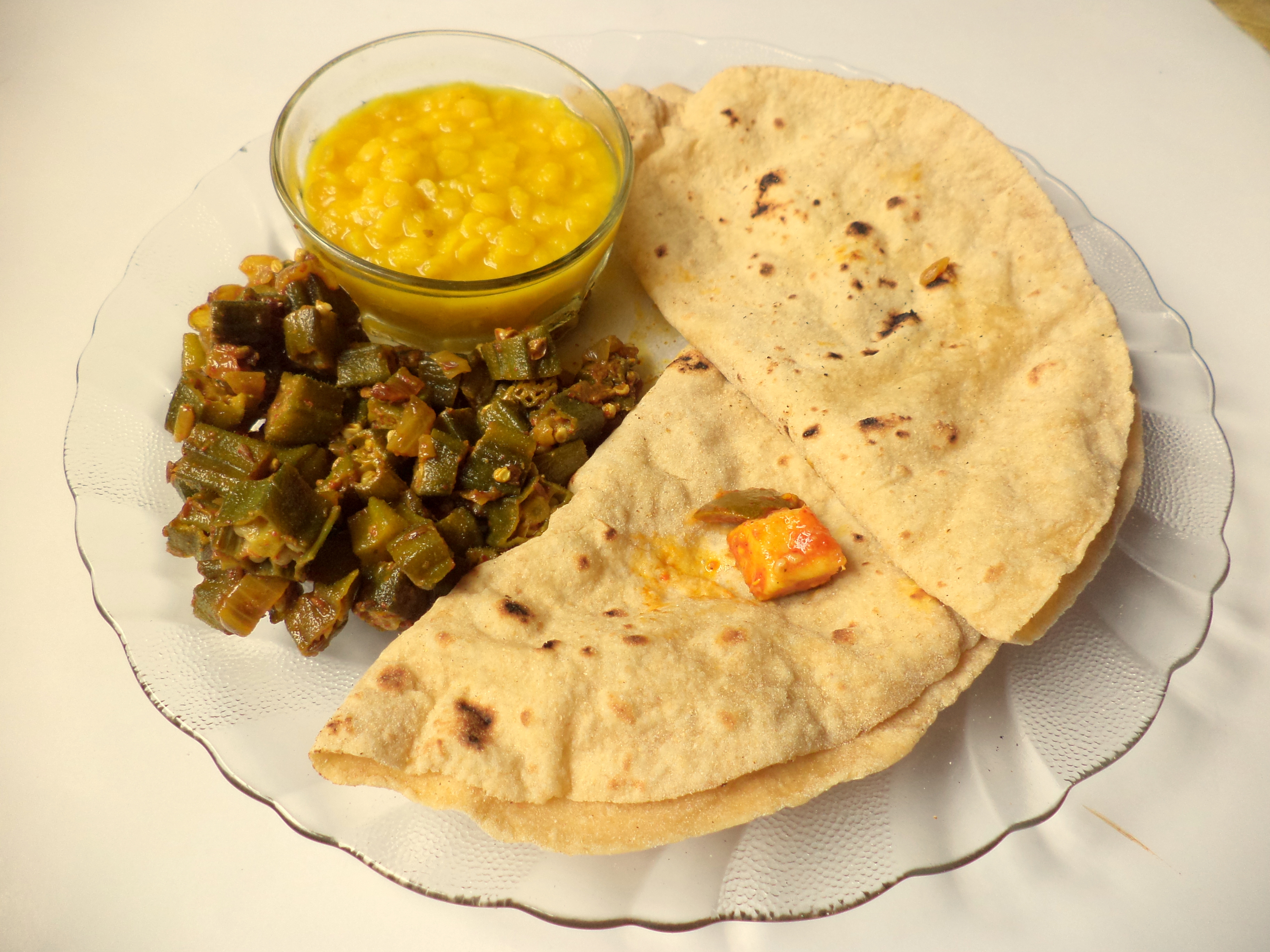
A staple meal from UP, consisting of sabji, daal and rotis with mango pickle.

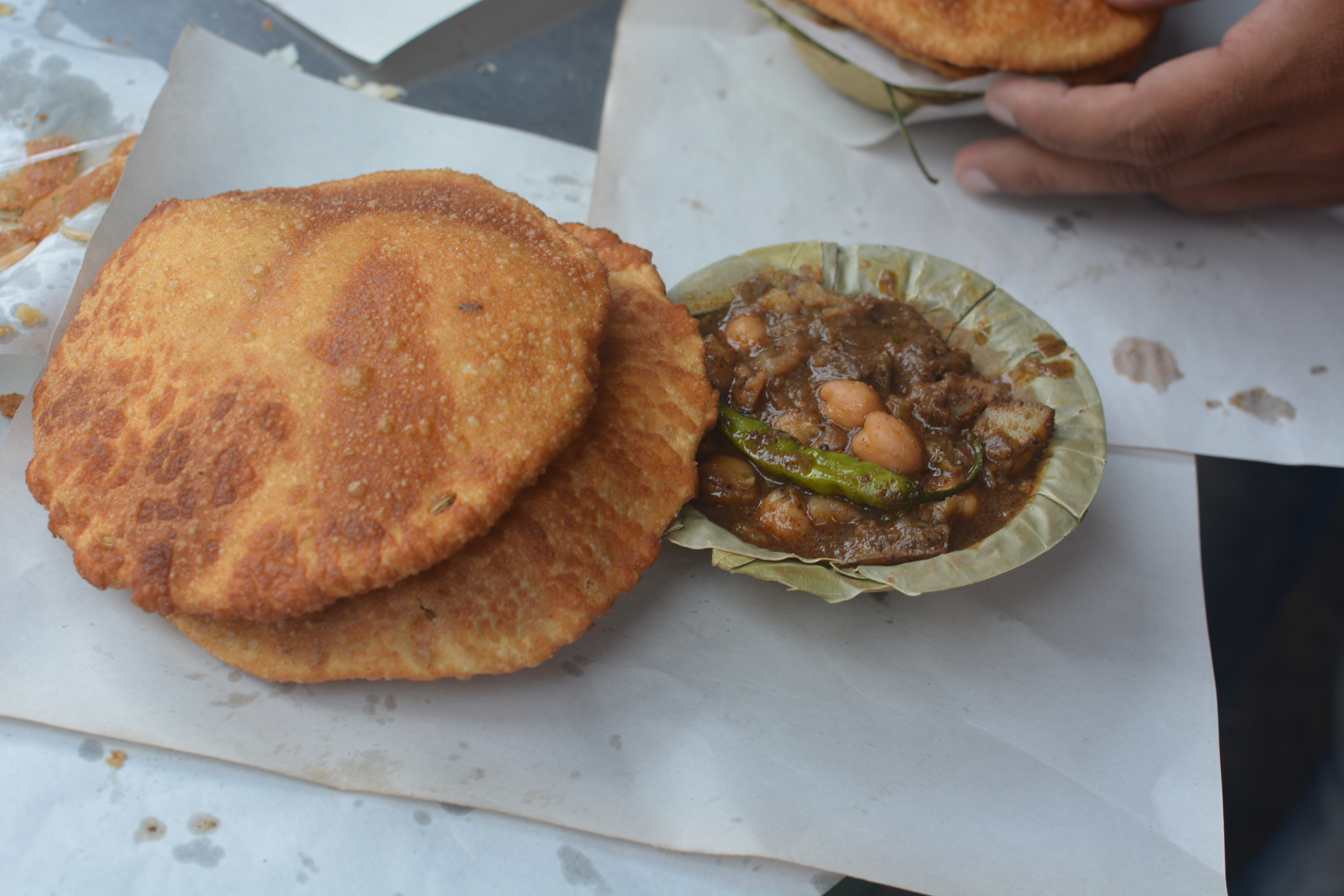
Kachori sabji is a popular breakfast in Uttar Pradesh.

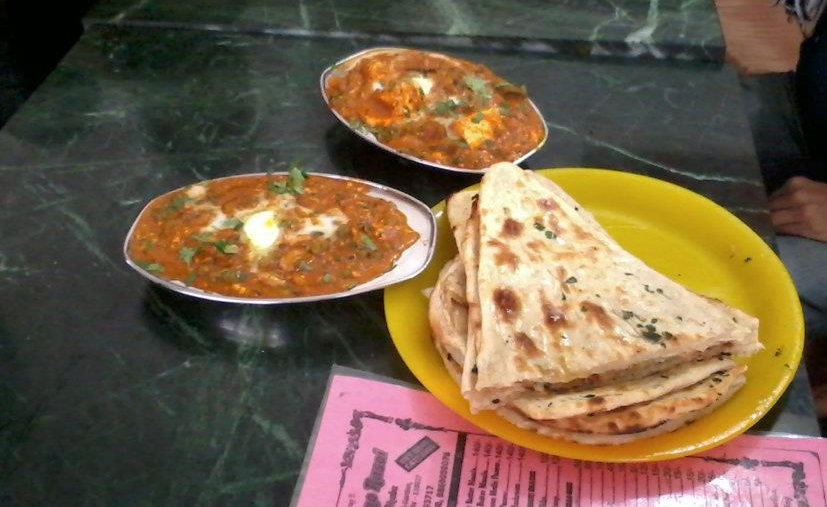
Shahi paneer and bread.

- Biryani
- Boondi
- Chaat
- Dum bhindi (fried whole okra stuffed with spiced potato filling)
- Egg curry
- Kofta
- Korma
- Aloo gosht
- Litti chokha
- Mutton biryani
- Nihari
- Pakora
- Palak paneer
- Pasanda kabab (skewered boneless mutton)
- Pasanda paneer (similar to paneer makhani)
- Poori
- Raita
- Rajma
- Chole (chickpea curry)
- Chana masala
- Samosa
- Shab deg (a winter dish, turnips and mutton balls with saffron)
- Kalmi kebab
- Shami kabab (includes tangy green mango)
- Sohan halwa especially in Rampur state
- Petha (known as bhatuapaag in Bhojpuri areas)
- Tehri (vegetarian rice dish with spices and mixed vegetables)
- Daal
- Kichdi

== Traditional desserts ==
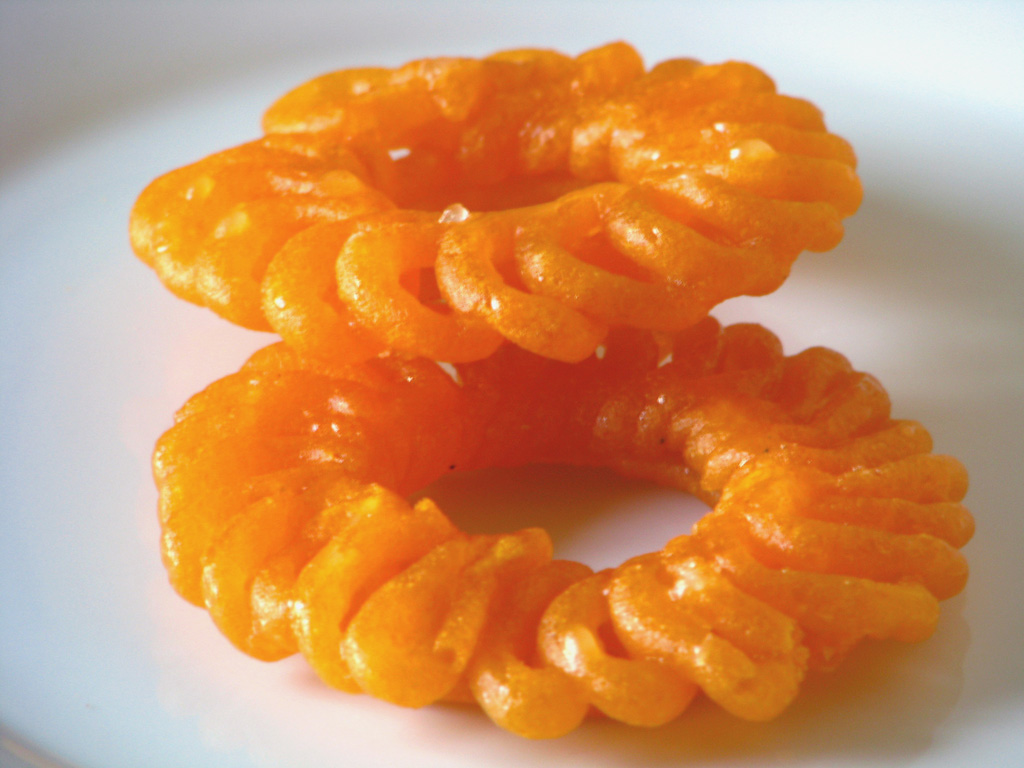
Imarti, made from lentil dough.

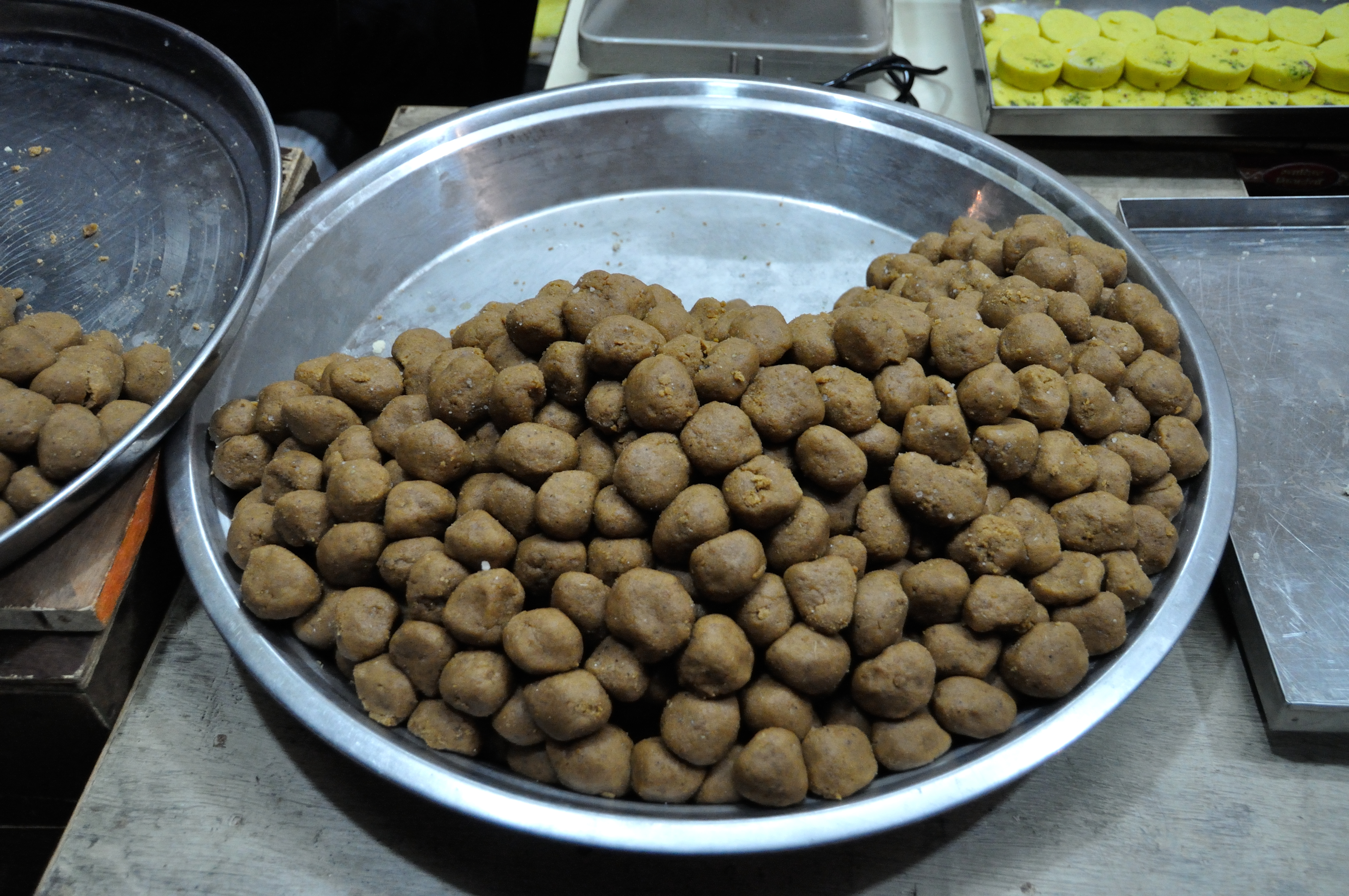
Pedas from Mathura Vrindavan.

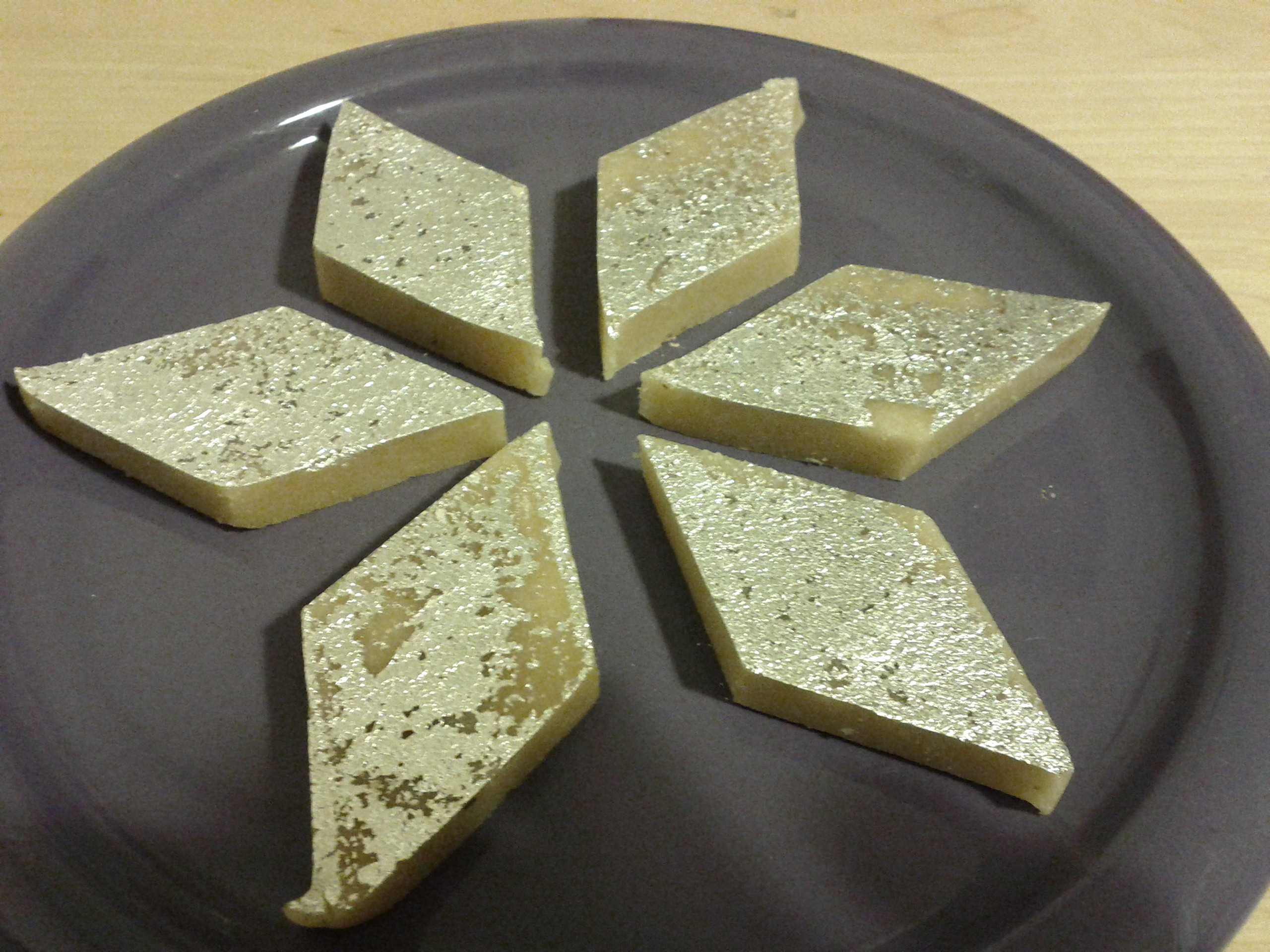
Kaju katli

- Balushahi
- Barfi
- Chhena
- Gajar ka halwa
- Ghevar
- Gujia
- Gulab jamun
- Halwa
- Imarti
- Jalebi
- Kaju katli
- Kalakand
- Kheer
- Kulfi
- Laddu
- Nankhatai
- Shahi tukda
- Malpua
- Peda
- Petha
- Rabri
- Ras malai
- Sheer khorma
- Thekua

== Common beverages ==
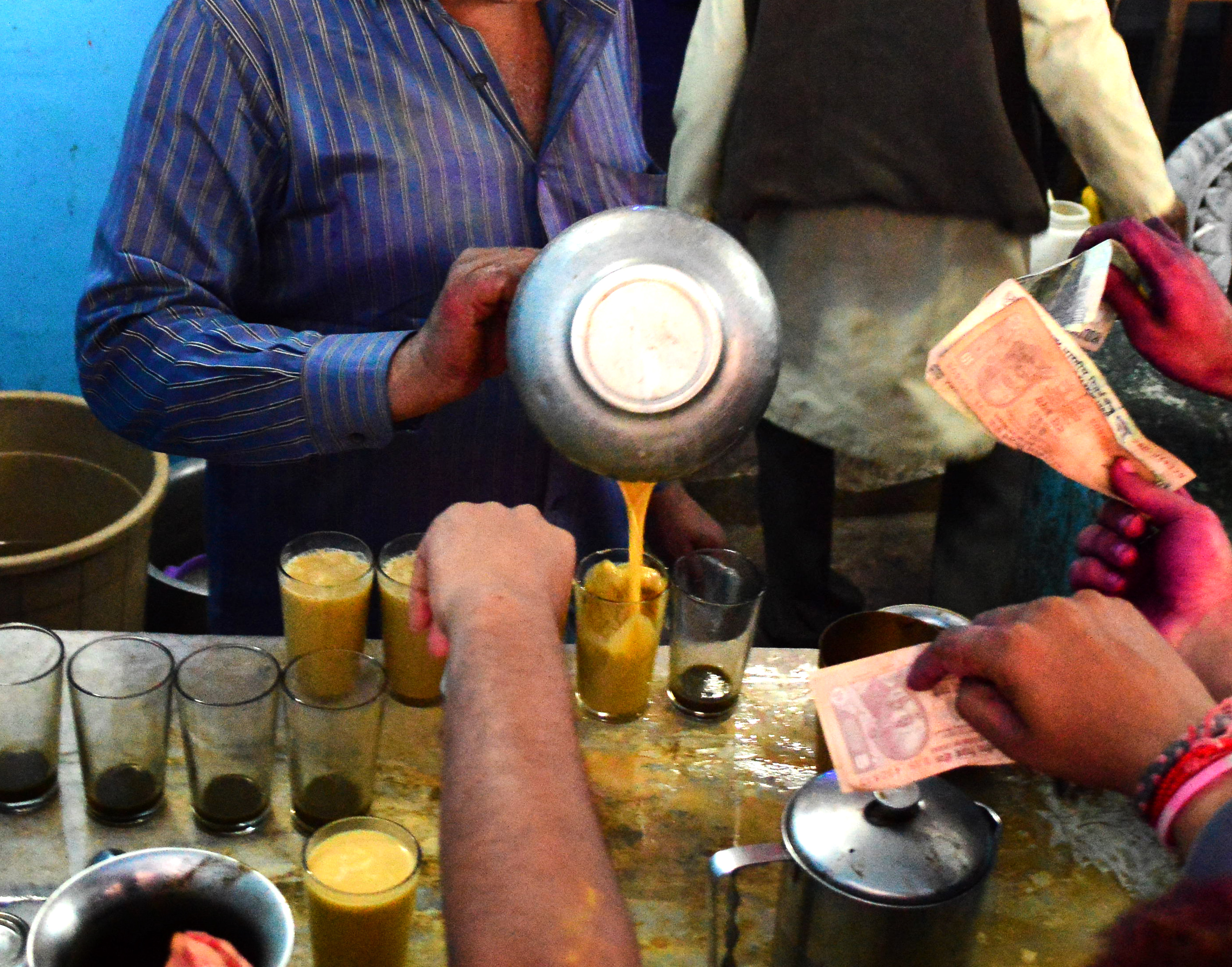
A stall selling thandai, a popular milk-based cold drink from UP.

- Falooda
- Chhaas
- Lassi
- Raita
- Sharbat
- Thandai

== See also ==
- Indian cuisine
- North Indian cuisine
- Awadhi cuisine
- Bhojpuri cuisine
- Mughlai cuisine
