= List of Indian sweets and desserts =

This is a list of Indian sweets and desserts, also called mithai, a significant element in Indian cuisine. Indians are known for their unique taste and experimental behavior when it comes to food. Many Indian desserts are fried foods made with sugar, milk or condensed milk. Ingredients and preferred types of dessert vary by region. In the eastern part of India, for example, most are based on milk products. Many are flavoured with almonds and pistachios; spiced with cardamon, nutmeg, cloves and black pepper; and decorated with nuts, or with gold or silver leaf.

== North ==
Name	Image	Main ingredients	Category
Arisa Pitha		Rice flour, Jaggery	Fried, jaggery based
Bal mithai		Khoya, cane sugar, caramelised sugar syrup	Khoya fudge
Boondi		Gram flour (besan), ghee, sugar.	Sugar syrup based
Falooda		Vermicelli, Rose syrup, Milk, Kulfi, Basil seeds, fruit jelly	Cold dessert/ beverage
Gajar Pak		Carrots, milk, sugar, ghee, cashews and raisins.	Halva
Ghevar		Flour, ghee, kewra, milk, clarified butter, sugar, almonds, pistachio, saffron, green cardamom.	Fried, sugar syrup based
Gulab jamun		Fried milk balls soaked in sweet syrup, such as rose syrup or honey.	Fried, sugar syrup based
Imarti		Sugar syrup, lentil flour.	Fried, sugar syrup based
Jalebi		Dough fried in a coil shape dipped in sugar syrup, often taken with milk, tea, yogurt, or lassi.	Fried, sugar syrup based
Kaju katli		Cashews, ghee with cardamom and sugar.	Barfi
Kalakand		Milk, cottage cheese.	Burfi
Kheer		A rice pudding made with milk, rice, sugar and dried fruits	Pudding
Khirmohan		Chhena, sugar, semolina, water.	Sugar syrup based
Kulfi		An ice cream made with milk and sugar, with a variety of flavours such as mango, saffron, or cardamom.	Ice cream
Laddu		Gram flour (besan), ghee, sugar.	Laddu
Lassi		Yogurt, milk, nuts, can be made with mango.	Yogurt drink
Motichoor laddu		Besan flour, sugar.	Laddu
Makhan Bada		Maida flour, yogurt, oil, sugar.	Sugar syrup based
Malpua		Wheat or rice flour.	Fried, sugar syrup based
Nankhatai	Nankhatai, an Indian sweet	Refined flour, besan, ghee, powdered sugar, yogurt green cardamom seeds.	Baked
Petha		Firm white pumpkin, sugar, kitchen lime, alum powder.	Sugar syrup based
Phirni		Rice, sugar, nuts.	Pudding
Rabri		Boiled condensed milk, sugar, spices and nuts.	Pudding
Sheera		Semolina, ghee, nuts, milk.	Pudding
Singori		Khoa, coconut, molu leaf.	Milk-based
Sohan halwa		Corn flour, ghee, dry fruits.	Halva
Soan papdi / Pateesa		Besan flour.	Barfi
Makuti		Moong Dal, milk	Pudding

== East ==
Name	Image	Main ingredients	Category
Amriti		Deep fried vigna mungo, sugar syrup.	Fried, sugar syrup based
Chak-Hao kheer		Black rice, milk, sugar	Milk-based
Cham cham		chhena, Flour, cream, sugar, saffron, lemon juice, coconut flakes.	Milk-based
Chandrapuli		Khoa, sugar, ghee, coconut flakes.	Coconut and milk based
Chhena gaja		Chhena, sugar, ghee.	Milk-based
Chhena jalebi		Chhena, sugar, ghee.	Milk-based
Chhena Jhili	chenna jhilli	whole milk, refined flour, powdered sugar, cardamom, oil/ghee for deep frying	Milk based
Chhena kheeri		Chhena, sugar, milk.	Milk-based
Chhena poda		Sugar, chenna cheese.	Milk-based
Chuda Ghasa		Rice Flakes (Poha), Sugar powder or Jaggery, Desi Ghee, Grated fresh Coconut, Pepper Powder, big cardamon powder, Dry fruits Optional	Flatten rice/rice flakes, sugar/jaggery, ghee based
Coconut Barfi		Made from coconut, fine ground sugar, ghee, cardamom powder and milk.	Coconut and milk based
Jaynagarer Moa		gur, cow ghee, Kanakchur khoi	Fried and Rice-based
Jolbhora Sandesh		chhena, sugar, date palm jaggery syrup	Milk based and filled with date palm jaggery syrup
Kheer sagar		Chenna, condensed milk, sugar, saffron, cardamom.	Milk-based
Kolar Bora		banana, coconut, maida, sugar, oil	Fried and Banana-based
Labanga latika		maida, khoa, nutmeg (powdered), grated coconut, ghee, nuts, raisins, cardamom, cloves and sugar	Fried and sugar-syrup based
Ledikeni		Chhena, sugar, ghee.	Milk-based
Lyangcha		Flour, fried milk powder, sugar syrup.	Milk-based
Malpua		Yogurt, refined flour, ghee, fennel seeds.	Milk-based
Mihidana		Besan flour, sugar, ghee.	Fried, sugar syrup based
Mishti doi		Yogurt, jaggery.	Milk-based
Pantua		Chhena, sugar, ghee	Milk-based
Pitha		Rice flour.	Milk-based
Puri Khaja		Refined flour (maida), pure ghee, sugar, refined cooking oil for frying (Pure ghee may also be used for frying) Salt to taste	Ghee and refined flour-based
Rabri		Sweetened milk.	Milk-based
Rasabali		Chenna, sweetened milk.	Milk-based
Ras malai		Chhena, reduced milk, pistachio	Milk-based
Rasgulla		Chhena, sugar	Milk-based
Sandesh		Made from cheese, kneaded with fine ground sugar and molasses.	Milk-based
Sarpuria		cream, sugar, maida, gheecardamom powder	Fried and Milk-based
Sirir naru		jaggery and gram flour, mustard oil for deep fry	Jaggery based
Sarbhaja		sugar, cream, ghee, maida	Fried, milk and sugar syrup-based
Sitabhog		Chhena, rice flour, sugar, vermicelli/rice	Fried, rice, and sugar-syrup based
Taal-er bora		Sugar palm pulp, rice flour, sugar, oil, and cardamom.	Fried, fruit-based

== South ==
Name	Image	Main ingredients	Category
Ada		Rice flour, grated coconut, jaggery or sugar	
Ada pradhaman		Rice Ada, coconut milk, jaggery, nuts, raisins, cardamom	
Adhirasam / Khajjaya / Ariselu		Rice flour, jaggery, ghee, vegetable oil, elachi	
Arcot Makkan Peda		Khoa, Maida, Sugar, cardamon powder, stuffed with nuts	Similar to Gulab Jamun but stuffed with nuts. Famous in Arcot, Tamil Nadu
Bandar laddu		Besan, jaggery, cardamom powder, ghee, cashews and raisins, jaggery syrup, sugar	Laddu, popular in Machilipatanam, Andhra Pradesh
Boorelu		Chana dal, jaggery	
Kovilpatti Kadalai Mittai		Nuts (usually peanuts), jaggery	
Dharwad Pedha		Milk, Sugar, Dharwadi buffalo milk	Burfi
Double ka Meetha		Loaf bread, milk	
Gavvalu		Rice flour	
Jaangiri		Black gram	Fry syrup based
Kakinada Kaja		Wheat flour, sugar	
Kozhukkattai		Rice flour, Ground Nut, Jaggery, grated coconut	Similar to Modak in Tamil Nadu
Neyyappam		Ghee, Rice flour, Jaggery, coconut	
Kuzhi paniyaram		Black lentils and rice	
Mysore Pak		Besan flour, sugar, ghee	Burfi
Obbattu / Holige / Bobbatlu / Pappu Polelu / Boli		Maida flour, Coconut or Channa Dal/Toor Dal, Jaggery	Bread
Srivilliputtur Palkova		Milk, Sugar	Famous in Srivilliputhur, Tamil Nadu
Ashoka Halwa		Moong Dal, Wheat flour, sugar	Well known in Thiruvaiyaru, Tamil Nadu
Palathalikalu		Rice flour, milk	
Sakkarai Pongal		rice, jaggery, cashews, ghee	
Pootharekulu		Rice flour, powdered sugar/ghee	
Tirunelveli Halwa		wheat flour, sugar, ghee, nuts, cardamom	A famous sweet in Tamil Nadu .
Khubani ka meetha		Apricots, sugar syrup	
Kesari bat		Rava (semolina, ghee, sugar)	
Sheer khurma		Vermicelli, pudding, milk	
Unni Appam		Rice flour, banana, jaggery, coconut	
Kajjikayalu		Rice flour, jaggery, coconut	

== West ==
Name	Image	Main ingredients	Category
Aamras		Mango, milk	
Anarsa		Slightly fermented rice flour, jaggery, khus-khus seeds	
Basundi		Sugar, milk	
Bebinca		Flour, sugar, ghee, egg yolk, coconut milk	Baked layered Christmas sweet
Dhondas		Cucumber, rava	Baked cake
Doodhpak		Milk, rice, sugar, dry fruits	Milk-based
Kaju katli		Cashews, ghee	
Mahim halwa		Semolina, sugar	
Modak		Rice flour, coconut jaggery stuffing	Fried
Mohanthal		Besan, ghee, sugar and nuts	
Patoleo		Rice flour, coconut jaggery and grated coconut stuffing	Wrapped in turmeric leaves and steamed
Puran poli		Wheat flour, gram, jaggery	Bread
Shankarpali		Sugar, ghee, maida flour, semolina	
Shrikhand		A creamy dessert made out of strained yogurt, often served with dried fruits such as mangoes.	Yogurt-based
Sutar feni		Maida, sugar, ghee	

== Pan-Indian ==
Name	Image	Main ingredients	Category
Barfi		Milk Powder	Barfi
Halva		Corn Flour	Boiled
Kheer/Ksheerannam/Payesh/Payasam/Doodh Pheni/Meetha Bhat		Milk, sugar, nuts, and rice, vermicelli, or tapioca pearls	Milk-based, called Payasam in Southern parts of the country
Laddoo		Milk, flour	Laddu
Peda		Milk (khoya), sugar, saffron	Milk-based
Jalebi		Dough fried in a coil shape dipped in sugar syrup, often taken with milk, tea, yogurt, or lassi.	Fried, sugar syrup based
Gulab jamun		Fried milk balls soaked in sweet syrup, such as rose syrup or honey.	Fried, sugar syrup based

== See also ==
- List of Indian snack foods
- List of pastries
