= Bombay Sweets =

Indian sweet maker

- Industry: Restaurant
- Genre: Traditional South Indian sweets and savouries
- Founded: Since 1949 Thanjavur, Tamil Nadu, India
- Founder: Gurudayal Sharma
- Headquarters: Thanjavur, Tamil Nadu, India
- Number of locations: 12
- Area served: India
- Products: Food, sweets, savouries, condiments

Bombay Sweets is an Indian sweet manufacturer and eatery based in Thanjavur, Tamil Nadu. It is most noted for its Dry Gulabjamoon, Chandra Kala & Surya Kala.

== History ==
Bombay Sweets was established in 1949 in Thanjavur in South Indian state of Tamil Nadu. Its founder was Gurudayal Sharma who wanted to produce Dry Gulabjamoon, Chandra Kala & Surya Kala in 1950 when Tamil Nadu was only familiar with Mysorepak, Halwa, Laddu, Badusha & Jangiri.
