= Kaju katli =

Indian dessert

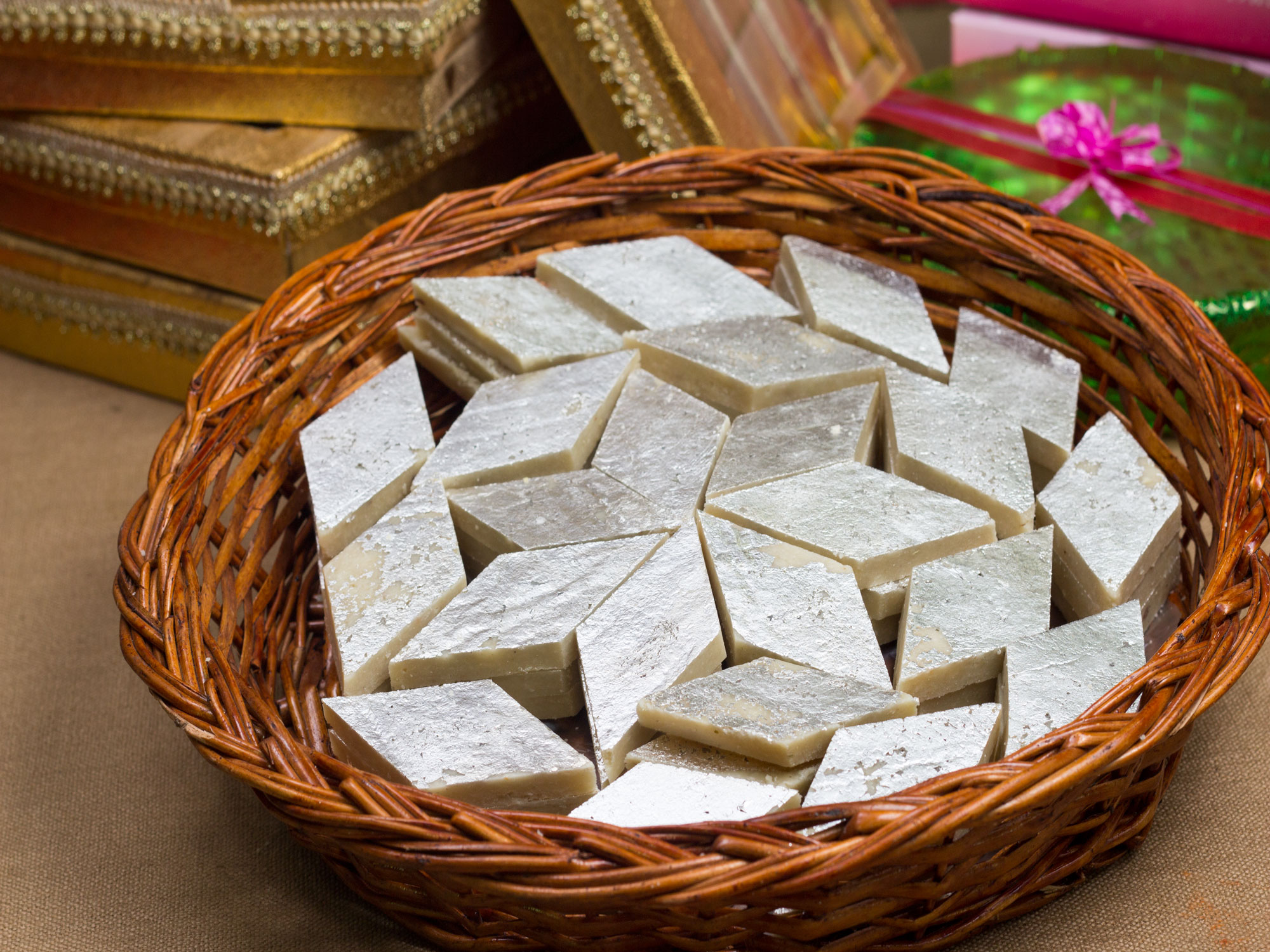
- Kaju katli
- Alternative names: Kaju katri, Kaju barfi
- Course: Dessert
- Place of origin: India
- Associated cuisine: Indian
- Main ingredients: Cashews, sugar, ghee
- Variations: Kesar peda, barfi, pista barfi
- Food energy (per serving): 41 kcal (170 kJ)

Kaju katli (lit. 'Cashew slice') is an Indian dessert. Kaju means cashew. It is similar to barfi, which is often made by thickening milk with sugar and other ingredients (such as dry fruits and mild spices), but unlike barfi it typically contains no milk.

The dish is prepared with cashews soaked in water for a considerable period of time (usually overnight), which are then ground to a paste. Sugar solution is boiled down until a single thread forms when two fingers are dipped into it and pulled apart, after which it is added to the ground cashews. Ghee, saffron (kesar), and dried fruits may also be added; if made with saffron it is called kesar kaju katli. The paste is then spread and flattened in a shallow, flat-bottomed dish and cut into bite-sized rhombus-shaped pieces. The pieces are usually decorated with edible silver foil. The finished sweet is usually white or yellow in color depending on the ingredients used for the paste and the proportions of each used. Kaju katli is traditionally eaten during the Hindu festival of Diwali.
