= Sweet shells =

Indian foodstuff

Gavvalu
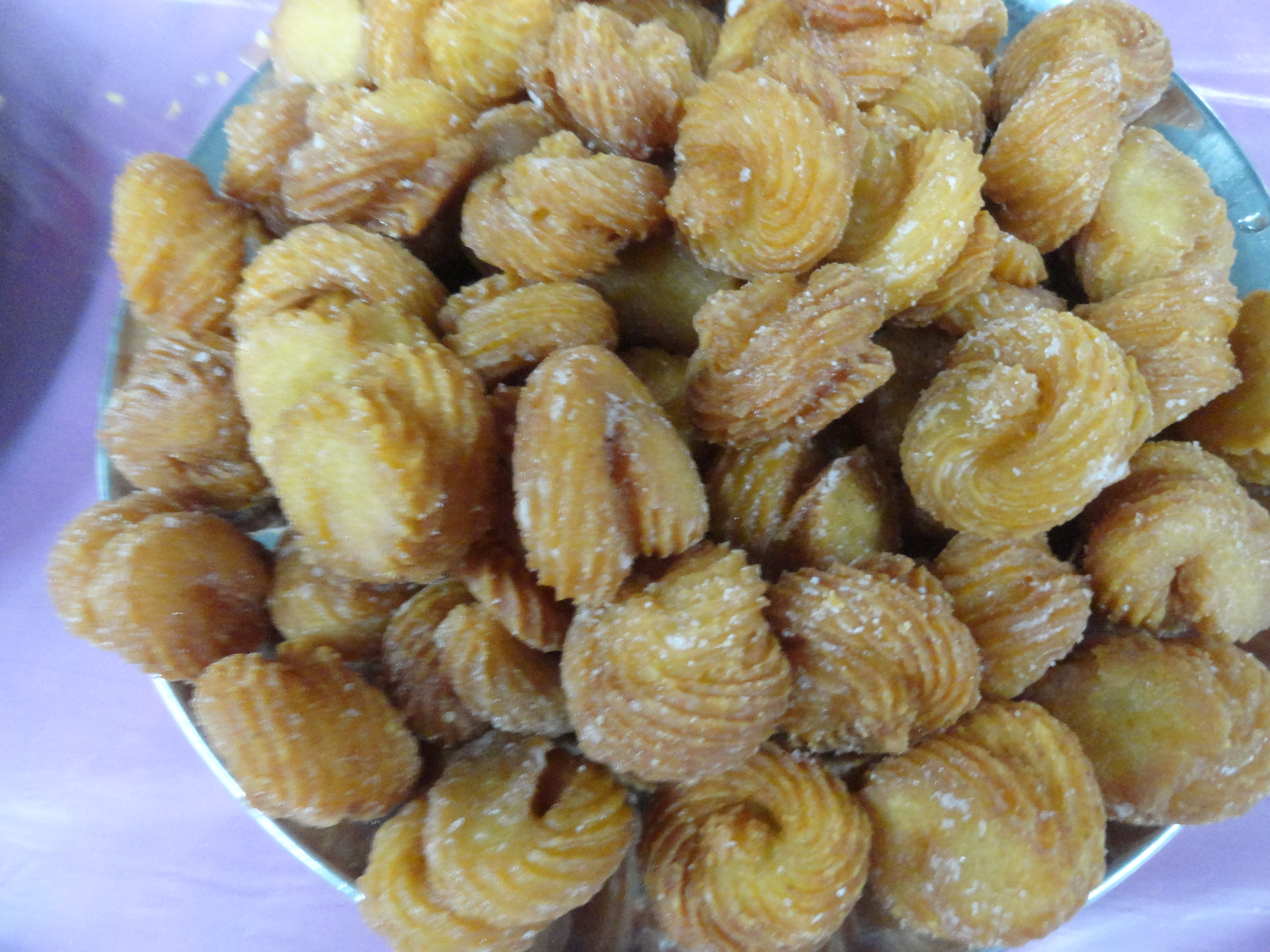
- Course: Dessert
- Place of origin: India
- Region or state: Andhra Pradesh
- Main ingredients: Maida, water or milk

Sweet shells or gavvalu (Telugu: గవ్వలు, gavvalu) is one of the typical Indian sweets made in Andhra Pradesh, India. It is a mixture (dough) of maida and water or milk. The prepared dough is shaped into small rounds, which are flattened and rolled (on a special tool) so as to take the shape of gavvalu (cowrie shells). These shells are fried in oil or ghee and soaked in sugar or jaggery syrup.

== See also ==
- Kidyo
