= Puran poli =

Indian sweet dish consisting of sweetened flatbread

Puranpoli
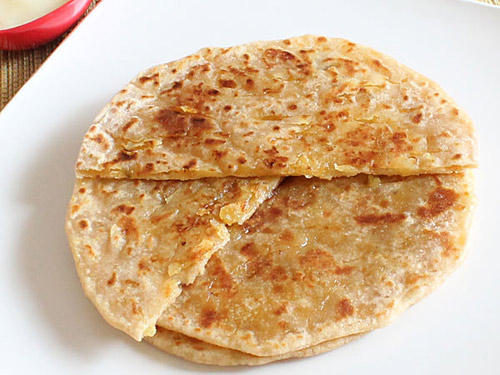
- Alternative names: Bobbattu, obbattu, holige, ubbatti, vedmi, poli, puranachi poli, god poli, boli, pappu bakshalu, bakshalu, oliga, abatulu.
- Place of origin: India
- Region or state: Karnataka, Maharashtra, Andhra Pradesh, Gujarat, Goa, Telangana, Kerala and Tamil Nadu
- Serving temperature: Hot or Cold
- Main ingredients: Wheat flour or maida flour, sugar, chana dal, ghee, jaggery

Puran poli (IPA: [puɾəɳ poɭiː]) is an Indian sweet flatbread that is popular in South India and mainly in the state of Maharashtra. It is also known as puran puri, holige, obbattu, bobbatlu, poley, bakshamulu, and boli.

== Names ==
The various names for the flatbread include puran puri (પુરણ પુરી) or vedmi (વેડમી) in Gujarati, bobbatlu or baksham or oliga in Telugu, Andhra Pradesh. In Kannada holige (ಹೋಳಿಗೆ) (mainly in North Karnataka) and obbattu (ಒಬ್ಬಟ್ಟು) (in South Karnataka), puran poli (पुरण पोळी) in Marathi, payasaboli or simply boli (ബോളി) in Malayalam, Boli “போளி” in Tamil, bhakshalu or pole or polae in Telugu, Telangana and ubbatti or simply poli in Konkani.

== History ==
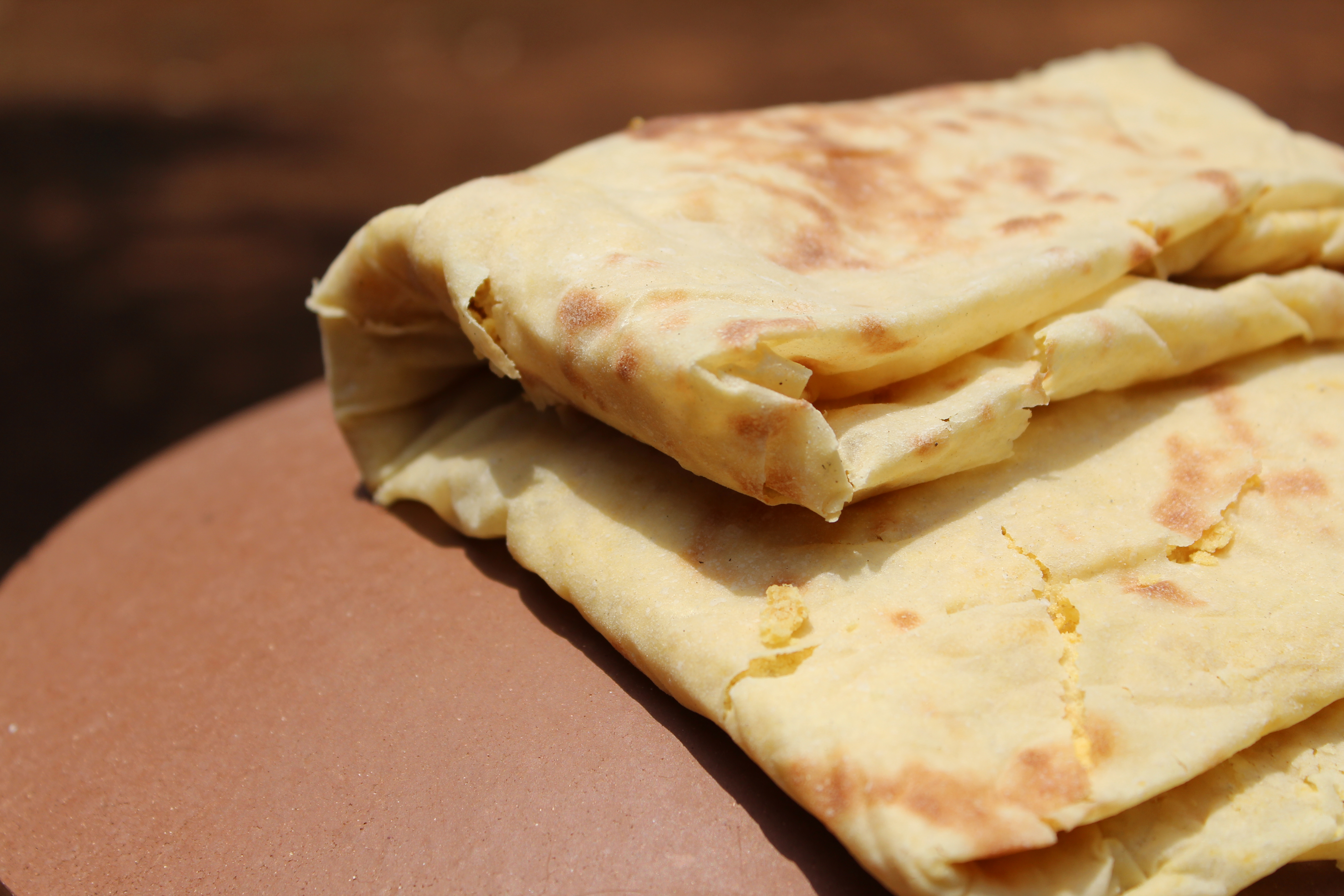
A Khapravarachi Puran Poli from Maharashtra.

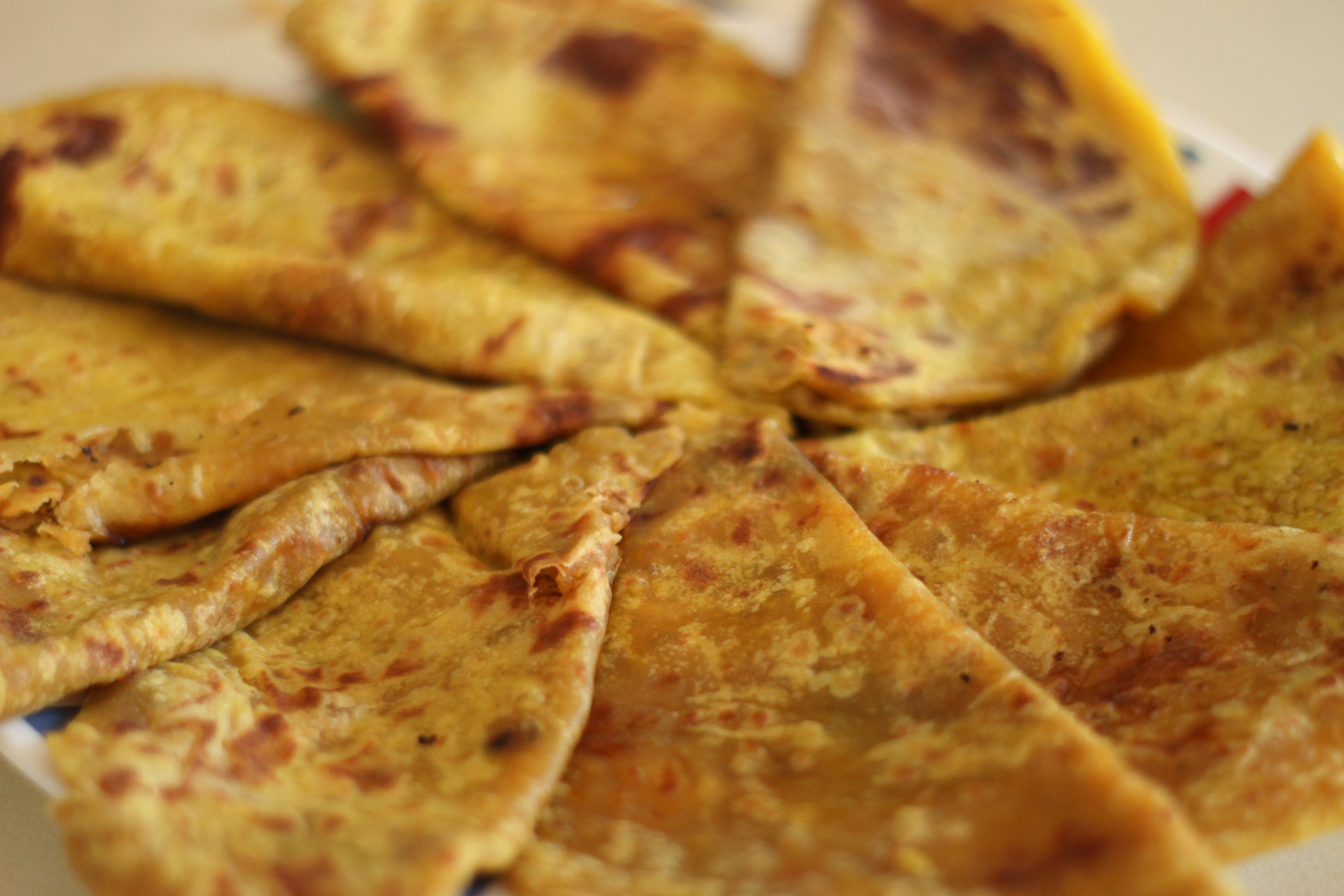
Holige or Obbattu from Karnataka

There is a reference to this dish in the Sanskrit encyclopedia Manasōllāsa in the 12th century written by King Someshvara in Karnataka.

Its recipe (as bakshyam) is mentioned in Manucharitra, a 14th-century Telugu encyclopaedia compiled by Allasani Peddanna hailing from present-day Andhra Pradesh. Bhavaprakash and Bhaishajya Ratnavali written by Govind Dasa state the recipe while explaining it as part of Ayurvedic preparations.

== Ingredients ==
Holige is made from senaga pappu(harbara daal,हरबरा दाल), plain flour (wheat flour), maida, jaggery or cane sugar, cardamom powder and/or nutmeg powder, cinnamon powder, ghee and water. In Maharashtra, Maida or wheat flour, Jaggery, nutmeg powder, Chana Dal/Bengal gram, Ghee, and cardamom powder is used. Sometimes, pigeon pea is used in Gujarat. It is commonly used in the state of Karnataka and Tamil Nadu as well. In Andhra Pradesh and other places, pesara pappu, chickpea (senaga pappu) or a mix is used. Other ingredients that may or may not be used are: nuts, dates, and turmeric powder.

== Nutritional value ==
The predominant ingredients are chana, plain flour, jaggery or sugar.

1. Chana: It is a variant of chickpea. It provides fiber, is a major source of protein, may help reduce cholesterol and also contains zinc, folate and calcium Toor dal can be used in place of chana dal and it has similar properties as of chana dal.

2. Plain flour, jaggery or sugar: These are the major sources of carbohydrates. While plain flour adds complex carbohydrates, jaggery and sugar are simple carbohydrates.

== Regional variants ==
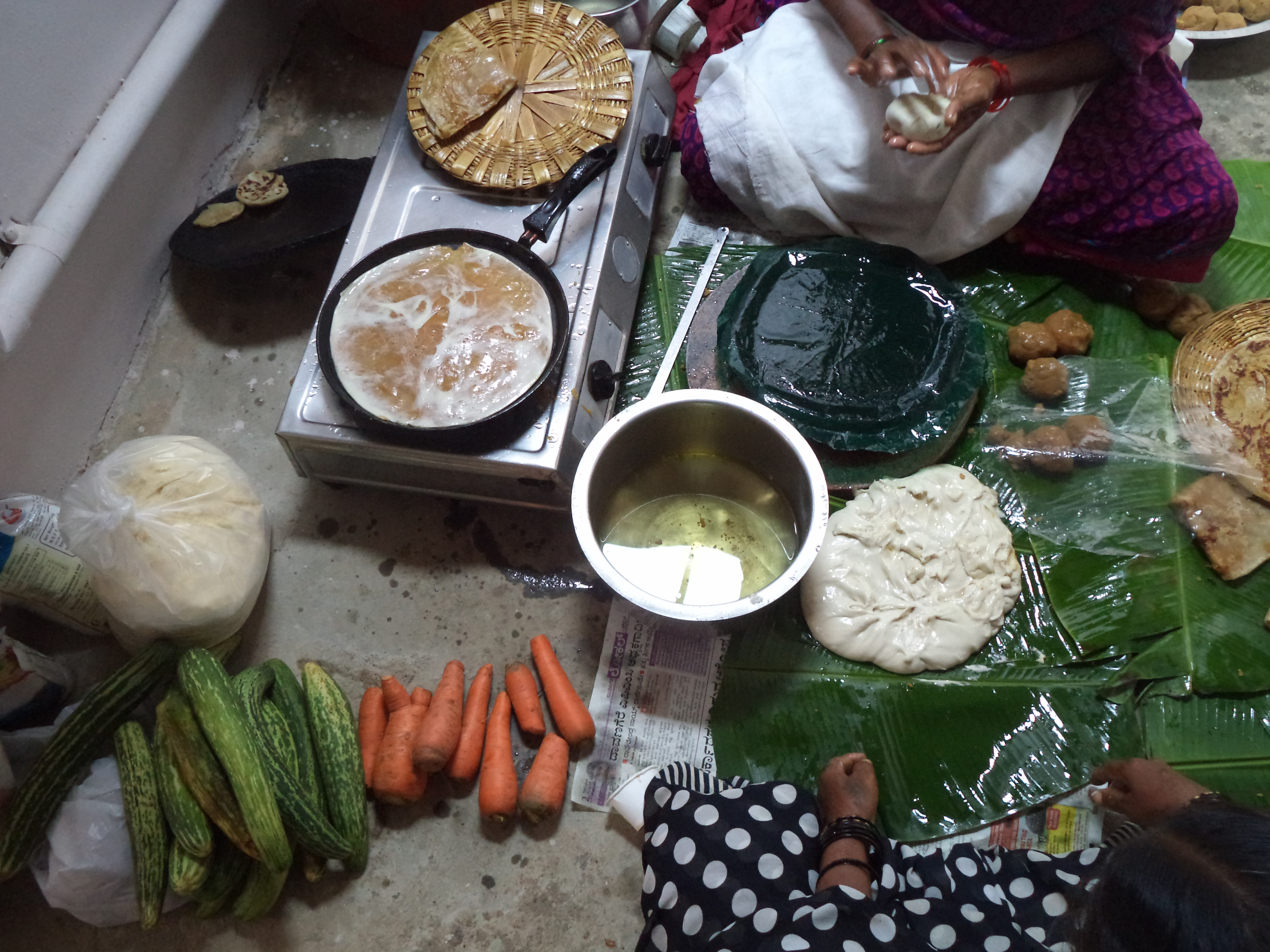
The preparation of holige

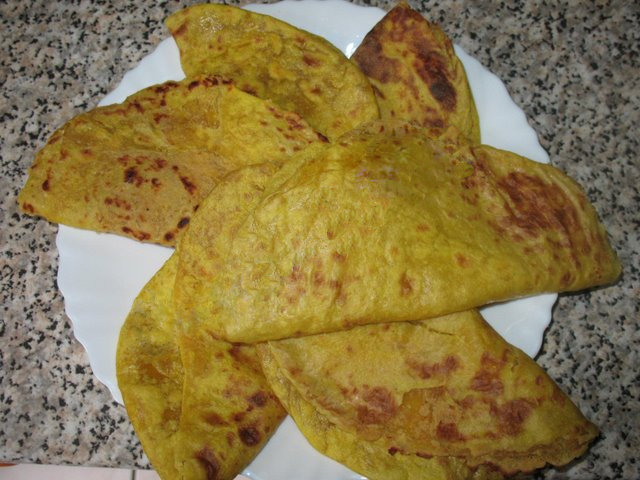
Puran poli recipe marathi (chana dal puran poli) or bele obbattu

The method of preparation varies from place to place. There are many varieties of Obbattu including peanut, sugar, coconut, sesame and groundnut flavours. Sometimes grated coconut is added in Konkan, Maharashtra. Coconut palm jaggery may be used. Similarly, a mix of sugar and jaggery can be used as a sweetening agent. Normally nutmeg is used as a flavouring along the coast which is replaced by cardamom elsewhere or sometimes both are used. Methods of rolling the stuffed dough also differ. It can be rolled using rice flour which makes the rolling very convenient. In some recipes flour is not used at all; oil or ghee is used to roll it into a flatbread instead. The rolled bread can be roasted with or without any ghee or oil, which sometimes is smeared after it is completely cooked. In some places, all-purpose flour dough is used after adding a pinch of turmeric which gives it a traditional yellow color. The dish is produced using a sweet filling inside flour dough. This is then rolled out and cooked on a hot griddle, usually with ghee.

The size and thickness of puran puri also vary greatly. In Gujarat where the stuffing used is toor dal, it is smaller in size and thicker, whereas in holige with coconut stuffing it is larger in size and thinner.

=== Maharashtra ===
It is the special dish of Maharashtra which is prepared on every occasion at every house, especially during festivals such as Gudhi Padwa, Akshaya Tritiya, Ganesh Chaturthi and Holi. It is eaten with Basundi, Aamras, Kadhi, Amti, etc. In Maharashtra, Puran Poli is eaten with a variant of Amti (flavored sour curry) known as Katachi Amti which is prepared with the remaining water of cooked Chana Dal used to make Puran Poli. Mainly jaggery is used in puran poli for sweetness. It is eaten with Vada (Bhaji) – a pakora made of all lentils. In some regions of Maharashtra, Puran Poli is served with a dollop of ghee on top, which enhances its flavor and richness. The texture and taste of Puran Poli can vary from region to region, with some areas making it thinner and crispier, while others make it thicker and softer. The process of making Puran Poli can also differ slightly depending on the region, with some using a rolling pin to flatten the dough while others use their hands to shape it. The North-Maharashtra (Khandesh) region makes it using hand and calls it Khapar chi Puran Poli or simply Mande which is huge in size and difficult to make.

=== Andhra Pradesh ===
It is popularly called bobbattu and served on major festive and other occasions. It is one of the sweets of Coastal Andhra. The stuff used inside the bobbattu varies according to the region. It is served hot and eaten by applying a layer of ghee to it. Rava bobbattu is another variant of bobbattu. It is called obattu in Rayalaseema region of Andhra Pradesh and poli in northeast Andhra Pradesh.

=== Karnataka ===
It is a special dish served in the state of Karnataka on all occasions, especially during Yugadi (ಯುಗಾದಿ). Different varieties of holige are served in various parts of Karnataka and the most common is the one prepared with yellow gram and sugar or jaggery and obbattu is also prepared using coconut and sugar as the ingredients.

=== Tamil Nadu and Kerala ===
Opputtu in Tamil Nadu and payasaboli in Kerala is a golden-yellow sweet pancake from Tamil Nadu and Kerala. It is eaten during a traditional sadhya along with payasam. Several varieties of opputtu are prepared, including thenga (coconut) boli and sharkara (brown sugar).

Opputtu is typically consumed after lunch or as an evening snack, and is commonly sold by hawkers on trains.

Trivandrum poli is also a variety from Kerala.

Varieties of opputtu are available throughout the Deccan states.

== See also ==
- List of Indian breads
- List of Indian sweets
