= Laung lata =

Traditional sweet from India and Bangladesh

Lavang lata/ Lobongo Lotika
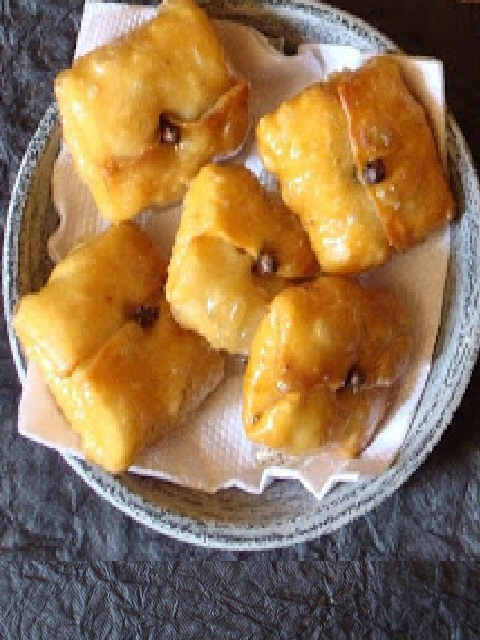
- Laung lata with lavang in center of it
- Course: Dessert
- Place of origin: India; Bangladesh

Lobongo Lotika, also called Labanga Lata , Lavang lata or Laung Lata, is a traditional sweet from the regions of Eastern Uttar Pradesh, Bengal, Odisha, and Bihar. It is particularly popular in Bihar and is commonly sold in sweet shops across the state.

== Ingredients ==
A typical labanga latika is made of maida, khoya, nutmeg powder, grated coconut, ghee, nuts, raisins, cardamom, cloves, and sugar ingredients.

== Preparation ==
Labanga latika consists of filling, dough, and sugar syrup. The dough is rolled out first and then the filling is placed in the center. The dough is then folded to enclose the filling completely and cloves are pressed over it to ensure that the fold doesn't open up while preparing. Then it's cooked in hot ghee until golden brown and crispy. Lastly, it is placed in sugar syrup to cool down and absorb the syrup

=== Dough ===
The dough is prepared in maida with water and ghee until the desired consistency is reached.

=== Sugar syrup ===
Sugar syrup is a mixture of sugar and water, prepared by adding sugar to boiling water and stirring as to prevent burning. This continues until the mixture reaches a thick consistency.

=== Filling ===
The filling is a mixture of khoya, sugar, and grated coconut. These are to be cooked and adorned with dried fruits and nutmeg.

== See also ==
- List of desserts
