= Palathalikalu =

Indian sweet dish

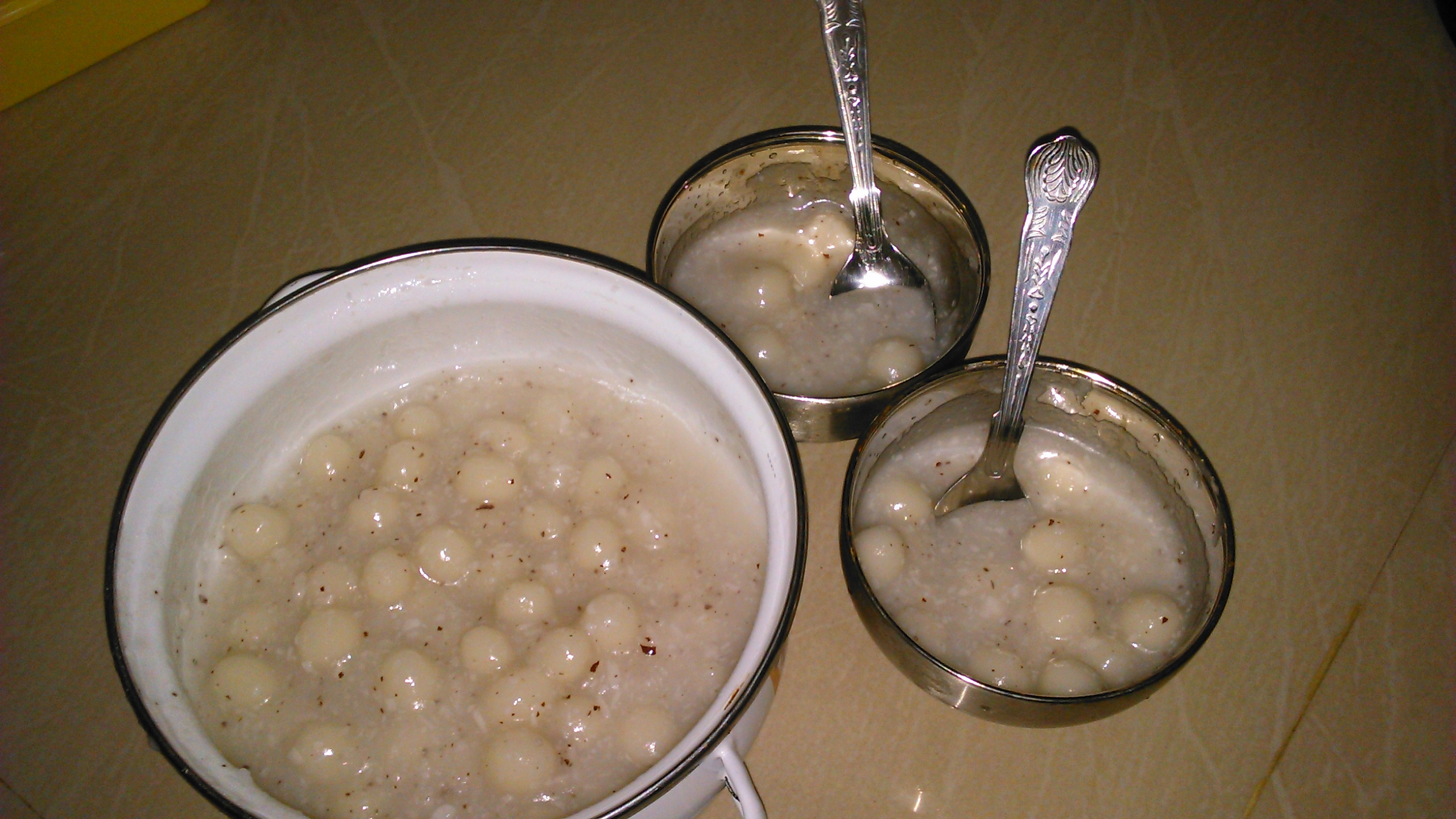
- Palathalikalu or Paal kozhukattai
- Place of origin: India
- Region or state: Delta Region of Coastal Andhra
- Main ingredients: Rice flour, milk

Palathalikalu (Telugu: పాలతాలికలు) or Paal kozhukattai (Tamil:பால் கொழுக்கட்டை) is an Indian sweet dish made during Ganesh Chaturthi in the Delta region of Andhra Pradesh, India. It is made of rice flour, sago, and clarified butter, which is made into a dough and cooked or steamed in milk, and garnished with cashews, raisins, and cardamom powder.
