= Dhondas =

Indian dessert

- Place of origin: India
- Region or state: Goa, West India
- Main ingredients: Jackfruit or cucumber, rava, jaggery, grated coconut

Dhondas is an Indian sweet made from jackfruit or cucumber, rava, coconut and jaggery.
