= Kalakand =

Sweet cheese confection from India

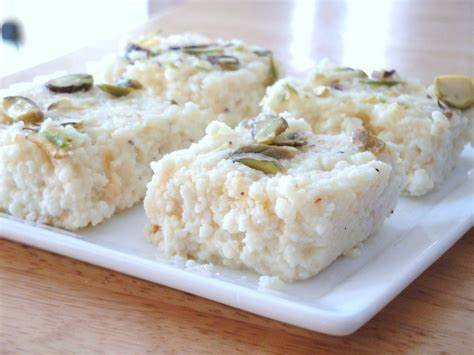
- Kalakand from Koderma, India
- Course: Dessert
- Place of origin: India
- Region or state: Indian subcontinent
- Main ingredients: Chhena, milk, water, sugar, ghee or butter, pistachios

Kalakand is a sweet cheese confection from India. It has been described as "akin to Italian cheesecake, firmer in texture than milk cake, but softer than burfis."

== History ==
The earliest mention of kalakand as a sweet appears in the 19th-century Urdu text Zīnat al-ʿarūs. However, contemporary sources state that kalakand was invented in the Baba Thakur Das & Sons halwai (confectioner) shop in Alwar, Rajasthan in 1947, where it is still sold today.

== Preparation ==
To make kalakand, chhena (Indian cheese) is prepared and strained. Separately, whole milk and water are mixed, boiled, and stirred continuously until the mixture is reduced to half its original volume. The strained chhena is softened using a food processor or by hand kneading. It is then added to the reduced milk-water mixture and cooked until it becomes a thick paste. Then sugar is added, and the mixture is cooked on low heat and stirred continuously until it thickens to a fudge-like consistency. Then ghee (clarified butter) or butter is added, and the mixture is cooked and stirred another five minutes until it acquires a glossy appearance. The mixture is spread onto a buttered tray or platter in the form of a rectangle and garnished with pistachios. After cooling, it is cut into squares and served.

== See also ==
- List of Indian sweets and desserts
- List of Pakistani sweets and desserts
