= Mahim halwa =

Semolina halva

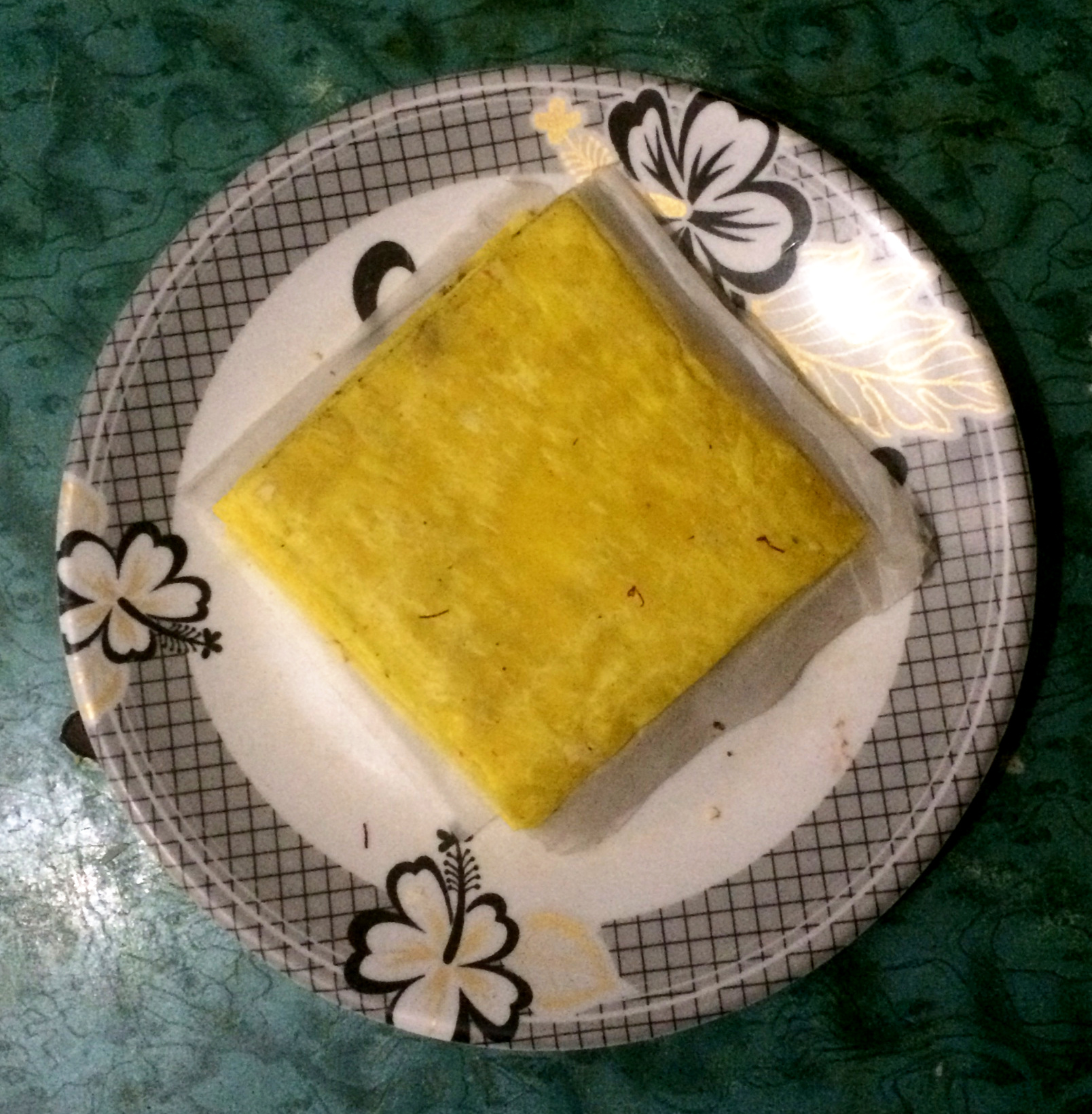
- Photo of Mahim halwa
- Region or state: Mumbai, India

Mahim halwa is an Indian sweet (translated as "layered semolina sweet") named after Mahim, an area in Mumbai. It is also known as Ice Halwa. It is named so because it was created by the sweetmeat makers Joshi Budhakaka from Mahim. It is a food speciality that Mumbai is famous for. It has been described as a "unique confection of thin layers of sweet dough pressed into compact squares and separated by sheets of greaseproof paper". A 2010 news story reported attempts to obtain geographical indication registration for the sweet.

== See also ==
- Halva
