= Vark =

Metallic leaf used on Indian sweets

Vark or Waraq
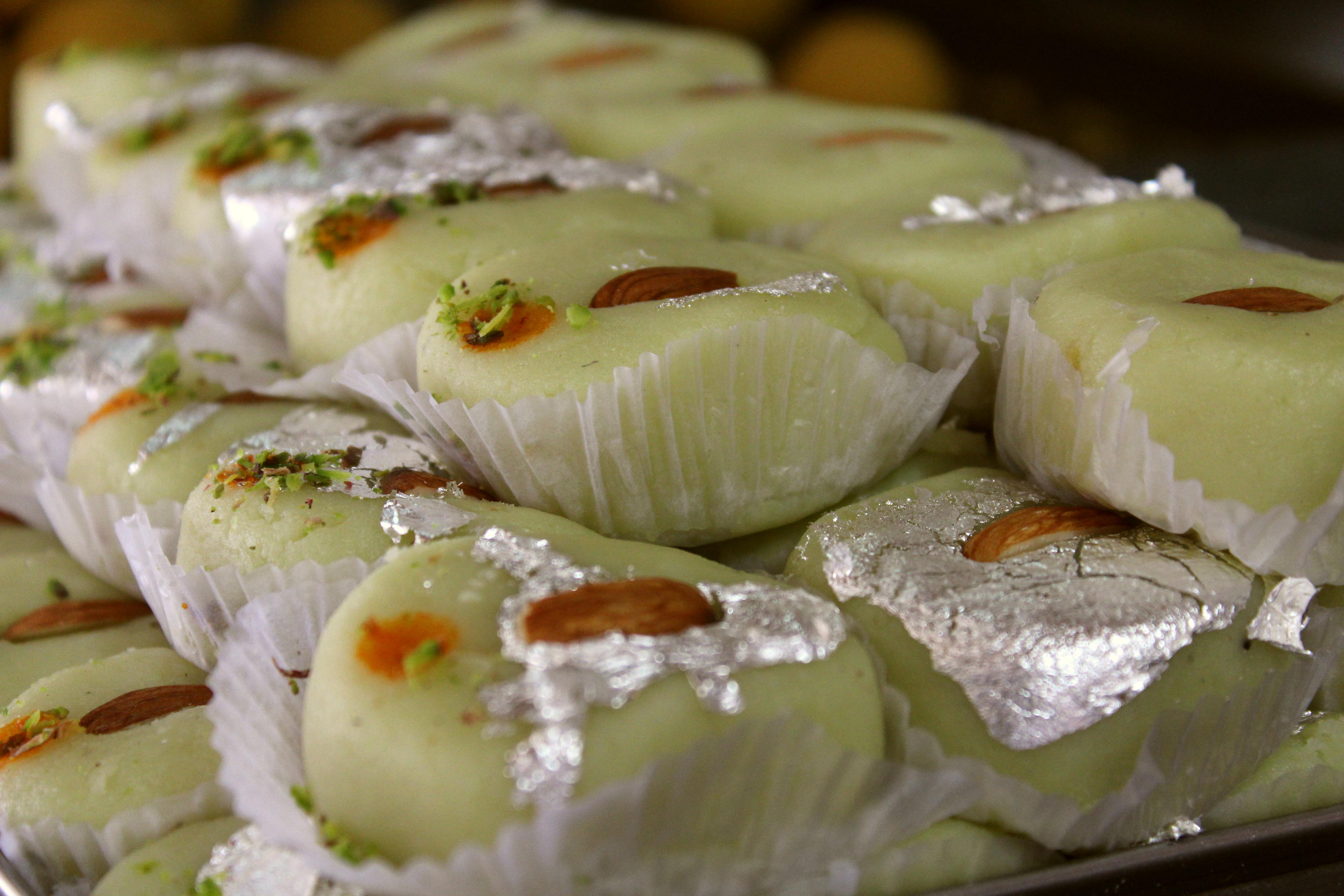
- Indian barfi sweets garnished with vark
- Alternative names: Varq, varaq, vark, varak, varakh, varakha, etc.
- Type: Garnish
- Place of origin: Indian subcontinent
- Region or state: Indian subcontinent
- Main ingredients: Silver, Gold

Vark (also varak, varaq, waraq, or warq) is a fine filigree foil sheet of pure metal, typically silver but sometimes gold, used to decorate Indian sweets and food. The silver and gold are edible, though flavorless. Vark is made by pounding silver into sheets less than one micrometre (μm) thick, typically 0.2–0.8 μm. The silver sheets are typically packed between layers of paper for support; this paper is peeled away before use. It is fragile and breaks into smaller pieces if handled with direct skin contact. Leaf that is 0.2 μm thick tends to stick to skin if handled directly.

Vark sheets are laid or rolled over some Indian sweets, confectionery, dry fruits and spices. It is also placed onto mounds of saffron rice on platters.

For safety and ethical reasons, the Government of India has issued food safety and product standards guidelines for manufacturers of silver foil.

== History ==
=== Etymology ===
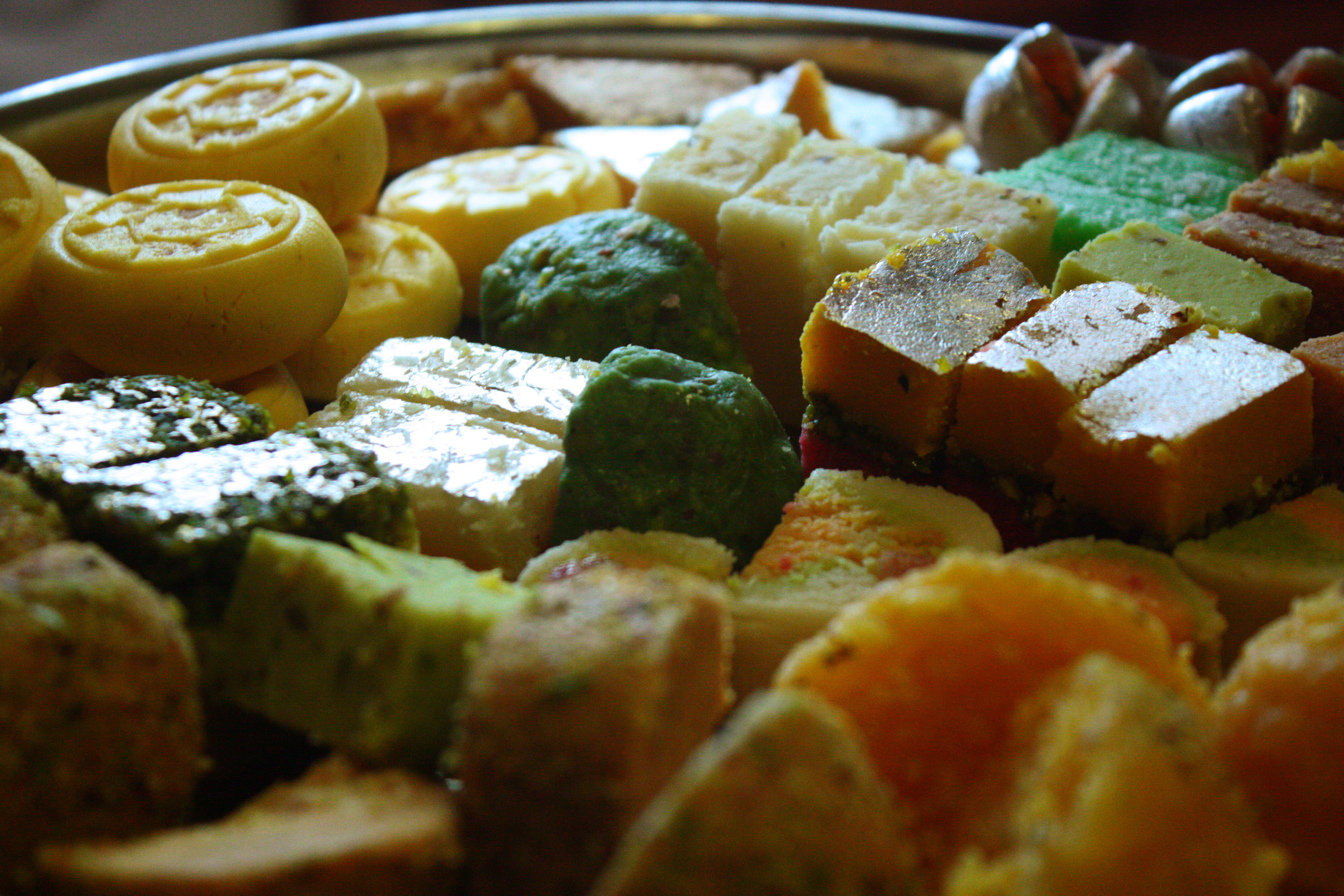
A tray of Indian sweets, with some pieces covered with shiny vark

Vark is sometimes spelled varaq, varq, vark, varkh, varakh, varkha, or waraq (Hindi: वरक़, Urdu: ورق Urdu pronunciation: [ʋəɾəq]). In Arabic, waraq (ورق), means a leaf, paper sheet, banknote or metal foil. This word was first borrowed into Persian and then subsequently borrowed into Hindustani.

== Product ==
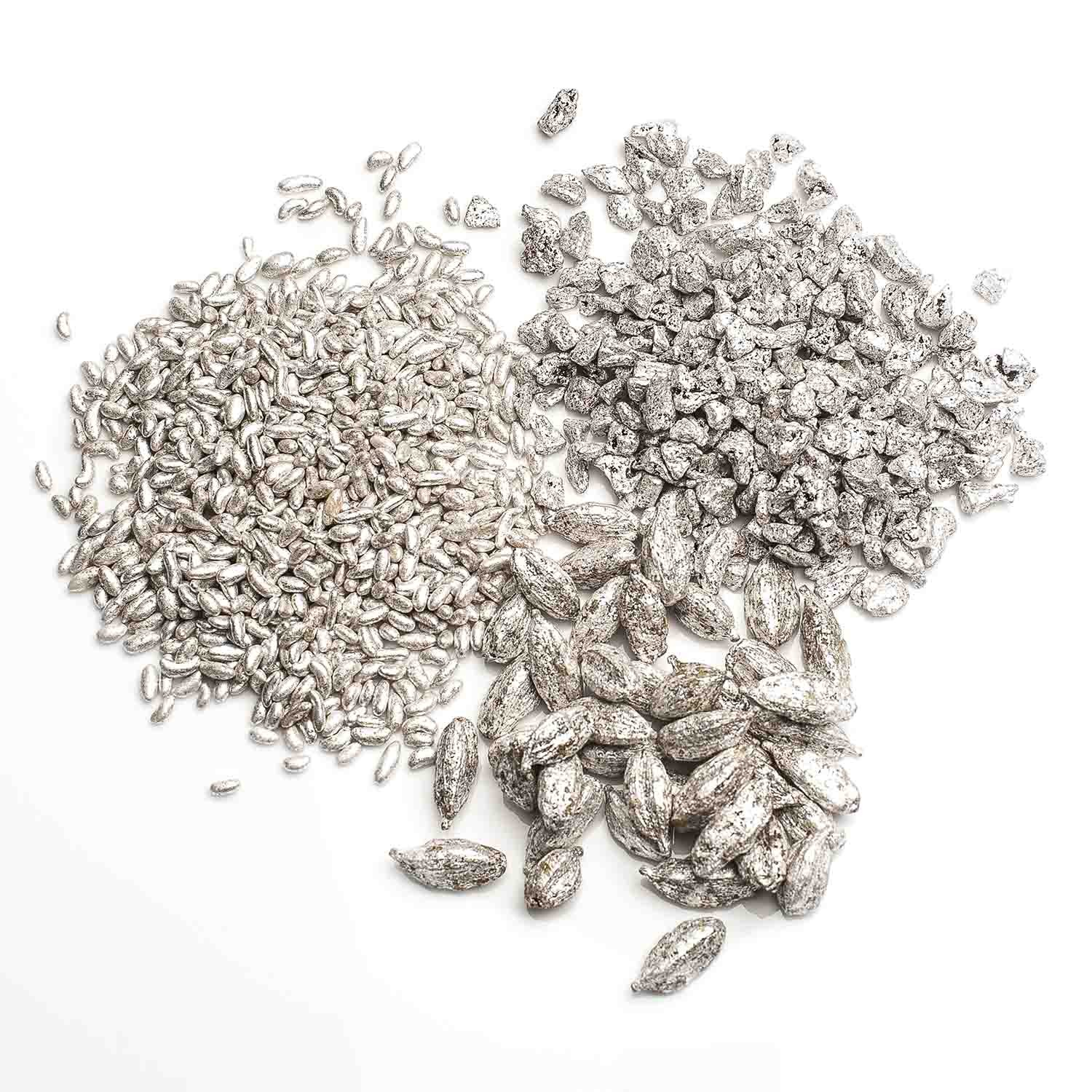
Silver-coated spices

=== Manufacturing ===
Vark is made by placing the pure metal dust between parchment sheets, then pounding the sheets until the metal dust molds into a foil, usually less than one micrometre (μm) thick, typically 0.2–0.8 μm. The sheets are typically packed with paper for support; this paper is peeled away before use. It generally takes 2 hours to pound the silver particles into foils.

Particles were traditionally manually pounded between the layers of ox gut or cow hide. It is easier to separate the silver leaf from the animal tissue than to separate it from the paper. Due to the concerns of the vegetarian population of India, manufacturers have switched to the modern technologies that have evolved for the production of silver leaves in India, Germany, Russia and China. Modern technologies include beating over sheets of black special treated paper or polyester sheets coated with food-grade calcium powder (nicknamed "German plastic") instead of ox guts or cow hide. Old City in Hyderabad used to be the hub of traditional manual manufacturing, where it is a dying trade. Delhi is a new hub of vark manufacturing in India.

=== Usage as food ===
The silver is edible, though flavourless. It is commonly used in India, Pakistan, and Bangladesh as coating on sweets, dry fruits, and in sugar balls, betel nuts, cardamom, and other spices. Estimated consumption of vark is 275 tons annually.

Using edible silver and gold foils on sweets, confectionery and desserts is not unique to the Indian subcontinent; other regions such as Japan and Europe also use precious metal foils as food cover and decoration, including specialty drinks such as Goldwasser and Goldschläger.

=== Vegetarian ethical issues ===
Concerns have been raised about the ethical acceptability and food safety of vark, as not all of it is pure silver, nor hygienically prepared, and the foil was until fairly recently beaten between layers of ox gut because it is easier to separate the silver leaf from animal tissue than to separate it from paper. Due to the grinding effect of the hammering, some of the animal intestine becomes part of the silver foil, which is sold in bulk. Since Jains and a considerable percentage of Hindus are vegetarian, this led to the decline in the usage of vark in sweets or suparis. Indian Airlines asked its caterers to not apply vark to the food supplied to ensure no animal intestine is present. In 2016, the government of India banned the usage of animal guts or skins in the making of vark. Consequently, the Indian market for vark has mostly converted to using the machine-based vegetarian process in the making of the silver foils. Food Safety and Standards Authority of India has issued guidelines for the silver leaf manufactures to adhere to regarding thickness, weight, purity, labeling and hygiene of the silver leaf.

=== Safety ===
Gold and silver are approved food foils in the European Union, as E175 and E174 additives respectively. The independent European food-safety certification agency, TÜV Rheinland, has deemed gold leaf safe for consumption. Gold and silver leaf are also certified as kosher. These inert precious metal foils are not considered toxic to human beings nor to broader ecosystems. Large quantities of ingested bioactive silver can cause argyria, but the use of edible silver or gold as vark is not considered harmful to the body, since the metal is in an inert form (not ionic bioactive form), and the quantities involved in normal use are minuscule.

One study has found that about 10% of 178 foils studied from the Lucknow (India) market were made of aluminium. Of the tested foils, 46% of the samples were found to have the desired purity requirement of 99.9% silver, whereas the rest had less than 99.9% silver. All the tested Indian foils contained on average trace levels of nickel (487 ppm), lead (301 ppm), copper (324 ppm), chromium (83 ppm), cadmium (97 ppm) and manganese (43 ppm). All of these are lower than natural anthropogenic exposures of these metals; the authors suggest there is a need to address a lack of purity standards in European Union and Indian food additive grade silver.

== See also ==
- Gilding
- Gold leaf
- Metal leaf
- Metallic dragée
- Rolling paper
