= Imarti =

Indian sweet

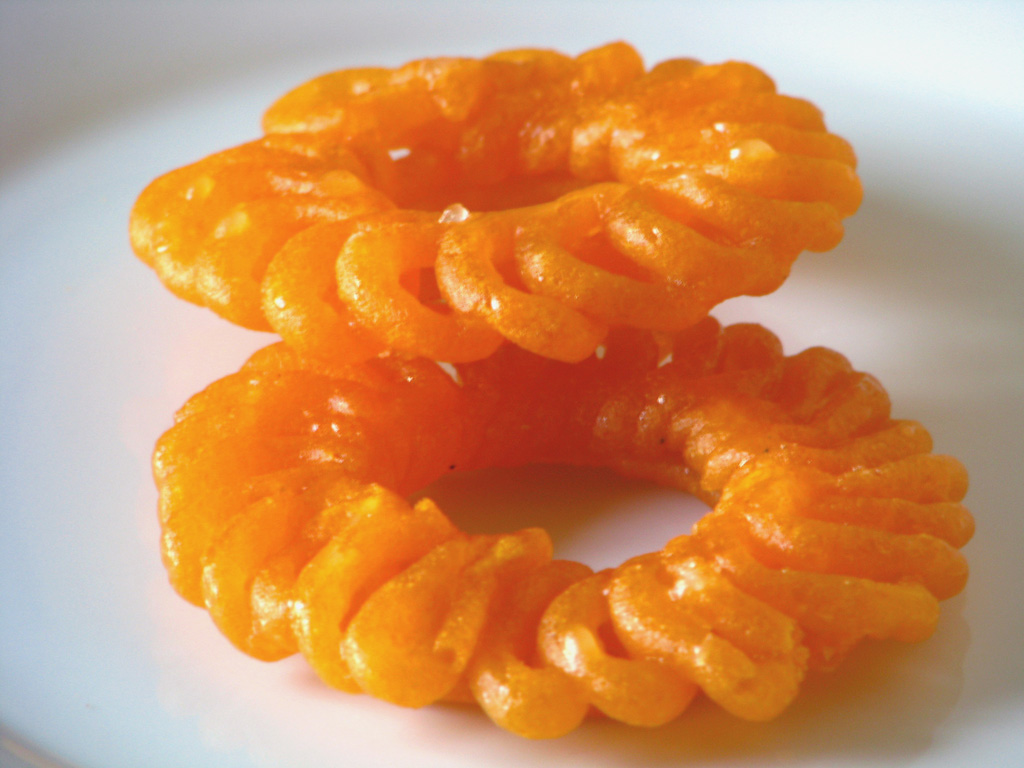
- Alternative names: Amriti; Jaangiri; Omriti
- Course: Dessert
- Place of origin: India
- Region or state: Indian subcontinent
- Main ingredients: Black gram flour, saffron, ghee, sugar
- Similar dishes: Jalebi, Chhena jalebi

Imarti, also known as amriti, jaangiri, or omriti, is an Indian sweet made by deep-frying a batter prepared with black gram flour in a circular, flower-like shape, and then soaking it in sugar syrup. This dish is similar to jalebi, which is thinner and sweeter than imarti.

Imarti is a popular iftar food in Bangladesh, while in India, Jaunpur in Uttar Pradesh is famous for its imartis.

== Ingredients ==
Imartis are made from batter made using various varieties of black gram flour—called urad dal—in North India, while in Karnataka, Tamil Nadu, Andhra Pradesh, Telangana and other parts of the Indian subcontinent, jangiri parappu (jangiri black gram) is commonly used.

Saffron is added to the batter to give imartis their bright orange colour.

== Preparation ==
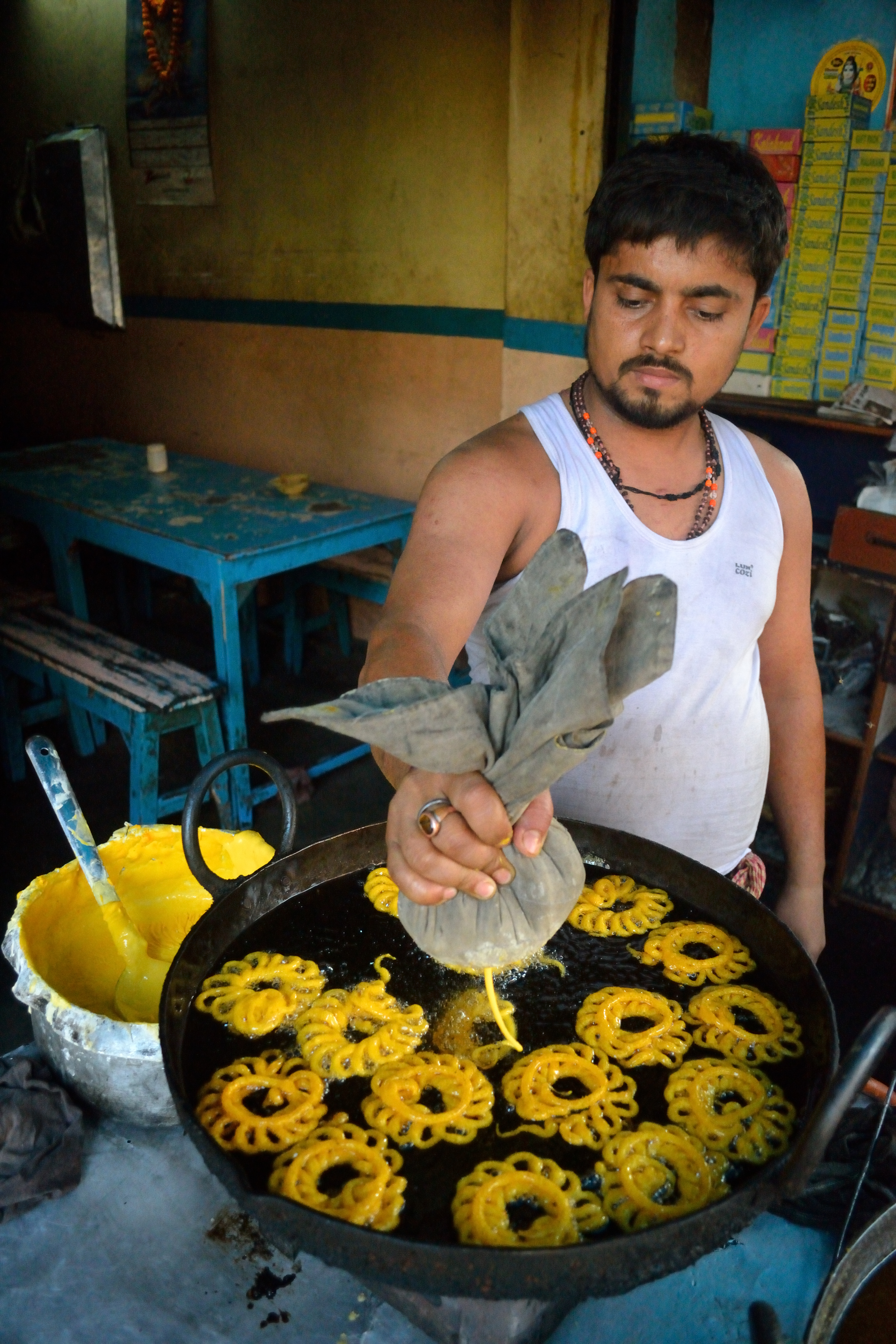
Amriti frying in Kolkata, India.

Black gram is soaked in water for a few hours, and then stone-ground into a fine batter. The batter is poured into ghee, though other oils are sometimes used. Like funnel cakes, the batter is poured into geometric patterns, although imartis are generally smaller than funnel cakes. There is often a small ring in the middle.

Before frying the batter, sugar syrup is prepared and is flavored with edible camphor, cloves, cardamom, kewra and saffron. The fried imartis are then dipped in sugar syrup until they expand in size, having soaked up a significant amount of the syrup. In Northern India, imartis are drained, and thus tend to be drier than jalebis. Imartis can be served hot, at room temperature, or cold.

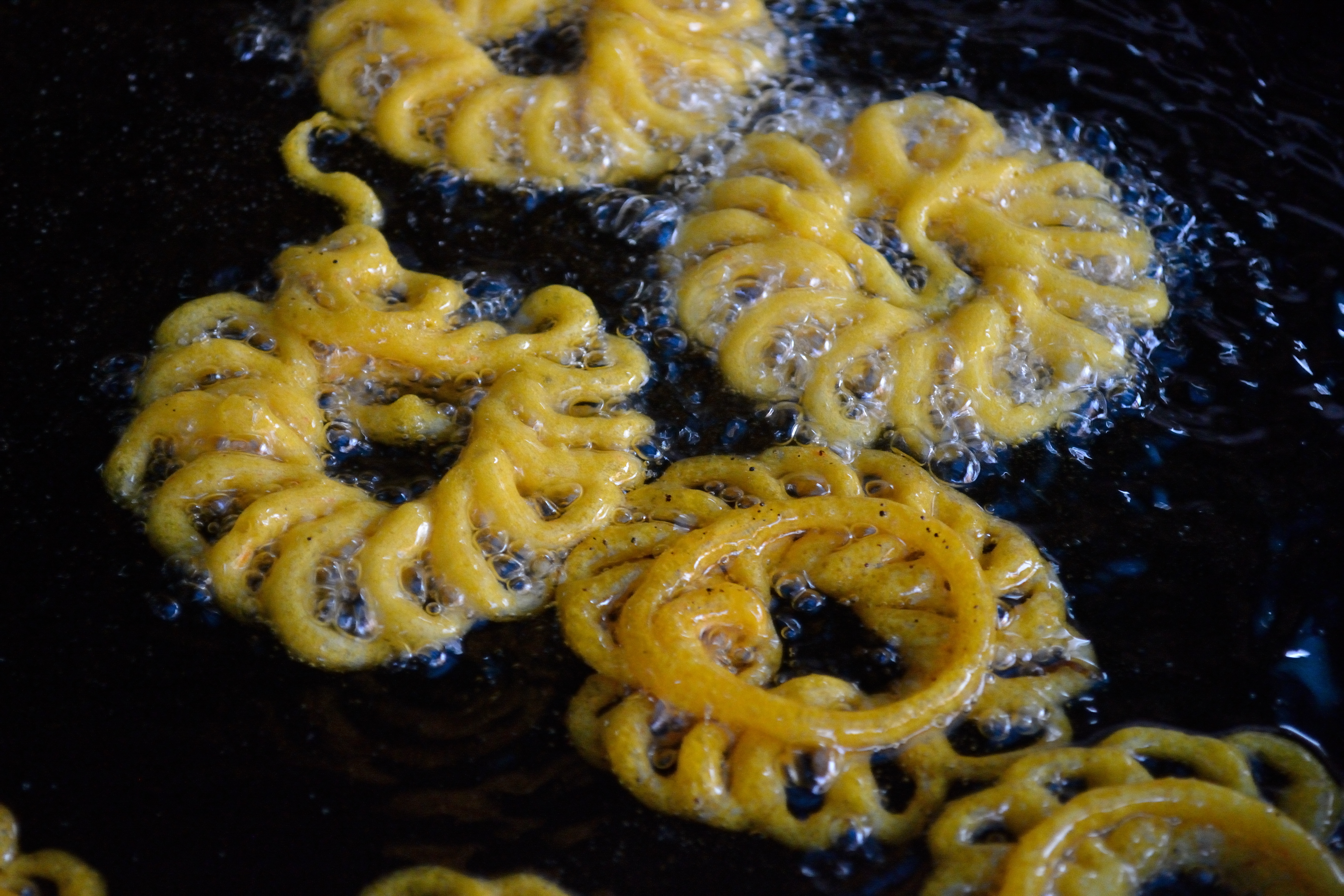
Frying process

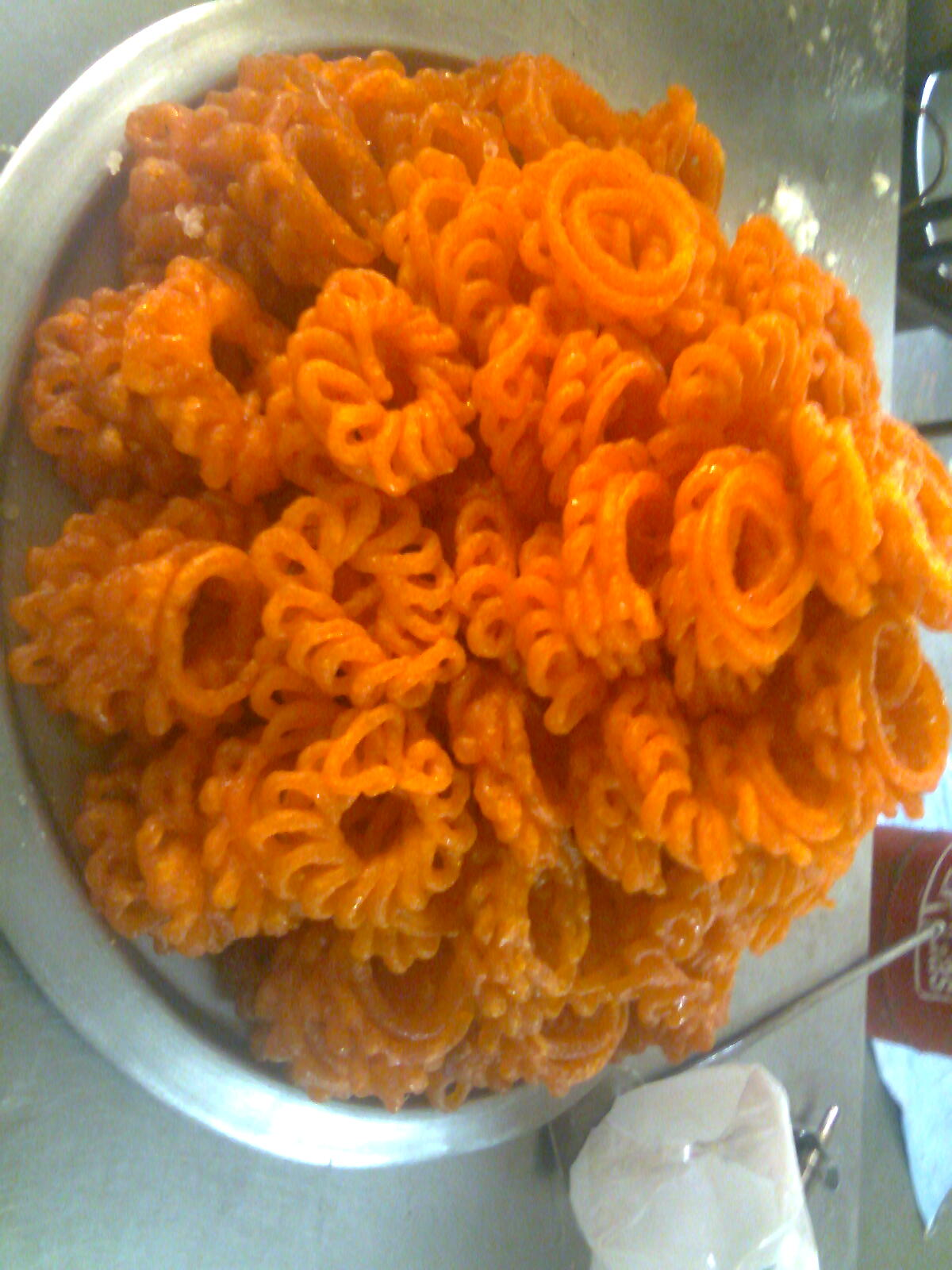
After frying

== Serving ==
In India, Imartis are served as dessert at the end of a meal, sometimes accompanied by dahi as a dipping. They are also distributed as sweets to relatives, guests and neighbours during celebrations, like festivals and marriages.

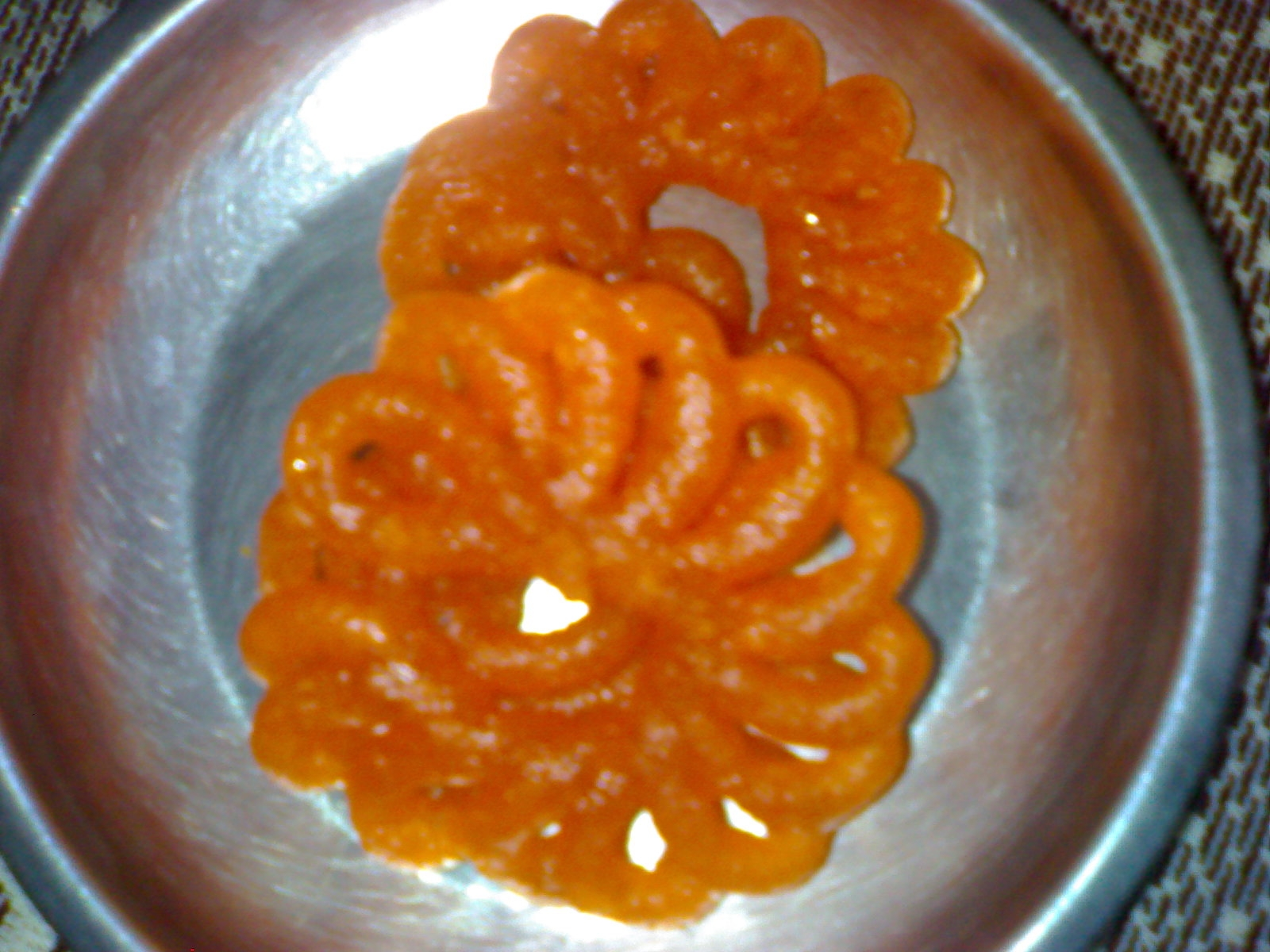
Imartis served as dessert in Tamil Nadu

== See also ==
- List of Indian sweets and desserts
- List of fried dough foods
- List of doughnut varieties
