= Barfi =

Milk-based sweet from the Indian subcontinent

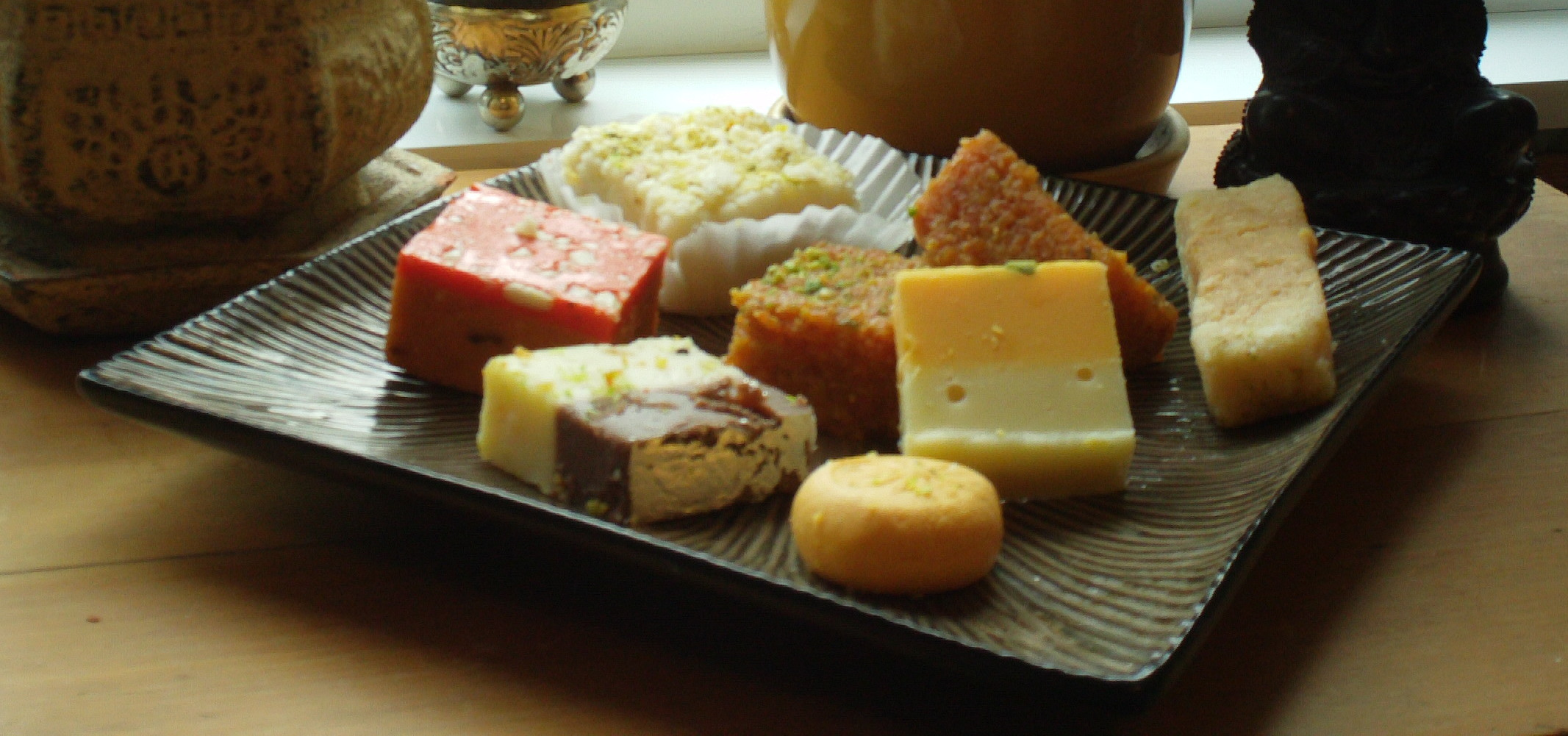
- Assortment of barfis
- Alternative names: Burfi
- Region or state: Indian subcontinent
- Main ingredients: Khoa, sugar
- Variations: Numerous

Barfi (Note: IAST: barfī [bəɾ.fiː]; Hindi: बर्फ़ी, Urdu: برفی) or burfi is a milk-based sweet from the Indian subcontinent with a fudge-like consistency. It is consumed throughout India and Pakistan and is especially popular in North India. Barfi is often served at celebrations and religious festivals such as Diwali and Holi.

== History and etymology ==
Barfi originated in Persia and was introduced to India by the Mughal Empire in the 16th century. Its name comes from the Persian and Urdu word (barf) for snow.

According to a story, kaju (cashew) barfi was first prepared by the Mughal emperor Jahangir's chef on the occasion of the release of the Sikh Guru Hargobind from prison.

== Preparation ==
To prepare barfi, khoa (milk solids) is mixed with granulated sugar and cooked, until it thickens to a fudge-like consistency. It is then spread onto a greased plate to cool. After cooling, it is cut into squares, diamonds, or circles. It can also be formed into balls, layered, or rolled into multicolored slices. When served at special occasions, it is often decorated with vark (edible silver foil). It can also be decorated with coconut, ground nuts, or powdered milk.

== Varieties ==
Fruit, nuts, legumes, spices, and other flavorings may be added to the khoa-sugar mixture and yield different varieties of barfi. Commonly added fruits include guava and melon seeds. Typical nuts added include almonds, cashews, coconut, and pistachios. Mung beans are sometimes added and yield moong dal barfi. Common flavorings and spices include cardamom, kewra (fragrant screwpine), orange, mango, saffron, rosewater, and vanilla. Food colorings may also be added.

== Around the world ==
Barfi is also popular in Trinidad and Tobago, where it was brought by indentured workers in the mid-19th century.

== Gallery ==
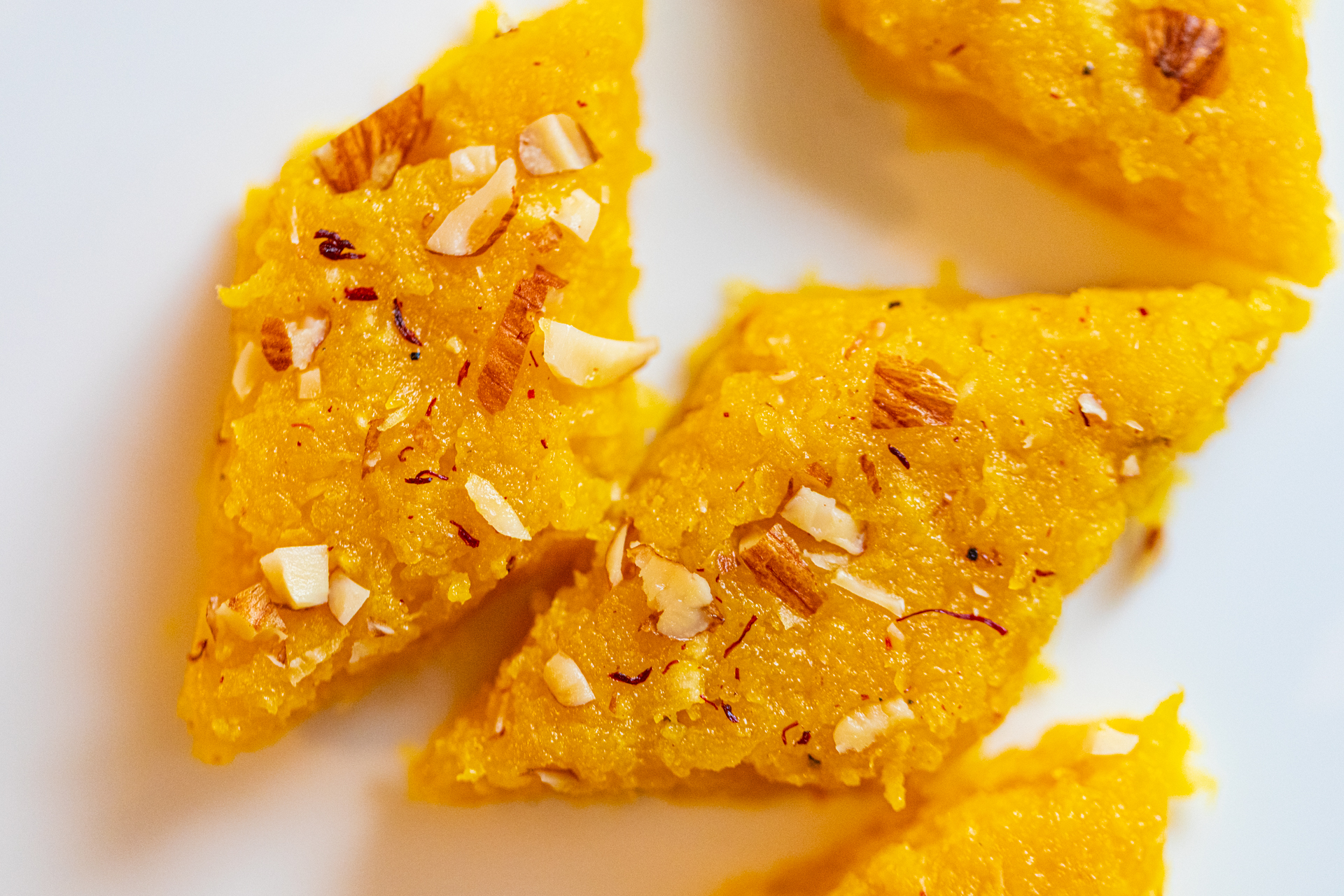
Coconut and mango barfi

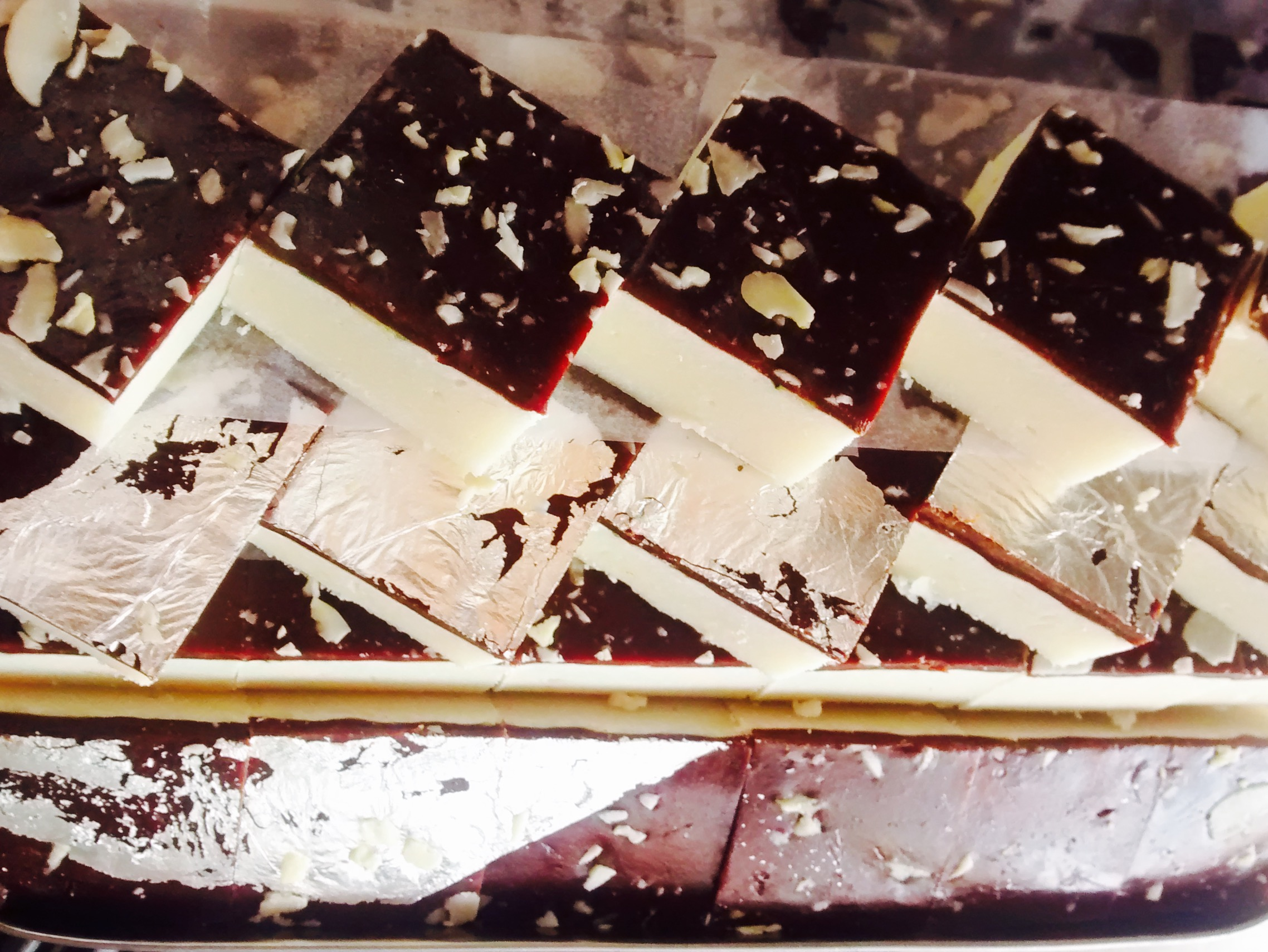
Chocolate barfi

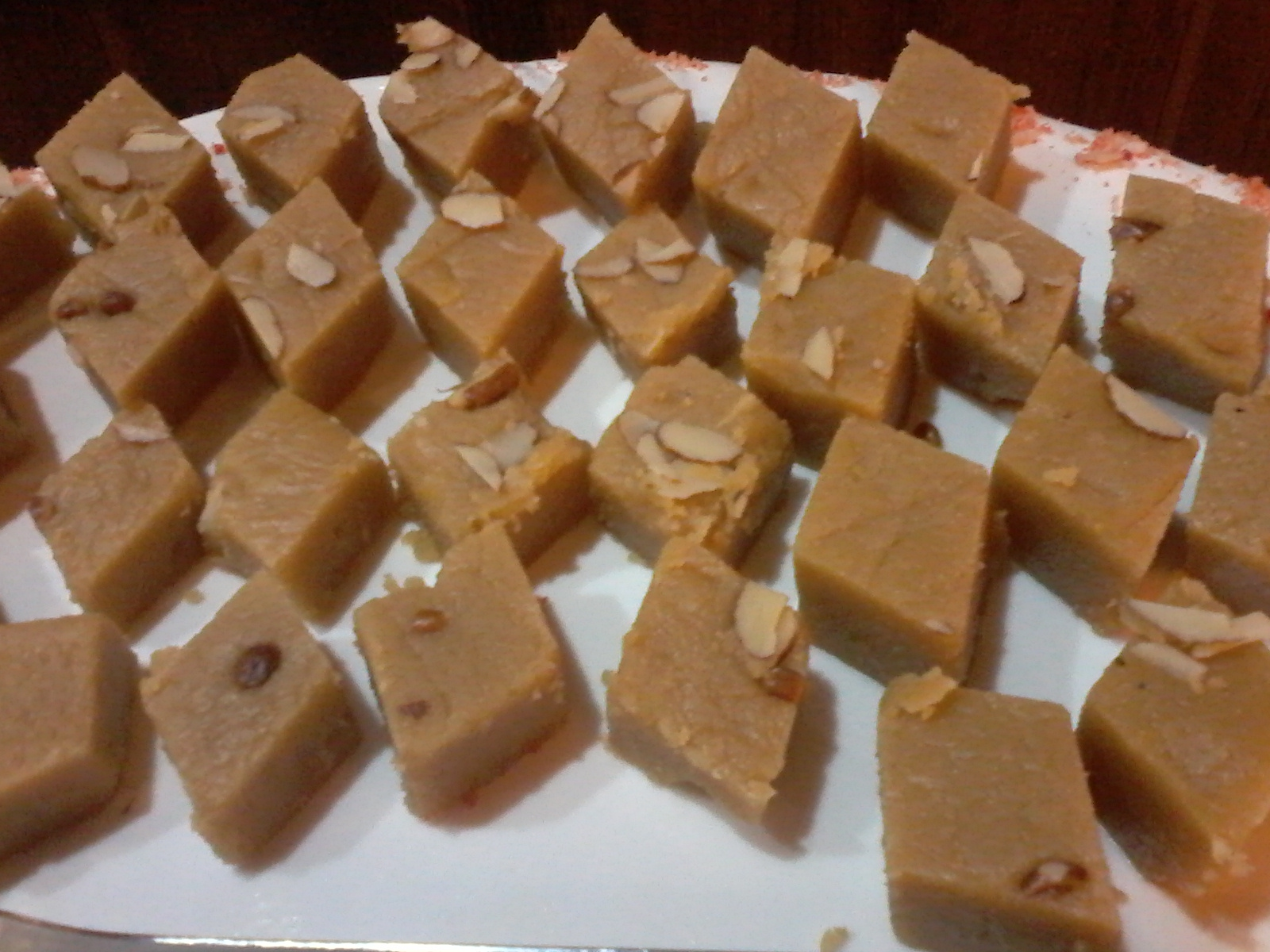
Badam (almond) barfi

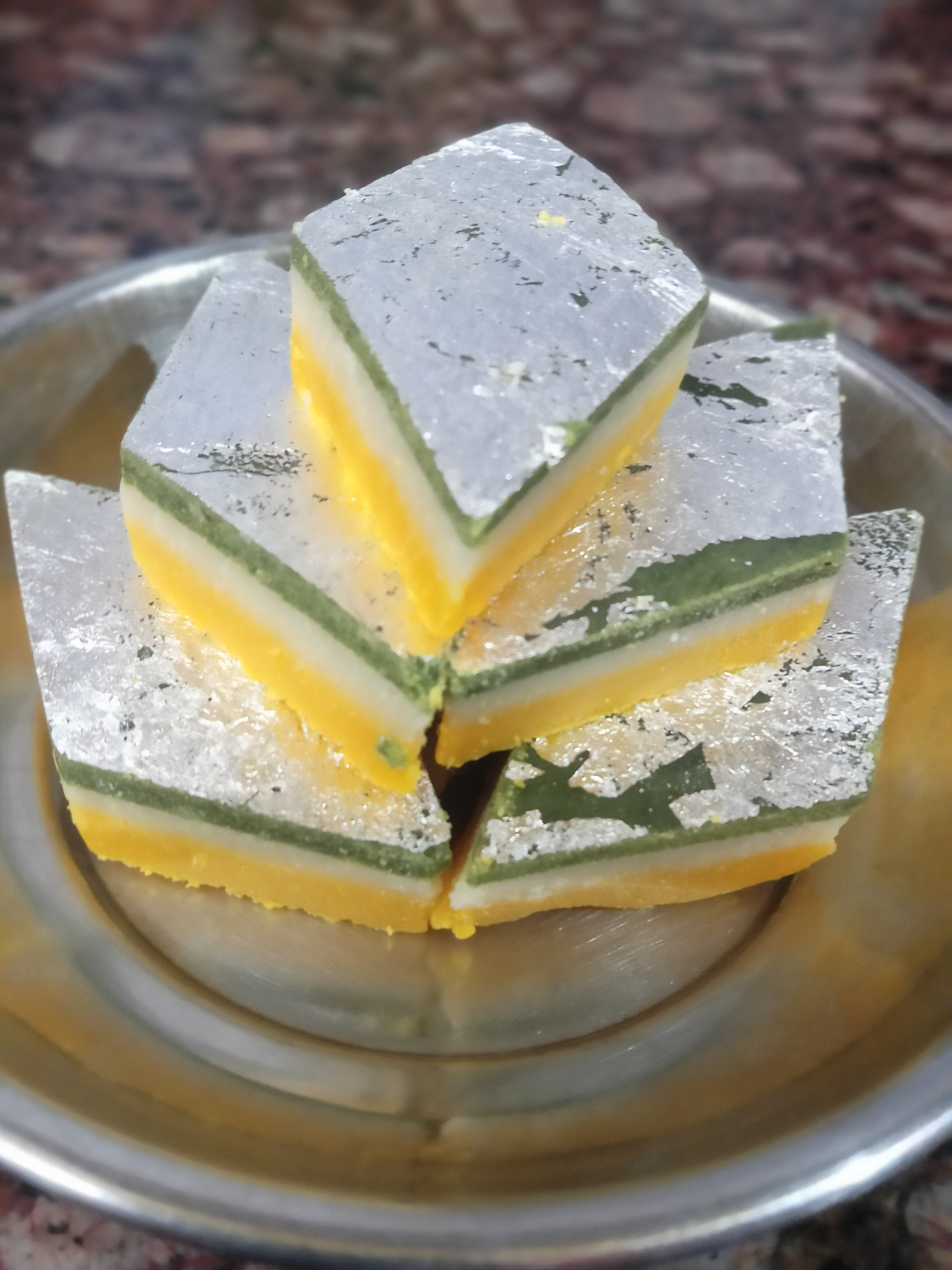
Tri-coloured kaju (cashew) barfi

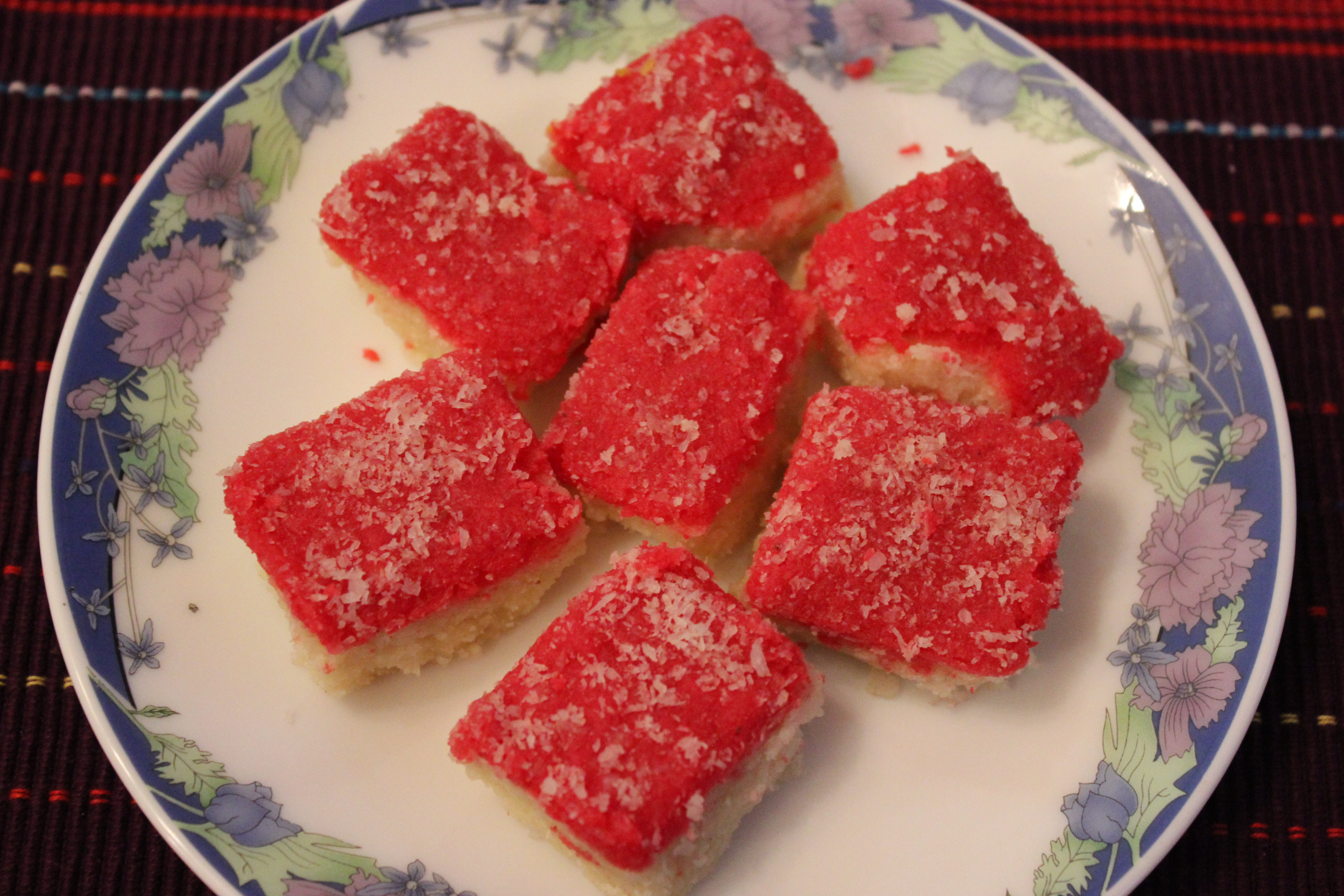
Coconut barfi

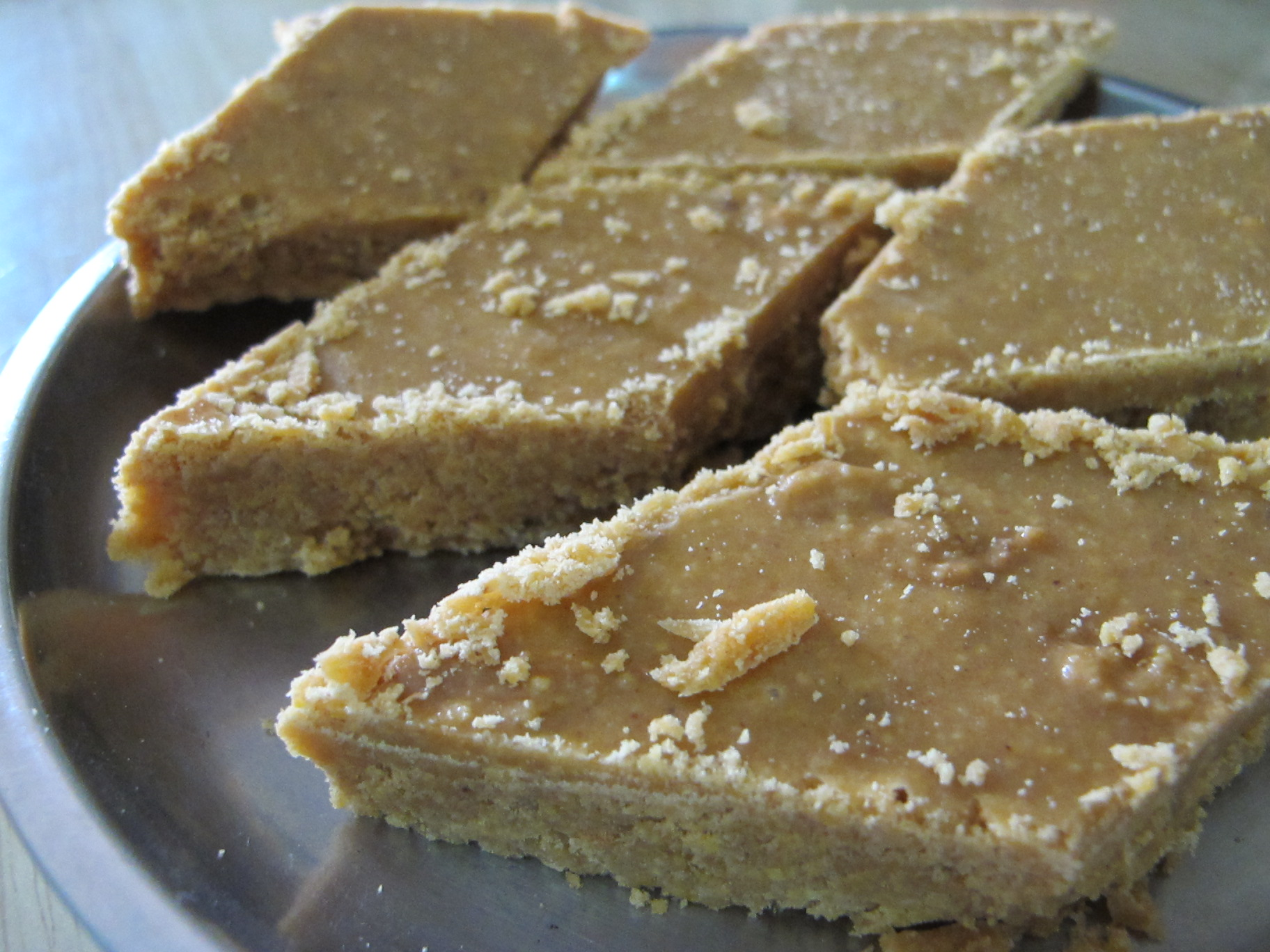
Besan (chickpea flour) barfi

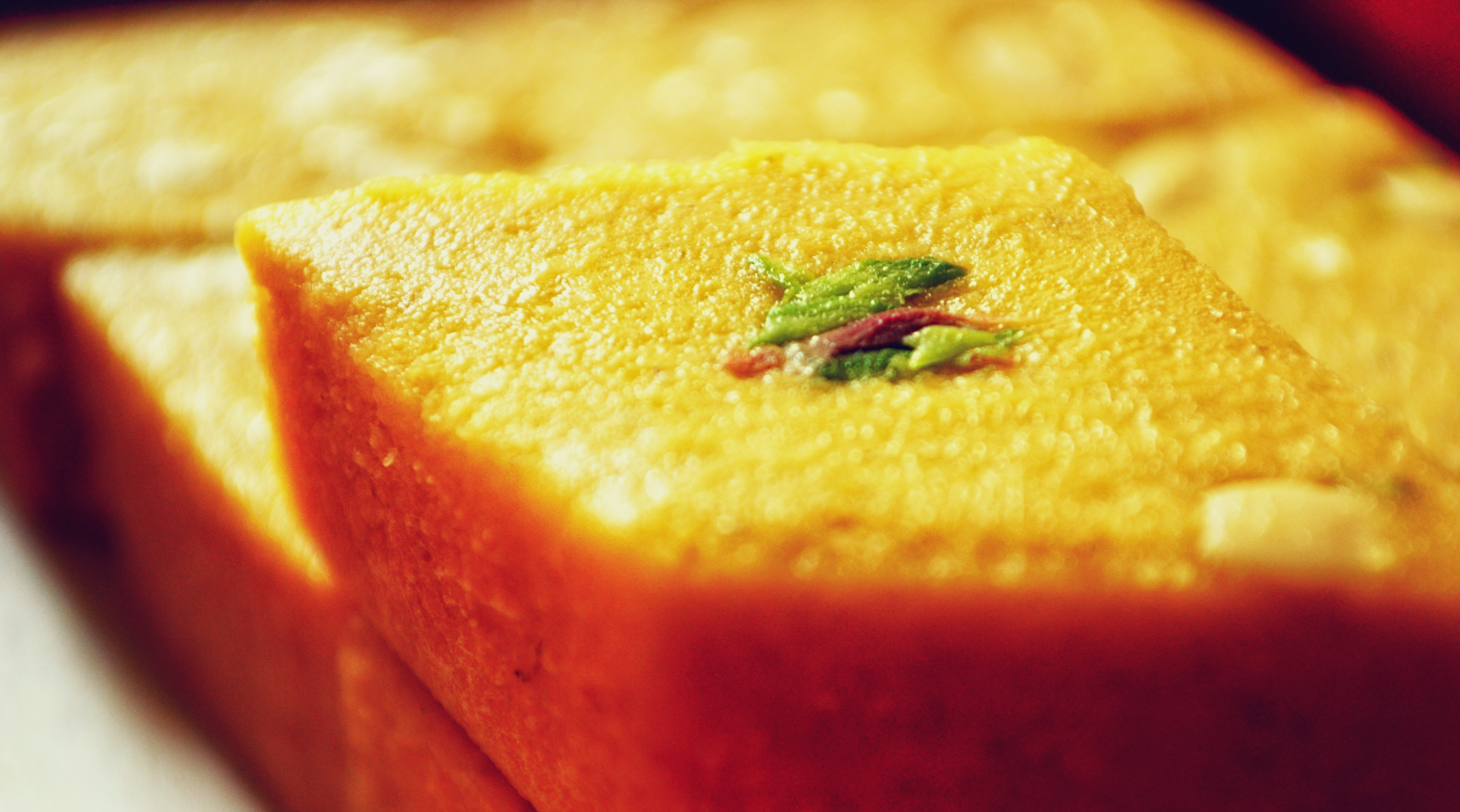
Moong dal (mung bean) barfi

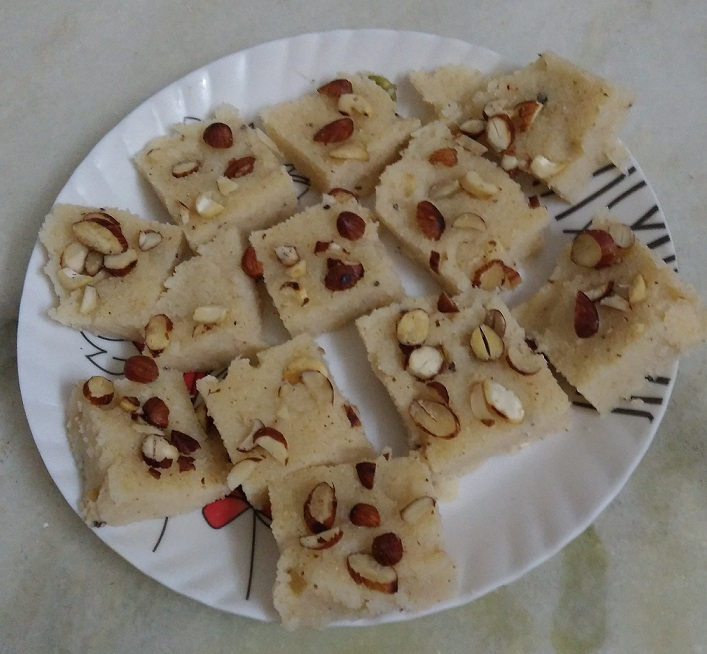
Odisha-style suji (semolina) barfi

== See also ==
- Fudge
