= Maida (flour) =

Type of wheat flour

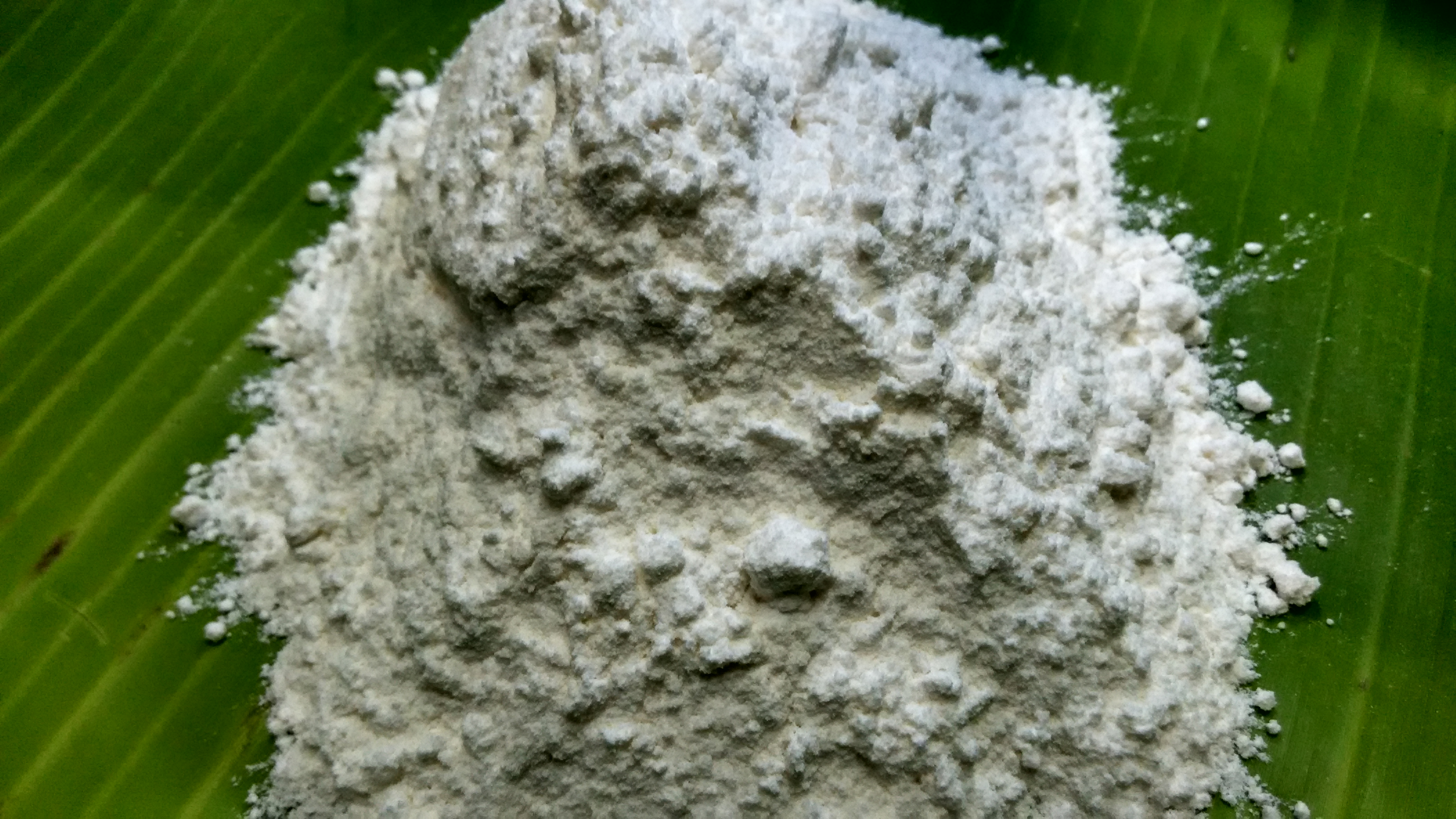
Maida flour

Maida (IPA: [mɛːd̪aː, mɐi̯d̪a]) is a type of wheat flour originated from the Indian subcontinent. It is a refined wheat flour used in Indian cuisine to make pastries and other bakery items like breads and biscuits. Some maida may have tapioca starch added.

== Production ==
Maida is made from the endosperm: the starchy white part of the grain. The bran is separated from the germ and endosperm which is then refined by passing through a sieve of 80 mesh per inch (31 mesh per centimeter). Although naturally yellowish due to pigments present in wheat, maida is typically bleached, either naturally due to atmospheric oxygen, or with any of a number of flour bleaching agents.

While it is milled from winter wheat that has a high gluten content, heat generated during the milling process results in denaturing of the protein, limiting its use in the preparation of leavened breads.

== Controversy ==
A common claim in the popular media is that maida contains alloxan, added as a bleaching agent or formed as a byproduct of bleaching. While it is a minor product of xanthophyll oxidation, there is no evidence that trace amounts of alloxan formed comprise a health risk.

== See also ==
- Atta
- Graham bread
- Semolina
- Jalebi
