= List of Pakistani sweets and desserts =

This is a list of desserts from Pakistani cuisine. Many different desserts exist in Pakistani cuisine.

== Pakistani desserts ==
Name	Image	Main ingredients	Description
Falooda		Ice cream, milk	A popular summer drink throughout Pakistan and the Middle East. It is often available at restaurants and beach stalls.
Karachi Halwa		Corn, milk	A confection similar to Turkish delight.
Kalakand		Milk, sugar	
Lab-e-Shireen			A traditional Pakistani custard-like dessert. It is often served during the month of Ramadan or during the days of Eid. It is served topped with vermicelli, cream, jelly, and fresh and dried fruits.
Laddu			
Firni/Kheer		Milk and rice flour based dessert.	
Gulab Jaman		Milk, khoya, saffron	It is a milk-solid sweet or a type of mithai mainly made from milk solids, traditionally khoya. It is also officially declared the national dessert of Pakistan by the Government of Pakistan.
Seviyan			
Shahi Tukra		Milk, sugar, spices, cardamom, saffron	
Sheer Khurma		Vermicelli, milk, dates, cashew nuts, cardamom, butter	
Shikanjabeen (Shikanjvi)			
Sohan Halwa		Corn flour, ghee, dry fruits	
Sohan Papdi/Patisa		Besan	Barfi
Suji ka halwa		Semolina, milk, ghee	
Ras malai		Cottage cheese	Made of cottage cheese balls (also known as chenna/paneer) soaked in a thickened, sweetened, and flavoured milk.
Baklava		Filo pastry	A type of filo pastry filled with finely chopped nuts and soaked in sharbat syrup.
Zarda		Sugar, candied fruit	Sweet dish of rice cooked in vegetable oil or butter, chopped candied fruitand/or dried fruit, nuts, and spices

== See also ==
- List of desserts
