= Lab-e-Shireen =

Pakistani Custard-like dessert

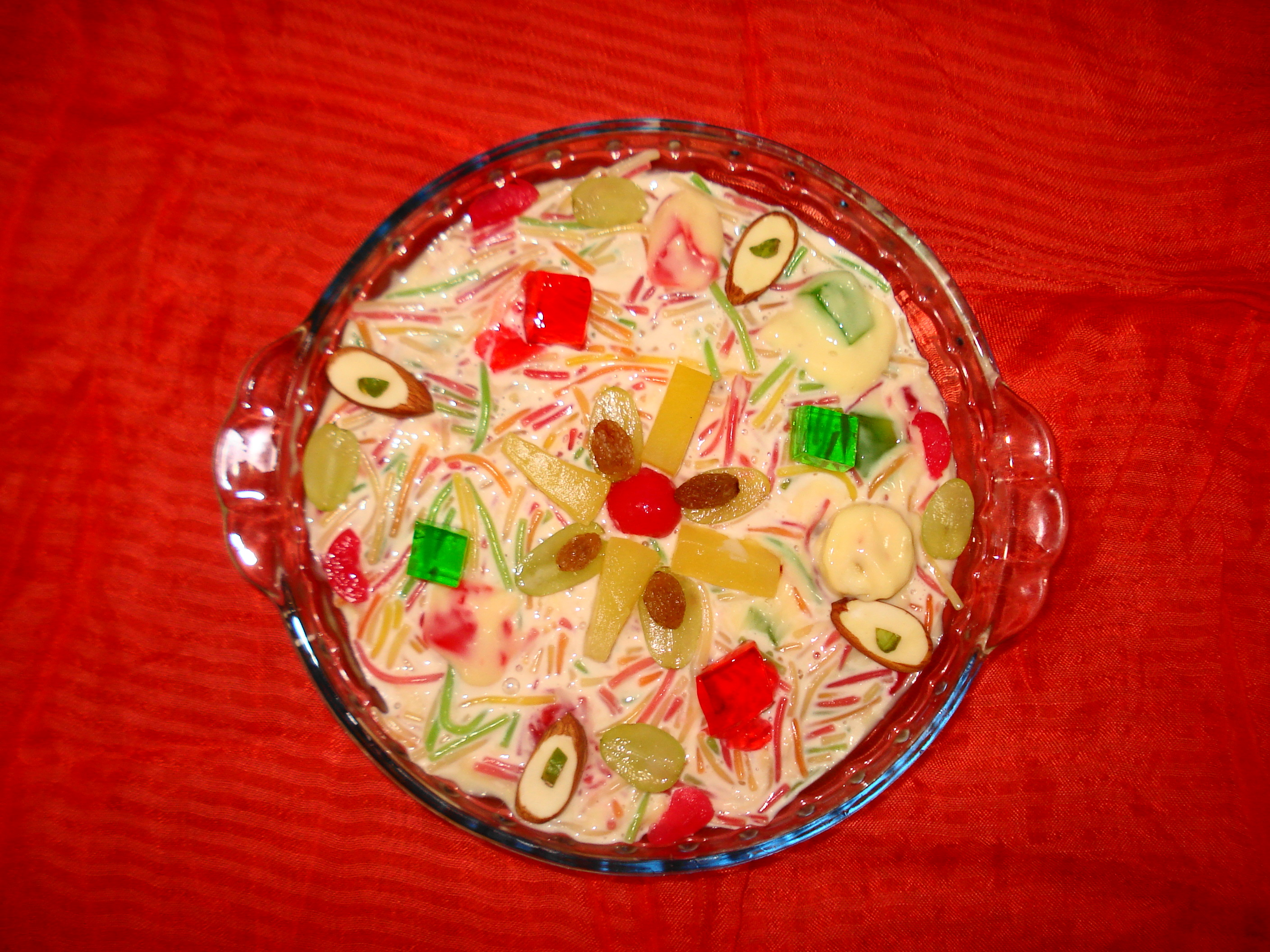
- Lab e Shireen dessert
- Type: custard
- Place of origin: Pakistan
- Main ingredients: vermicelli, cream, jelly, fruits, dried fruit

Lab-e-Shireen (Urdu: لبِ شیرین) is a traditional Pakistani custard-like dessert. It is often served during the month of Ramadan or during the days of Eid. It is served topped with vermicelli, cream, jelly, and fresh and dried fruits. Lab-e-Shireen is one of the most popular desserts in the modern cooking of Pakistan.

== Etymology ==
The name of the confectionery comes from two Persian and Urdu words, lab (لب), meaning "lips", and shireen (شیریں), meaning "sweet". The dish translates to "sweet lips" or "honeyed lips".

== History ==
It has recently been prepared in the past 5–10 years when the pasta industries of Pakistan begins to produce flavoured and coloured vermicelli.

== Ingredients ==
- Coloured vermicelli sugar
- Almonds
- Pistachio
- Raisin
- Milk
- Custard powder
- vanilla flavour
- Sugar
- Cream
- Rooh Afza Syrup (Red Syrup)
- Fruits
