= Dessert =

Sweet foods eaten at the end of a meal

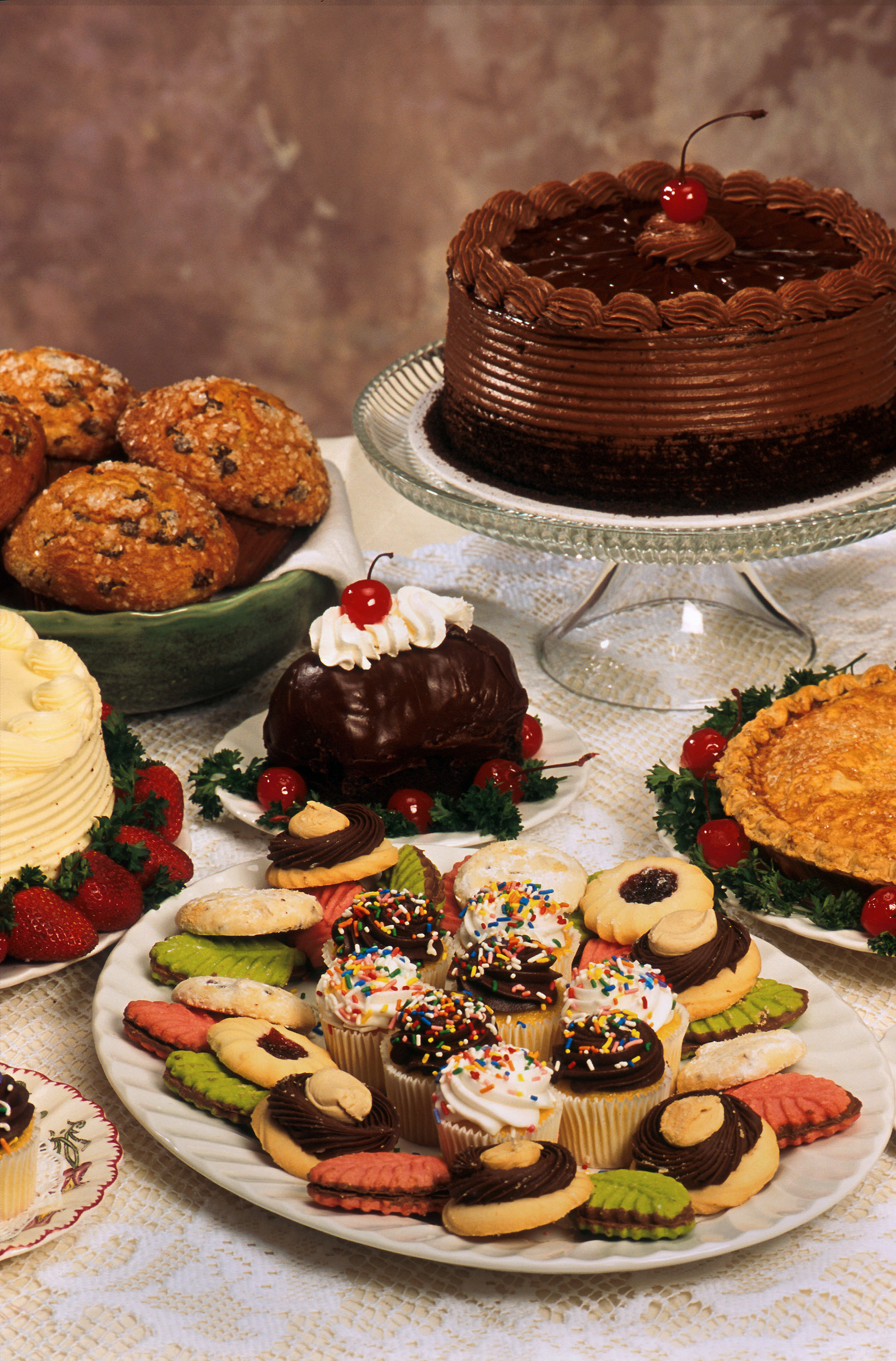
- Various desserts, including cakes, biscuits, and pies
- Type: Sweet
- Variations: Biscuits, cakes, tarts, cookies, sandeshs, jellies, ice creams, pastries, pies, puddings, custards, sweet soups, etc.

A dessert is a dish that consists of sweet foods, such as cake, biscuit, ice cream, or beverages, such as dessert wine, tong sui or milkshakes. Some cultures sweeten foods that are more commonly savory to create desserts. Desserts commonly conclude a meal as a course in many restaurants, while in some parts of the world, there is no tradition of a dessert course to conclude a meal.

Historically, the dessert course consisted entirely of foods 'from the storeroom' (de l'office), including fresh, stewed, preserved, and dried fruits; nuts; cheese and other dairy dishes; dry biscuits (cookies) and wafers; and ices and ice creams. Sweet dishes from the kitchen, such as freshly prepared pastries, meringues, custards, puddings, and baked fruits, were served in the entremets course, not in the dessert course. By the 20th century, though, sweet entremets had come to be included among the desserts.

== Etymology ==
The term "dessert" originated from the French word desservir, meaning "to clear the table", (Note: "dessert". Trésor de la langue française informatisé. "dessert". Oxford English Dictionary (online ed.). Oxford University Press. (Subscription or participating institution membership required.) "Dessert". Merriam-Webster Dictionary. Merriam-Webster Incorporated. Archived from the original on 27 February 2021.) and it referred to the final course of the meal, presented after the table was "cleared" (deservi).

One of the earliest uses of the term in a culinary context is in the Ménagier de Paris (1393), which includes a course of "desserte" in three of the menus, (Note: The word "menus" appropriately describes this section of the Petit traicté, but the first appearance of "menu" with that culinary meaning is in the much later Nouveau Dictionnaire de l'Académie françoise, 1718, p. II:50.) one of which includes sweet pastries and fruits, another of which includes savory frumenty and venison.

In later centuries, the term continued to refer to the last course of the meal. In the late 19th century, the word "desserts" also came to refer to the dishes served in the dessert course.

== Other names ==
The word "dessert" is most commonly used for this course in Australia, Canada, Ireland, New Zealand, and the United States, while its use exists alongside several synonyms, such as "pudding", "sweets" and "afters" in the United Kingdom and some other Commonwealth countries.

== History ==
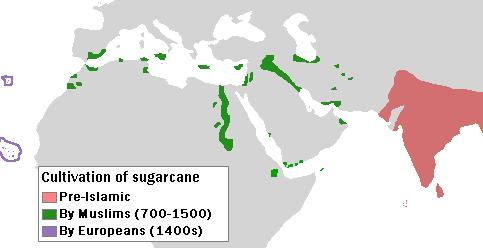
The spread of sugarcane from ancient India to the world

Sweets were fed to the gods in ancient Mesopotamia and ancient India and other ancient civilizations. Herodotus mentions that Persian meals featured many desserts, and were more varied in their sweet offerings than the main dishes. German army officer Helmuth von Moltke whilst serving in the Ottoman Empire noted the unusual presentation of courses with the sweet courses served between roasts and other savory dishes.

Dried fruit and honey were probably the first sweeteners used in most of the world, but the spread of sugarcane around the world was essential to the development of dessert. Sugarcane was grown and refined in India before 500 BC and was crystallized, making it easy to transport, by 500 CE. Sugar and sugarcane were traded, making sugar available to Macedonia by 303 BC and China by 600 CE. In the Indian subcontinent, the Middle East, and China, sugar has been a staple of cooking and desserts for over a thousand years.

Sugarcane and sugar were little known and rare in Europe until the twelfth century or later when the Crusades and then colonization spread its use. Europeans began to manufacture sugar in the Middle Ages, and more sweet desserts became available. Even then sugar was so expensive usually only the wealthy could indulge on special occasions. The first apple pie recipe was published in 1381; The earliest documentation of the term cupcake was in "Seventy-five Receipts for Pastry, Cakes, and Sweetmeats" in 1828 in Eliza Leslie's Receipts cookbook.

The Industrial Revolution in Europe and later America led to the mass-production of foodstuffs, including desserts, that could be processed, preserved, canned, and packaged. Frozen foods, including desserts, became very popular starting in the 1920s.

The broader amount of refined sugar and flour also helped with establishing elaborate desserts as a prominent feature in European court banquets in the 18th and 19th centuries. Tables could have creams, tarts, fruit, cakes, pastries, puddings, jellies, and meringues, usually shown to emphasize wealth and technicall skill.

== Ingredients ==
Sweet desserts usually contain cane sugar, palm sugar, brown sugar, honey, or some types of syrup such as molasses, maple syrup, treacle, or corn syrup. Other common ingredients in Western-style desserts are flour or other starches, cooking fats such as butter or lard, dairy, eggs, salt, acidic ingredients such as lemon juice, and spices and other flavoring agents such as chocolate, coffee, peanut butter, fruits, and nuts. The proportions of these ingredients, along with the preparation methods, play a major part in the consistency, texture, and flavor of the end product.

Sugars contribute moisture and tenderness to baked goods. Flour or starch components serves as a protein and gives the dessert structure. Fats contribute moisture and can enable the development of flaky layers in pastries and pie crusts. The dairy products in baked goods keep the desserts moist. Many desserts also contain eggs, in order to form custard or to aid in the rising and thickening of a cake-like substance. Egg yolks specifically contribute to the richness of desserts. Egg whites can act as a leavening agent or provide structure.

Desserts can contain many spices and extracts to add a variety of flavors. Salt and acids are added to desserts to balance sweet flavors and create a contrast in flavors. Some desserts are coffee-flavored, for example an iced coffee soufflé or coffee biscuits. Alcohols and liqueurs can also be used as an ingredient, to make alcoholic desserts.

== Varieties and elements ==
Desserts consist of variations of tastes, textures, and appearances. Desserts can be defined as a usually sweeter course that concludes a meal. This definition includes a range of courses ranging from fruits or dried nuts to multi-ingredient cakes and pies. Many cultures have different variations of dessert. In modern times the variations of desserts have usually been passed down or come from geographical regions. This is one cause for the variation of desserts. These are some major categories in which desserts can be placed.

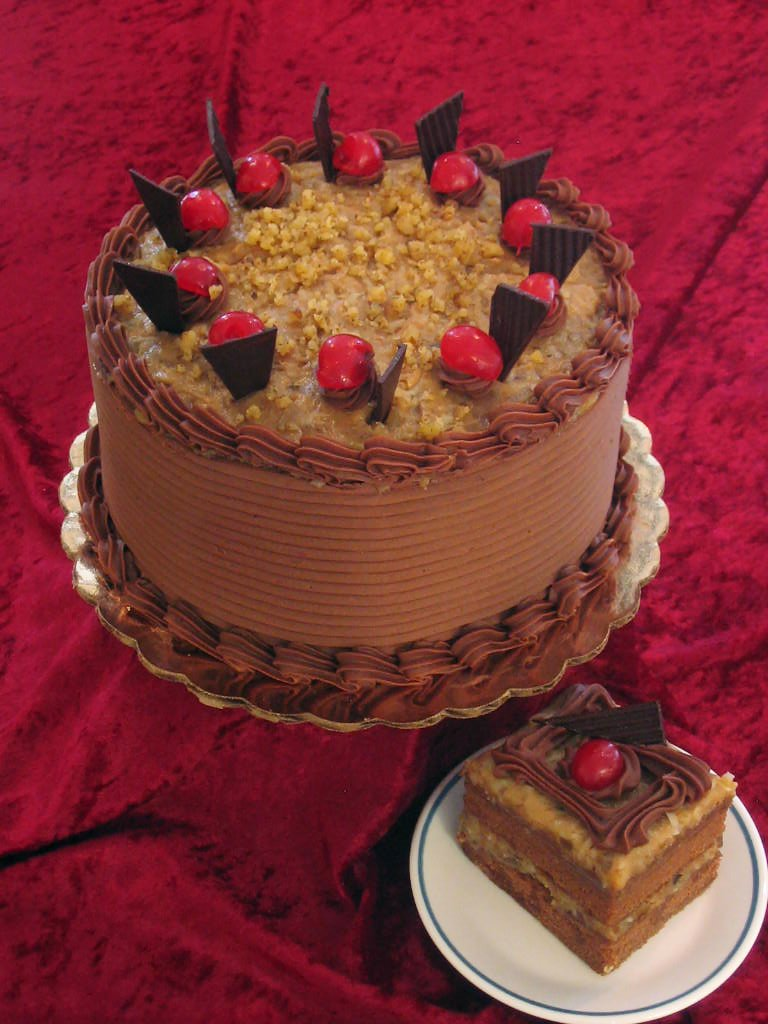
German chocolate cake, a layered cake filled and topped with a coconut-pecan frosting

=== Cakes ===
Cakes are sweet tender breads made with sugar and delicate flour. Cakes can vary from light, airy sponge cakes to dense cakes with less flour. Common flavorings include dried, candied or fresh fruit, nuts, cocoa or extracts. They may be filled with fruit preserves or dessert sauces (like pastry cream), iced with buttercream or other icings, and decorated with marzipan, piped borders, or candied fruit. Cake is often served as a celebratory dish on ceremonial occasions, for example weddings, anniversaries, and birthdays. Small-sized cakes have become popular, in the form of cupcakes and petits fours, an example of which can be the Portuguese "bolo de arroz".

=== Puddings ===
Puddings are similar to custards in that their base is cream or milk. However, their primary difference is that puddings are thickened with starches such as corn starch or tapioca. On the other hand, custards are thickened using only eggs and are usually more firm.

=== Small cakes and pastries ===
Biscuits or cookies are small disks of sweetened dough, similar in composition to a cake. The term "biscuit" is a derivation of Latin for twice-baked, (Note: See, for example, Shakespeare's use of "Twice-sod simplicity! Bis coctus!" in Love's Labour's Lost, IV.ii.22.) while the term "cookie" is a Dutch diminutive for koek, meaning cake. Some examples of this dessert include a ginger nut, shortbread biscuit and chocolate chip cookie. In Commonwealth English, the term "biscuit" refers to this type of dessert in general, with "cookie" reserved for a specific type of drop cookie; in North America, the term "cookie" typically refers to all forms of this dessert, with "biscuit" more commonly referring to a type of bread.

Other small cakes and pastries can also be counted as under these terms, due to their size and relative similarity to cookies and biscuits, such as jaffa cakes and Eccles cakes.

=== Confection ===
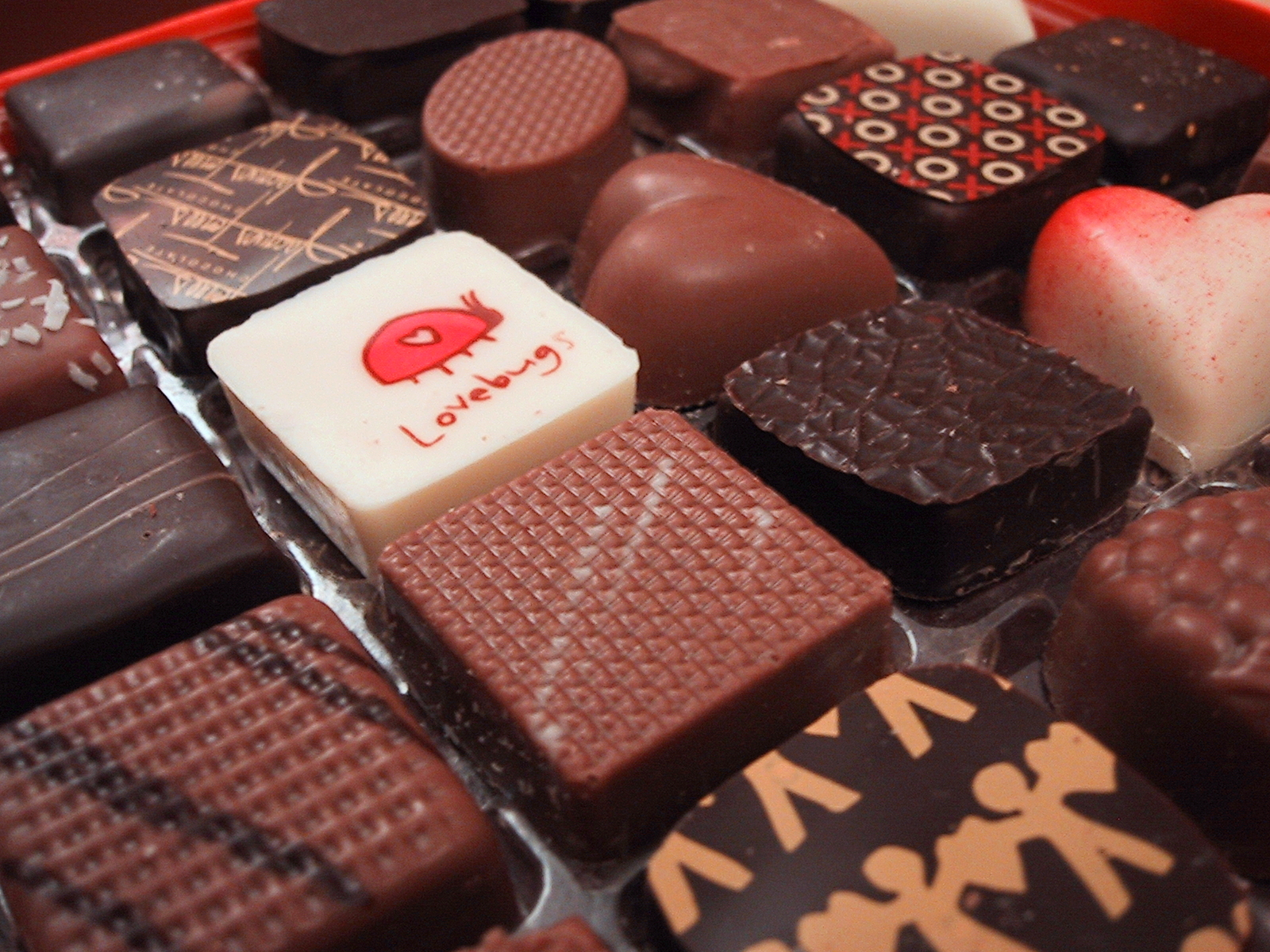
Valentine's Day chocolates

Confection, also called candy, sweets or lollies, features sugar or honey as a principal ingredient.

Many involve sugar heated into crystals with subtle differences. Dairy and sugar based include caramel, fudge and toffee or taffy. There are multiple forms of egg and sugar meringues and similar confections. Unheated sugar dissolves into icings, preservatives and sauces with other ingredients.

Before refined sugar became so available, honey was typically added to sweeten confections with fruit, nuts, herbs, and spices. Sugar based candy production later expanded in Europe, and these confectionary later became more and more mechanized from the late 18th century.

==== Chocolate ====
Theobroma cacao beans are commonly mixed with sugar to form chocolate. Pure, unsweetened dark chocolate contains primarily cocoa solids. Cocoa butter is also added in varying proportions. Much of the chocolate currently consumed is in the form of sweet chocolate, combining chocolate with sugar. Milk chocolate is sweet chocolate that additionally contains milk powder or condensed milk. White chocolate contains cocoa butter, sugar, and milk, but no cocoa solids. Dark chocolate is produced by adding fat and sugar to the cacao mixture, with no milk or much less than milk chocolate. Beyond consuming chocolate on its own, it is also an ingredient commonly used in many desserts such as brownies.

=== Custards ===
These kinds of desserts usually include a thickened dairy base. Custards are cooked and thickened with eggs. Baked custards include crème brûlée and flan. They are often used as ingredients in other desserts, for instance as a filling for pastries or pies.

Custards can also be served soft like found in crème anglaise, or can be served firmly by baking or chilling. Their texture depends on the controlled heating of eggs and diary, because expressive heat can cause the proteins to overcoagulate and create a curdled texture.

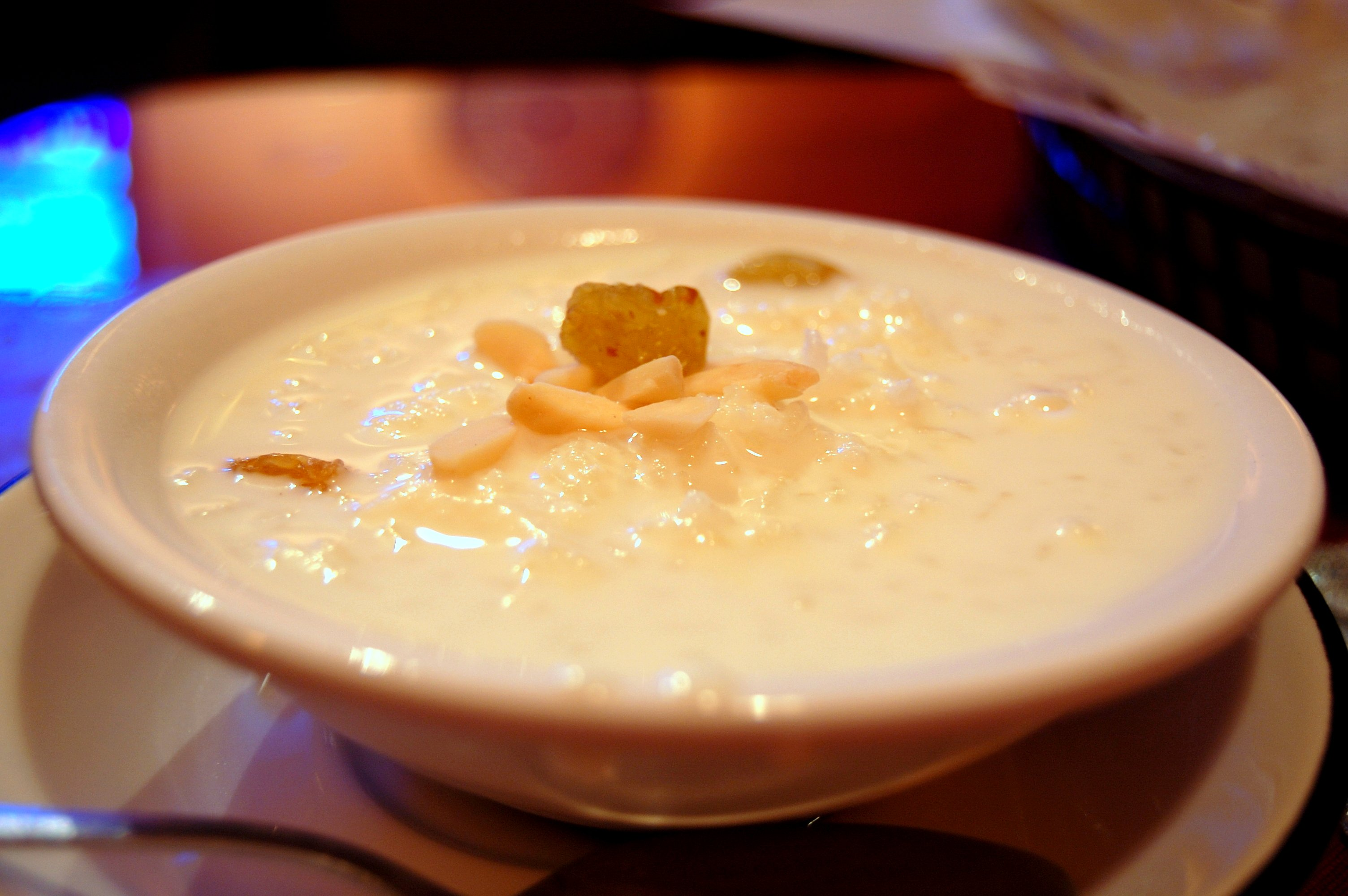
Kheer

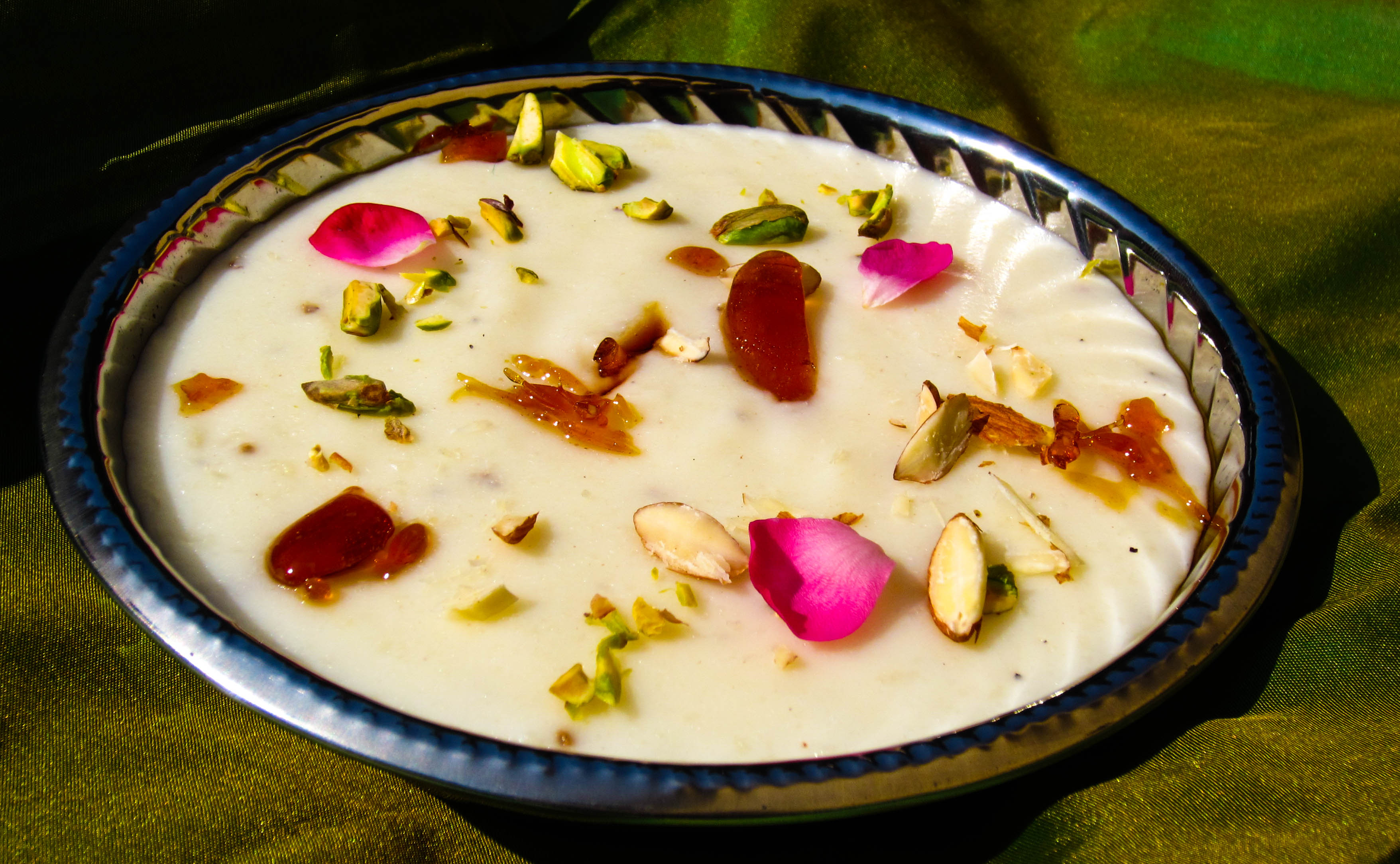
Phirni

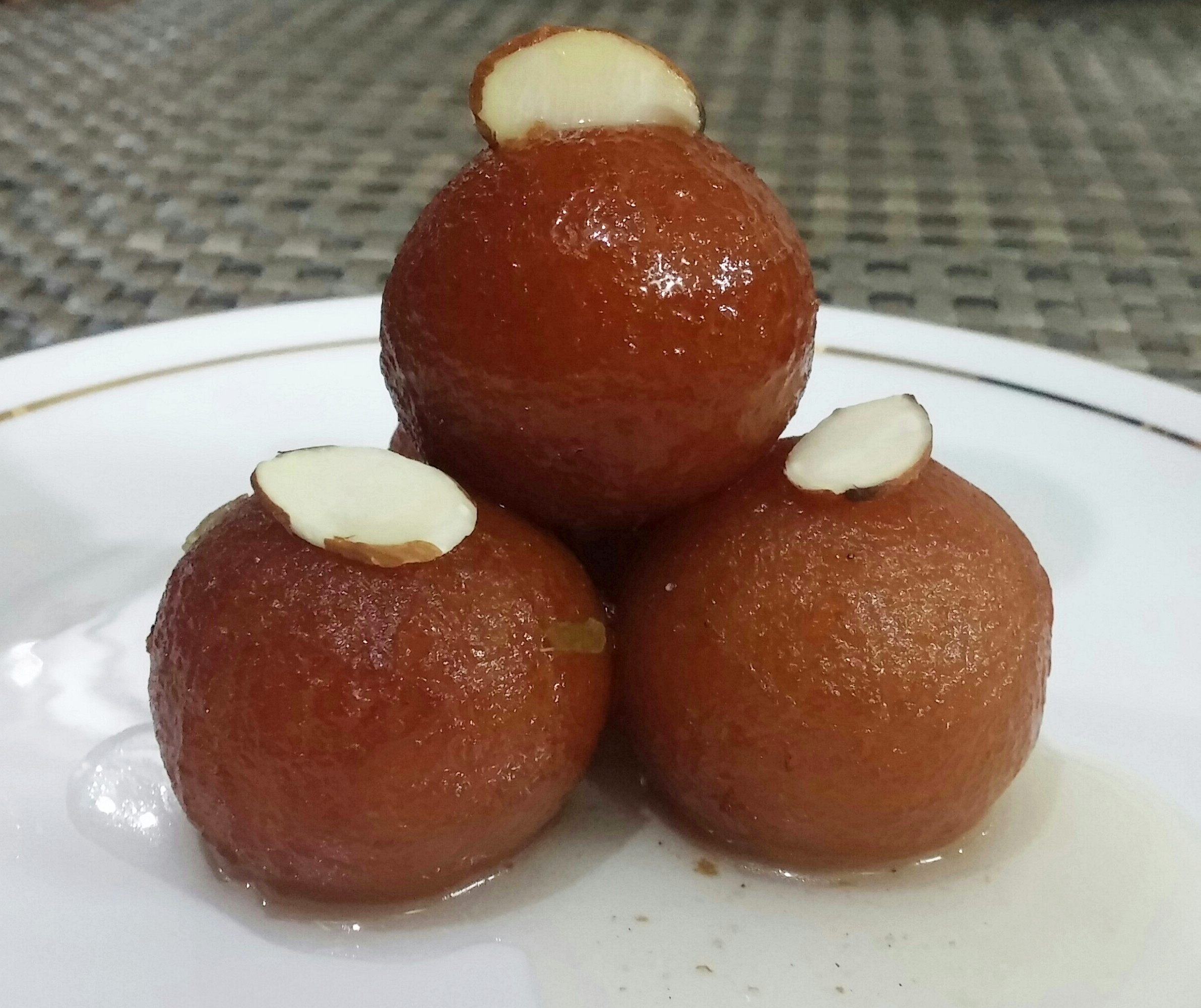
Gulab jamun topped with almond slivers

=== Deep-fried ===
Many cuisines include a dessert made of deep-fried starch-based batter or dough. In many countries, a doughnut is a flour-based batter that has been deep-fried. It is sometimes filled with custard or jelly. Fritters are fruit pieces in a thick batter that have been deep fried. Frying quickly creates a browned outer layer while keeping the interior soft. After, many desserts are finished with sugar, syrup, honey, or a sweet filling.

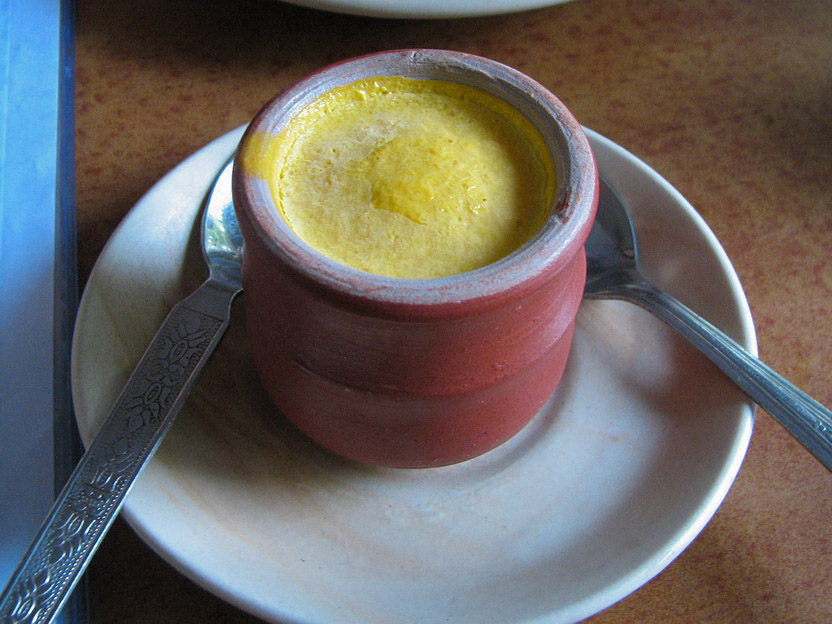
Kulfi inside a matka pot from India

=== Frozen ===
Frozen desserts are desserts that are stored cold. Ice cream is a cream base that is churned as it is frozen to create a creamy consistency. Gelato uses a milk base and has less air whipped in than ice cream, making it denser. Sorbet is made from churned fruit and is not dairy based.

=== Gelatin ===
Jellied desserts are made with a sweetened liquid thickened with gelatin or another gelling agent. They are traditional in many cultures. Yōkan is a Japanese jellied dessert. In English-speaking countries, many dessert recipes are based on gelatin with fruit or whipped cream added. Marshmallows are also most commonly made with gelatin. Gelatin itself is not vegan, as it uses collagen from animal parts. In vegan recipes, gelatin can be substituted with tapioca, agar, pectin, and other plant based alternatives.

=== Hybrid desserts ===
Hybrid desserts are desserts that combine aspects and ingredients of two or more desserts to create a different, new dessert. They can be made in a variety of different ways, some involve mixing separate batters and doughs together at some point in the baking process. Others have batters or doughs from one dessert baked, cooked, or fried like another dessert would be. Some hybrid desserts use both of these methods.

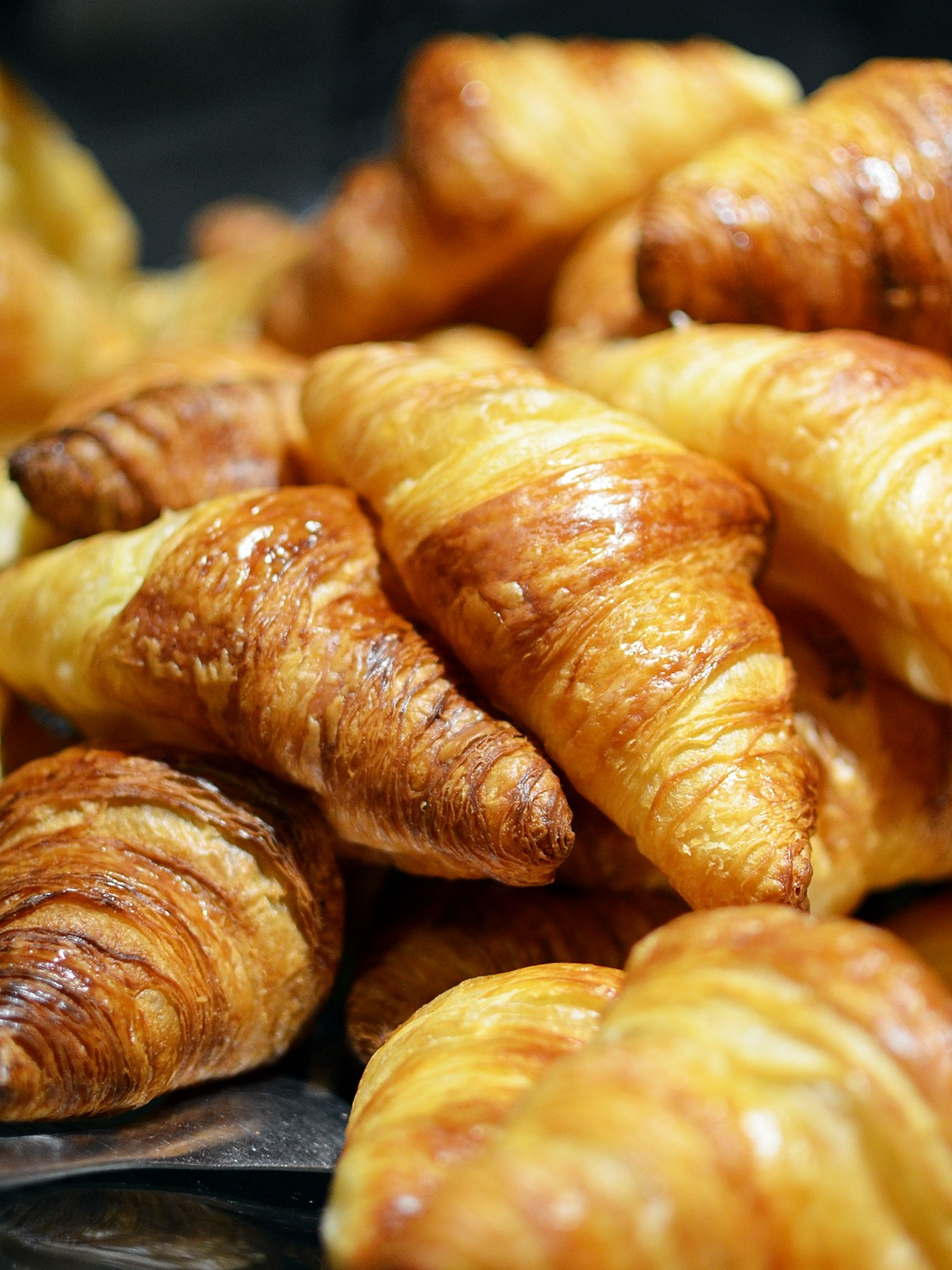
Croissants au beurre

=== Pastries ===
Pastries are sweet baked desserts made from pastry doughs. Pastry doughs are made differently depending on amounts of flours, fat content, liquids, and other factors. Pastry doughs can be laminated or Non-laminated. Laminated doughs are doughs that have many folds, or sheets with fat in between. Non-laminated doughs are doughs that contain fat that is added to the dough mix, solid or melted. There are many types of laminated doughs such as flaky, puff, or phyllo. Types of non-laminated doughs include shortcrust, or choux.

=== Sweet soups ===
Tong sui, or "sugar water", is a collective term for any sweet, warm soup or custard served in Chinese cuisine. Tong sui is a Cantonese dish that is made with sugars, seeds, fruits, and beans and it is typically served at a lukewarm temperature.

=== Wines ===
Dessert wines are sweet wines typically served with dessert. There is no simple definition of a dessert wine. In the UK, a dessert wine is considered to be any sweet wine drunk with a meal, as opposed to the white fortified wines (fino and amontillado sherry) drunk before the meal, and the red fortified wines (port and madeira) drunk after it. Thus, most fortified wines are regarded as distinct from dessert wines, but some of the less strong fortified white wines, such as Pedro Ximénez sherry and Muscat de Beaumes-de-Venise, are regarded as honorary dessert wines. In the United States, by contrast, a dessert wine is legally defined as any wine over 14% alcohol by volume, which includes all fortified wines - and is taxed at higher rates as a result. Examples include Sauternes and Tokaji Aszú.

== By region ==
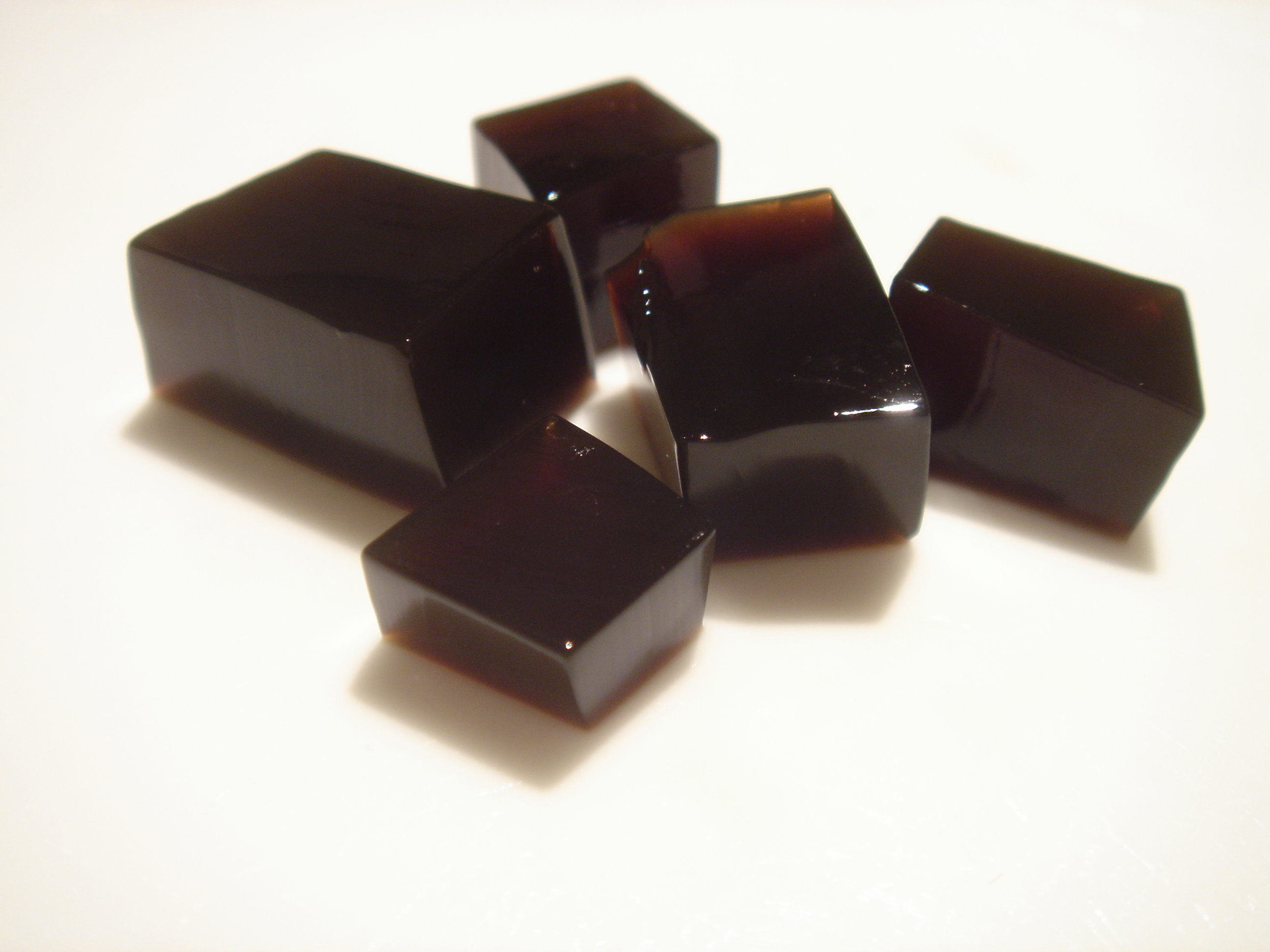
Grass jelly is a jelly-like dessert eaten in several Asian countries.

=== Africa ===
==== Northern Africa ====
Basbousa is an Egyptian dessert that is popular across Northern Africa and other Mediterranean countries. Basbousa is a syrup soaked cake sometimes flavored with vanilla or coconut. Chebakia is a Moroccan dessert that is designed to look like a flower. Chebakia is often flavored with cinnamon, sesame or saffron and is deep fried and coated in honey and orange flower water.

==== Western Africa ====
Thiakry is a pudding made from millet and couscous, and it is a popular dessert in Senegal and The Gambia. In Nigeria, caramelized coconut candy is a popular sweet. The Liberian sweet potato pone is a Liberian cake made from grated sweet potatoes, among other ingredients.

==== Central Africa ====
In Central Africa, desserts are commonly not a part of a meal, rather fruits are eaten instead. In some countries that were formerly colonized, desserts are inspired by the metropole. In Angola, cocada amarela is a popular coconut and egg yolk based dish, which shares resemblance with Portuguese cuisine. Moelleux au chocolat amande is a popular Cameroonian dessert made from chocolate sponge and almonds.

==== Eastern Africa ====
In Ethiopia, kolo is a popular dessert made with peanuts and roasted barley. Teff cake is popular in Ethiopia as well. Teff cake is made from teff, and is often flavored with honey and cardamon. Halwa is a confection that is popular in many parts of Africa it is made from semolina, and is sometimes flavored with rose water or cardamon.

==== Southern Africa ====
In South Africa, melkterts are a popular dessert. Melkterts are made with a pastry crust and have a cream filling. Malva pudding is a popular dessert in South Africa and Botswana. Malva pudding is an apricot flavored pudding that is made with butter, egg yolks and apricot jam.

=== Asia ===
==== Eastern Asia ====
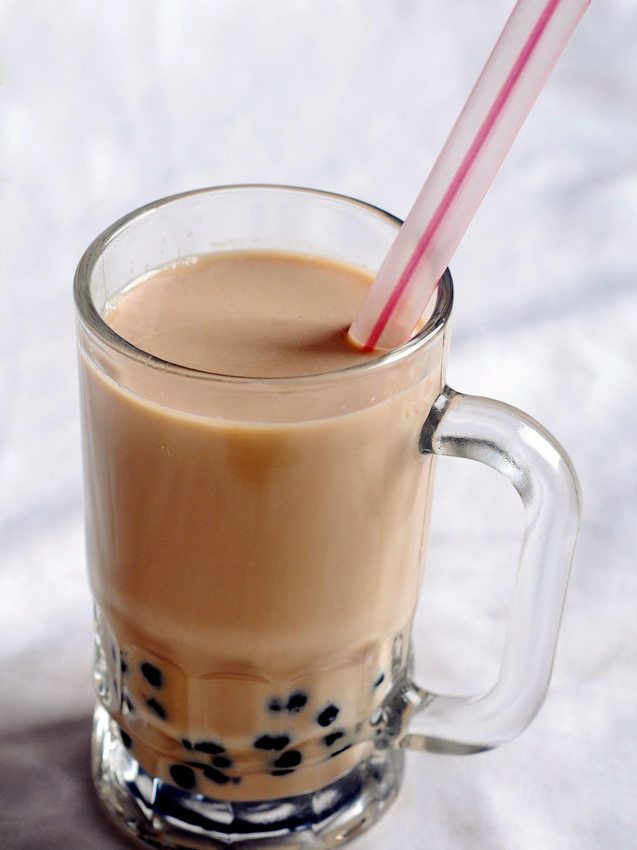
Bubble tea is famous for its varieties of flavors with bubbles and jellies.

In Asia, desserts are often eaten between meals as snacks rather than as a concluding course. There is widespread use of rice flour in East Asian desserts, which often include local ingredients such as coconut milk, palm sugar, and tropical fruit.

==== India ====
In India, where sugarcane has been grown and refined since before 1000 BC, desserts have been an important part of the diet for thousands of years; types of desserts include burfis, halvahs, jalebis, and laddus.

==== Middle East ====
Traditional Middle Eastern deserts as documented in medieval sources, were rich confections frequently prepared with saffron, rose water, honey, dates, figs, and pomegranates. These sweets were served at the courts of caliphs and the elite, reflecting the refined culinary culture of the medieval Islamic world.

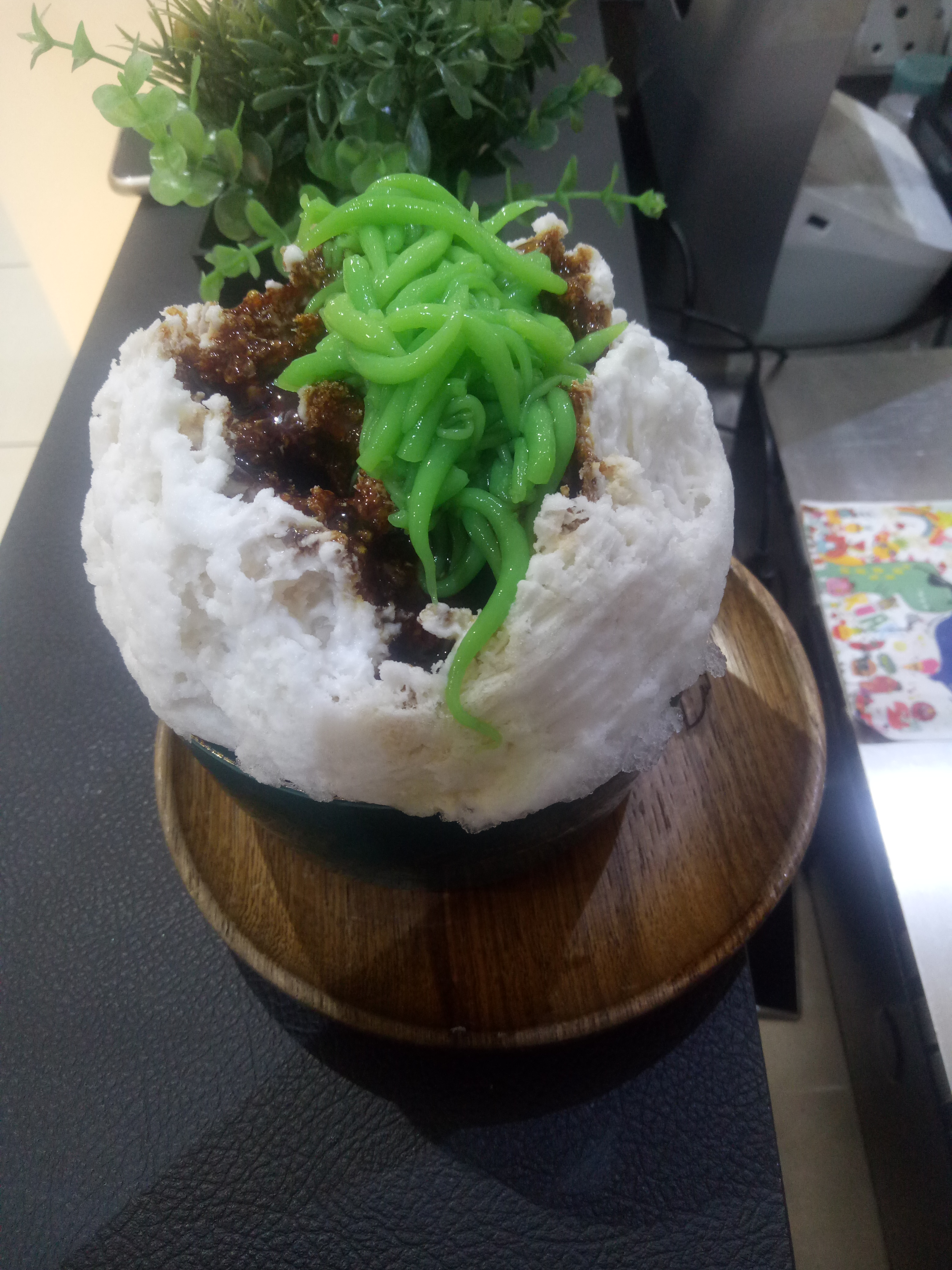
Cendol Akaka in Malaysia

=== Europe ===
==== Balkans ====
Galaktoboureko is a custard filled pie that is popular in Greece. Baklava is a dessert that is popular in a large portion of the Balkans. Baklava is made using phylo dough, and can include nuts or fruits inside of it. Baklava is also a popular dessert in other regions, such as the Middle East, India and parts of Africa. Tufahije is another dessert popular in the Balkans. It is a dessert made with poached apples.

==== Dutch ====
In the Netherlands, vla is a popular dessert. It is a custard-like dessert that is served cold. Popular flavors are: vanilla, chocolate, caramel, and several fruit flavors. Hopjes, which is coffee and caramel sweet dessert, is also a popular dessert in the Netherlands.

==== East Slavs ====
Pastila is a popular Russian dessert that is popular in Russia and Ukraine. It is a marshmallow-like confection made from pureed fruit, and a gelling agent. It is most commonly made using apple puree. In the Eastern Slavs, kulich bread is a popular dessert served commonly at Easter time. Kulich bread is a Russian cake that is sometimes served glazed or with fruits.

==== France ====
In France, pastries with leavened and unleavened dough are popular, like croissants or pain au chocolat. These pastries are often made with flavored cream or custard inside. Desserts can also be based on creams and custards custards, like crème brûlée, mousse, or soufflés. Small cakes or cookies are also popular in french desserts, such as macarons, or moelleux au chocolator. Tart based desserts are also common in France.

==== Italy ====
In Italy, tiramisu is a popular dessert it is made with mascarpone layered with coffee flavored ladyfingers, typically chilled and covered with cocoa powder. Another popular dessert is gelato, an ice cream-like frozen dish made with a milk base and egg yolk. cannolis are also a popular dessert in Italy. Cannolis are made with a tube-shaped shell and filled with ricotta, which can sometimes be flavored differently. Cannolis and also include fruit, nuts and chocolate.

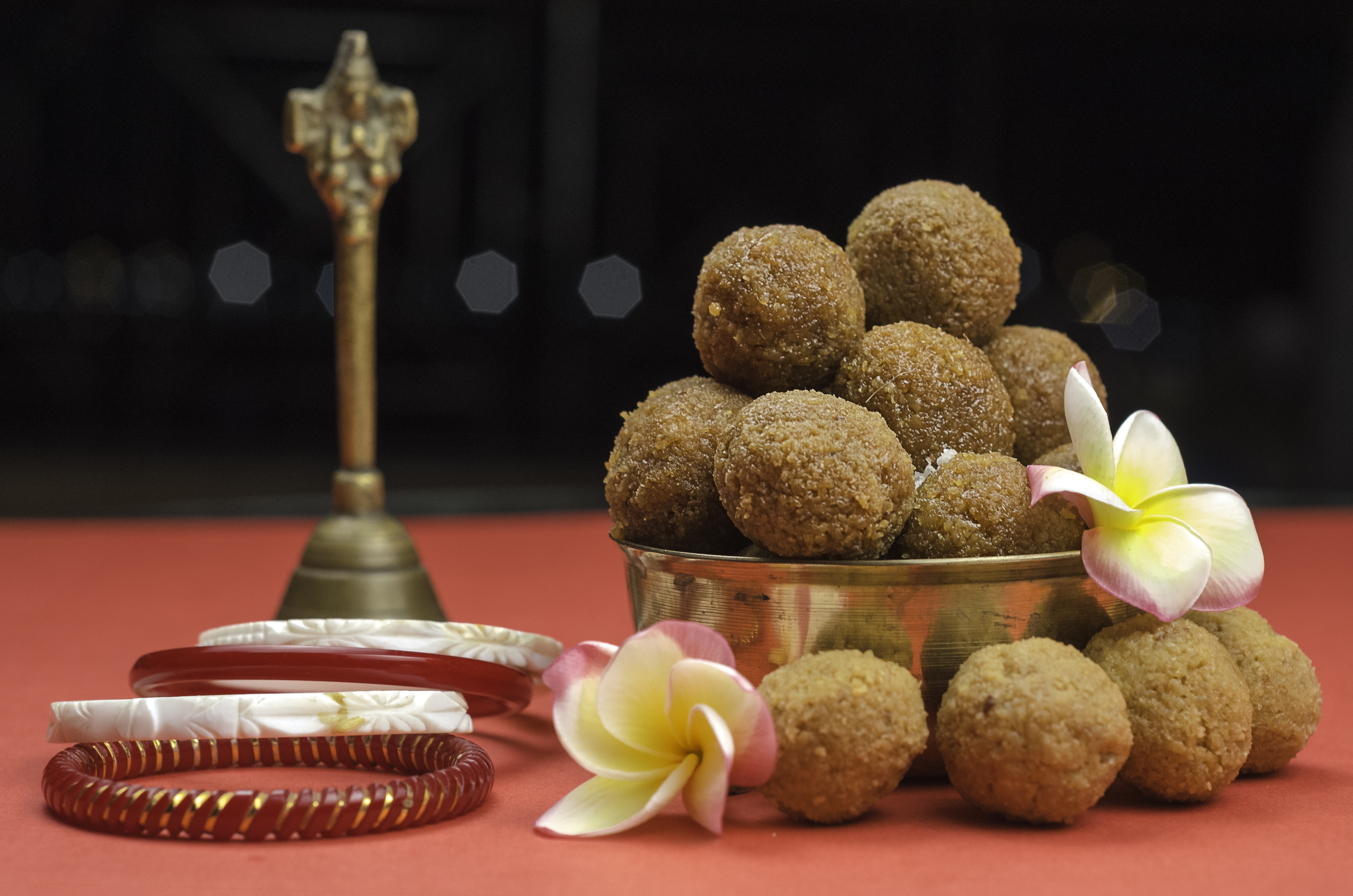
Laddu is often served on Indian festivals such as Raksha Bandhan and Diwali.

=== North America ===
==== Mexico ====
In Mexico, flans are a popular custard dessert. Flans are also popular in other Spanish-speaking countries such as Spain and parts of Latin America. Pan dulce (Or "Sweet bread") is also popular in Mexico. Pan dulce is a general term for a large variety of Mexican baked goods and pastries.

==== United States ====
Various flavors cakes, pies, and ice creams are popular dishes in the United States. Ice cream is sometimes eaten alongside or on top cakes and pies. Smaller Desserts are commonly eaten as well, such as cookies, brownies, or rice krispies teats.

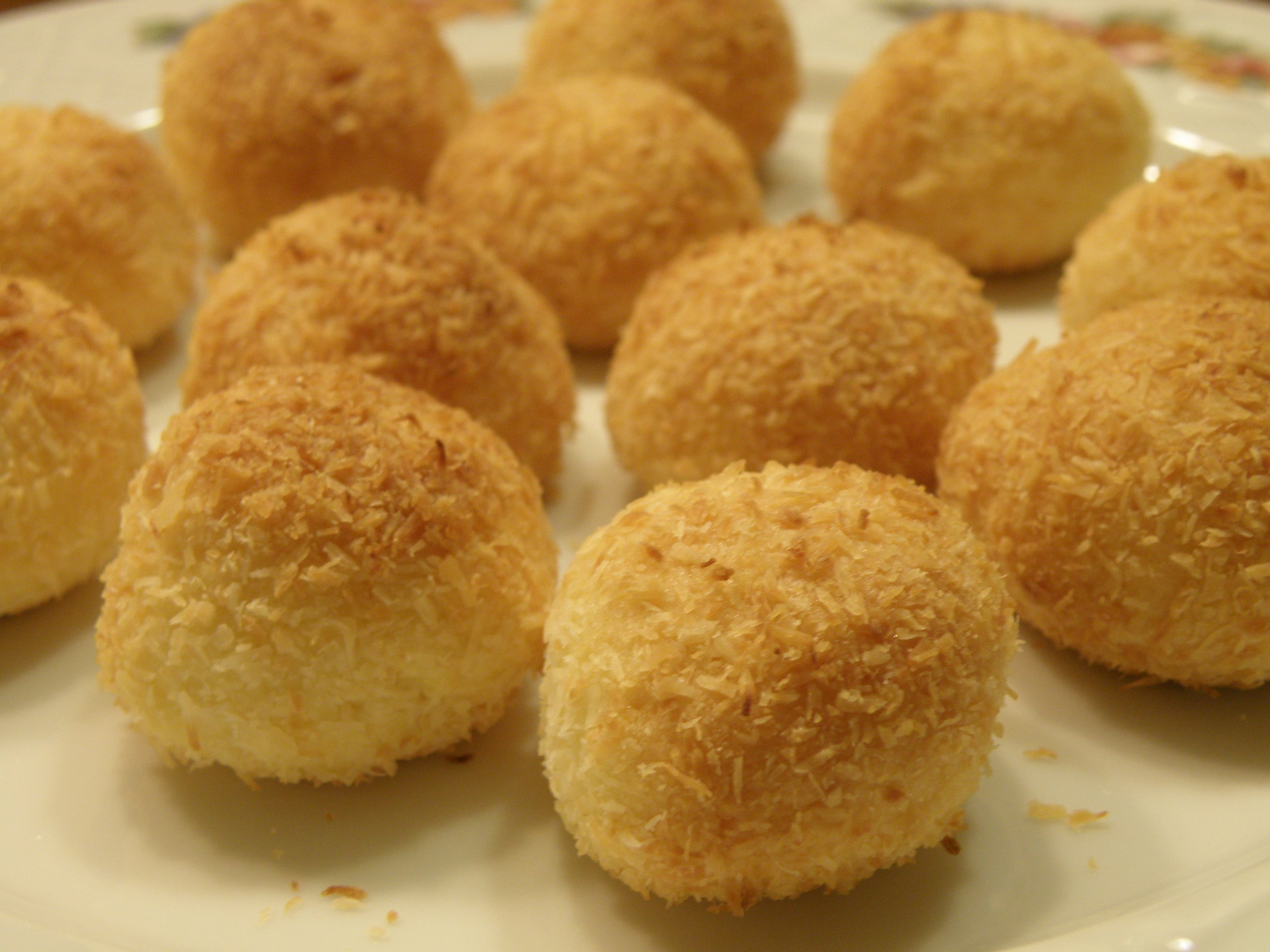
Cocadas are a traditional coconut candy or confectionery found in many parts of Latin America, made with eggs and shredded coconut.

=== South America ===
==== Argentina ====
Dulce de leche is a very common confection in Argentina.

==== Bolivia ====
In Bolivia, sugarcane, honey and coconut are traditionally used in desserts. Tawa tawa is a Bolivian sweet fritter prepared using sugar cane, and helado de canela is a dessert that is similar to sherbet which is prepared with cane sugar and cinnamon. Coconut tarts, puddings cookies and candies are also consumed in Bolivia.

==== Brazil ====
Brazil has a variety of candies such as brigadeiros (chocolate fudge balls), cocada (a coconut sweet), beijinhos (coconut truffles and clove) and Romeu e Julieta (cheese with a guava jam known as goiabada). Peanuts are used to make paçoca, rapadura and pé-de-moleque. Local common fruits are turned in juices and used to make chocolates, ice pops and ice cream.

==== Chile ====
In Chile, kuchen has been described as a "trademark dessert". Several desserts in Chile are prepared with manjar, (caramelized milk), including alfajor, flan, cuchufli and arroz con leche.

==== Columbia ====
Desserts consumed in Colombia include dulce de leche, waffle cookies, puddings, nougat, coconut with syrup and thickened milk with sugarcane syrup.

==== Ecuador ====
Desserts in Ecuador tend to be simple, and desserts are a moderate part of the cuisine. Desserts consumed in Ecuador include tres leches cake, flan, candies and various sweets.

=== Oceania ===
==== Australia and New Zealand ====
The pavlova is a meringue based dessert with an made with assortment of fruits. Both Australia and New Zealand claim to have invented the pavlova. The lamington is an Australian cake made from sponge or butter cake, dipped in chocolate or coconut. The lamington is popular in both Australia and New Zealand.

== Market ==
The market for desserts has grown over the last few decades, being greatly increased by the commercialization of baking desserts and the rise of food productions. Desserts are served in most restaurants as their popularity has increased. Many commercial stores have been established as solely dessert stores. Ice cream parlors have been around since before 1800. Many businesses have started advertising campaigns focusing solely on desserts. The tactics used to market desserts are very different depending on the audience; for example, desserts can be advertised with popular movie characters to target children. The rise of companies such as Food Network has produced many shows which feature desserts and their creation. Shows like these have displayed extreme desserts and made a game show atmosphere to make desserts a more competitive field.

Desserts are a standard staple in restaurant menus, with different degrees of variety. Pie and cheesecake were among the most popular dessert courses ordered in U.S. restaurants in 2012.

== Nutrition ==
Dessert foods often contain relatively high amounts of sugar and fats and, as a result, higher calorie counts per gram than other foods. Fresh or cooked fruit with minimal added sugar or fat is an exception.

== Gallery ==
Dessert examples

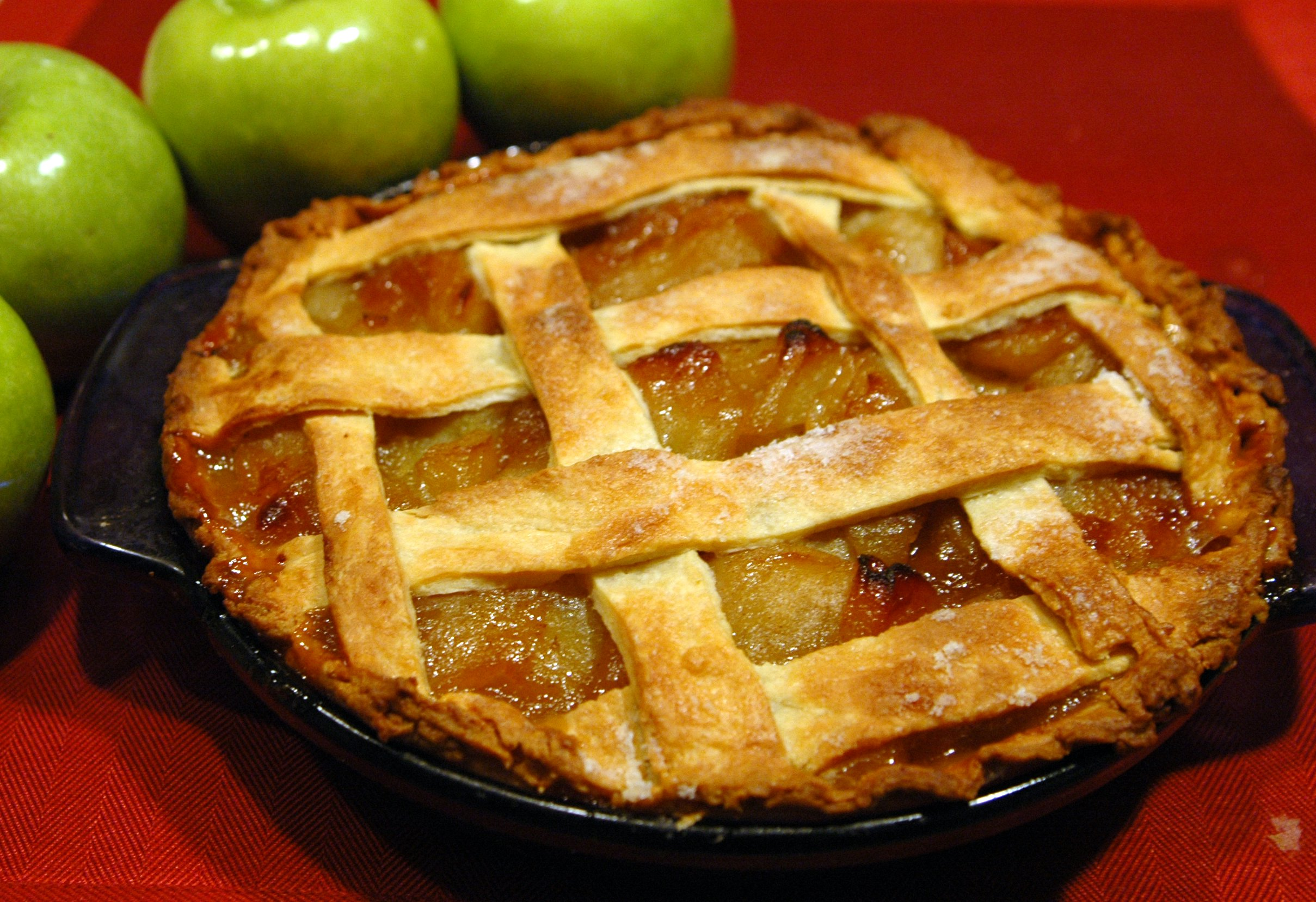
Apple pie

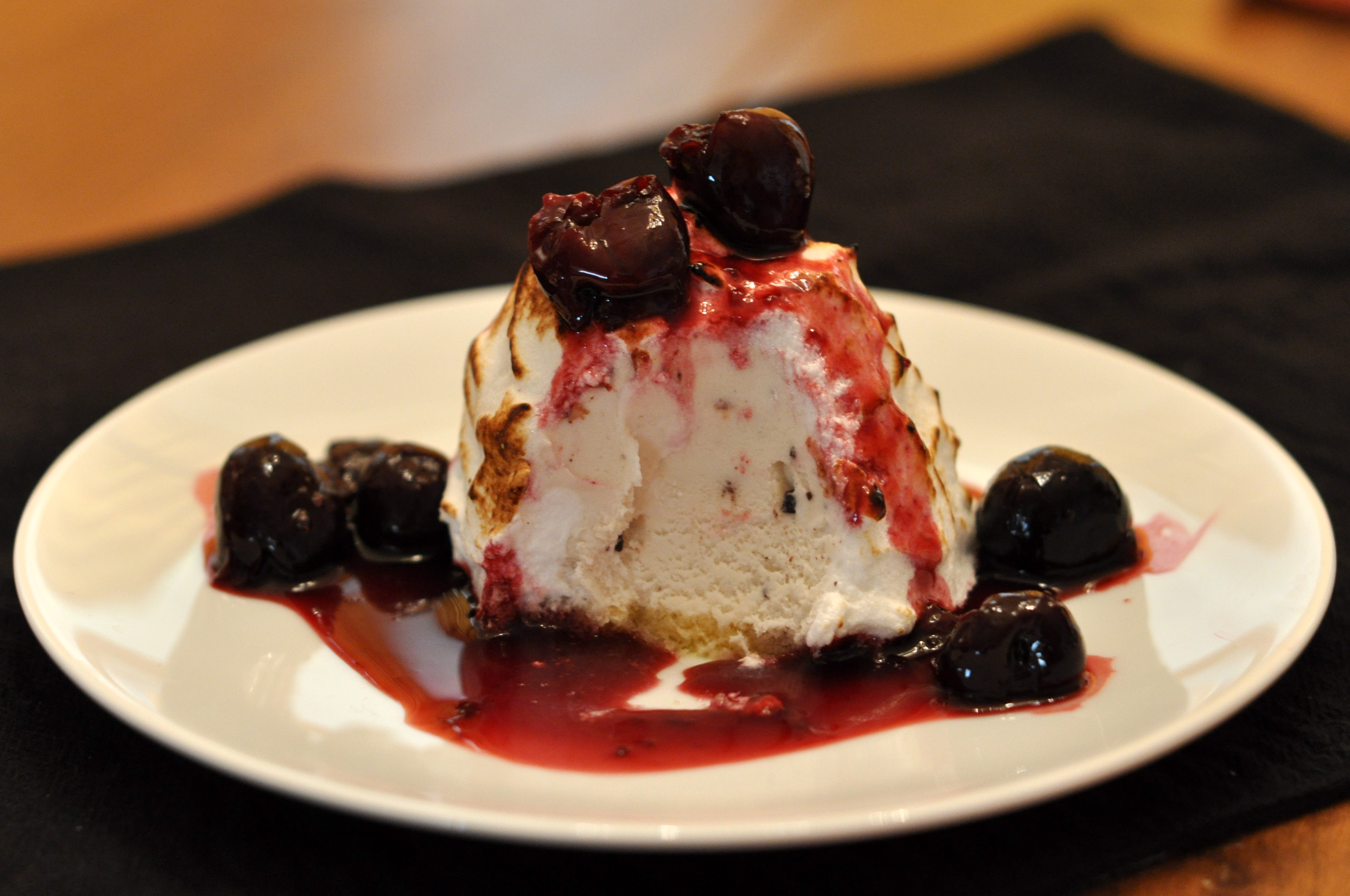
Baked Alaska, ice cream and cake topped with browned meringue

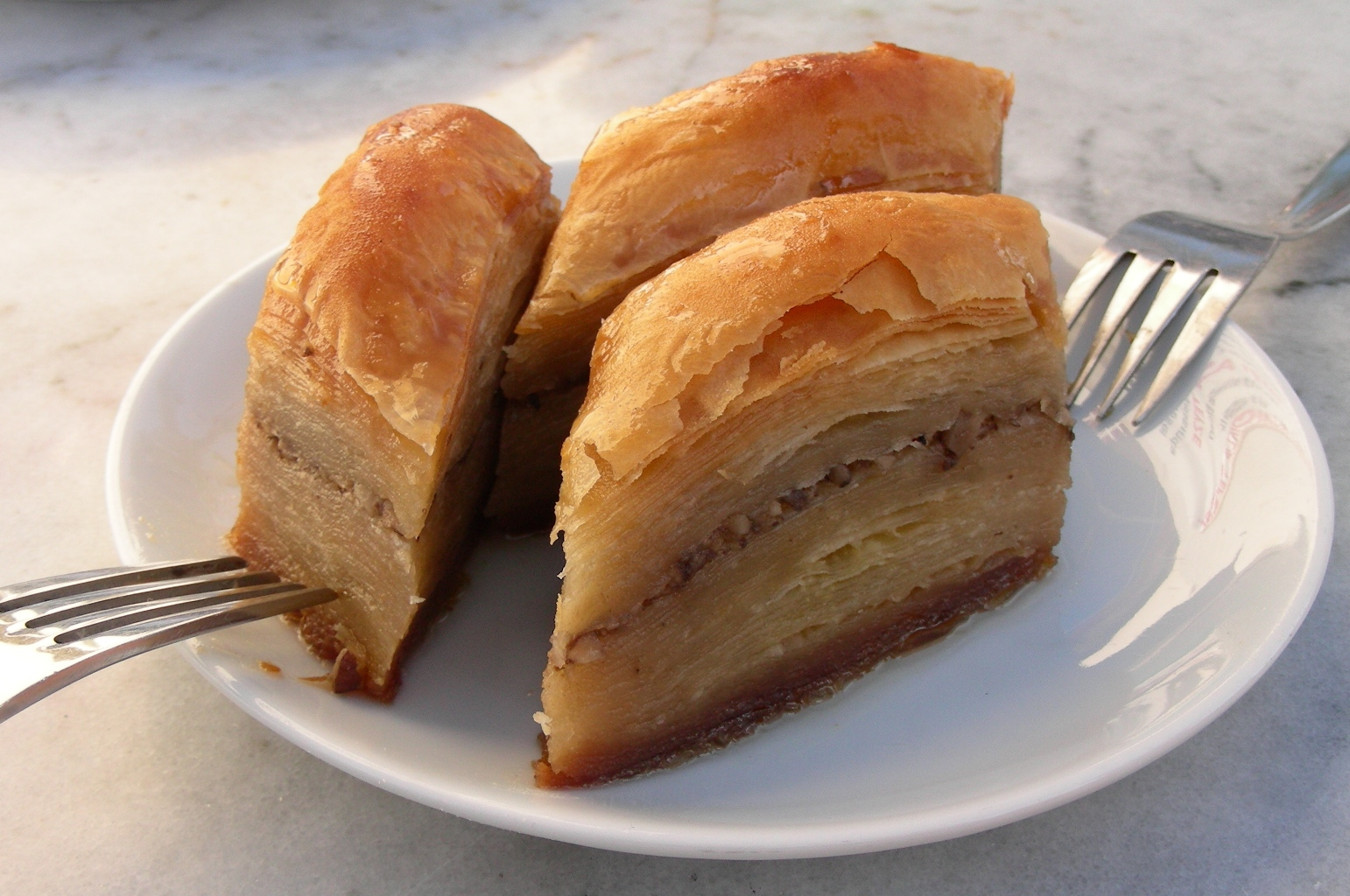
Baklava, a pastry comprising layers of filo with chopped nuts, sweetened and held together with syrup or honey

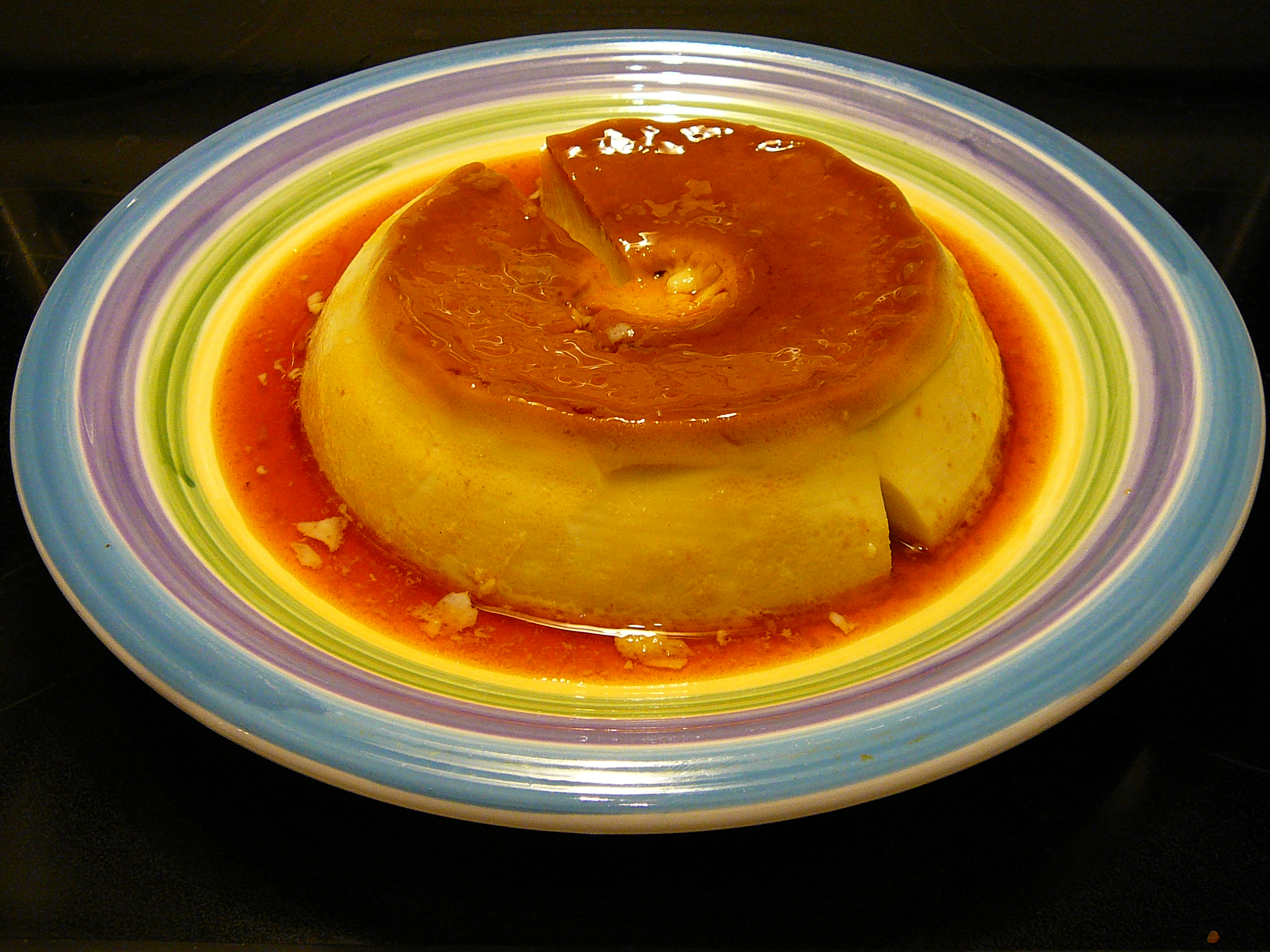
Baked custard or flan

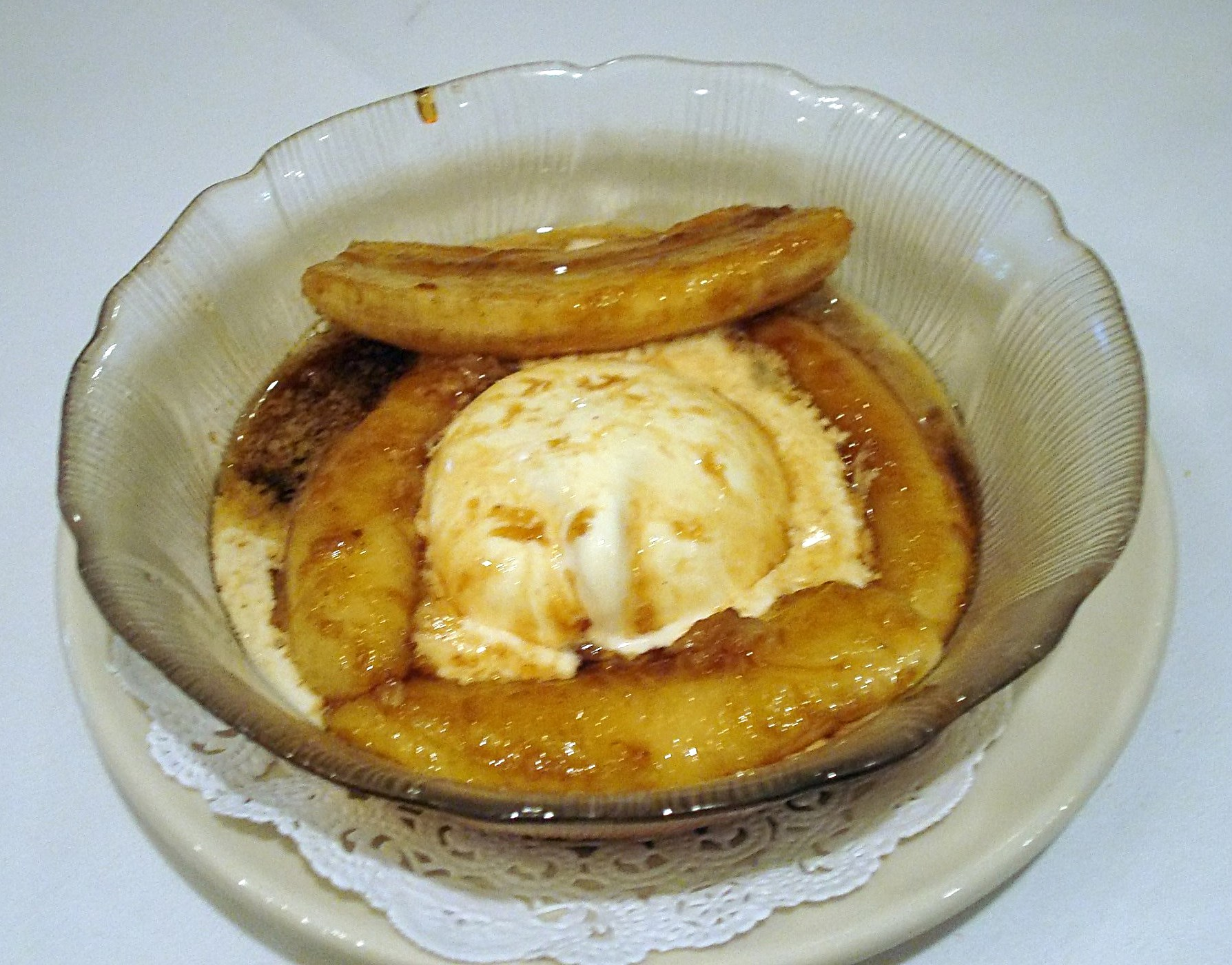
Bananas Foster, made of bananas and vanilla ice cream with a sauce made of butter, brown sugar, cinnamon, dark rum and banana liqueur

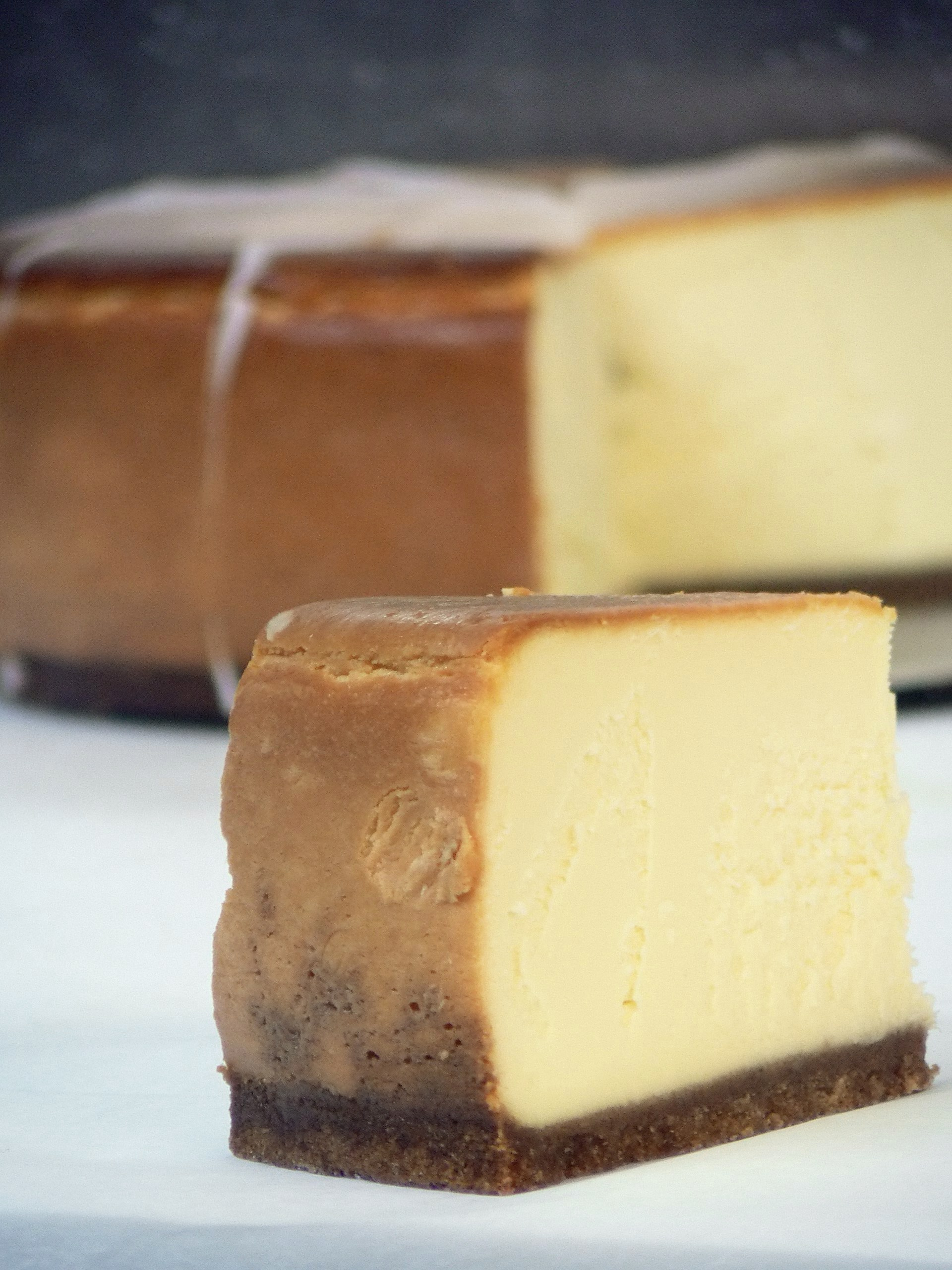
Cheesecake, consisting of sweet cream cheese filling

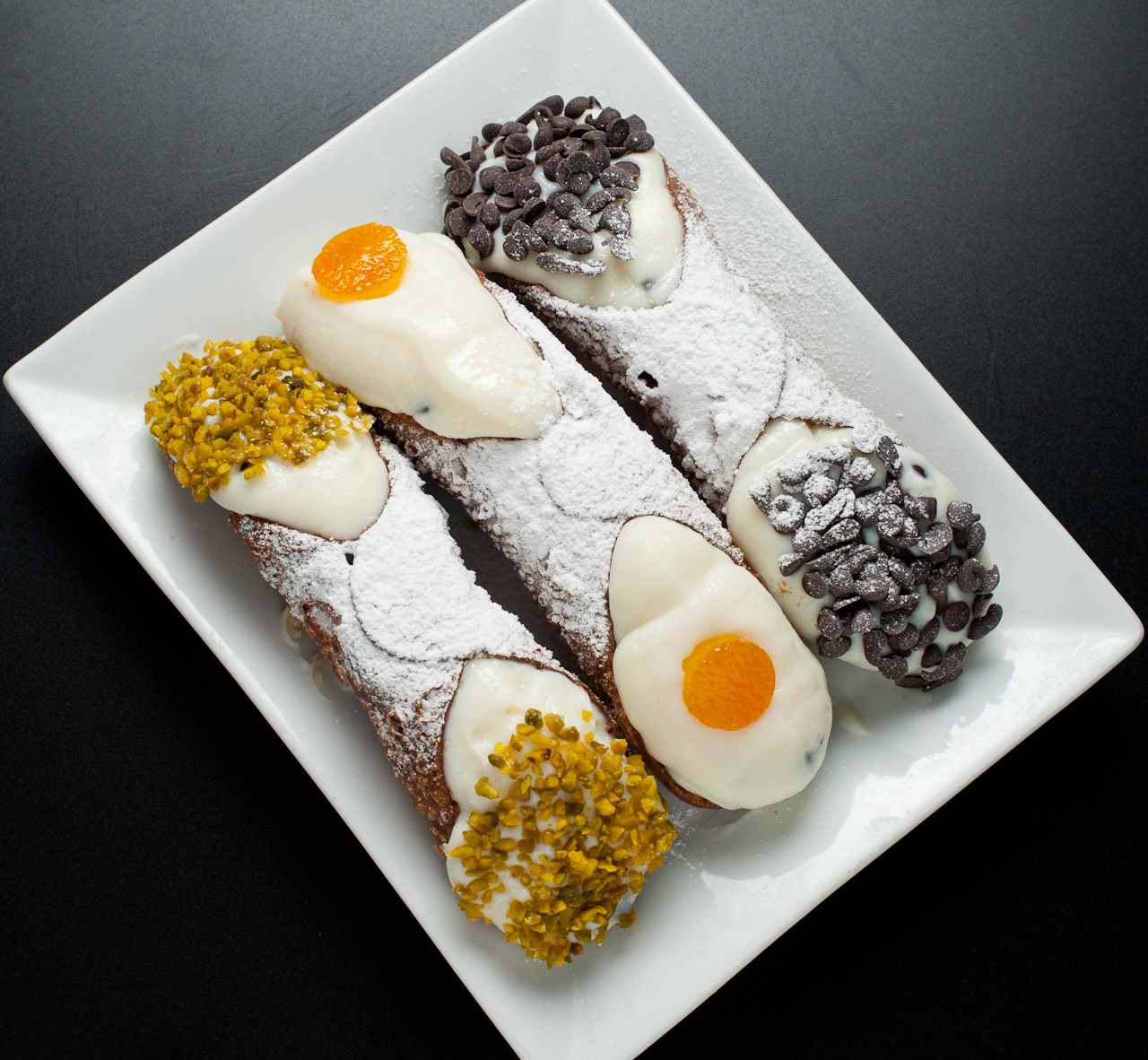
Cannoli with pistachio dust, candied and chocolate drops

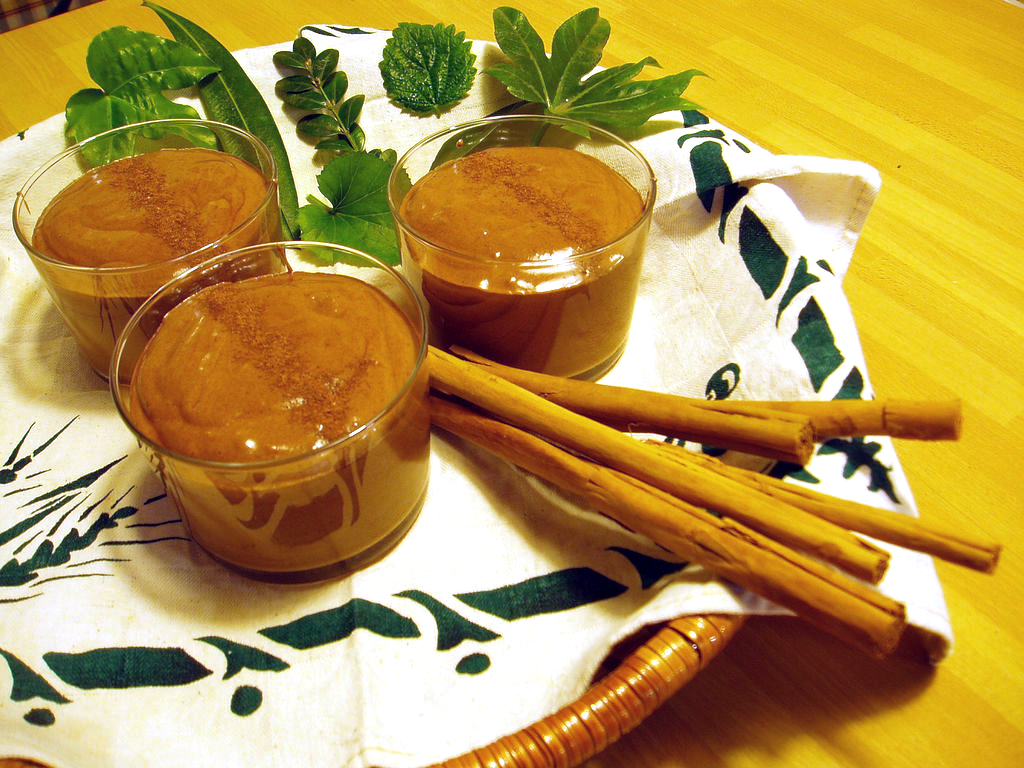
Chocolate mousse, a chocolate variety of a dessert incorporating air bubbles to give it a light and airy texture

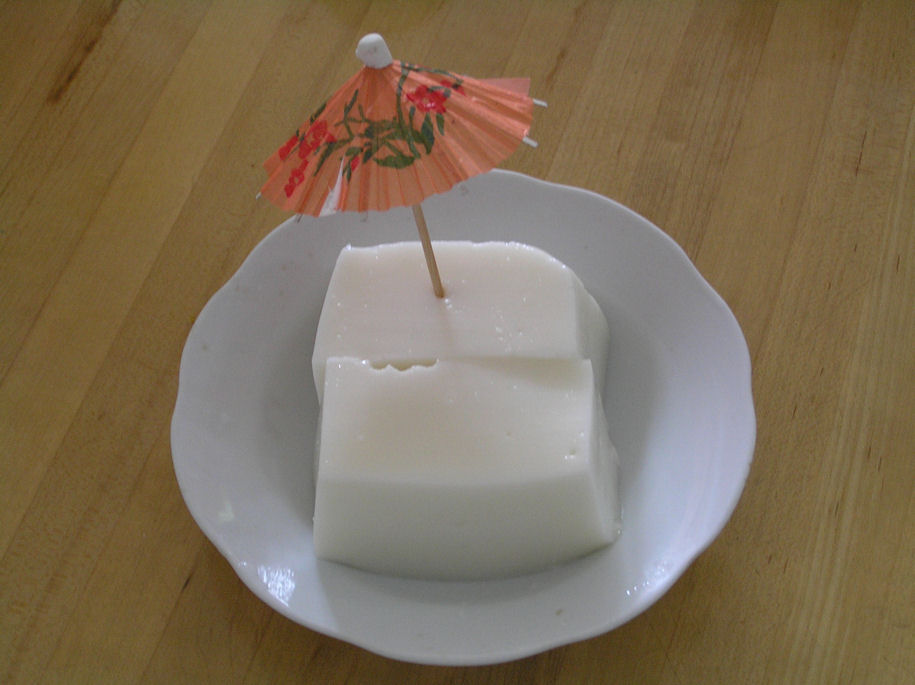
Coconut bar, made with coconut milk and set with either tang flour and corn starch, or agar agar and gelatin

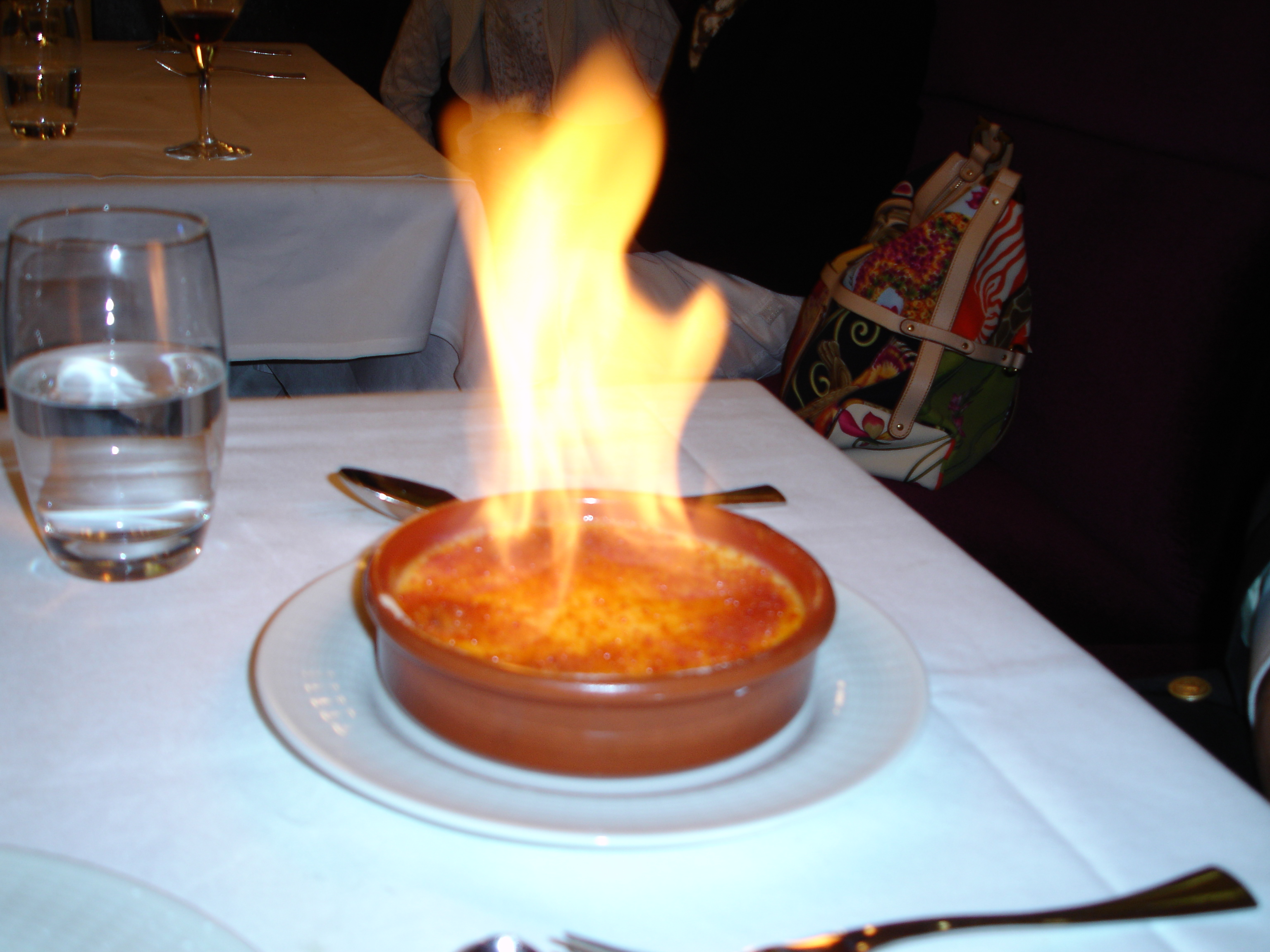
Preparation of crème brûlée, a rich custard base topped with a contrasting layer of hard caramel

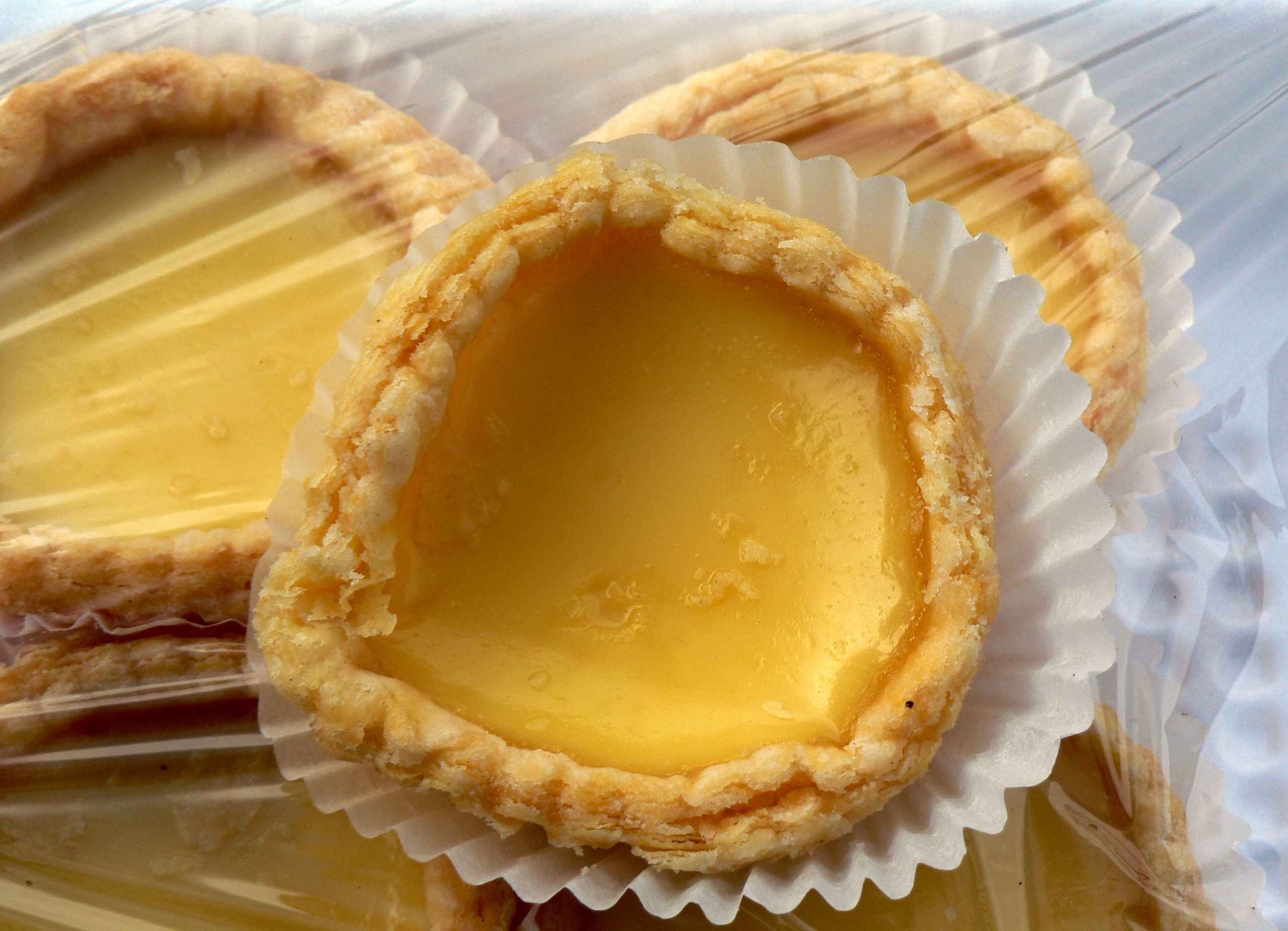
Egg custard tarts, a pastry originating from Guangzhou, China

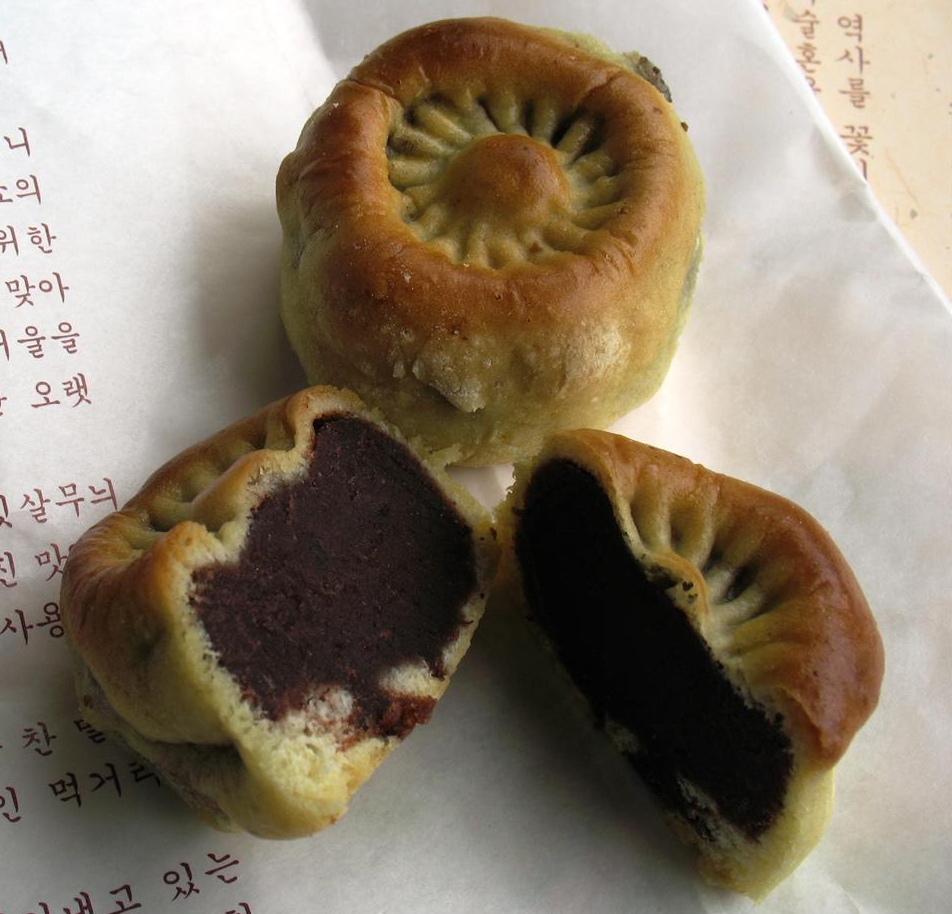
Gyeongju bread, a small pastry with a filling of red bean paste

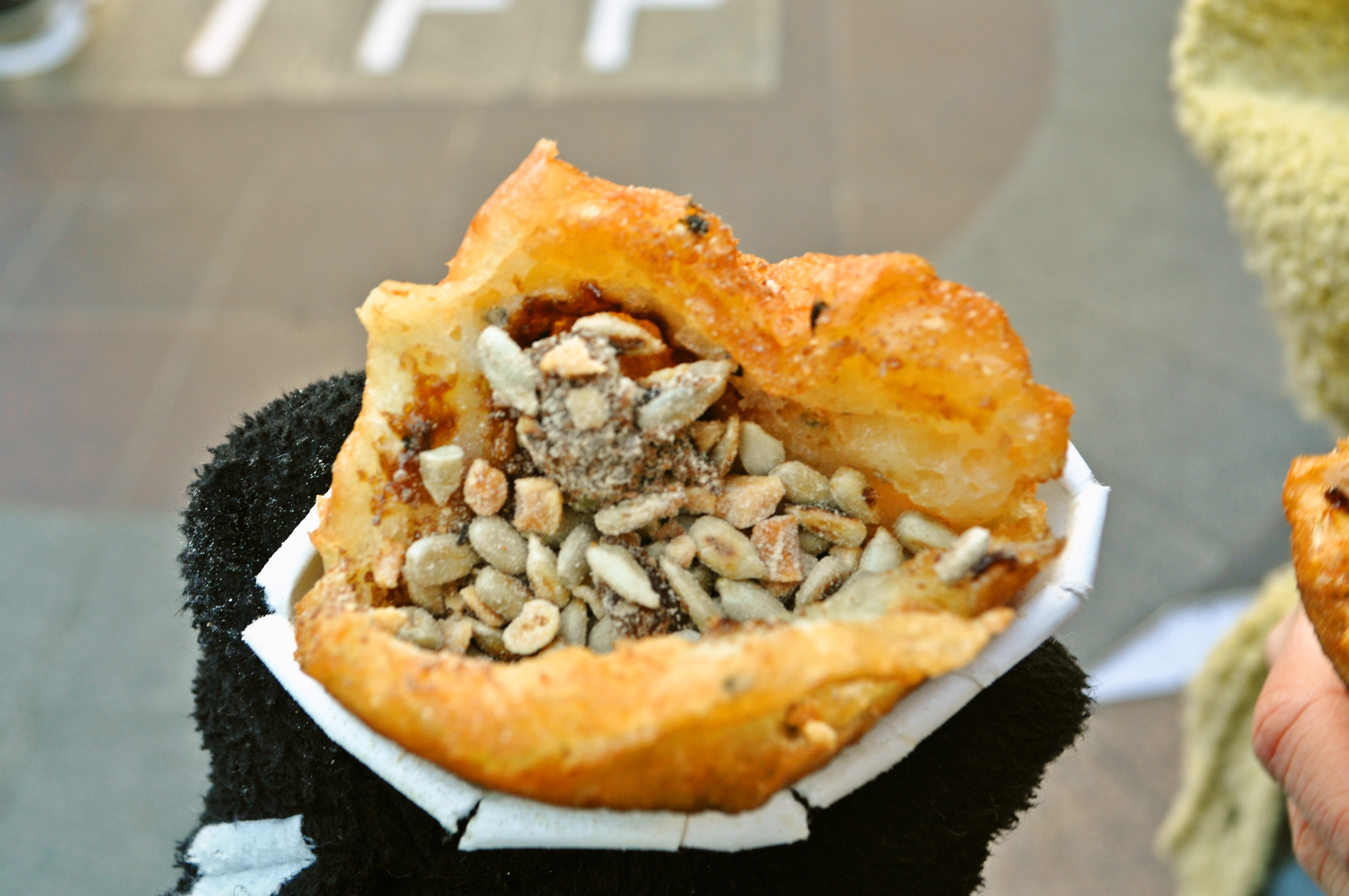
Hotteok (a variety of filled Korean pancake) with edible seeds, sugar, and cinnamon

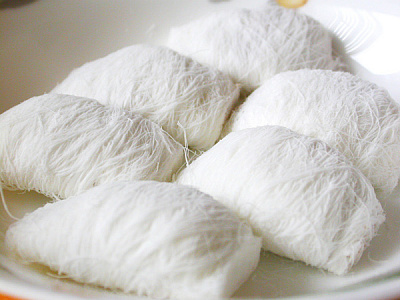
Kkul-tarae, fine strands of honey and maltose, often with a sweet nut filling

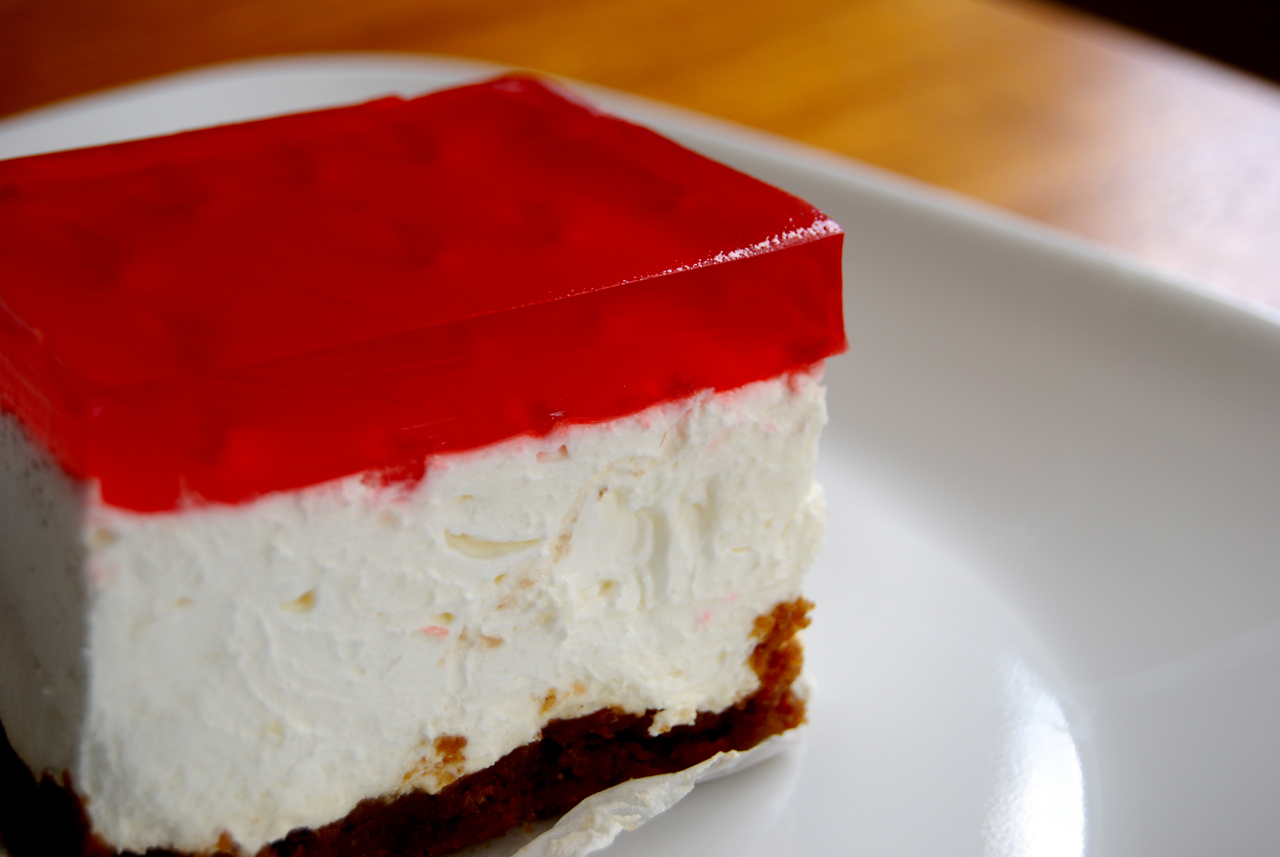
Jell-O and cheesecake

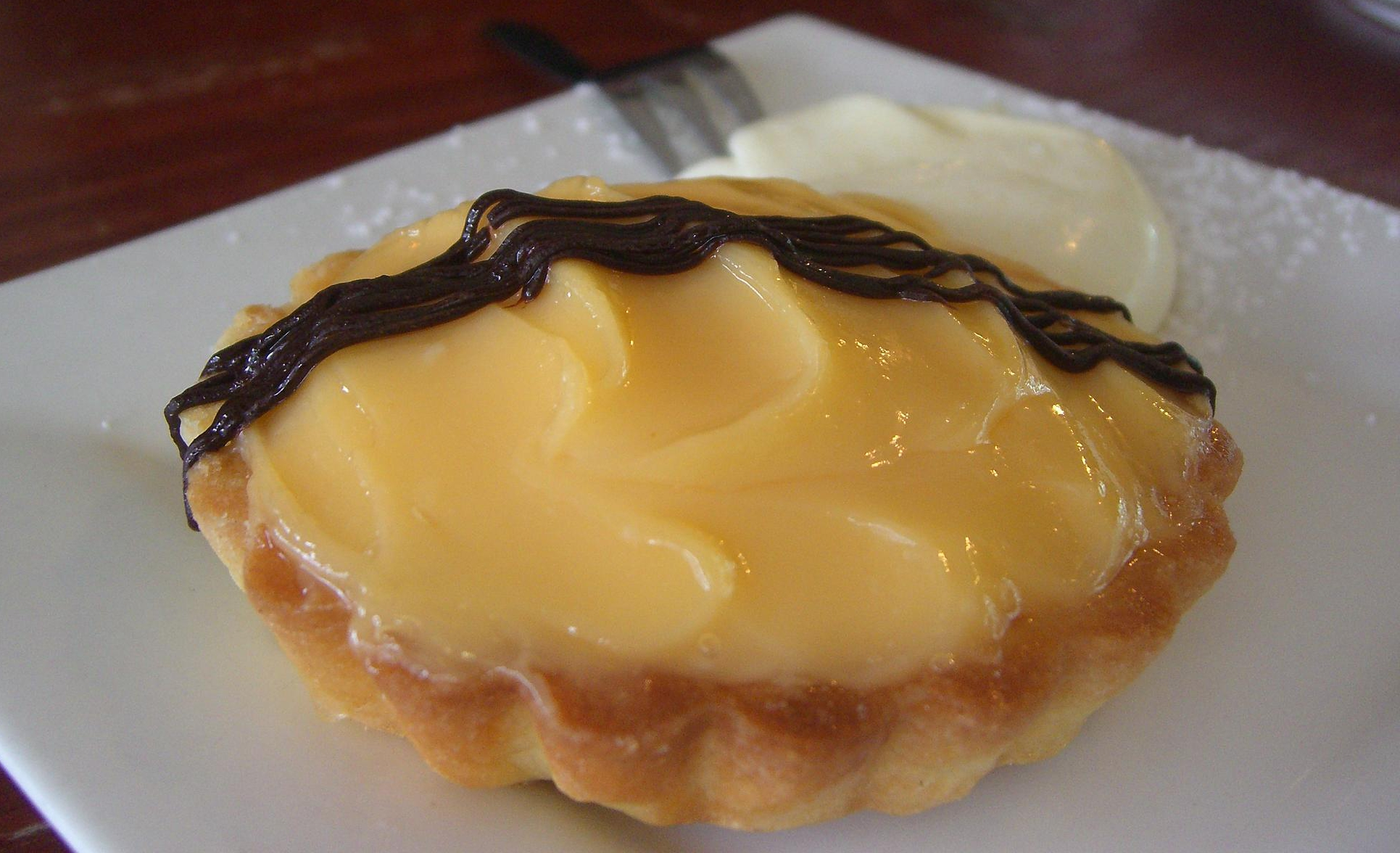
Lemon tart, a pastry shell with a lemon-flavored filling

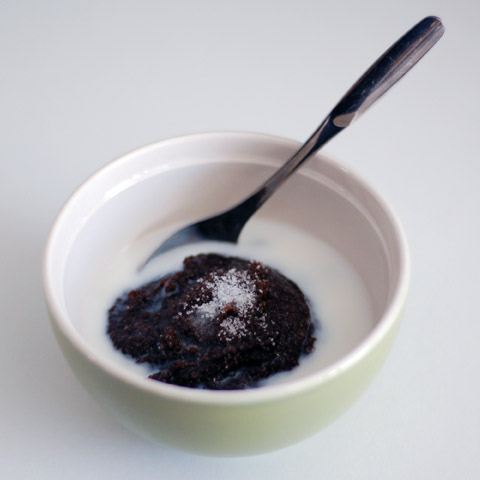
Mämmi, a Finnish Easter dessert

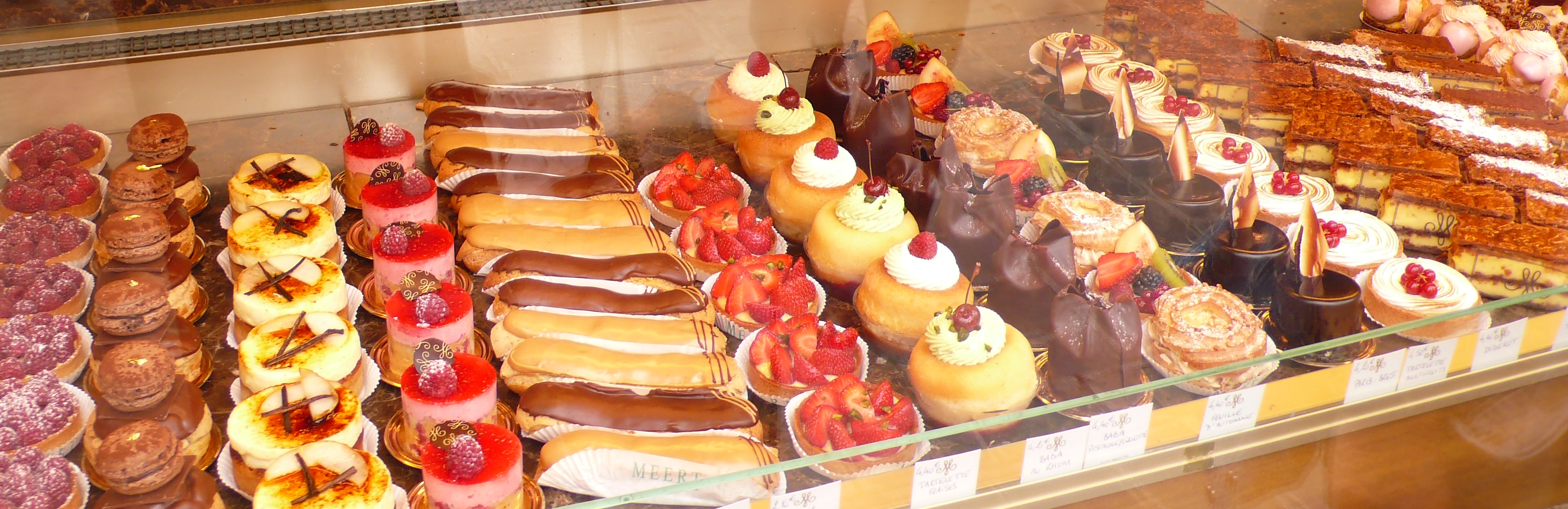
An assortment of pastries at a bakery

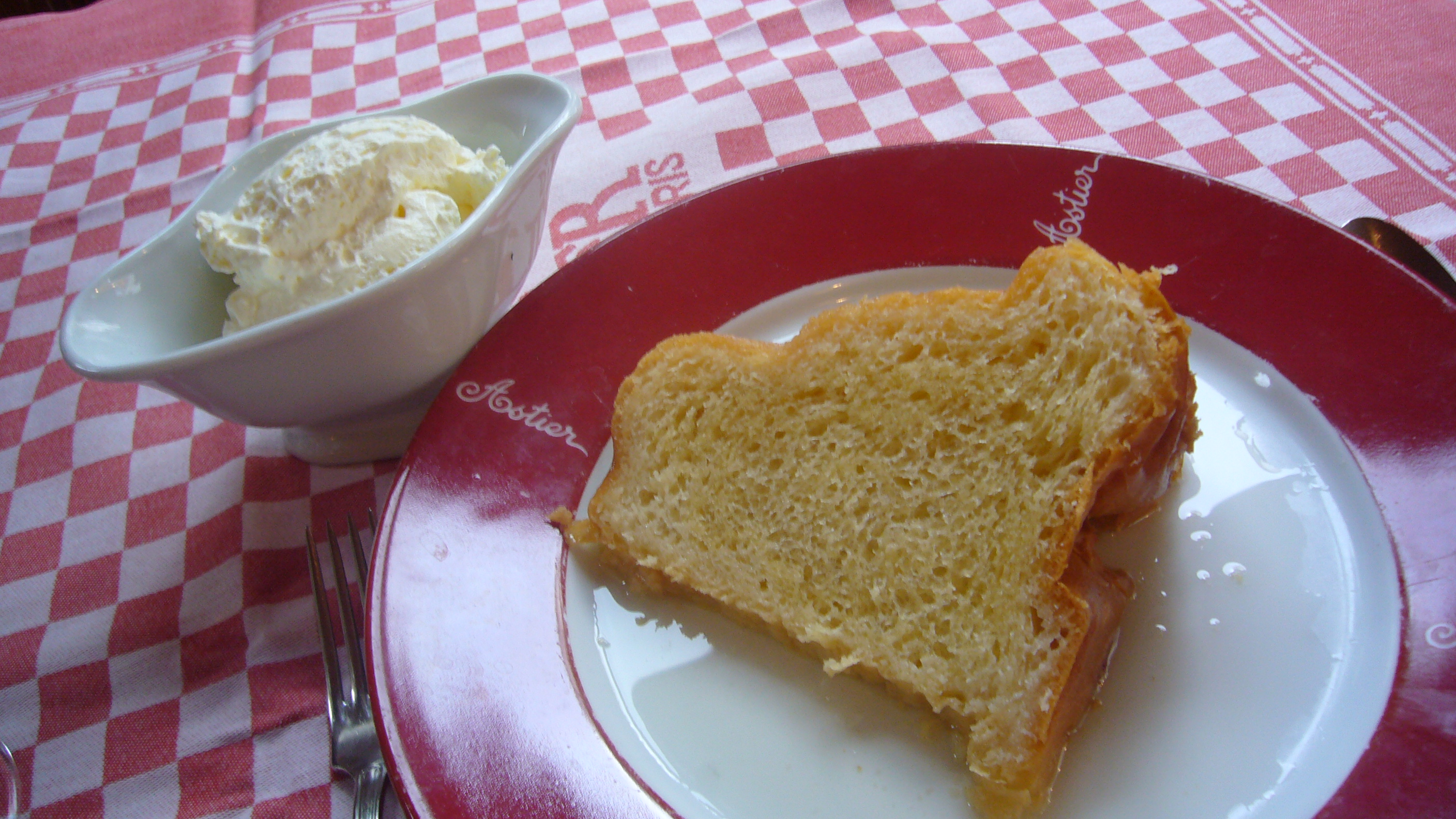
Rum cake, a type of cake containing rum

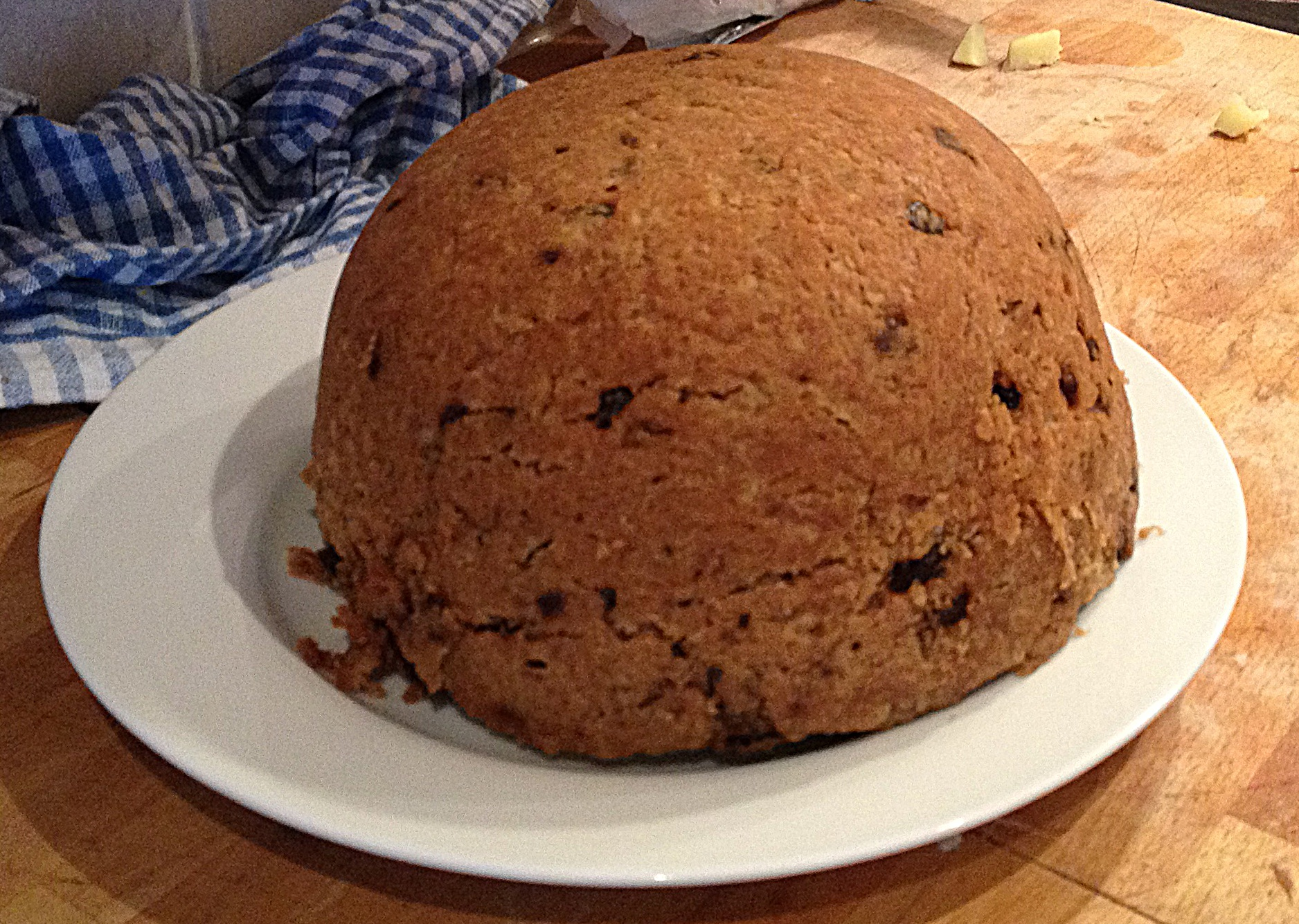
Spotted dick, a type of steamed pudding made with dried fruit

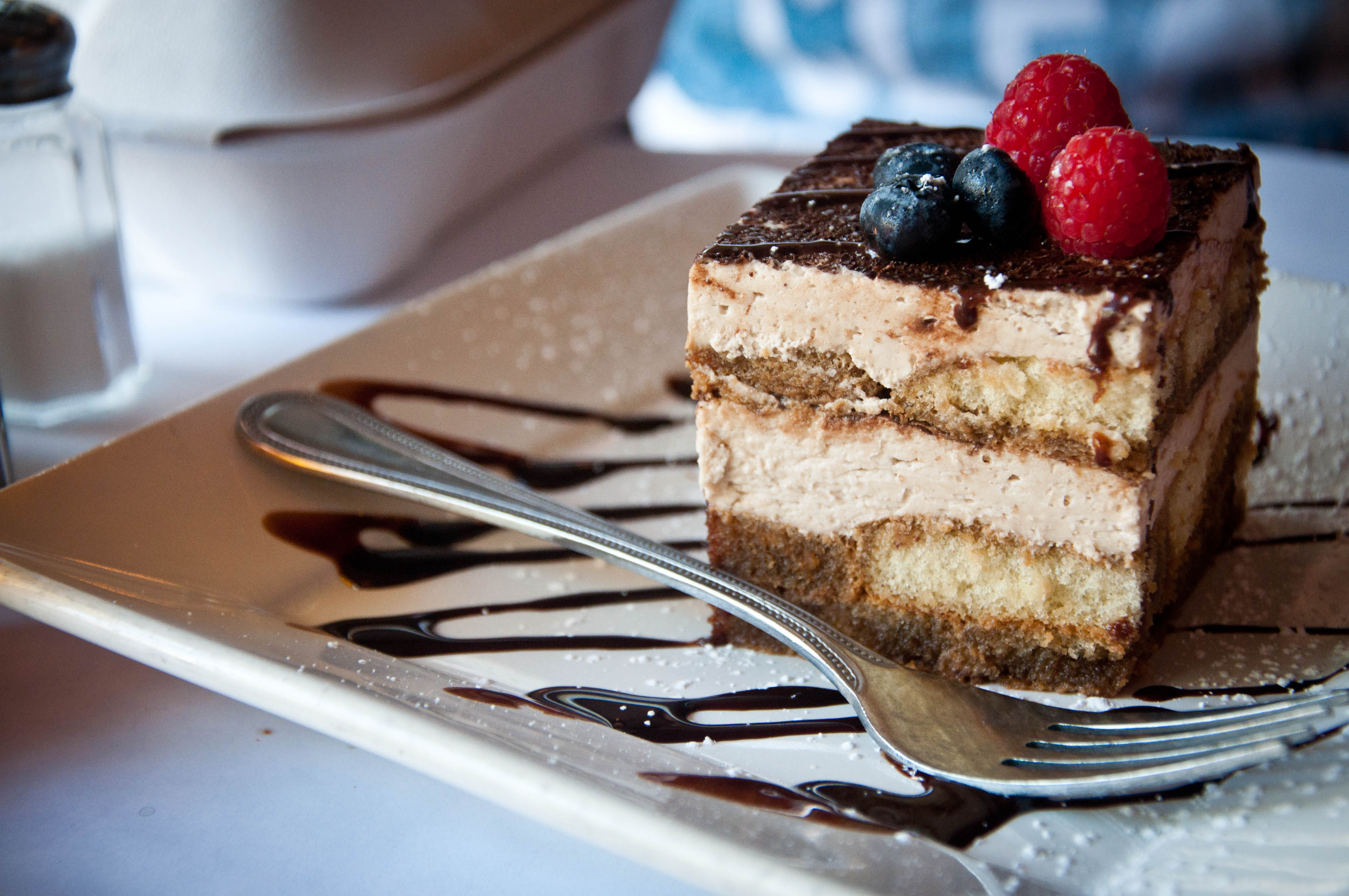
Tiramisu

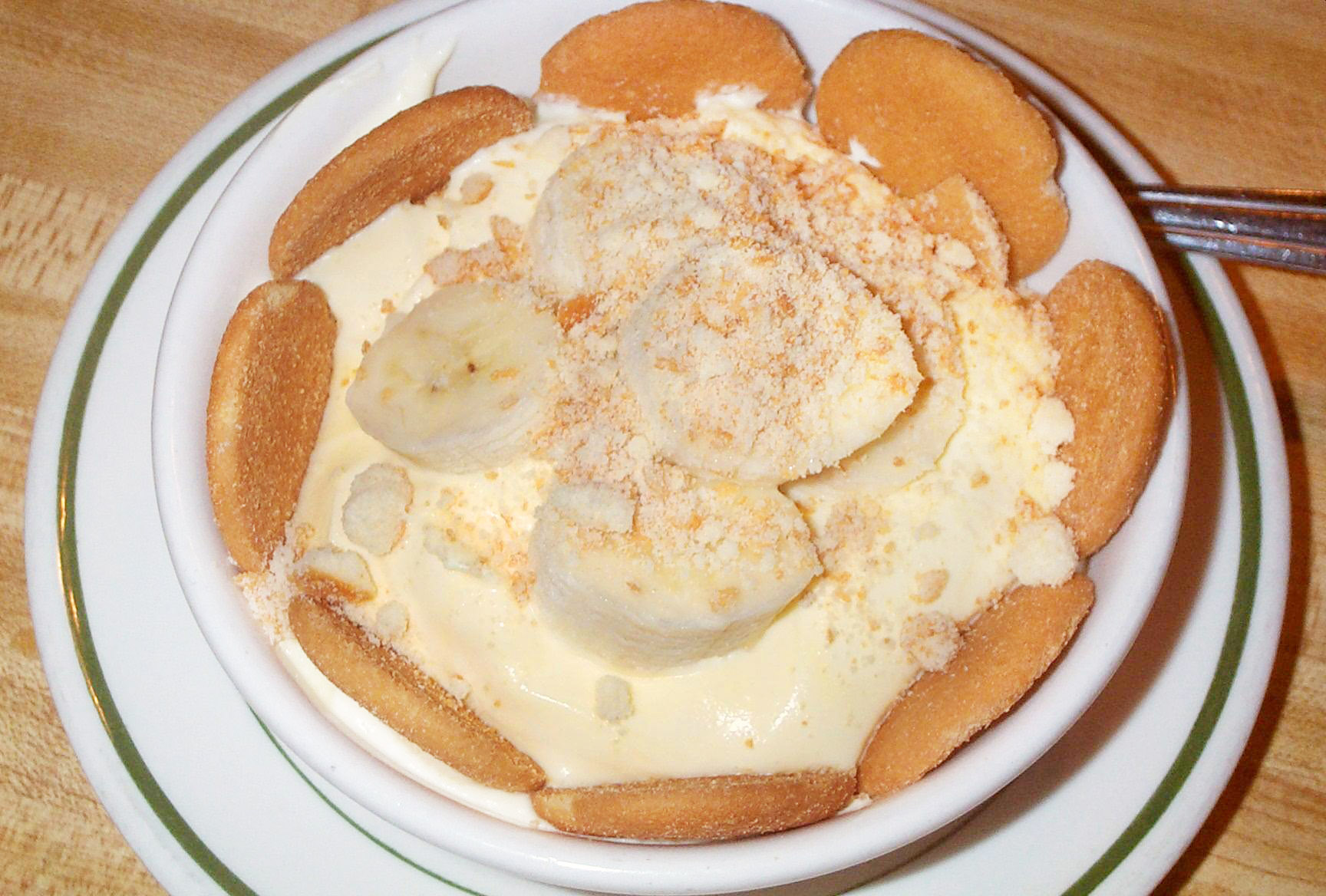
Homemade banana pudding

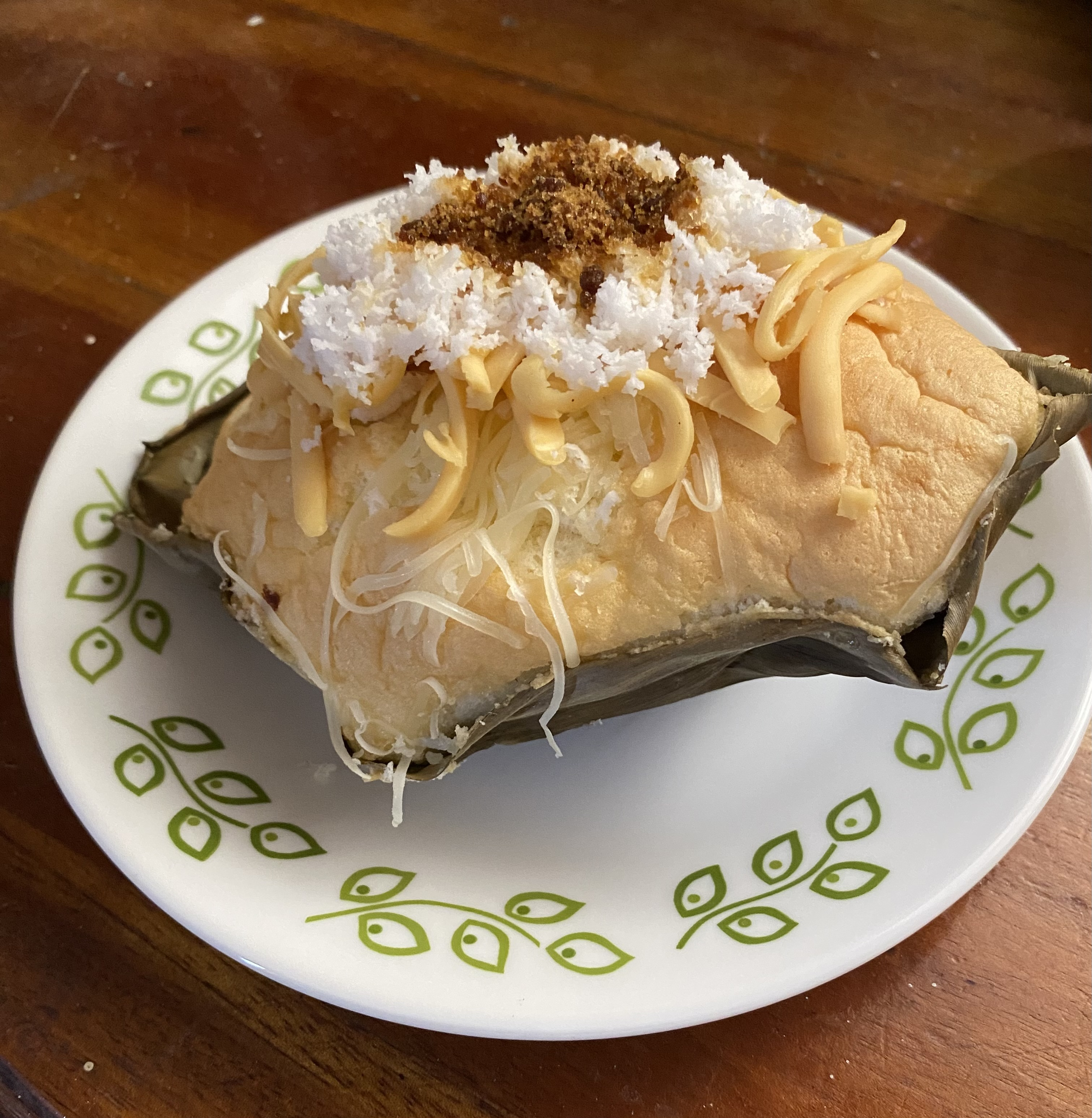
Bibingka, a rice cake with toppings

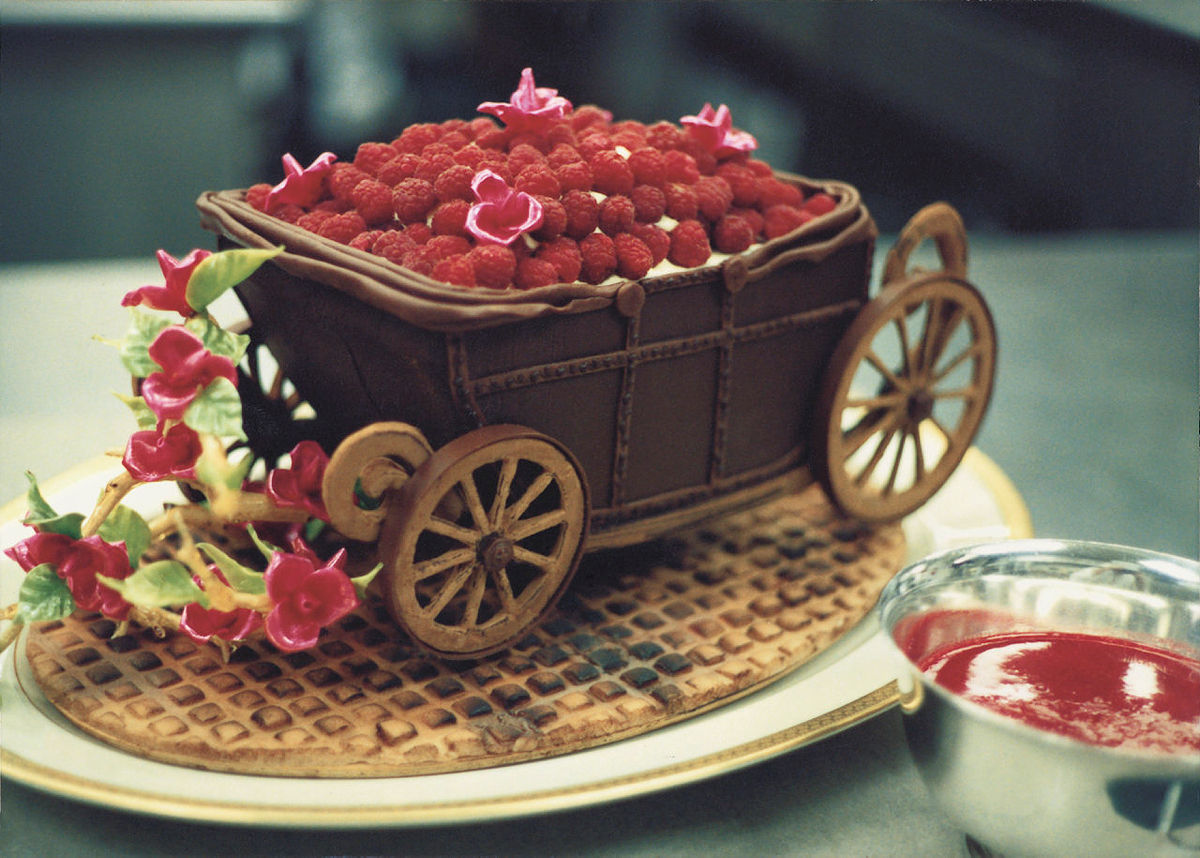
Chocolate carriage with raspberries on waffle cookie

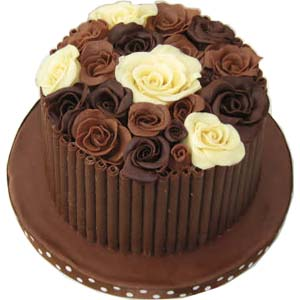
Chocolate cake with chocolate roses

A homemade brookie

Chocolate chip cookies

== See also ==
=== Notable articles ===
- Sugar
- Food
- Culinary arts
- Meal
- Confectionary store
- Candy
- Snack

=== List articles ===
- List of desserts
- List of dessert sauces
- List of Bangladeshi sweets and desserts
- List of foods
- List of Indian sweets and desserts
- List of Indonesian desserts
- List of Italian desserts
- List of Pakistani sweets and desserts
- List of Sri Lankan sweets and desserts
- List of Turkish desserts

== Notes, references, and sources ==
=== Sources ===
- Adamson, Melitta Weiss (2004). Food in Medieval Times. Westport, CT: Greenwood Press. ISBN 0313321477.
- Albala, Ken; Tomasik, Timothy, eds. (2014). The Most Excellent Book of Cookery, Livre fort excellent de cuysine. Totnes, Devon: Prospect Books. ISBN 978-1903018965.
- Bloom, Carole (2006). The Essential Baker: The Comprehensive Guide to Baking with Fruits, Nuts, Spices, Chocolate, and Other Ingredients. Hoboken, NJ: Wiley. ISBN 978-0-7645-7645-4.
- Brereton, Georgine E.; Ferrier, Janet M., eds. (1981). Le Menagier de Paris. Oxford: Clarendon Press. ISBN 0198157487.
- Burckhardt, A.L.; Germaine, E. (2004). Cooking the Australian Way. Easy Menu Ethnic Cookbooks (2nd ed.). Ebsco Publishing. ISBN 978-0-8225-1697-2.
- Charlton, Anne (2005). "An example of health education in the early 17th century: Naturall and artificial Directions for Health by William Vaughan". Health Education Research. 20 (6): 656–664. doi:10.1093/her/cyh030. PMID 15857908.
- Drzal, Dawn (2 December 2011). "How We Got to Dessert". The New York Times. Archived from the original on 1 January 2022.
- Flandrin, Jean-Louis (2007) [2001]. Arranging the Meal: A History of Table Service in France [L'Ordre des mets]. Translated by Johnson, Julie E. Berkeley: University of California Press. ISBN 978-0520238855.
- Grimod de La Reynière, Alexandre-Balthazar-Laurent (1805). Almanach des Gourmands, troisième année. Paris: Maradan.
- Krondl, Michael (2011). Sweet Invention: A History of Dessert. Chicago IL: Chicago Review Press. ISBN 978-1-55652-954-2.
- Montagné, Prosper (1938). Larousse Gastronomique. Paris: Librairie Larousse.
- Tomasik, Timothy J. (May 2016). "Cuisine by the Cut of One's Trousers: Cookbook Marketing in Early Modern France". Food and History. 14 (2–3): 223–247. doi:10.1484/J.FOOD.5.115341. ISSN 1780-3187.
