= Bhojpuri cuisine =

Culinary traditions of the Bhojpur region of India

Bhojpuri cuisine is a style of food preparation common among the Bhojpuri people of Bihar, Jharkhand and eastern Uttar Pradesh in India, and also the Terai region of Nepal. Bhojpuri foods are mostly mild and tend to be less hot in terms of spices used. The cuisine consists of both vegetable and non-vegetarian dishes.

== Breads ==
Various kinds of breads are consumed in Bhojpuri cuisine. Roti or chapati is prepared almost every day and eaten in all three meals. Millet breads are also cooked occasionally, depending upon the season.

Paraothhas are prepared for breakfast. Paraothhas are usually stuffed with vegetables, chhena, dal, or sattu. Sometimes, layered paranthas with spices like ajwain are also prepared.

Occasionally, deep-fried breads like puri, dalpuri (also called dalahipuri), lichui, suhari, and kachauri are also prepared. Puas (sweet pancakes) are also commonly cooked in monsoon season or on religious occasions.

Special breads exclusive to the region include:

- Makuni / berhai – puffed wheat bread which is stuffed with sattu and spices and then fried
- Litti – a hard, unleavened wheat bread which is eaten along with chokha. Comes in many different kinds. Phutehri is a kind of litti which is stuffed with sattu and spices.
- Gojha / pangojha / bhakosa – dal-stuffed bread which is either steamed or fried. The dough can be made using wheat flour or rice flour or semolina.
- Duhathi / panhathi – a soft, thin and double-layered roti
- Chautha – a thin batter spread over a skillet or tava like a dosa or cheela
- Dahirvari – these are fermented sweet fritters, usually made in bulk to be given to married daughters. Flour is mixed with jaggery and water, then left to ferment. After fermentation, the batter is beaten and balls of it are fried in ghee.
- Mahuari – mahua-flavoured bread
- Dhuska – made by frying a batter of rice and lentil flour and served with aloo ghugni / chhole and eaten for breakfast
- Thekua – considered a dessert or a biscuit-like snack, usually prepared during Chhath Puja

On special occasions, breads like tandoori roti, stuffed naan, and rumali roti are also prepared.

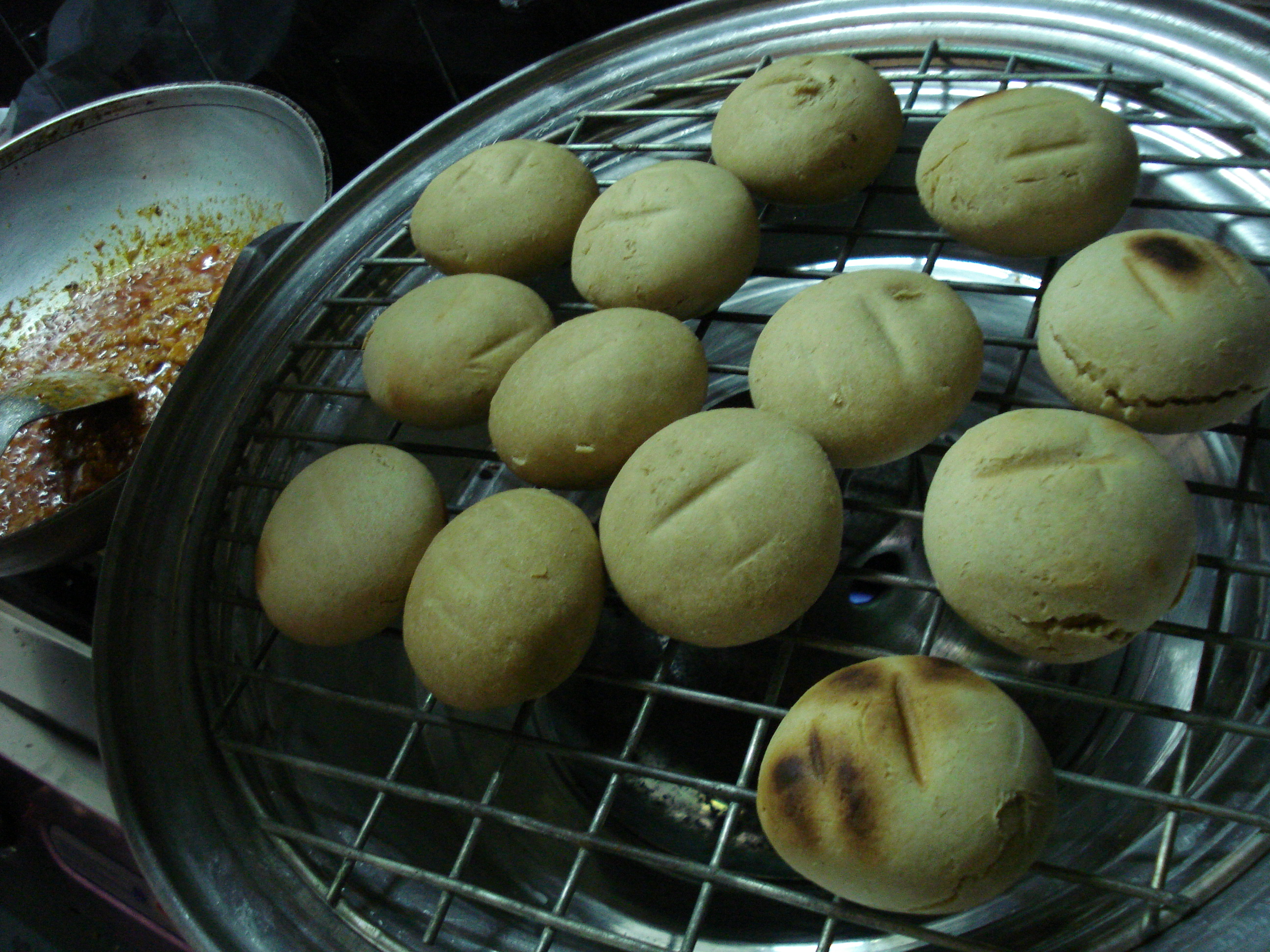
Litti

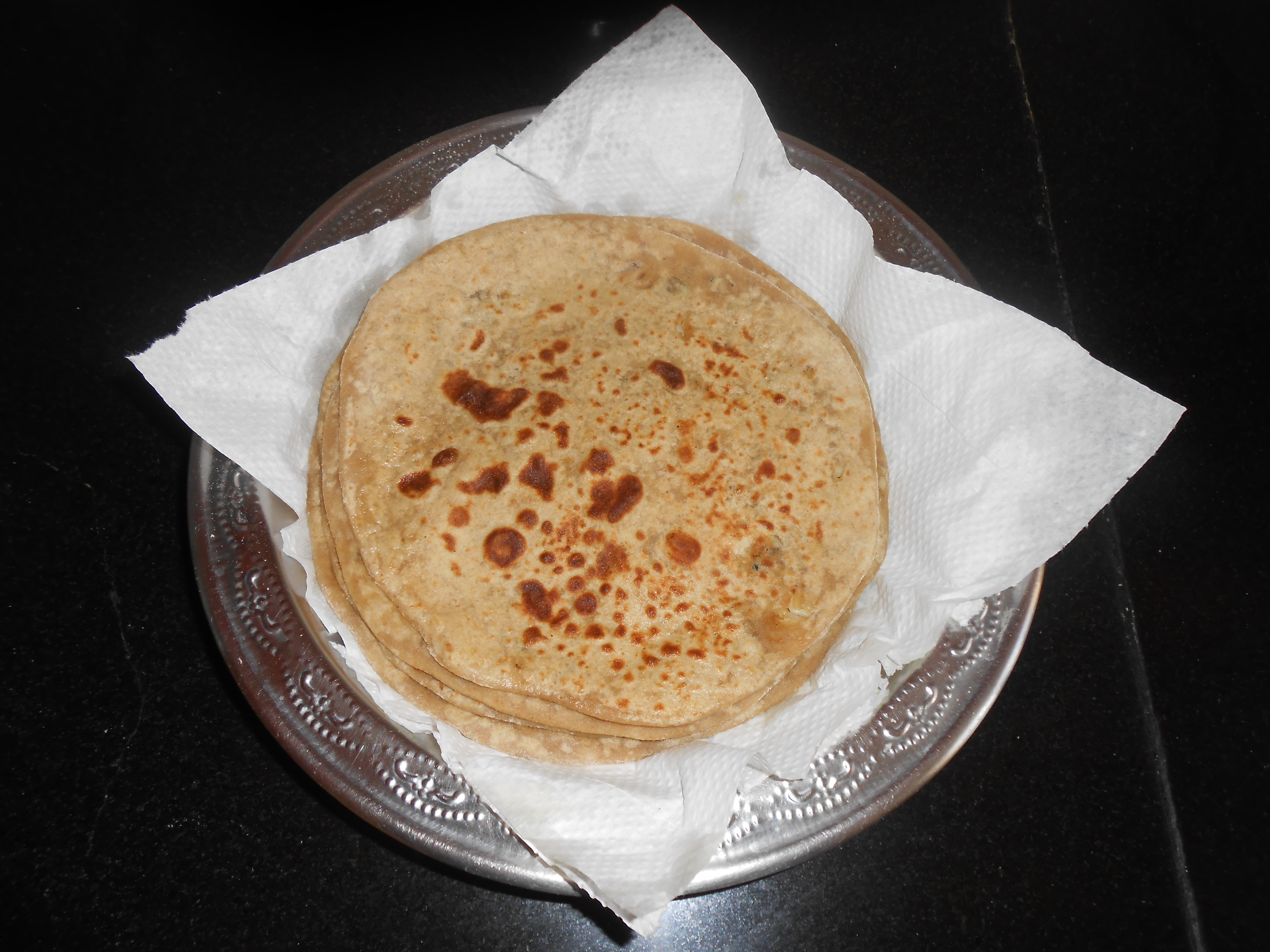
Sattu paranthas

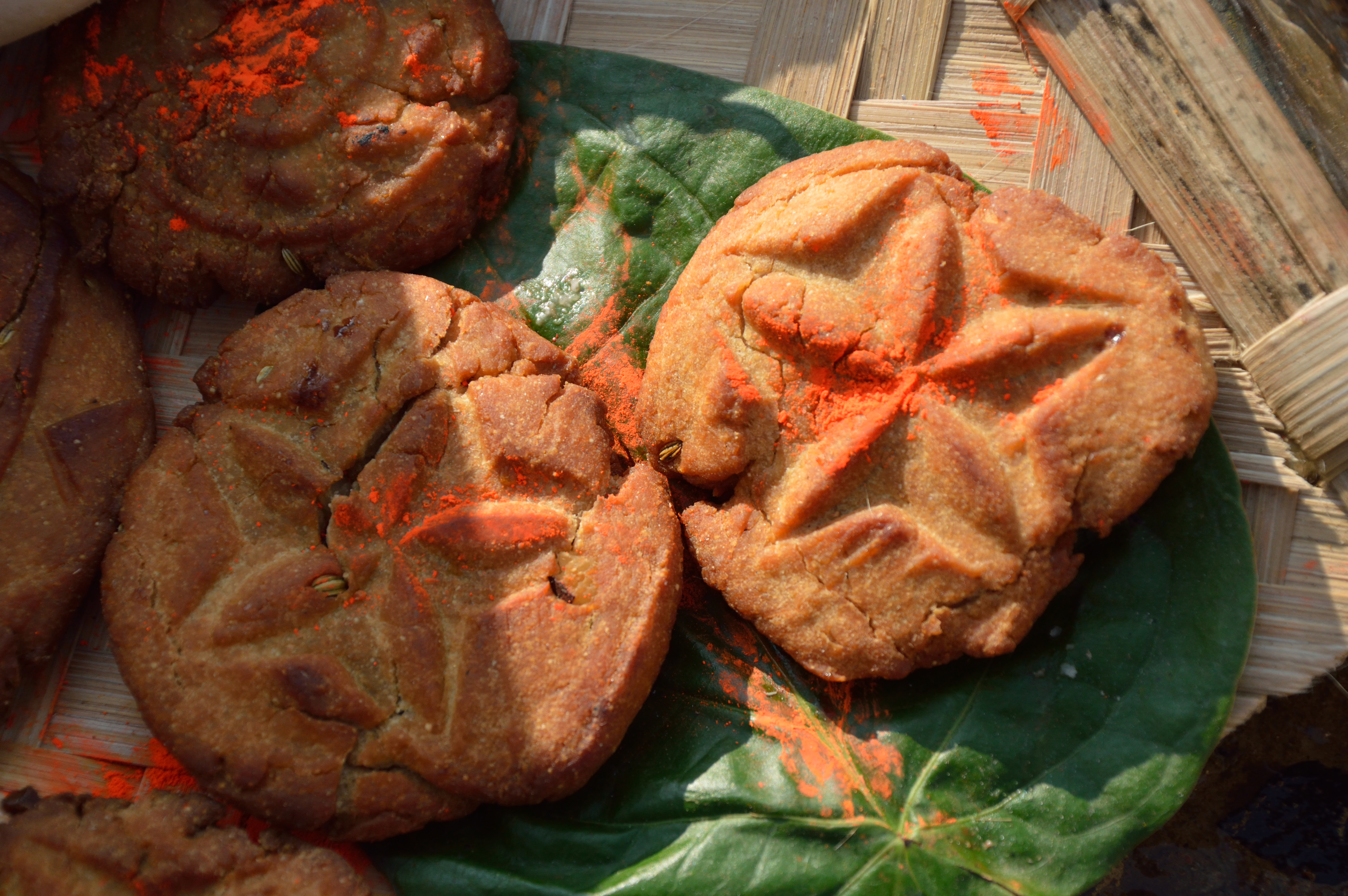
Thekua

== Rice dishes ==
Rice is one of the staple foods of the Bhojpur region. Plain-boiled rice is eaten almost every day with dal, bean gravies, and curries.

At ceremonies or on special occasions, Polao is commonly prepared in the region, which is a aromatic rice dish cooked in oil or ghee. Polao, along with Kadahi gos (a traditional mutton curry dish prepared in kadahi) or Kadahi murg (chicken curry), is a complete meal which is called Polao gos.

Other common rice dishes include:

- Noon jaauri – rice cooked with salt and spices. Vegetables (green peas, carrot, cauliflower, tubers), chhena, and dal badis (lentil balls) are also added. Served with raita.
- Meeth jaauri – rice cooked with jaggery or sugar, and dry fruit and saffron are added.
- Dahi jaauri – partially cooked rice is mixed with beaten curd or yoghurt. Spices are added to enhance the taste and flavour.
- Doodh jauri – rice is cooked in milk with ghee, dry fruits, sugar, and spices like cardamom. This dish resembles kheer, with a thinner consistency.
- Khichdi – often consumed as a convalescent food, but also prepared on Makar Sankranti and in Magh month. Khichdi is mostly consumed with pickle, chutney, papadam, and yoghurt. Khatua is a variant of khichdi flavoured with lemon juice.
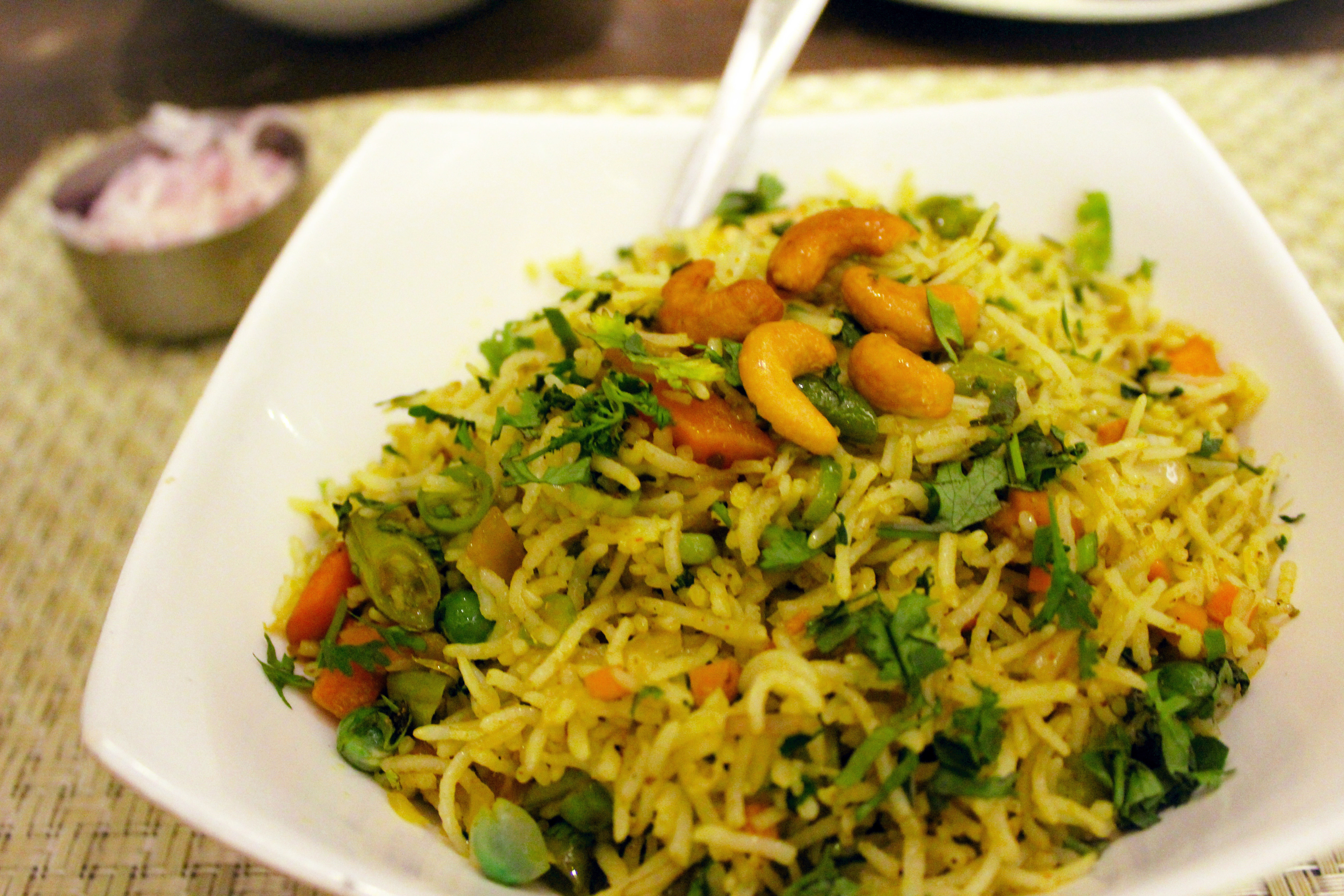
Noon jauri is a rice dish from Bhojpuri cuisine

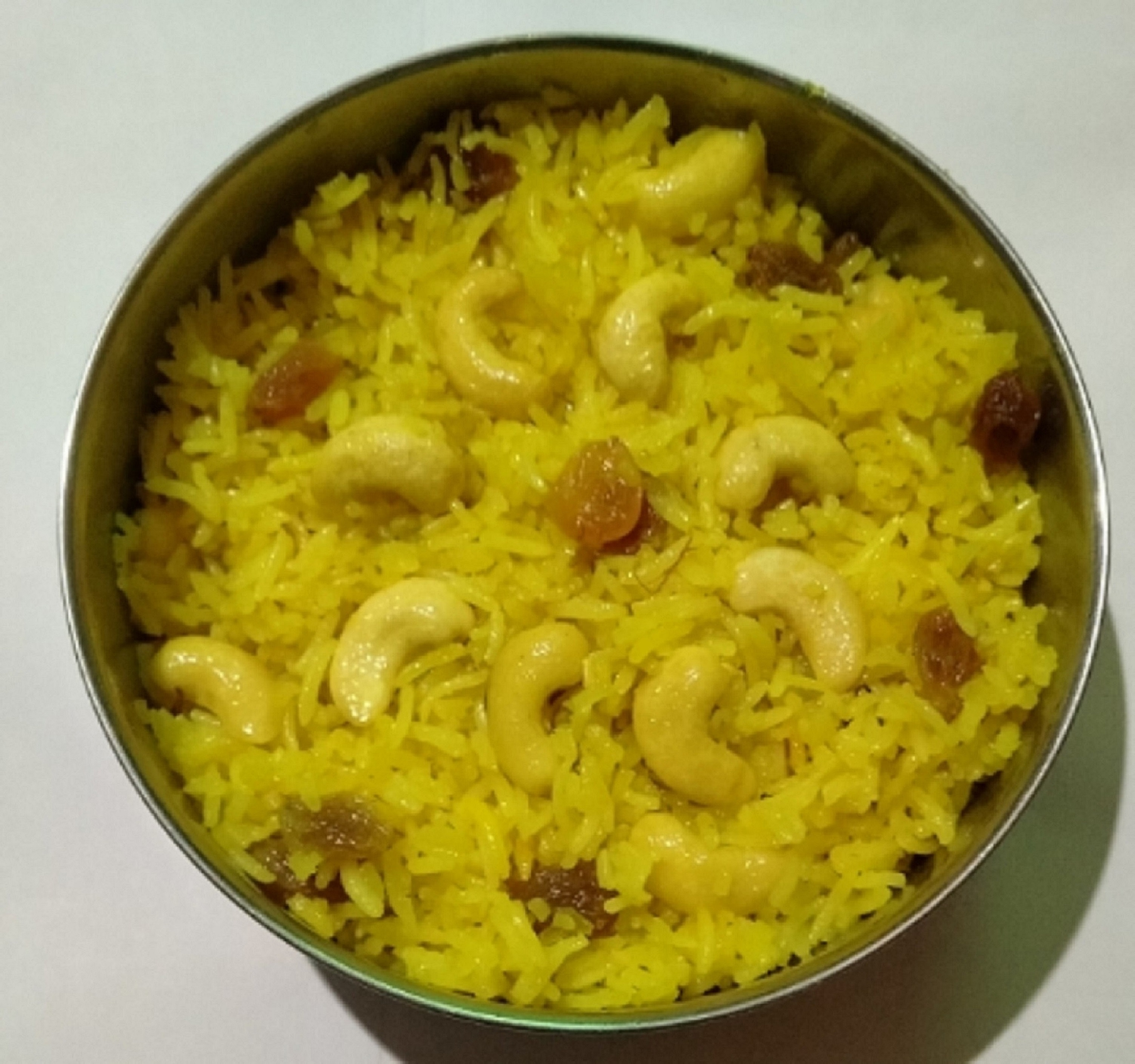
Meeth jaauri

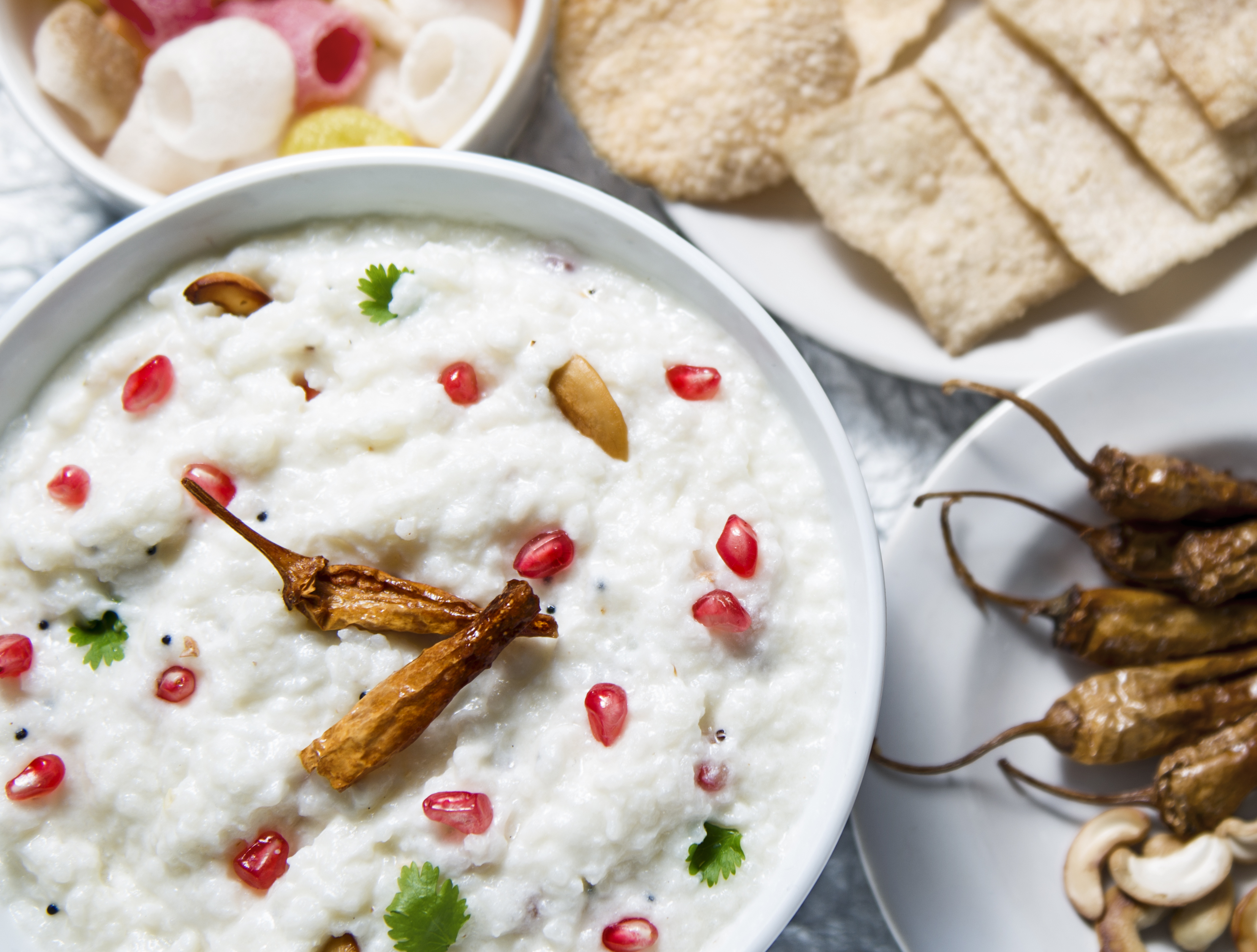
Dahi jauri (curd rice)

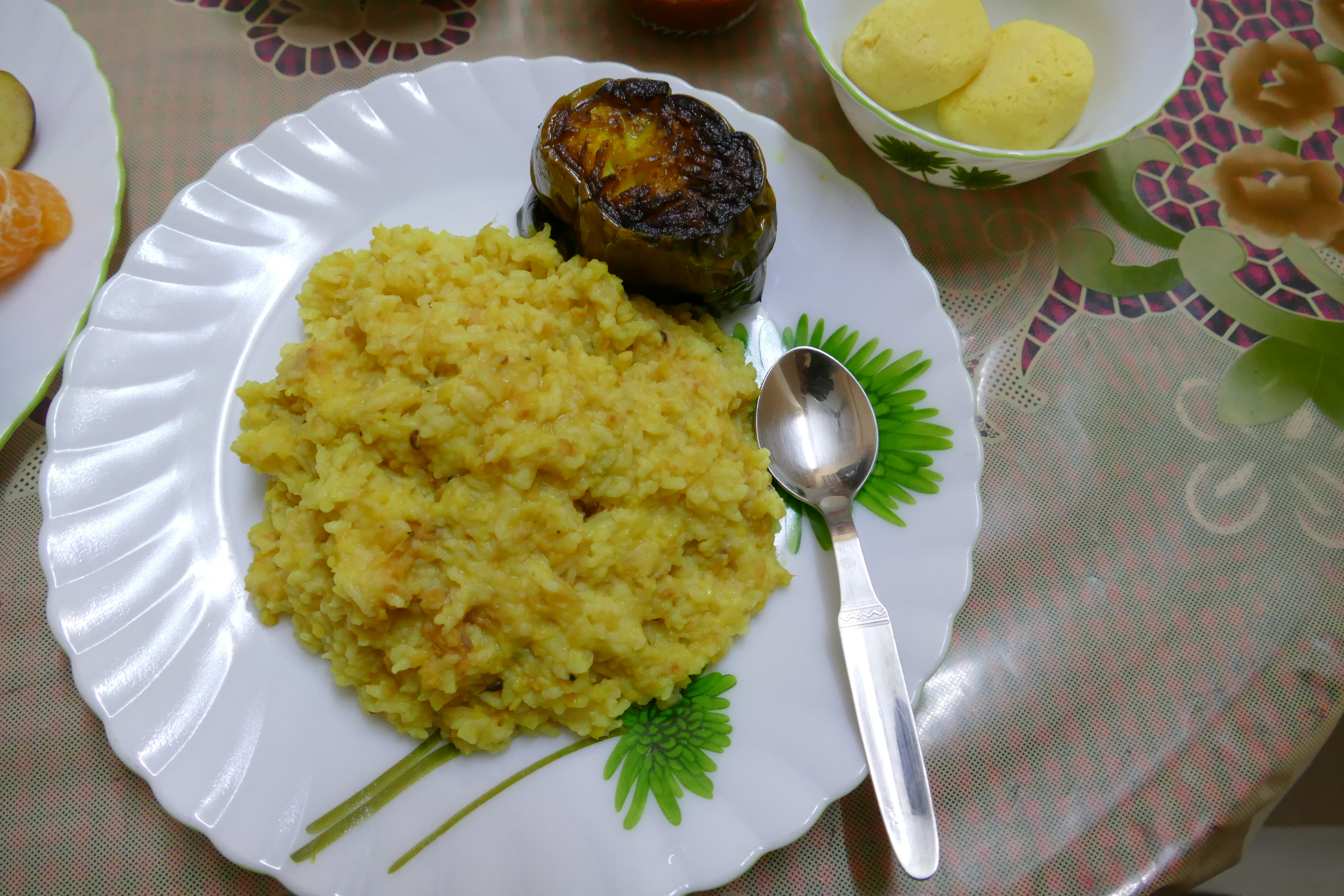
Khichdi

== Lentils and pulses ==
- Dal – lentils are mostly cooked into soups and consumed with rice and rotis. Various kinds of lentils are used in Bhojpuri cuisine, like arhar (pigeon pea), chana (split chickpea), moong (mung bean), matar (yellow peas), and urad dal (vigna mungo). However, arhar dal is most commonly cooked. It is often flavoured with dry mango, panchphorn, and jaggery.
- Dal pitthi / pithori – small wheat dumplings are made and cooked along with dal, giving it a thicker consistency. Dal pitthi is a combo in itself, like dal roti or dal bhaat.
- Advari – prepared from fermented urad dal. Urad dal is soaked in water and left to ferment, after which it is husked and ground into a paste. Salt, spices, and pulp of matua (petha) are added. Small dumplings are made out of the batter and dried in the sun before frying in hot oil. Advaris are added in vegetable preparations or rice dishes.
- Phulvara (pholourie) – fritters made using urad flour powder. Known as dhuaans locally. Dhuaans batter is prepared with spices like black pepper and asafoetida. Small dumplings from batter are fried in hot oil. A hole is made in their centre using a wooden stick. It is served with chutney or dipped in yoghurt.
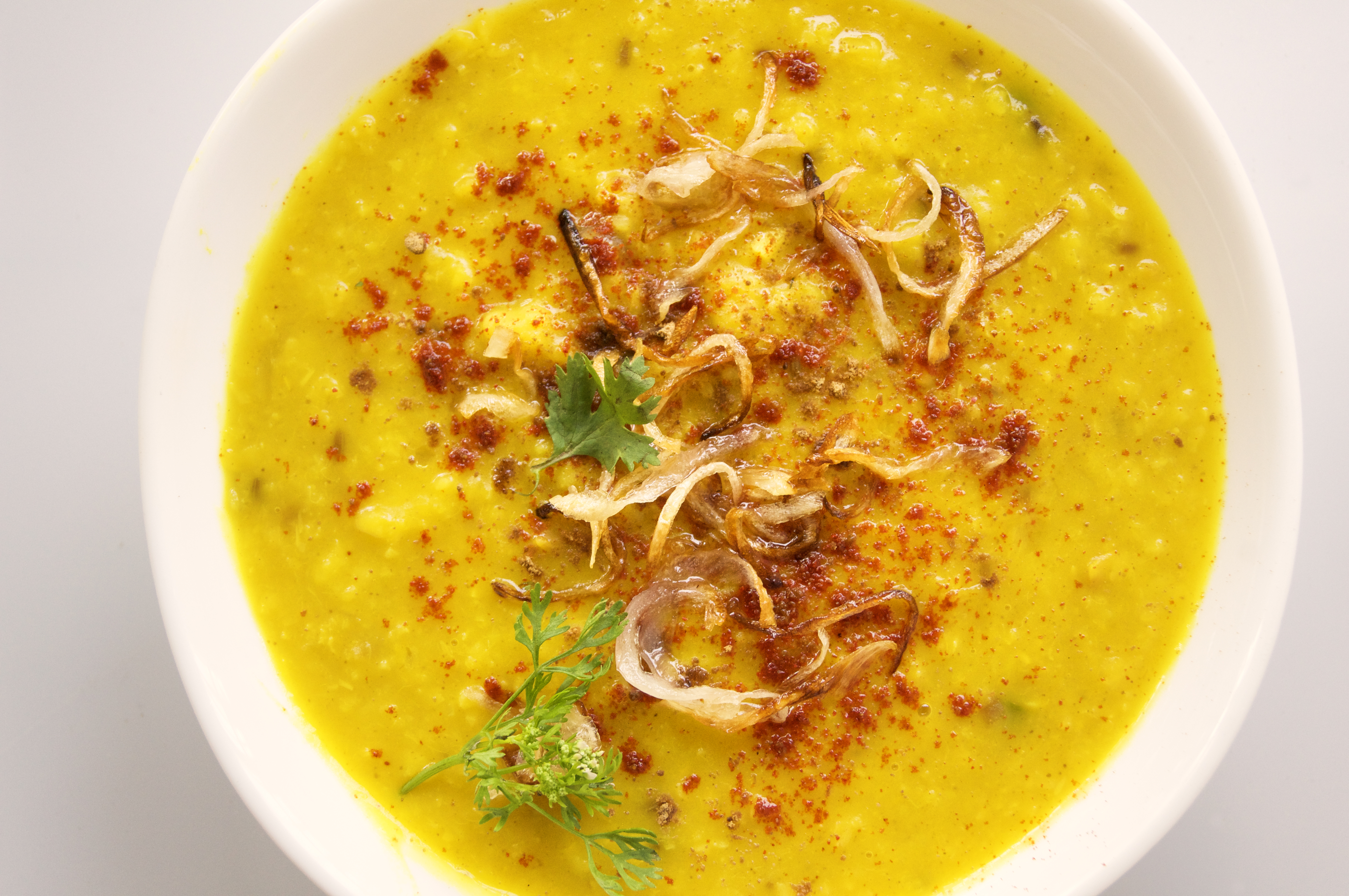
Dal is staple food in Bhojpuri cuisine

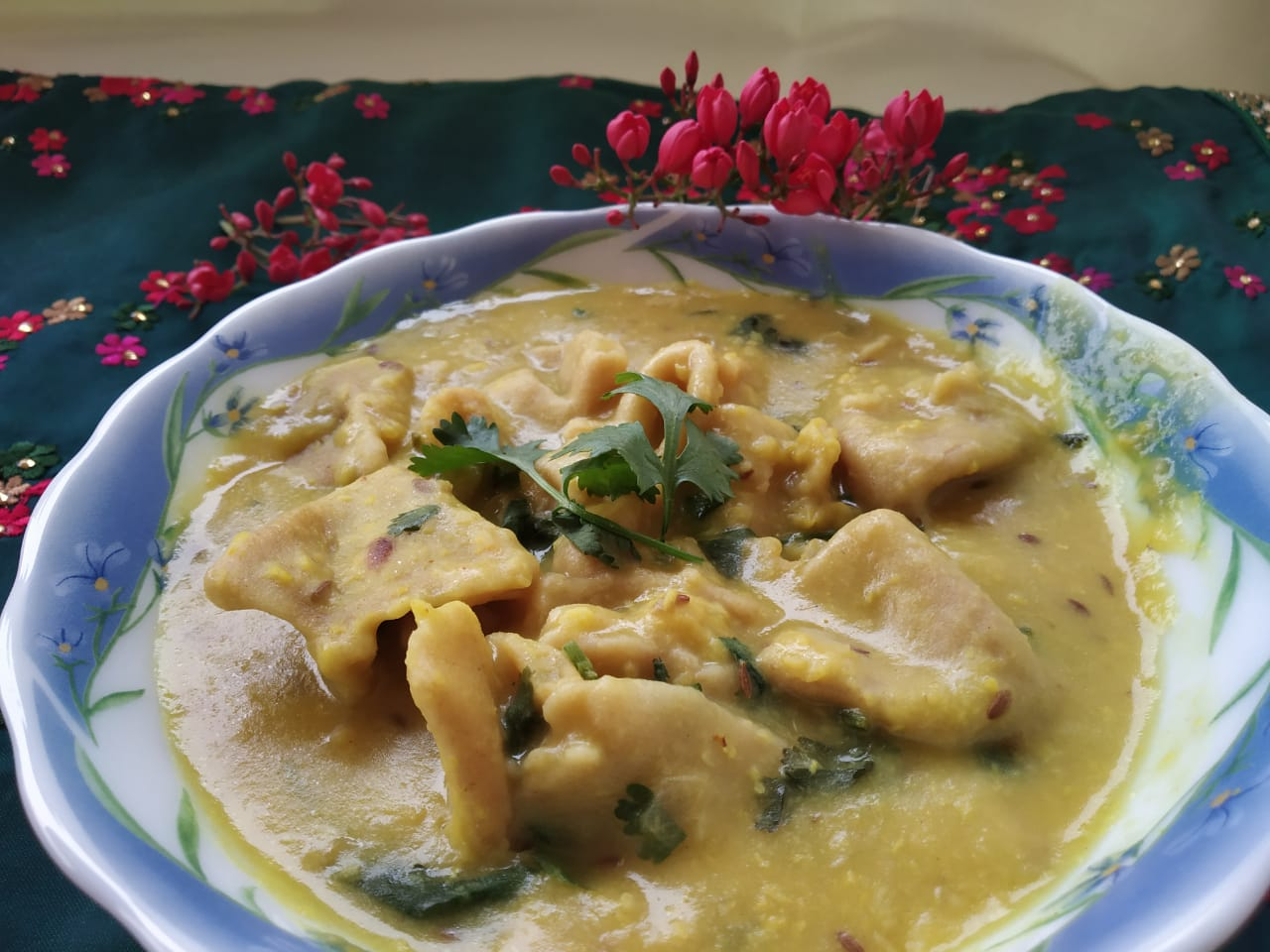
Bhojpuri dal pitthi / pithori

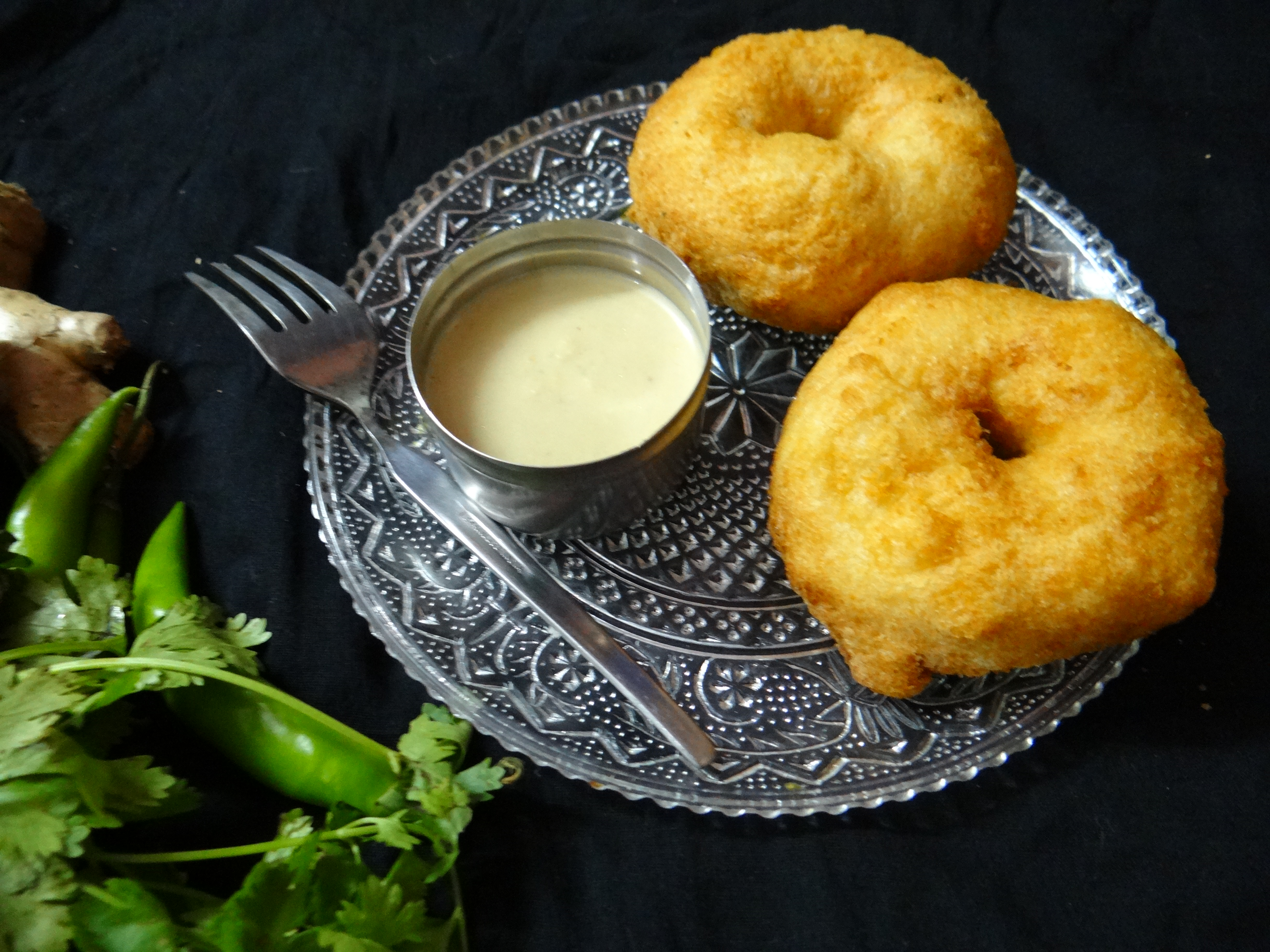
Phulvara

== Peas and beans ==
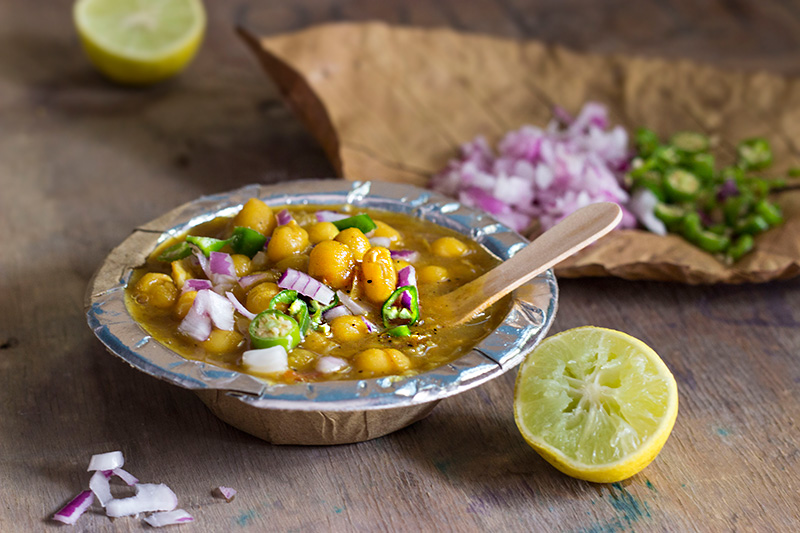
Ghughni

- Ghughni – a curry made of soaked and boiled peas or chickpeas. Variations of the dish use different types of peas or chickpeas, such as black gram, green peas, or white peas.
- Nimona – a spicy curry made by mincing peas or beans and sometimes even vegetables. Matar ka nimona is the most common variant. Nimonas are also made with kala channa and gobhi. It is a popular winter dish.

== Vegetable preparations ==
=== Preparation methods ===
- Bhujiya (stir-fried vegetables) – chopped vegetables stir-fried in vegetable oil with spices and condiments.
- Rasiya / rassewali bhaaji or jhol (vegetables with gravy or soup) – vegetables cooked with soup or gravy. For example, aloo rassewale or aloo jhol. Sometimes peas or chhena pieces are added to make aloo matar jhol or aloo chhena jhol.
- Bhariya / kalauji (stuffed vegetables) – vegetables like karela (bitter gourd), baingan (aubergine), parwal, bhindi (okra), or capsicum are stuffed with a special spice-mix and then cooked.
- Chokha (mashed vegetables) – vegetables like aubergines, tomatoes, and tubers are charred or barbecued and then mashed. They are then cooked with spices. Different variations of chokha include baingan chokha, aloo chokha and tamatar chokha. Aloo chokha is stuffed in flatbreads like paranthas to make aloo paranthas.
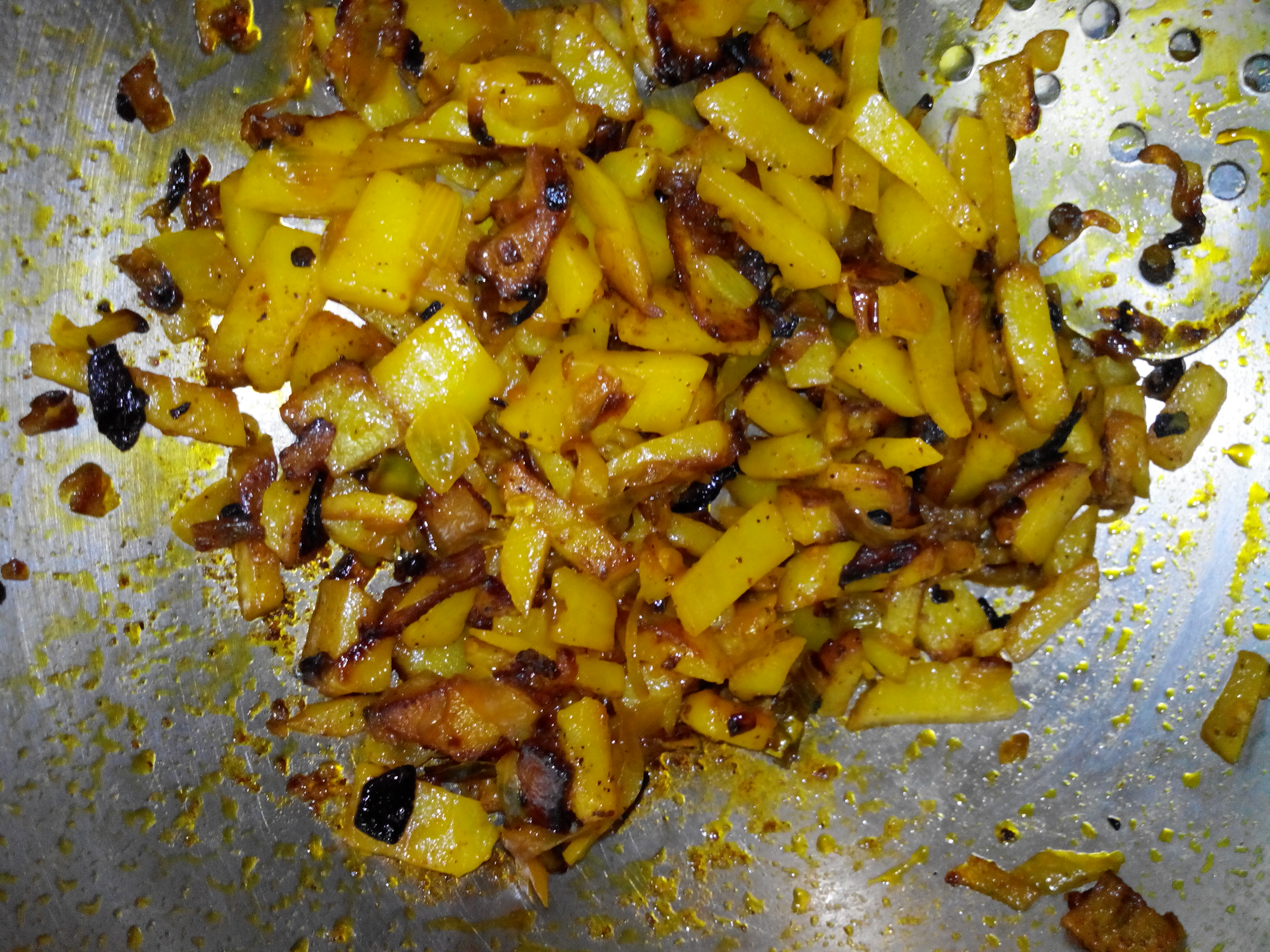
Alooi ke bhujiya

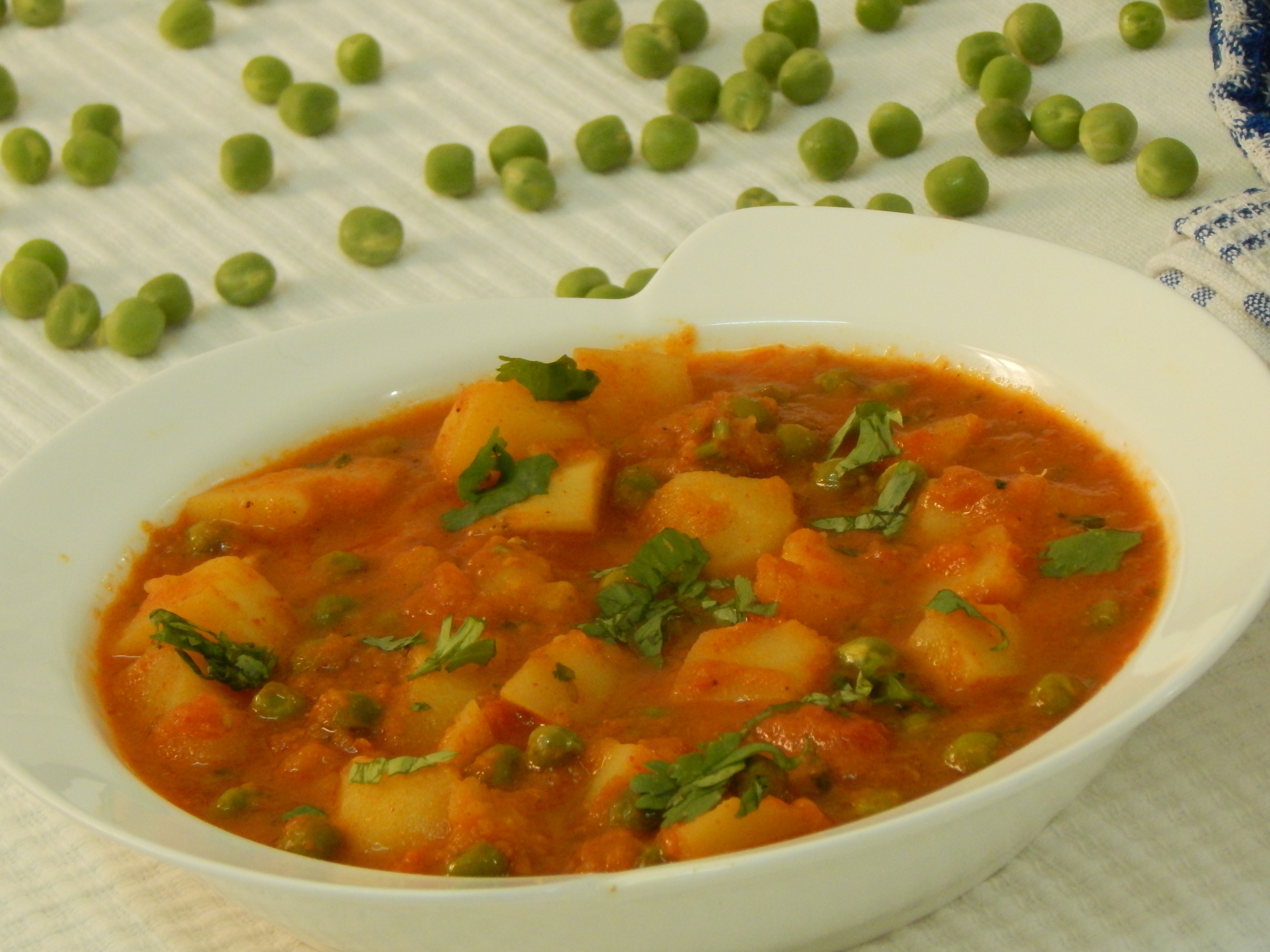
Alooi motar jhor

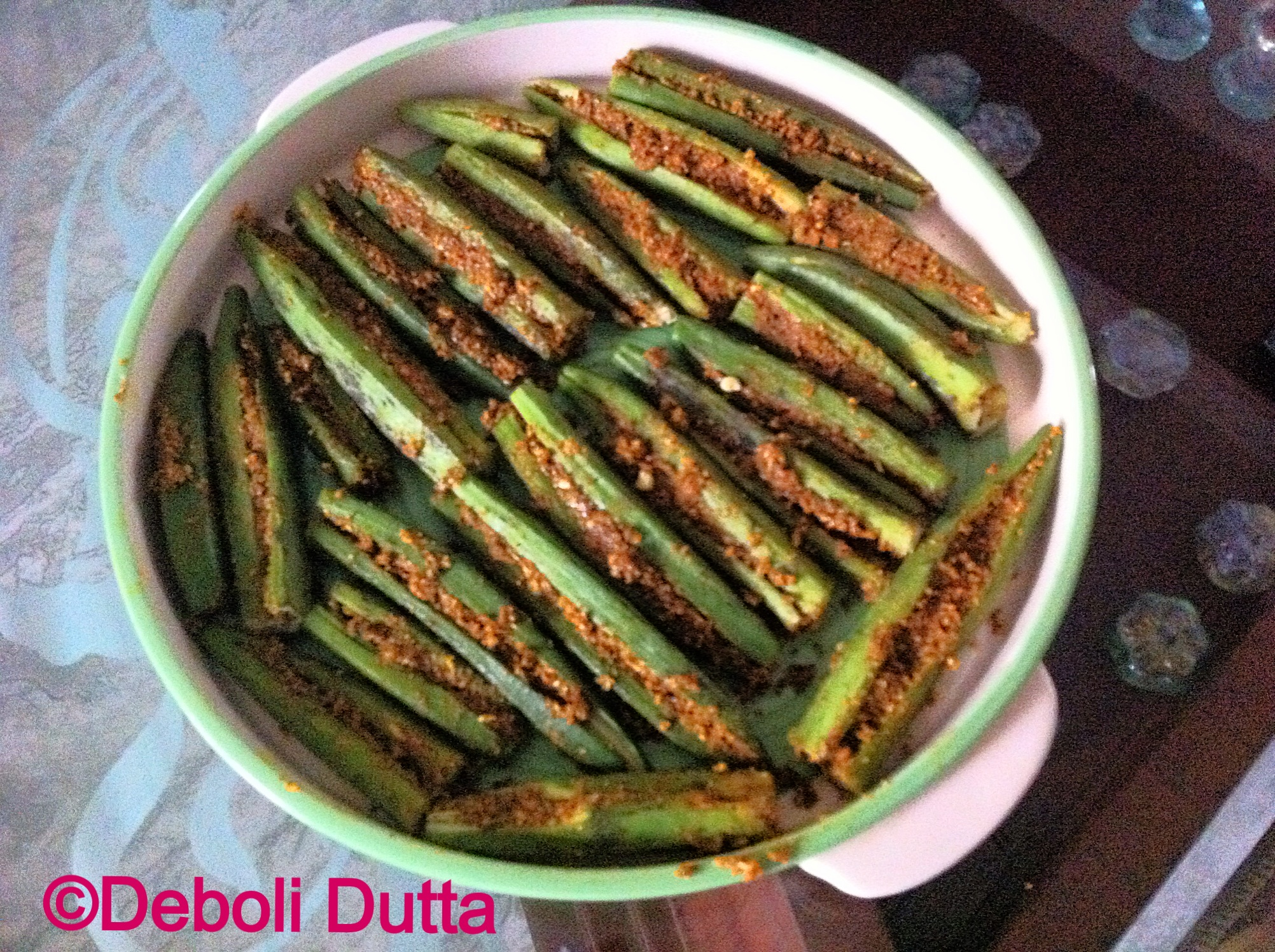
Bhindi ke Kalauji

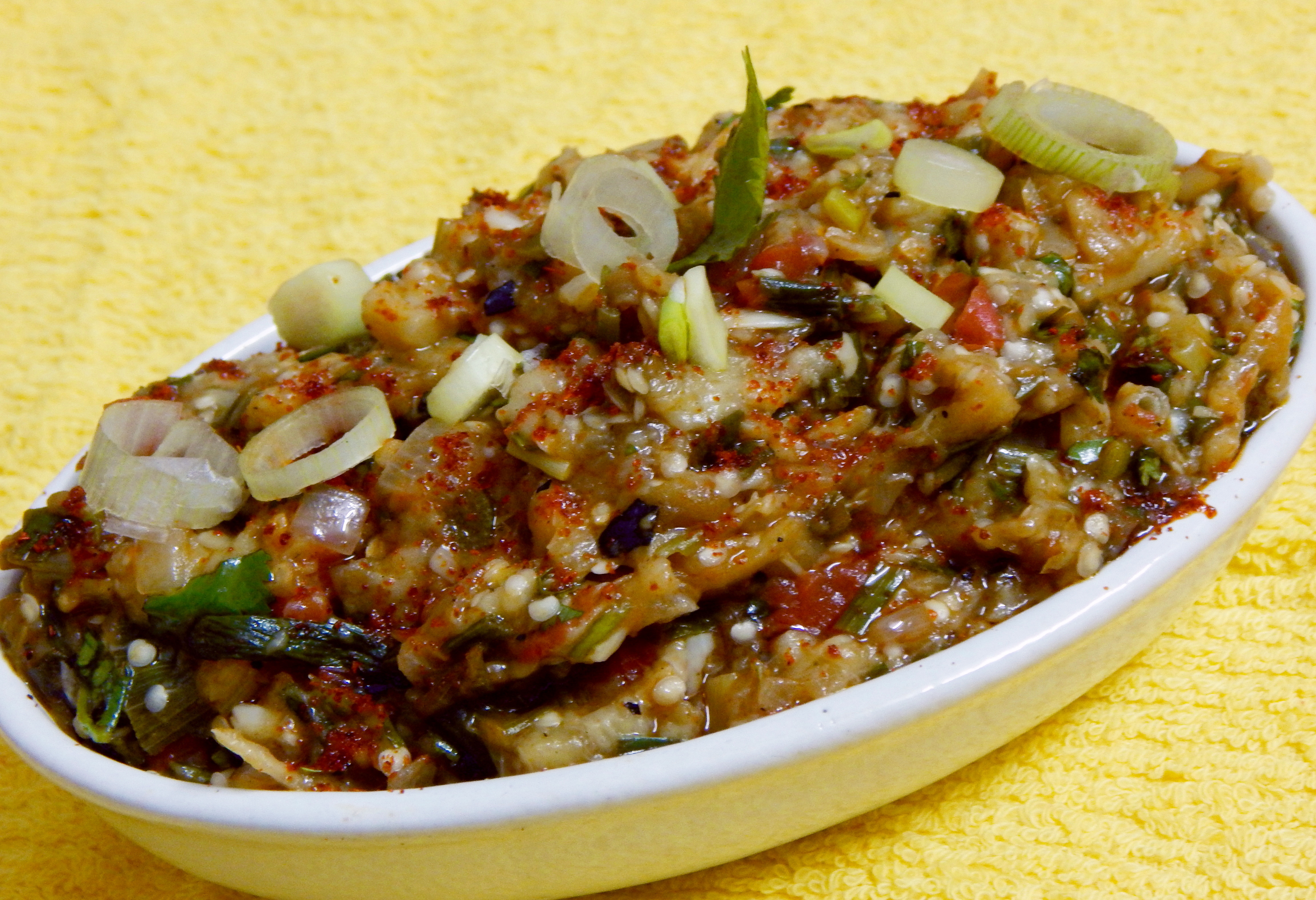
Bhaanta ke chokha

=== Common vegetable dishes ===
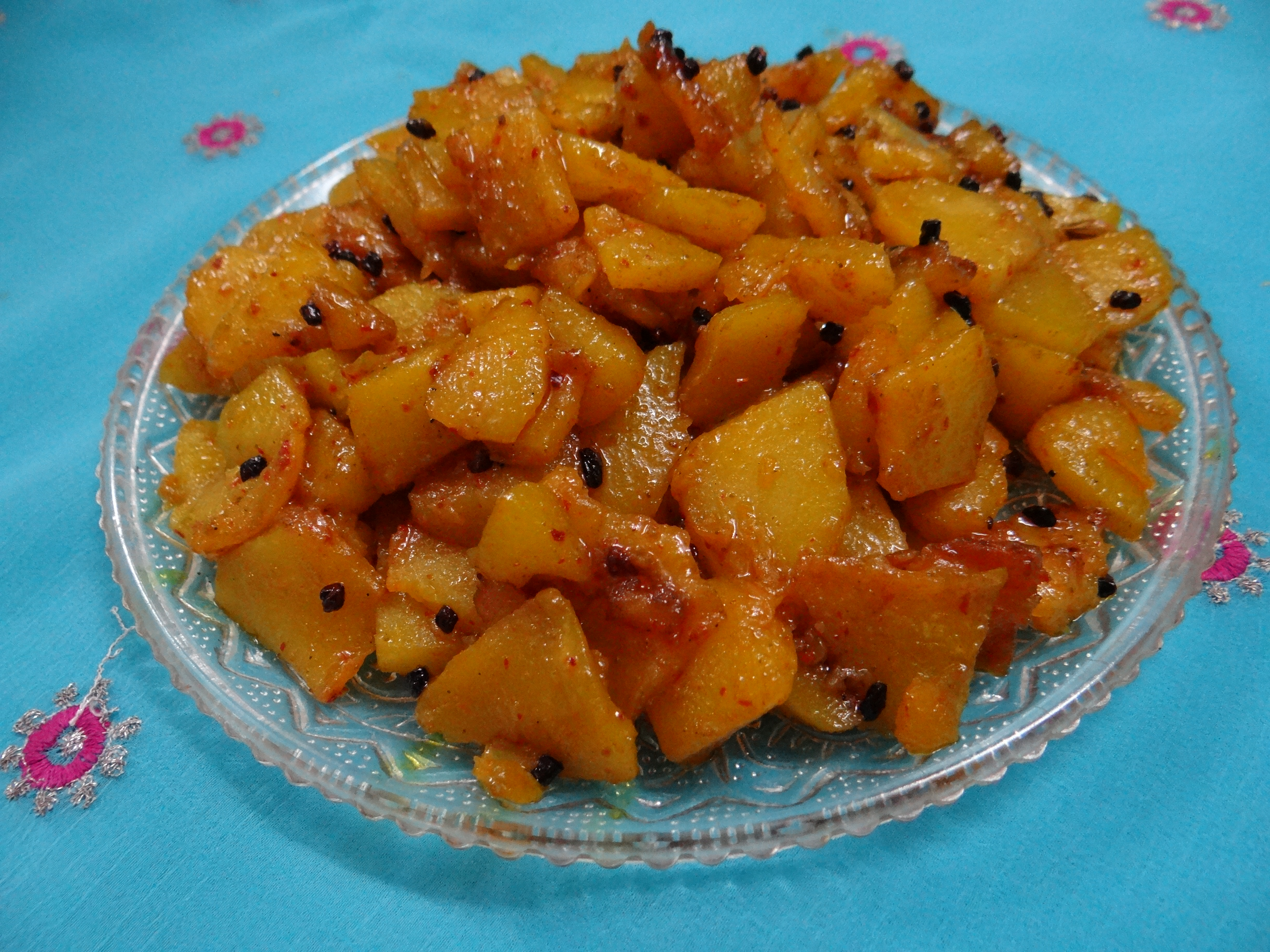
Panchphodan kohda is a special Bhojpuri preparation

- Panchphodan kohda – a local variety of pumpkin called kohda (from Sanskrit: Kushmanda) is cooked using aromatic spice blend called panch phodan. This dish is specially prepared for the festival Chhath Puja.
- Baigan adauri (baigan badi) – aubergines are cooked in mustard oil with onions, tomatoes, potatoes, peas, greens, spices, and Bhojpuri adauris, a special kind of urad dal badis. It is served with rotis, makuni, or paranthas.
- Nenua chana – sponge gourd variety called nenua is cooked with chickpeas. This dish is a balanced meal and consumed as a light meal for lunch or dinner.

== Leafy vegetable preparations ==
- Saag – refers to leafy green vegetable preparations. Leaves of various plants are used for preparing saag include chaana, bathua, methi, palak, sarson, matar, karmi, and noni. Chaana ke saag is most commonly prepared. It is often mixed with bathua leaves to enhance the flavour. Chavrai saag mixed with palak is seasoned with panch phoran. It is often prepared in marriages. Karmi ke saag is prepared on Rishi Panchmi festival. Sometimes, tubers (potatoes) and chhena (cottage cheese) are also added to saag.
- Girvanchh / rikvanchh – leaves of arua are coated with a batter of gram flour and spices. Coated leaves are then folded and deep-fried in hot oil like fritters. They are commonly consumed in monsoon season in the months of Shraavan.
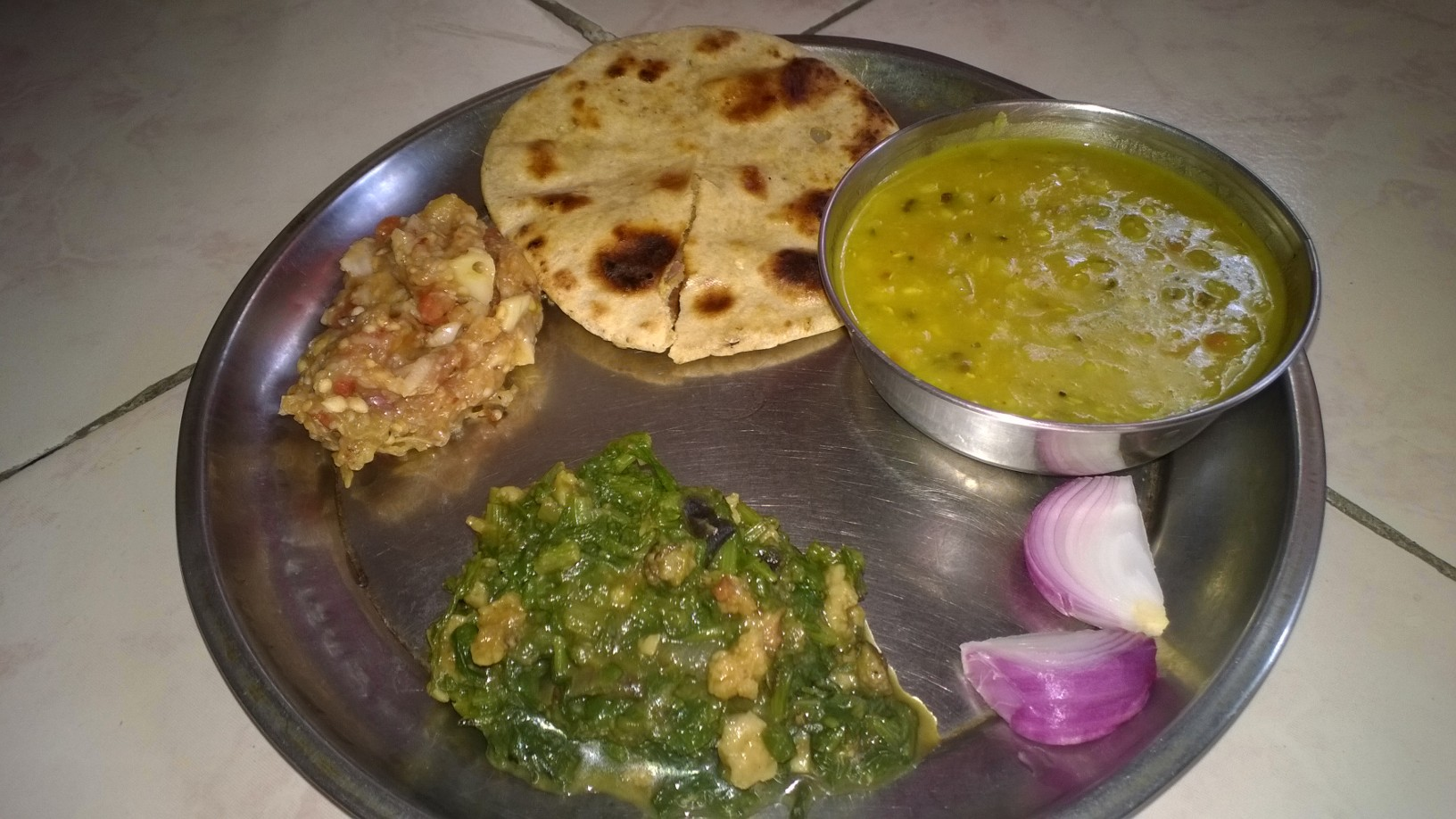
Bhabhari, dal, and choka with saag

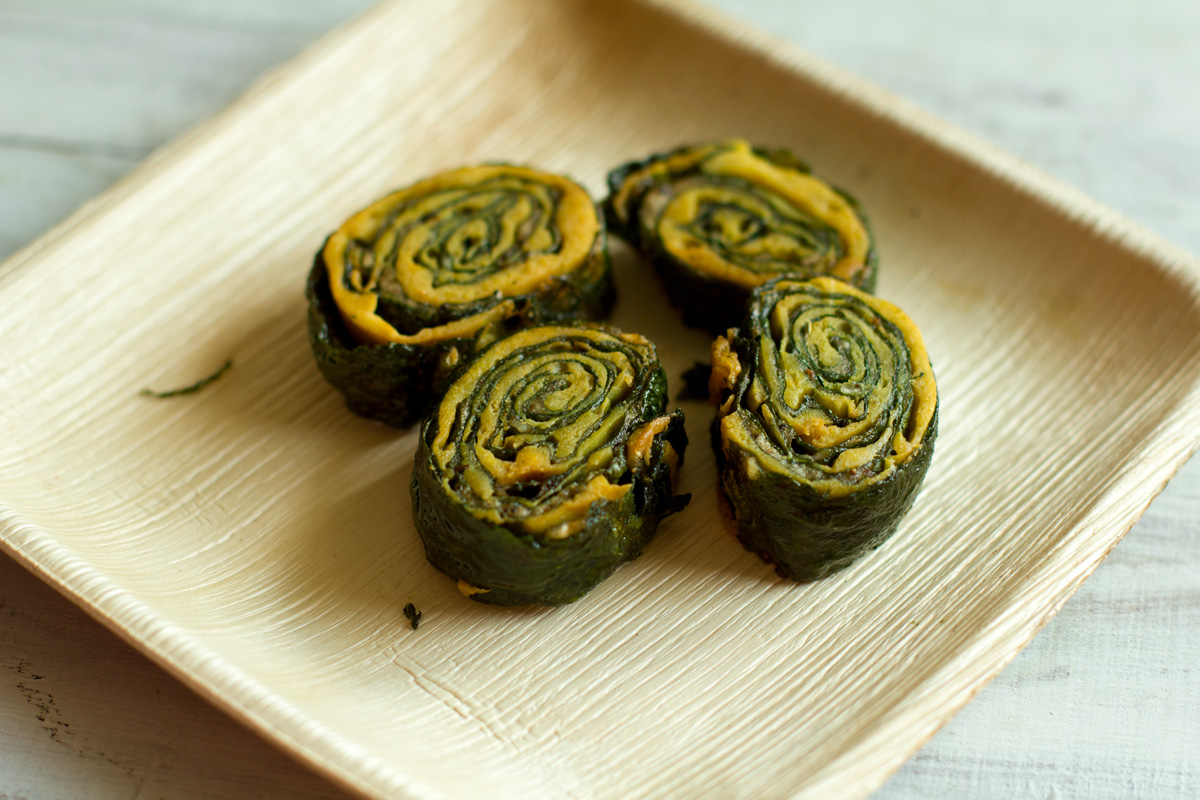
Girvanchh / rikvanchh

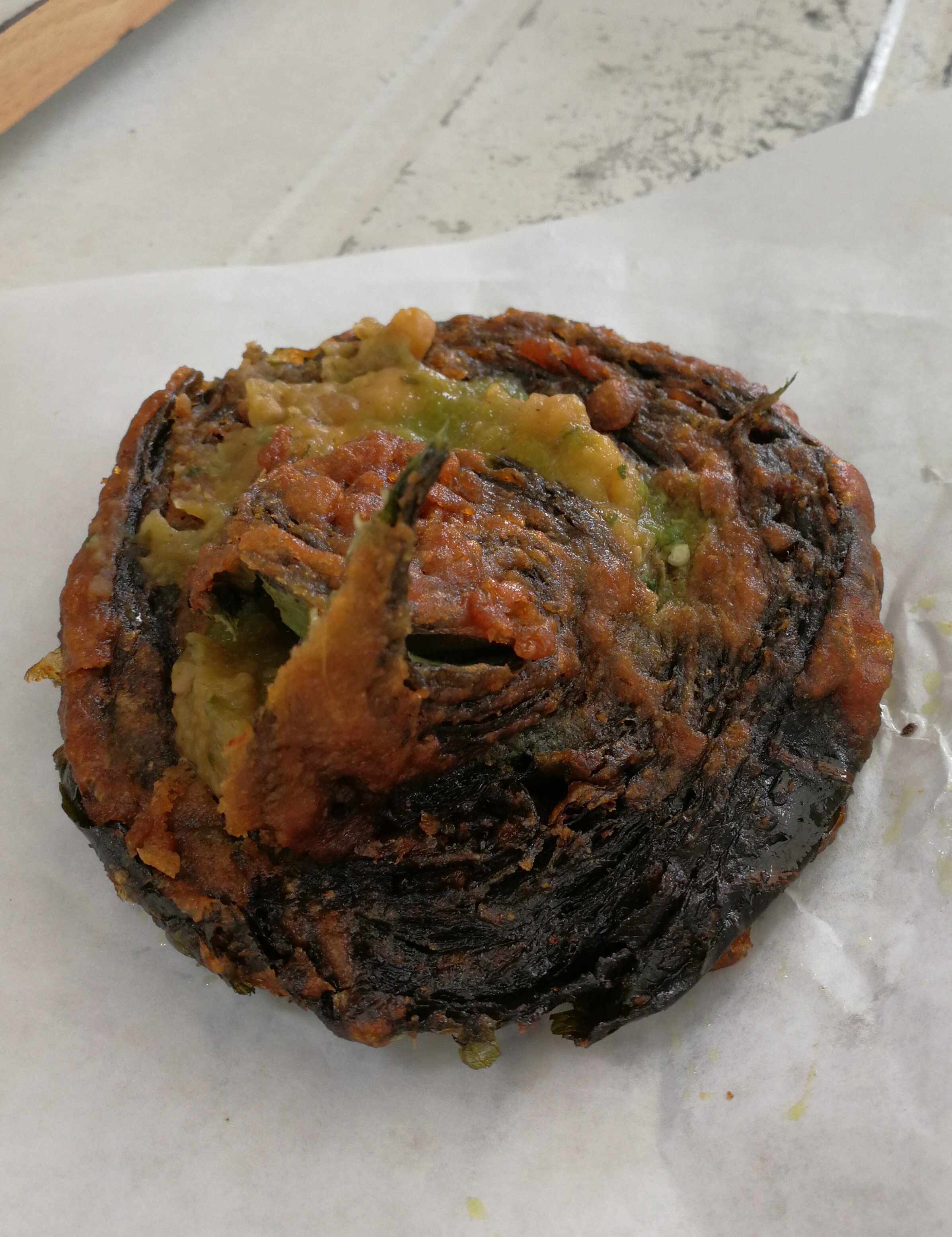

== Yoghurt-based dishes ==
- Kadhi badi – a yoghurt-based curry cooked with gram flour. Fritters called badi are added to it. It is eaten with rice.
- Dahi chura – yoghurt is mixed with flattened rice and eaten with jaggery or fruits. It is specially prepared for Makar Sankranti festival or as breakfast option.
- Dahi phulvari (dahi bada) – lentil flour fritters called phulvaris are prepared and soaked in flavoured yoghurt. It is specially cooked during marriages and Pitru Paksha.
- Dahi phulki (dahi puri) – miniature crisp puris / phulkis soaked in flavoured yoghurt and stuffed with mashed potatoes or chickpeas.
- Raita – these are prepared using adding crushed or minced vegetable to flavoured yoghurt. Vegetables used to make raita include lauki, kakkdi (cucumber), onion, and bathua. Often boondis (raindrop-sized fried gram flour balls) are also added to make boondi raita. Sometimes sweet raita is also prepared using bananas.
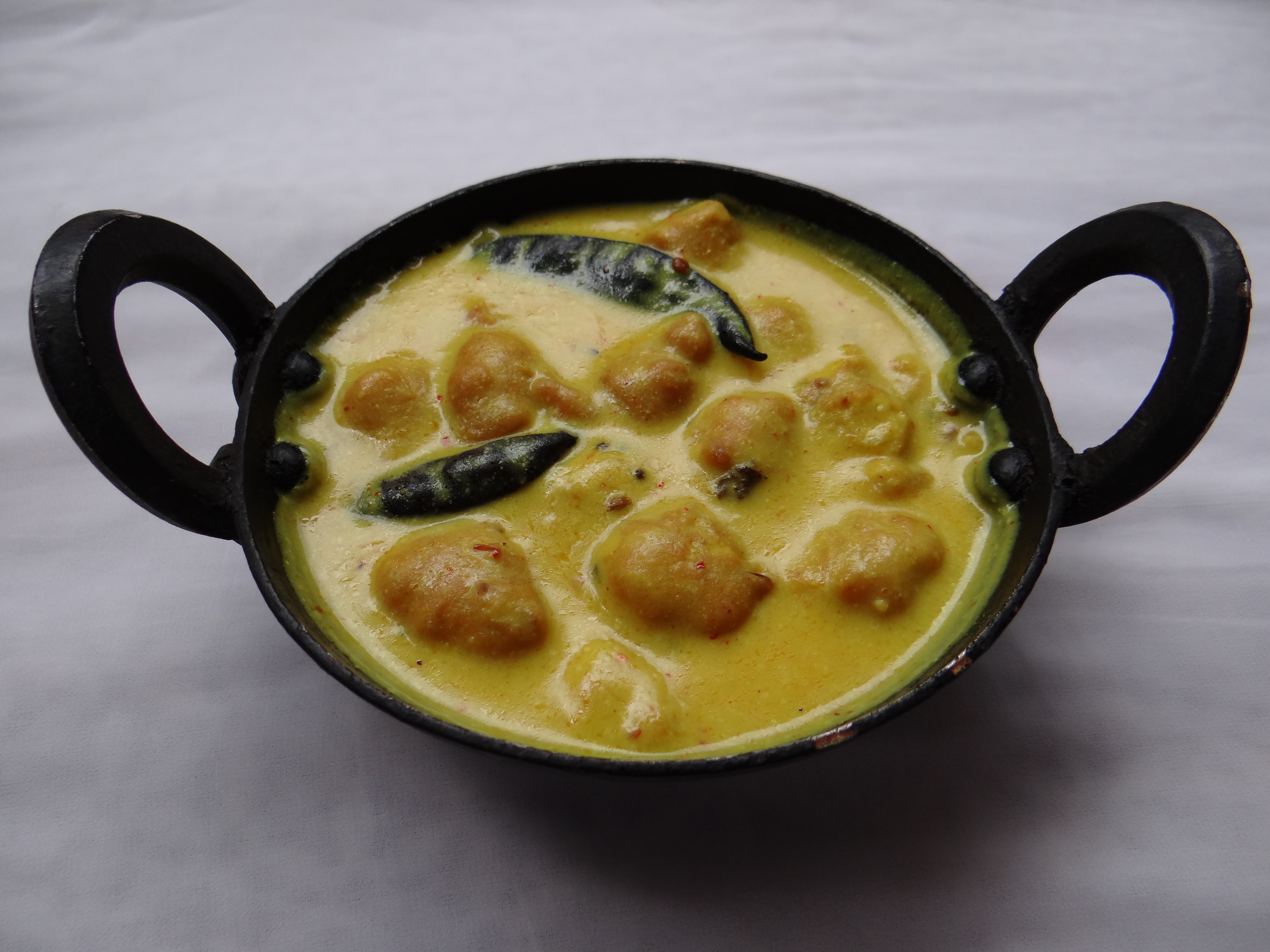
Kadhi badi

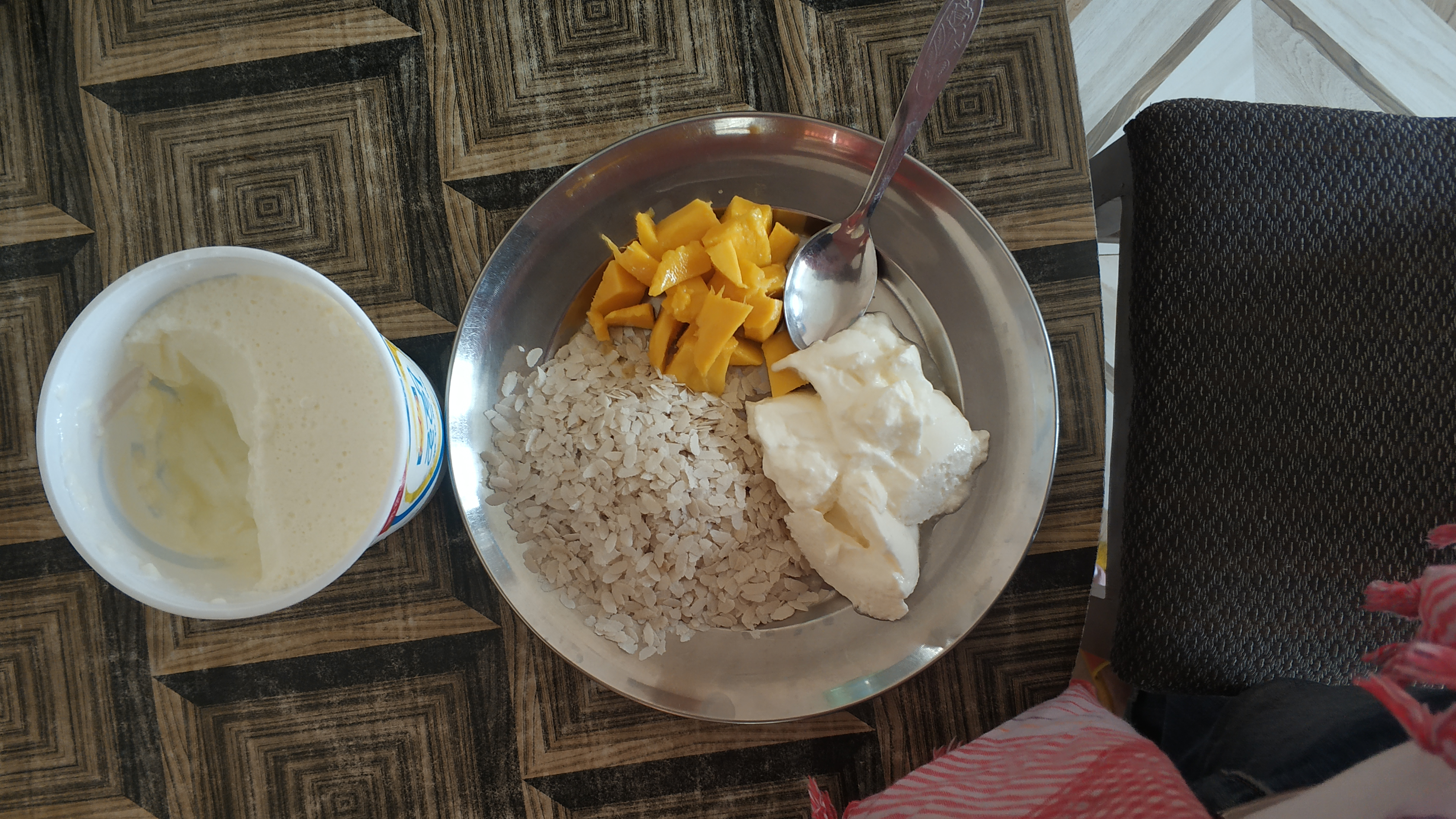
Dahi and chura served separately along with fruit

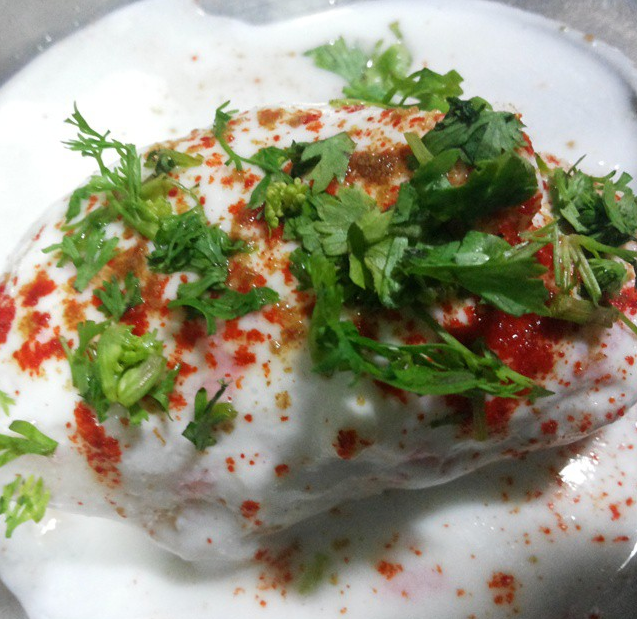
Dahi phulvari

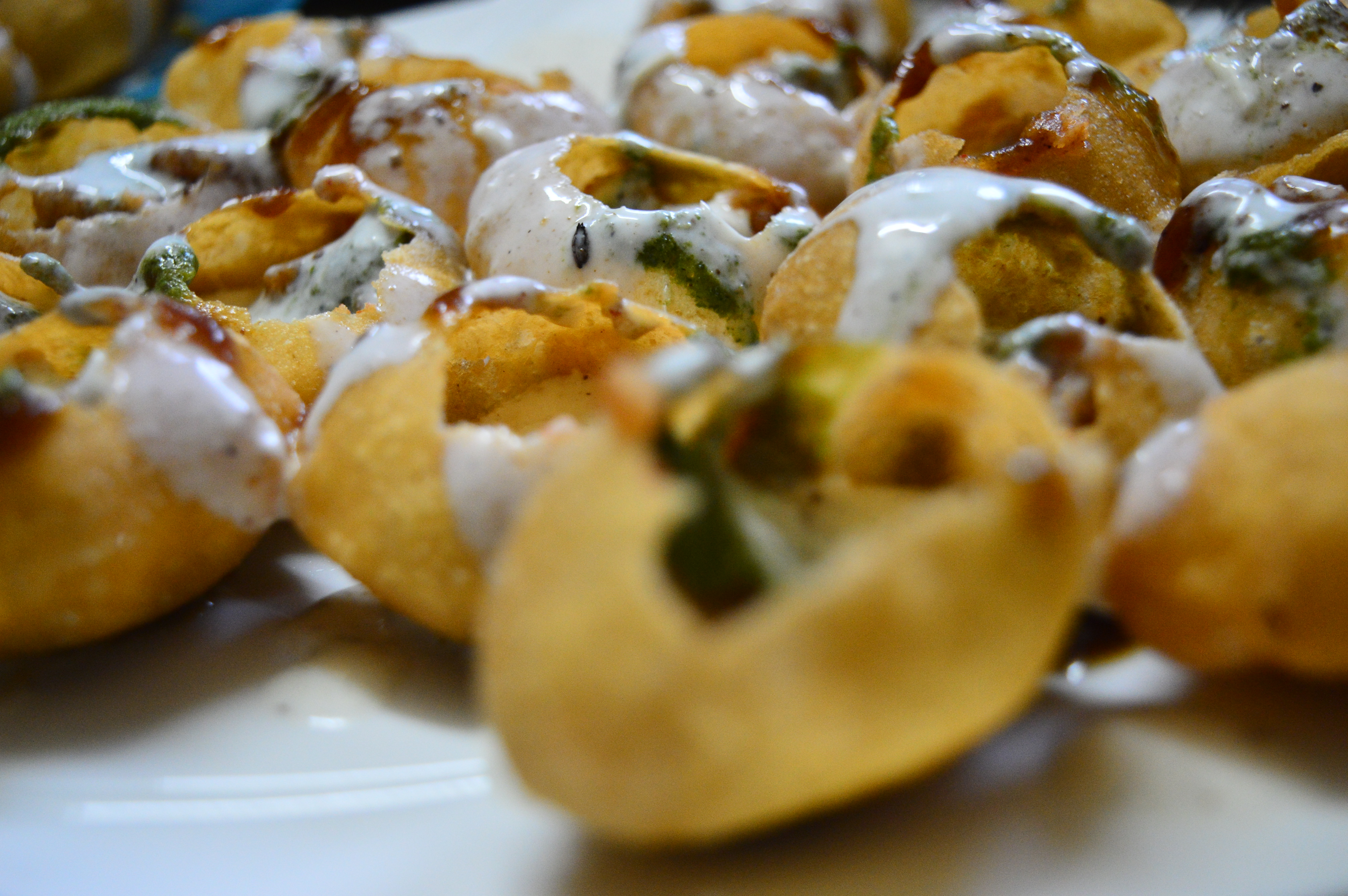
Dahi phulki, also known as dahi puri

== Staple diet ==
Wheat (ganhum गँहूम्) and rice (chaaur चाउर) are the staple cereal. Maize (makai मकई), barley (jai जई), and pearl millet (bajra बाजड़ा) are also often consumed in Bhojpuri cuisine.

Lentils (daal दाल), beans (lobiya लोबिया, rajma राजमा), green vegetables (tarkari तरकारी), leafy vegetables (saag साग), paneer (पनीर), fish (machhari मछरी), and meat (sikaar सिकार) are major constituents of the average diet. Mutton, lamb and chicken are eaten; beef and pork are avoided.

=== Breakfast ===
A heavy breakfast or a brunch is traditionally called kalewa while a light breakfast is called jalpaan. Breakfast in the region is bread-based and includes a variety made up of whole wheat or refined wheat flour such as roti, puri, parathas, especially sattu paranthas, chhena paranthas, and vegetable-stuffed parathas. These are served with saag-bhaaji, dahi (yoghurt), or raita. Breakfast is often accompanied with yoghurt-based drinks like mattha, chhachh, or banarasi lassi.

Makuni (or berahi) – this is a sattu-stuffed wheat bread somewhat between kachori and litti. Typically eaten for brunch.

Dhuska – a fried bread made from fermented batter of rice and lentils. It is accompanied with chickpea-based dish like aloo ghugni or aloo chhole.

Chana chabeni or bhuja / bhunjna – another typical breakfast of Bhojpur region. This dish is prepared on a big makeshift stove locally called a bhadsar. There is also a Bhojpuri song that mentions this dish:

Chana Chabeni, Ganga Jal jo devai karta
Kashi kabhu na chhodiye, Baba Vishwanath bhavan

One who makes available Chana Chabeni and Ganga Jal (holy water of River Ganga) easily, no one should leave the court of Baba Vishwanath (Lord Shiva), the Lord of the world

— Upadhyaya

Chiura matar or matar ka bhuja – a popular winter breakfast in Bhojpur region and is prepared by frying chiura (flattened rice) and matar (peas) separately and then mixed.

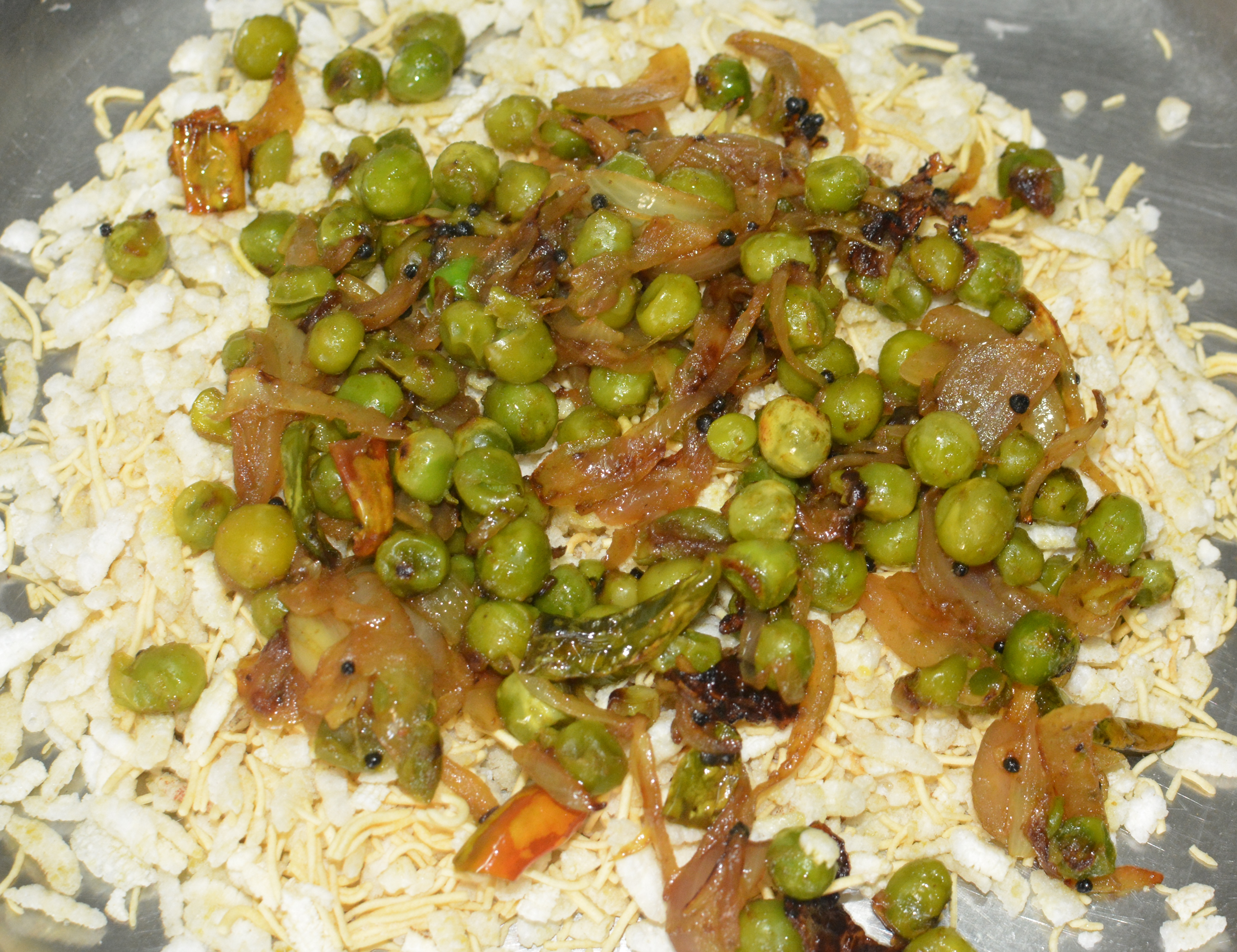
Matar chiura is a popular winter breakfast in Bhojpuri cuisine

Dahi chura with gud – flattened rice eaten with thick yoghurt. Gud (jaggery) tops the dish. It is specifically prepared on Makar Sankranti.

On special occasions lapsi-puri, kheer/sevai-puri, pua-dahi, or chhola-puri are commonly served as breakfast. A more common breakfast served as street food includes puri bhaaji, chana, kachori, and jalebi.

=== Lunch ===
Lunch is rice-based and includes dal (split lentils cooked with water, turmeric powder, and salt), sabzi korma (vegetable or meat cooked in rich but mildly-spicy and balanced gravy), chokha (boiled, roasted, and mashed potatoes, eggplants, tomatoes mixed with several herbs and seasoning), chutney (dhaniya ka chutney or coriander chutney is the most traditional chutney of the region with rich flavours of coriander, green chilli, garlic, lemon, and mustard oil), bhujia (pan-fried potatoes cut in finger shapes), pickles, and maybe roti instead of rice. On special occasions, several rice dishes like pulao or biryani are served.

=== Snacks ===
Generally served with tea in the evening. Most snacks are deep fried and salted. A common substitute is a handful and generous amount of dry fruits like kishmish (raisins), badam (almonds), khajur / chohara (dates), zameeni badam / chinia badam (peanuts), akharot (walnuts), chillgooza (pinenut), kaju (cashews), pista (pistachios), and anjeer (dried figs) soaked in milk.

=== Dinner ===
Dinner is also roti-based and is eaten with different vegetable preparations, such as:

- Bhujiya – stir-fried vegetables sauteed with spices and tubers. These are generally dry vegetable preparations, cooked without any gravy. Variations include parore aloo ki bhujia, bhindi aloo ki bhujiya, karele aloo ki bhujiya, kundru ki bhujiya, and chathail / kantola ki bhujiya.
- Rasili bhaaji – wet vegetable preparations which include some gravy or soup. Examples include aloo gobhi ki rasili bhaaji, kathal ki rasili bhaaji, and aloo parwal ki rasili bhaaji.

Sometimes, roti is broken into a bowl of hot milk (which can be sweetened) and then eaten; this is called doodh-roti. Sometimes, litti is grilled over charcoal or is baked in a clay oven and then eaten with chokha or murga (chicken korma). Dinner may change at special occasions and can be replaced by meat dishes like korma (meat with gravy), kebab, or kofta (meatballs with spicy gravy) and is served with tandoori roti (harder than the usual pan-baked roti) or naan and salaad (salad).

== Satvik khana ==
There is a tradition of eating satvik khana (sentient food) in the holy city of Banaras. It is a lacto-vegetarian diet and excludes the uses of garlic and onion.

== Non-vegetarianism ==
Since ancient times, peoples of this region have consumed non-vegetarian dishes along with vegetarian diets. Non-vegetarian dishes are seen as delicacies and are eaten with great relish. It has always been a custom to serve guests a non-vegetarian dish at least once during their stay.

After the arrival of British, poultry became popular and now has become one of the largest contributors in meat-yielding animals. Still, mutton is regarded as the superior meat over poultry and fish.

Fish has also been popular since ancient times due to a large number of big and small rivers flowing through the region. Freshwater fish and small freshwater prawns also form a good proportion in total meat consumption.

Some non-vegetarian dishes popular in Bhojpuri cuisine include:

- Pulao gosht/gos
- Champaran meat
- Azamgarh Mutton Do Pyaza
- Machhari Bhaat
- Ghongha

== Essentials ==
=== Spices and condiments ===
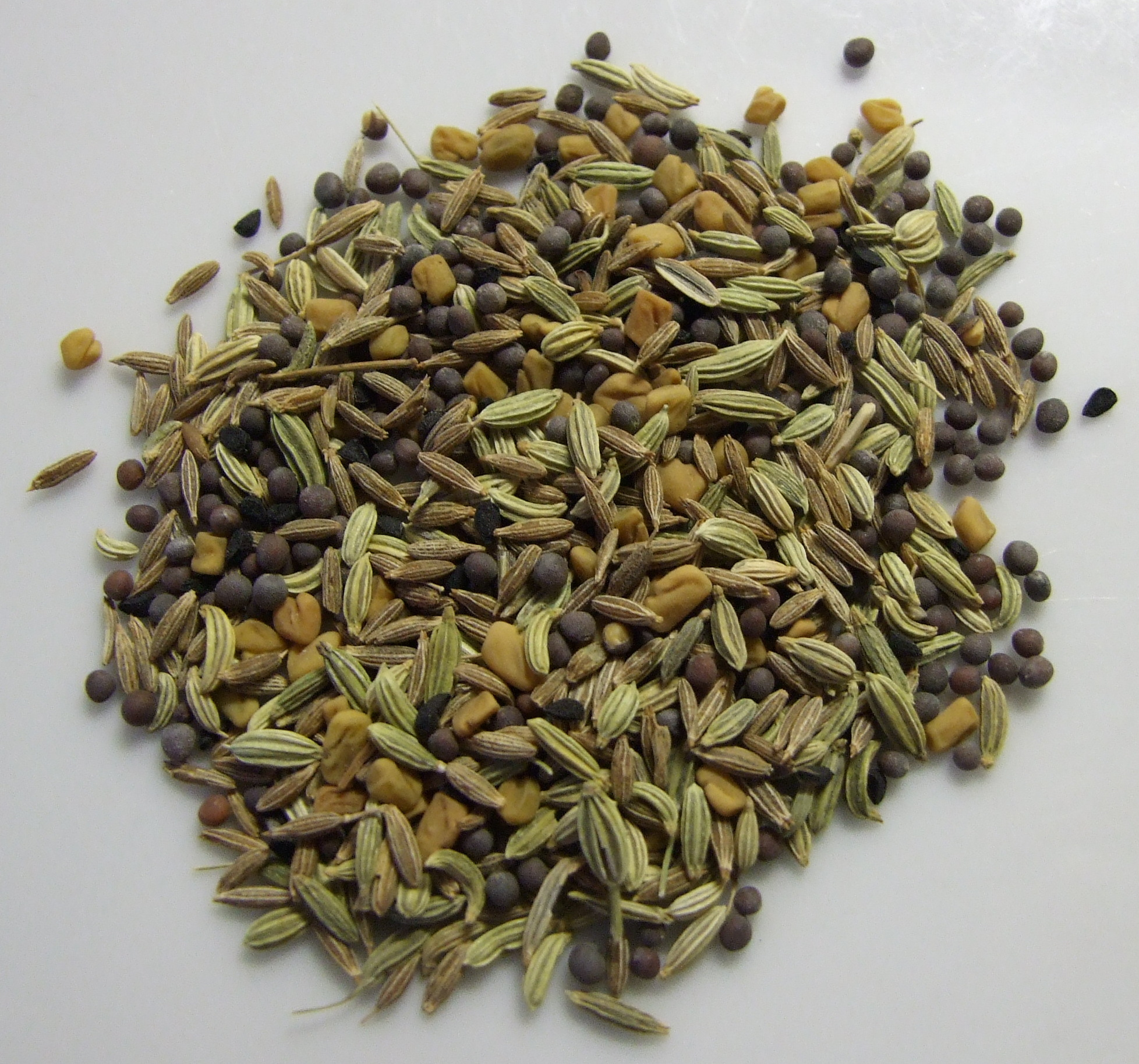
Panch phodan: the five spice mix used in Bhojpuri cuisine

Spices are common but are used in moderation; sometimes dishes just contain two or three kinds of spices. This imparts a balanced aroma and taste without overloading the spices and making the dish very spicy and hot.

Panch phoran is a mix of five spices commonly used in Bhojpuri cuisine. The five spices are jeera (cumin), radhuni (a strong spice), methi-dana (dry fenugreek seeds), saunph (fennel seeds), and kalaunji (nigella seeds). This spice mix is the essence of the Bhojpuri dish panch phoran kohra, a sweet and spicy pumpkin-based curry flavoured using these five spices.

Other spices used in Bhojpuri cuisine include:

- Cumin seed (jeera)
- Caraway seed (shahi jeera)
- Cinnamon (darchini)
- Aniseed (saunf)
- Black pepper (golmarich/golki)
- Asafoetida (heeng)
- Garam masala
- Red chili (lal or laal maricha)
- Green chili (hariyar maricha)
- Cardamom (elaichi)
- Black cardamom (badki elaichi)
- Nutmeg (jaifal)
- Mace (javitri)
- Saffron (kesar)
- Flax seed (tisi)
- Dried pomegranate (daadim)
- Carom seed (jawaain)
- Fenugreek seed (methi)
- Dried fenugreek leaves (kasuri methi)
- Onion seed (mangraila)
- Mango powder (amchoor)
- Dried mango (khatai)
- Coriander (dhania)
- Rose water (gulab jal)
- Turmeric (hardi)
- Salt (noon)
- Black salt (kariyakka noon)
- Rock salt (sendha noon)
- Poppy seed (khas khas)
- Clove (lawang)
- Mustard (sariso)
- Bay leaf (tejpaat)
- Sesame seed (til)
- Olive (jaitun)
- Nigella seed (kalaunji)

=== Herbs, oils, and nuts ===
- Green coriander leaves (hariyar dhania patai)
- Mint leaves (podina patai)
- Parsley (jafari)
- Holy basil (tulsi)
- Dill (sowa)
- Ginger (aadi)
- Dried ginger (sonth)
- Garlic (lahasun)
- Onion (pyaz)
- Fenugreek leaves (methi ke patai)
- Tamarind (imli)
- Date (khajur)
- Lime (limu)
- Lemon (nimbu)
- Mustard oil (sarson ke tel)
- Olive oil (jaitun ke tel)
- Ghee ("ghiu")
- Butter (maakhan)
- Hydrolysed vegetable oil (dalda)
- Almond (bedaam)
- Peanut (chinia bedaam)
- Walnut (akharot)
- Cashew (kaju)
- Dried fig (anjeer)
- Date (khajur)
- Dried apricot (jardalu)
- Dried plum (baiir)
- Pistachios (pista)
- Raisin (kismis)
- Black raisin (sultana)

=== Tools and techniques ===
- Handi (हांडी)
- Kadahi (कराही)
- Tava (तावा)
- Tandoor (तंदूर)
- Taslaa (तासला)
- Degchi (extra-large degchi is called deg or dig) (देगची)
- Banarsi Dum technique (बनारसी दम तकनीक)

=== Common vegetables ===
- Potato (alooi)
- Cauliflower (phool kobi)
- Tomato (tamatar)
- Brinjal (baigan / bhaanta)
- Okra (bhindi)
- Long beans (bori / boro)
- Calabash (lauka)
- Zucchini (tiroi)
- Cabbage (banna kobi)
- French bean (faras bean)
- Pumpkin (kohda)
- Moringa (sahjan)

== Festival foods ==
Regional festivals are celebrated by preparing particular dishes to be shared with all communities irrespective of religion or caste.

=== Khichdi/Sekraat ===
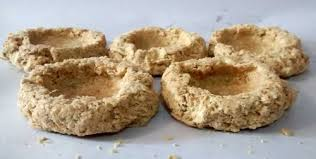
Tilkut is prepared on the festival day of Makar Sankranti

Also called Makar Sankranti or Tilkut Sankranti, it is the first festival of the year. On this day, at morning, people eat til ke laddu, tilwa, tilkut, and laai. At lunchtime, the combo of chura, dahi, and gud is eaten. In the evening, special khichdi is served along with melted ghee, pickles, papar, chokha, chutney, and dahi.

=== Vasant Panchmi ===
This festival celebrates the last day of the winter season and welcomes the spring season. On this day, lapsi is made of semolina and is eaten with puri.

=== Holi/Hori/Paguwa ===
Holi is one of the largest festivals of the Bhojpuri region. On this day, meat dishes and intoxicating drinks and sweets (thandai/bhang halwa) are the main attraction. In large families, a bakra or khasi (male goat or sheep) is bought a few days before the festival and is slaughtered on the day of festival. The backstrap and shoulder parts are cut into small pieces and marinated in garlic, onion, and few spices and then skewered over charcoal to make bihari seekh kebab. Liver (kaleji) is cut into small pieces and is pan fried with a little salt and pepper. This is a delicacy for children. The remainder of the meat is cooked as korma and eaten with pua (a batter of wheat flour and sugar with various dry fruits, deep fried in ghee). Meat dishes are eaten all day and shared with neighbours and relatives. In addition, a very sweet halwa made of dry fruits, condensed milk, and bhang is prepared.

In the evenings, people enjoy pakora, gulab jamun, chhole, dahi-baras, and kadhi-bari served with boiled rice.

=== Shivraatri ===
On this day, people who were fasting (especially women) eat phalahar (a fruit diet).

=== Ramnavami ===
Another major festival of the region. A night before this festival, women cook kheer, puri, dal-puri, and gulgula. After worshipping the next morning, these are eaten as offerings throughout the whole day.

=== Sattuani / Sattua Sankranti ===
This festival falls on Mesh Sankranti. A sattuani thaali is prepared on this day, which includes foods with cooling properties like sattu ka panna, aam ka tikora, kakkdi (cucumber) with roasted jeera powder and rock salt, and alsi ki chutney. A cup of jirwani (buttermilk) also accompanies the sattuani thaali.

=== Janmashtami ===
This occasion is linked with special laapsi of singhara (chestnut) and khas-khas (poppy seeds).

=== Hartalika Teej ===
A day before the festival, women dedicate their whole day in preparing perukia. On the day of the festival, they offer this dessert and fruits to the god and after worshiping, it is eaten as an offering. It can be eaten for several days as it does not require preservation or refrigeration.

=== Navami / Navraatar and Dassahara ===
Satvik khana is eaten on all the nine days of Puja. On the tenth day (Dussehra), special dishes like puri, kachori, dum-aloo, chhole, jalebi pua, bari-kadhi, and dahi-bara are cooked. The evening after "Ravan-Dahan", there is a tradition of eating meat.

=== Diwali ===
Diwali is one of the largest festivals of the region and people enjoy eating numerous kinds of sweets and savouries, including gujia, anarsa, and ladoo. One sweet always associated with Diwali is cheeni ke khilone.

=== Godhan ===
There is a tradition of preparing Pitha on the occasion of Godhan in Bhojpuri region. It is prepared with soaked and then ground rice and pulses.

=== Chhath Puja ===
This is the largest festival of the region. It is celebrated for four consecutive days. On first day ("Nahay Khay"), after the holy bath in river, lauka-bhaat and chana ke dal is eaten. On second day ("Kharna"), people dip in holy Ganges and take the water home to cook rasiyaao and roti, which is eaten as Prasad at night. The next day ("Dala Chhath"), thekua, kasar, belgrami, and poori are prepared by the women who are fasting. After both the "Arghyas", on the fourth day, these sweets along with several fruits and dry fruits are served as Prasad and eaten for several days.

== Dishes ==
Some dishes popular in Bhojpuri cuisine include:

- Channa and chhole – chickpeas cooked in spicy gravy
- Rajma – red kidney beans cooked in mildly spicy and creamy gravy
- Lobiya – black eyed bean cooked in lightly spicy gravy
- Dal makhani
- Dal maharani
- Dum aloo – potatoes cooked in spicy gravy with Benarasi Dum technique
- Pitha
- Urad ka daal
- Chokha – roasted tomatoes, roasted aubergine, roasted potatoes, roasted brinjals mixed with garlic chilli and raw mustard oil
- Raita – yoghurt dips
- Kofta – meat, vegetable, or paneer balls cooked in spicy gravy
- Maakuni – paratha stuffed with cooked potatoes or yellow/green peas or sattu
- Aloo mutter
- Kadhi-bari – fried chickpea flour dumplings cooked in spicy yoghurt
- Shami kebab
- Bihari kebab – pieces of meat marinated in onion, garlic, and salt then skewered in seekh and then grilled over charcoal
- Gulab jamun
- Pua – sweetened wheat flour batter with nuts and raisins poured in a karahi of hot oil and fried
- Petha – (locally called bhatuapag) a sweet white flavoured candy made up of ash gourd
- Murabba – pickled fruits
- Mardua and thekua – fried biscuits of wheat flour flavoured with aniseed
- Anarsa
- Dalpoori – poori stuffed with boiled and mashed dal
- Litti chokha – bati stuffed with sattu
- Nimona – made of green peas
- Ghugni – pan fried and seasoned green peas or sprouted black gram
- Dahi chooda – curd and chooda
- Daal pithouri (dalpiththee) – wheat flour stiffly kneaded, rolled thick, and cut into different shapes, though a flower shape is common. It is then cooked with dal and seasoned with salt and pepper.
- Gojha – stuffed with daal and cooked in steam
- Gujhiya
- Mal Pua
- Padukiya
- Laktho
- Bharwa
- Nimki
- Kachauri
- Sev
- Dalmot
- Chana ke saag
- Sarson ke saag
- Bathua ke saag
- Palak saag
- Khesari ke saag

== Desserts ==
- Khurma
- Malaiyo
- Anarsa
- Balushahi
- Thekua
- Gaja
- Rasmalai
- Rabri
- Doodh pitha
- Falooda
- Lawanglata
- Chandrakala
- Khaja
- Khajhulee
- Meethe samose
- Batasha
- Halwa – a confectionary made generally of soozi (semolina), gajar (carrot), besan (chickpea flour), atta (whole wheat flour), singhara (chestnut), doodhi (bottle gourd), badam (almond), khas khas (poppy seeds).
- Sohan halwa
- Laddoo – made up of besan, motichur, bundi, gond, mewe
- Barfi
- Gulab jamun
- Murabba
- Petha
- Kheer
- Sheer korma
- Sevai
- Kalakand
- Pera
- Sohan papdi
- Methi ke laddoo – enjoyed especially during winters. It is prepared by mixing powdered fenugreek seeds and powdered flax seeds with ghee, jaggery, nuts, and raisins.
- Tilwa – enjoyed especially during winters.
- Til ki laai
- Tilkut
- Parwal ki mithai
- Jalebi
- Belgrami – a dry sweet made up of maida, sugar, and ghee.
- Pedukia / murki – a dry sweet made up of maida and stuffed with mixture of khowa / fried soozi (semolina, sautéed in ghee) and sugar, and then fried.
- Ghujhia – pedukia dipped in sugar syrup.
- Laktho – a dry and hard sweet made of maida and jaggery and seasoned with aniseed.
- Malai kofta
- Pua
- Malpua
- Sev-bunia (bundia)
- Kulfi
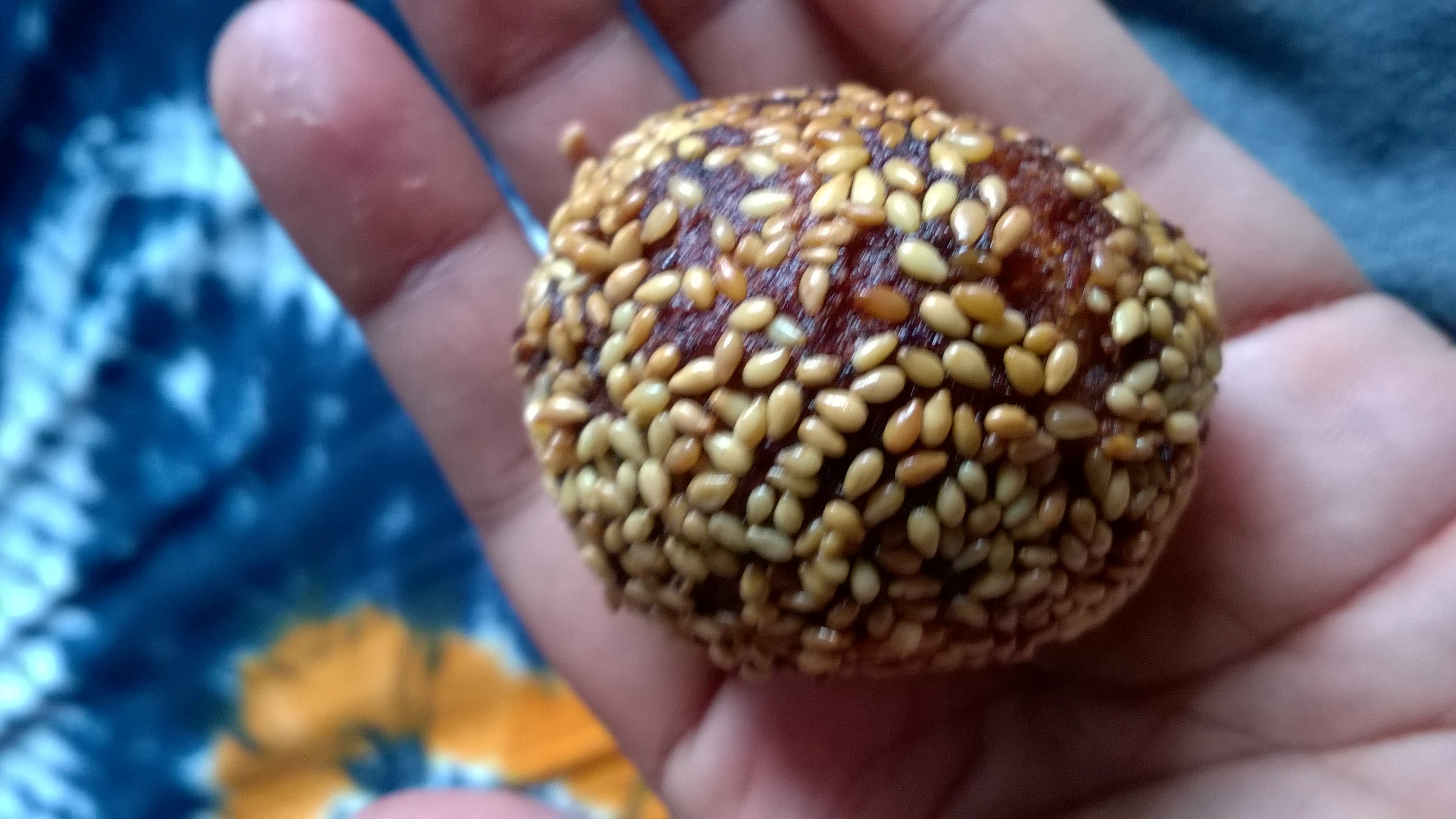
Anarsa

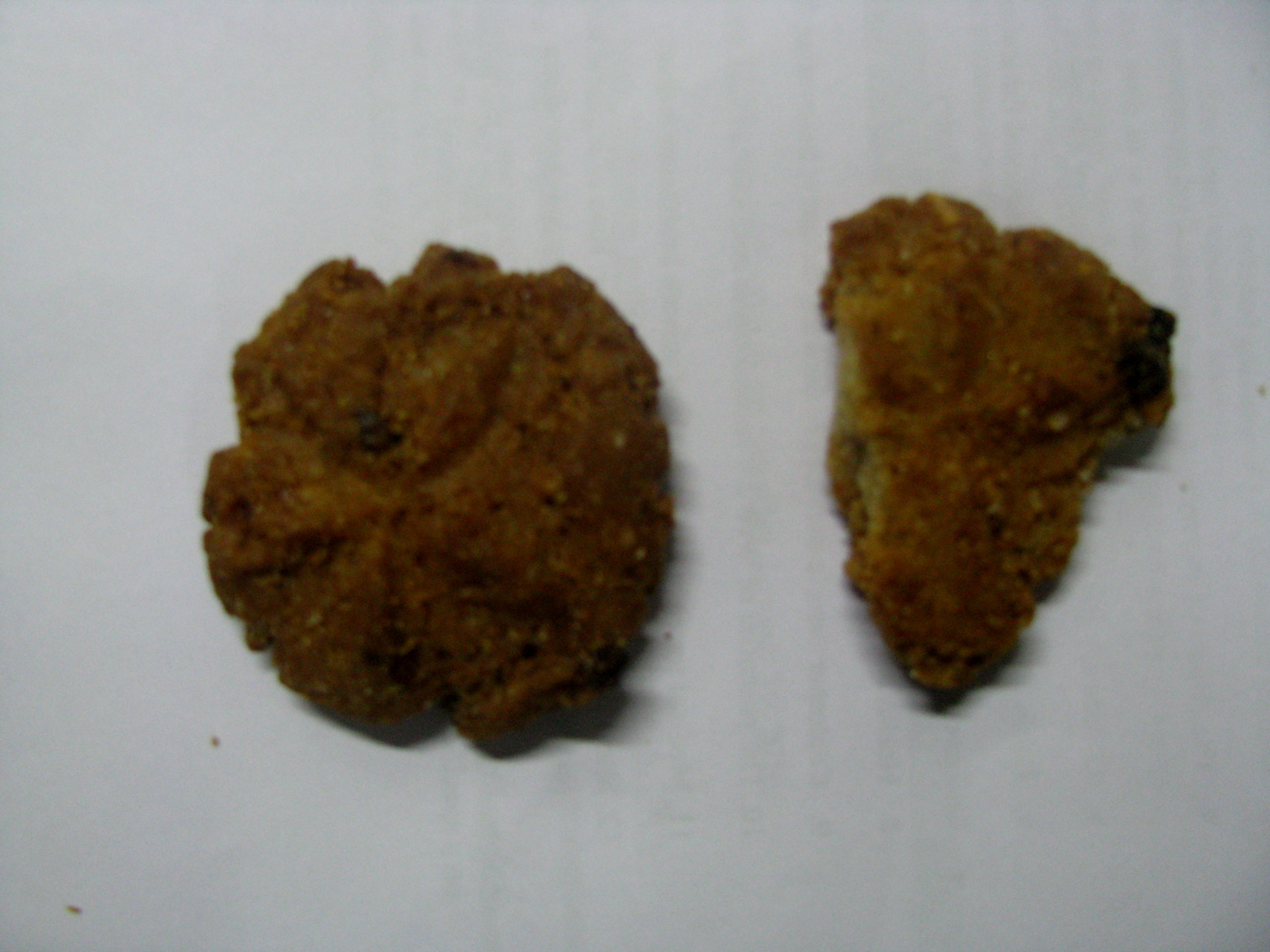
Thekua

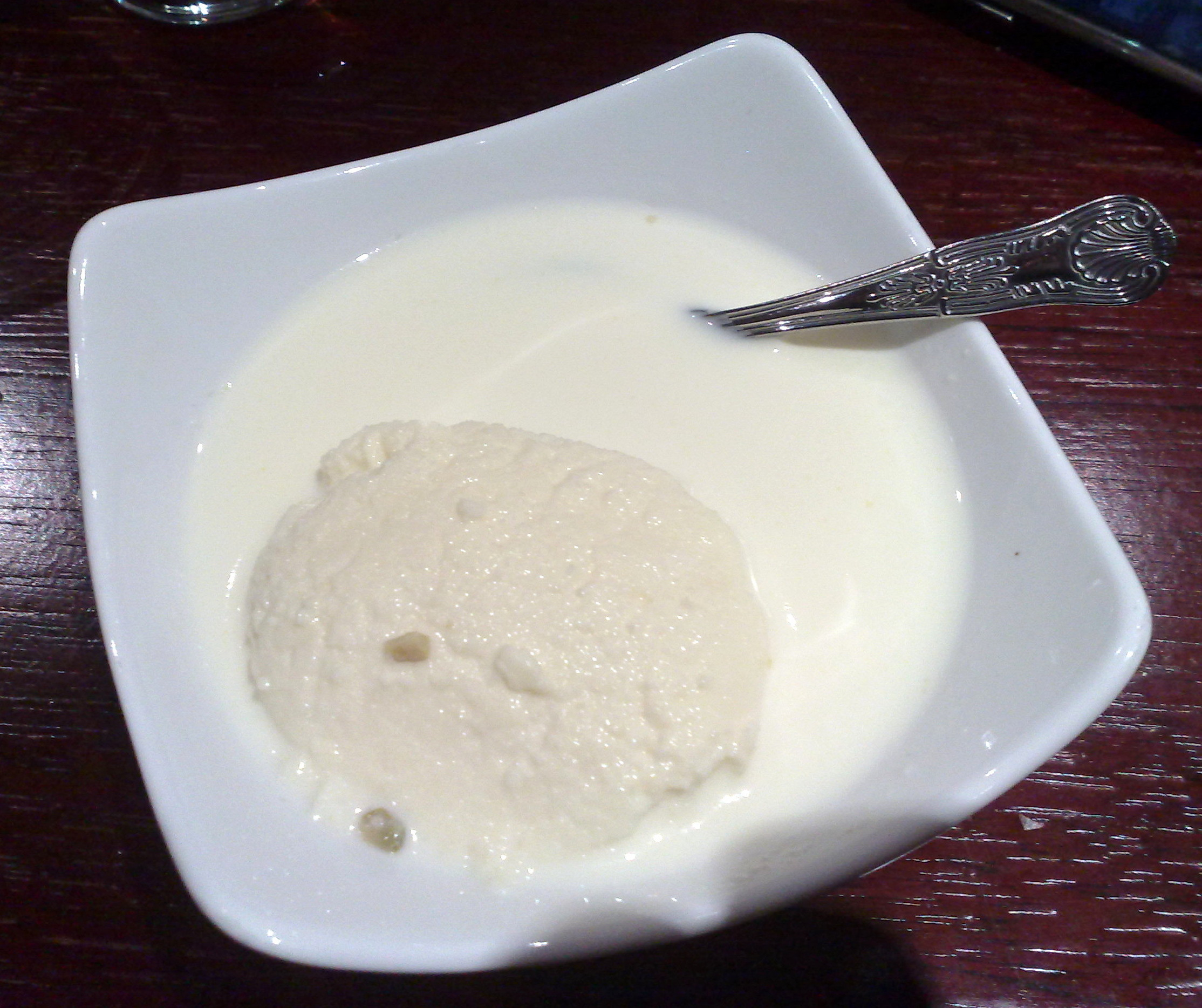
Rasmalai

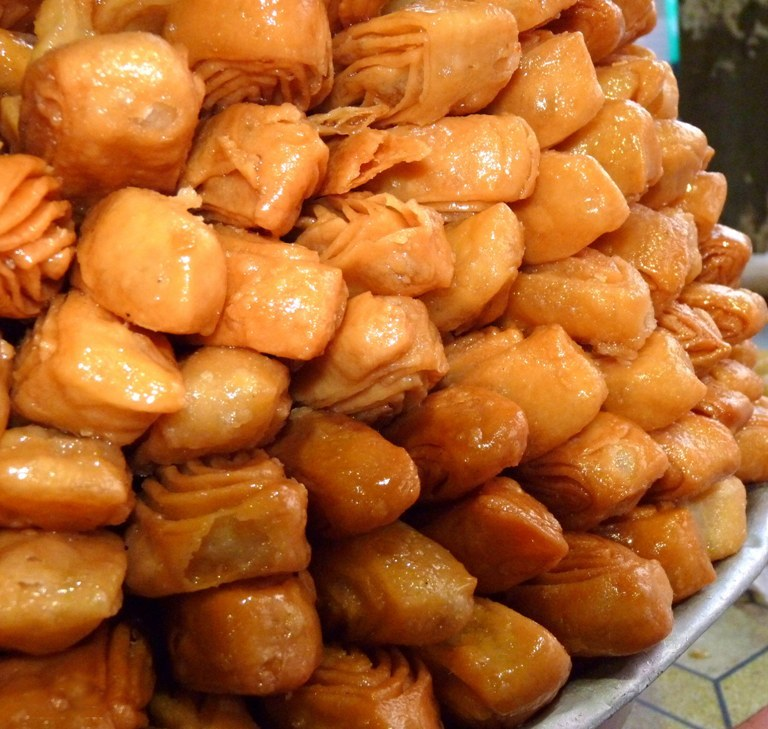
Khaja

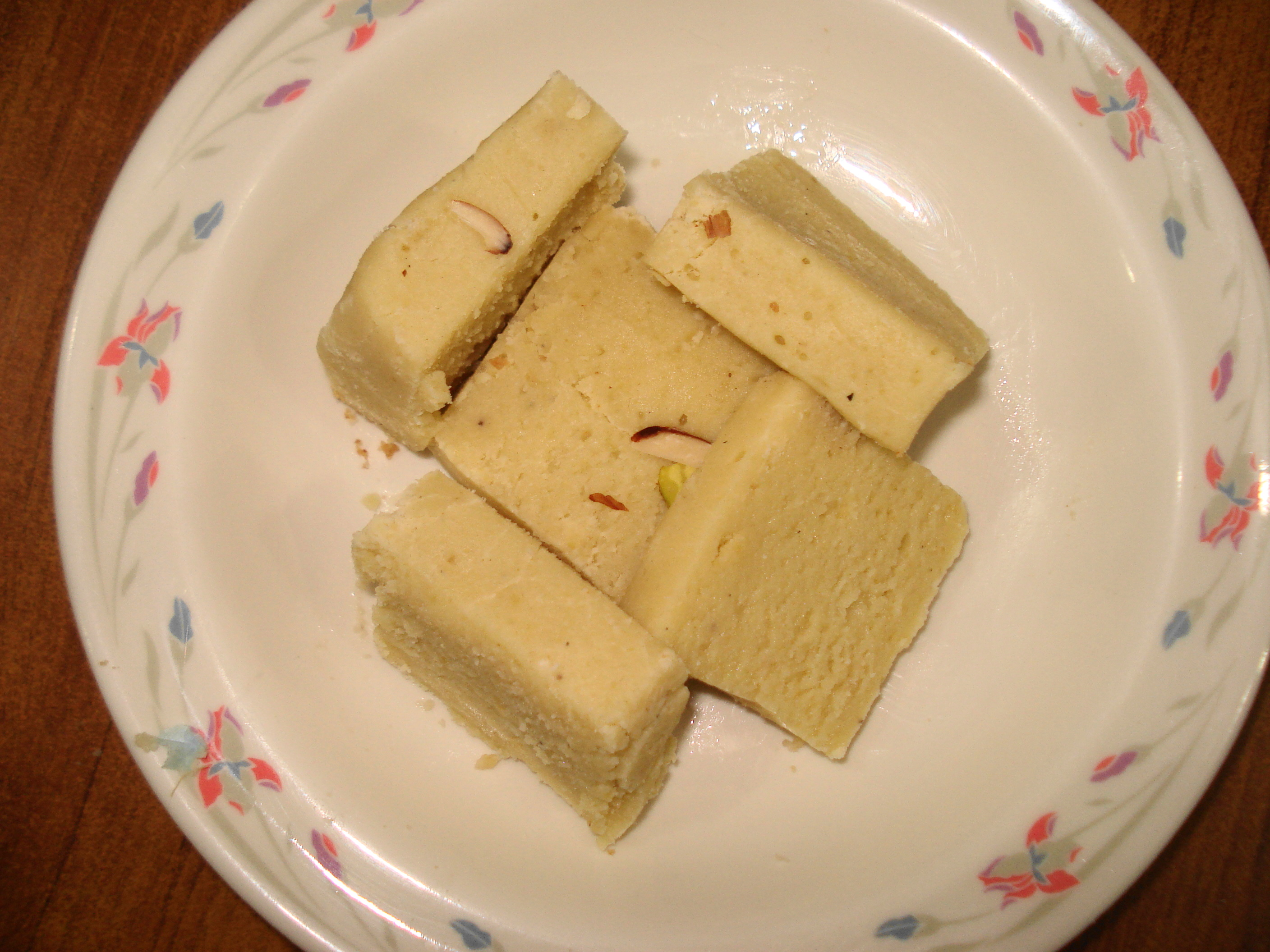
Burfi

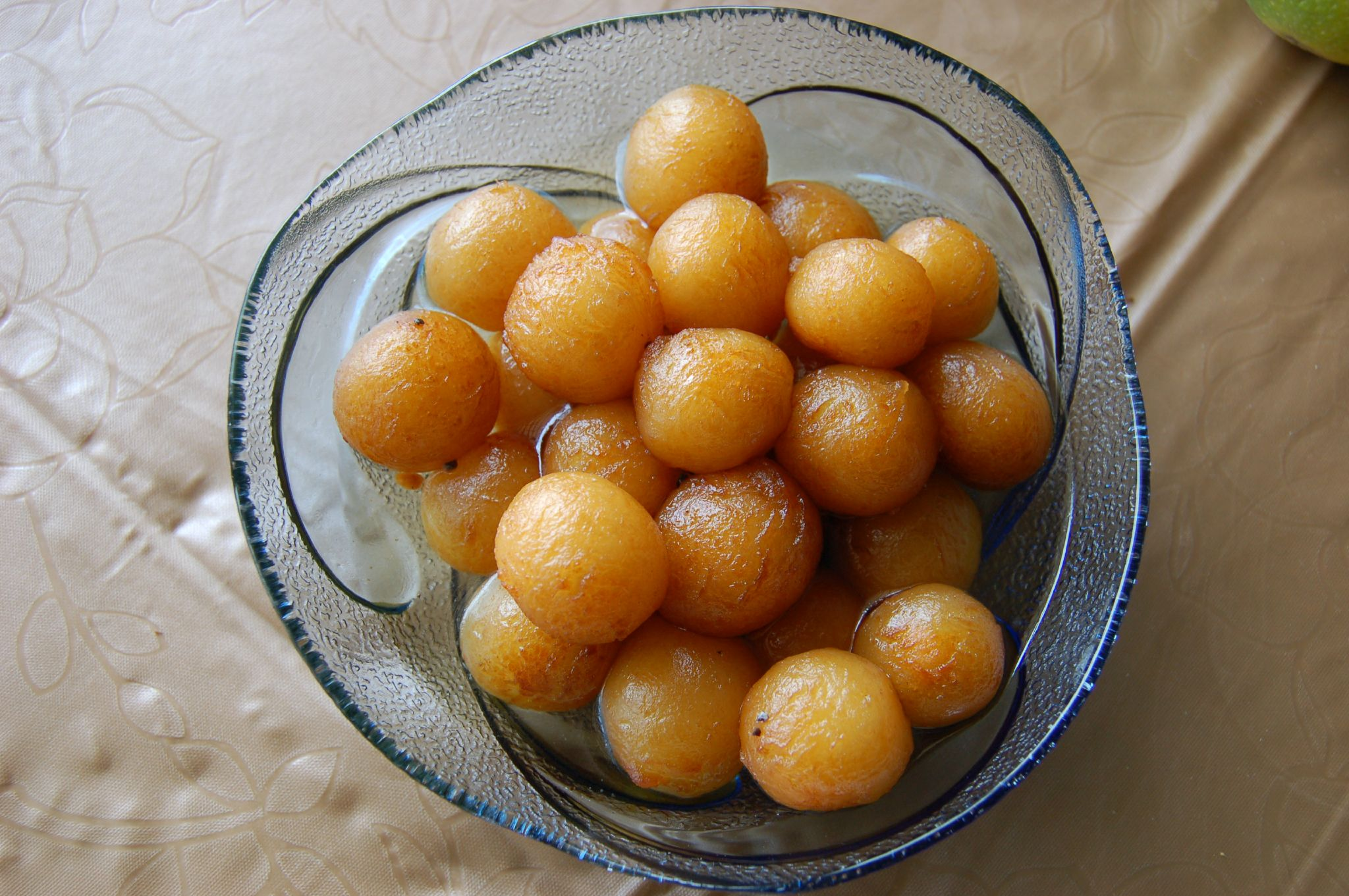
Gulab jamun

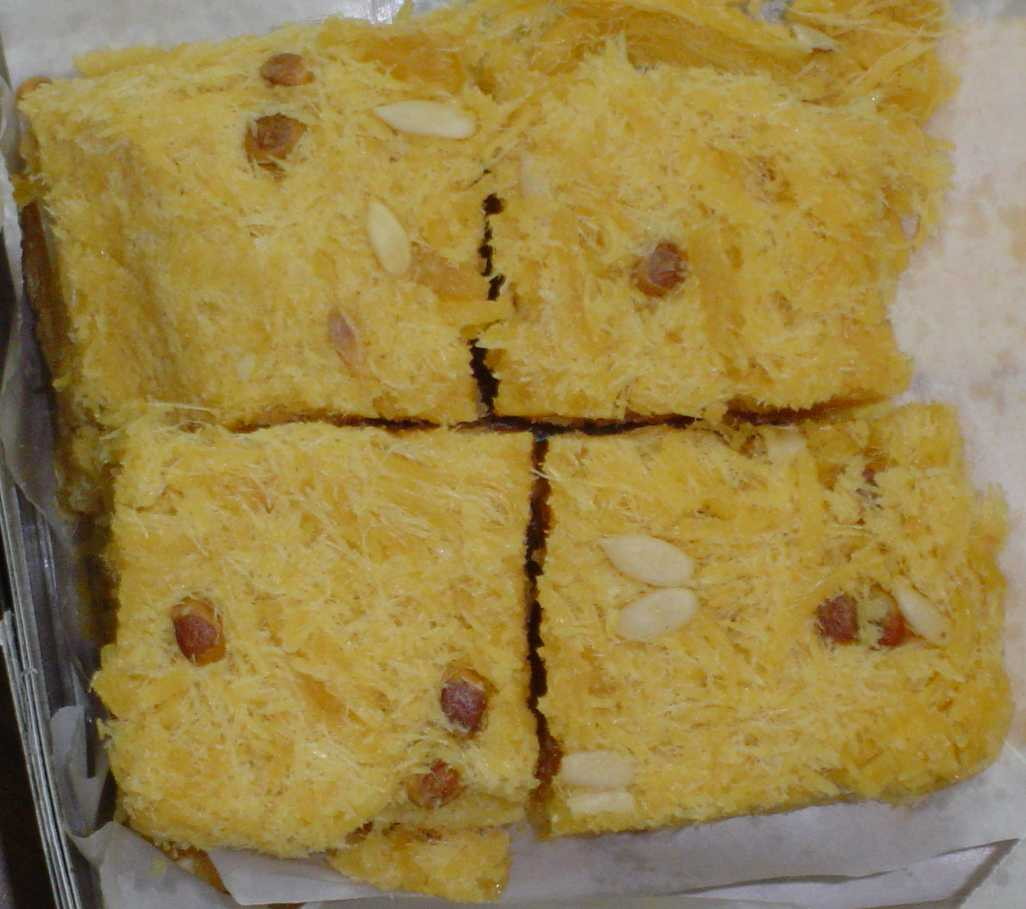
Sohnpapri

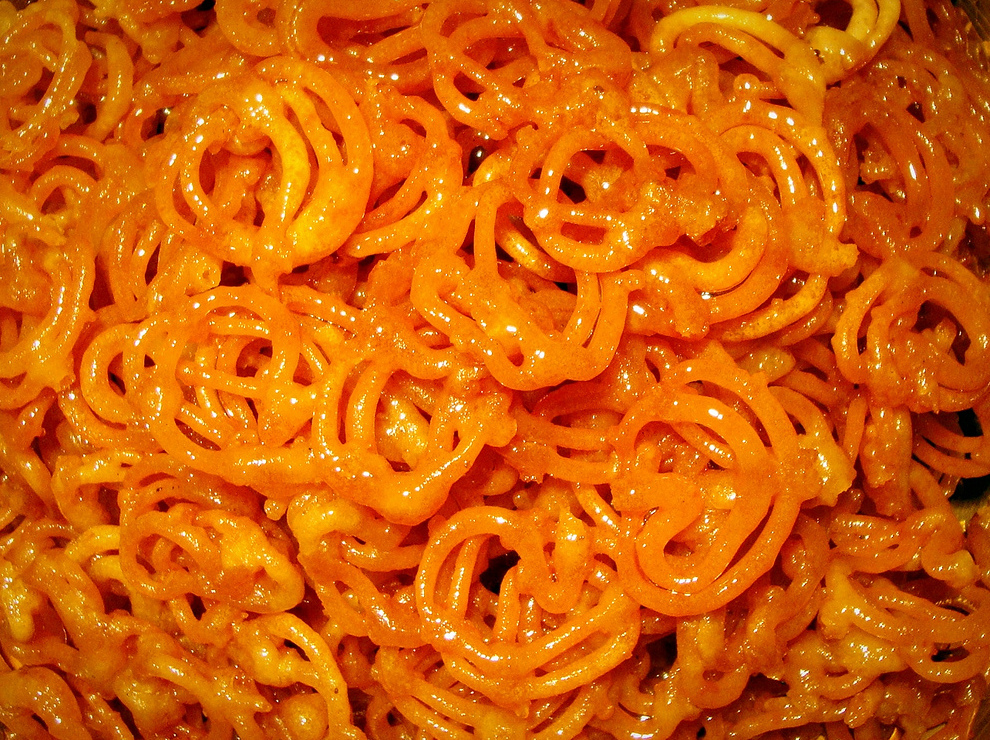
Jalebi

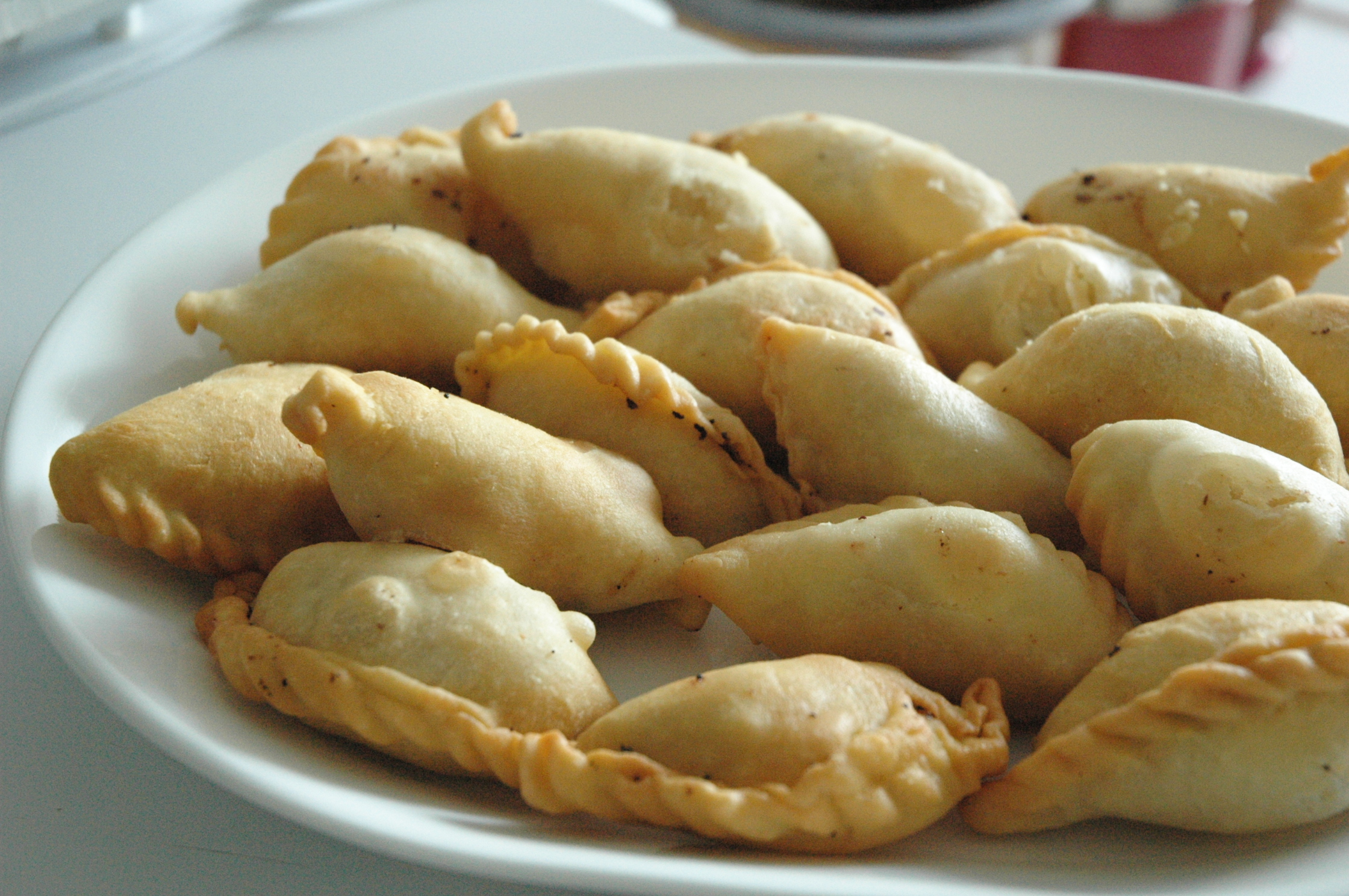
Pedukia

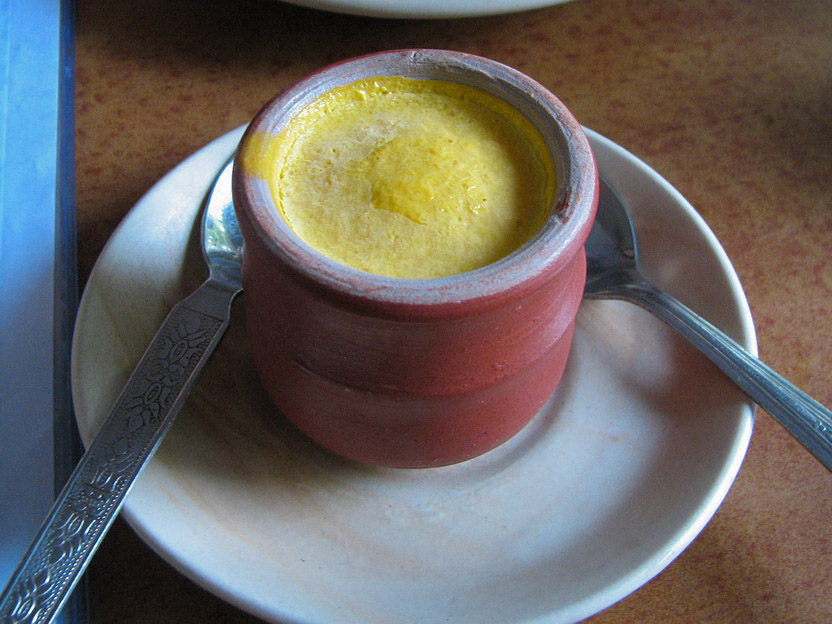
Matka kulfi is most famous among Bhojpuri peoples

== Drinks ==
- Banarasi lassi – a Varanasi variation of lassi. The curd for banarasi lassi is made with reduced milk, which gives it a creamy and thick texture. It is then sweetened, churned, and served with rabdi in earthen pots called kulhads.
- Amjhora – a mango-based drink prepared during summer. Raw mango is first charred or barbecued in embers, then peeled and pitted. The mango pulp is then flavoured using cumin powder, rock salt, mint, and jaggery, then mixed with chilled water to make a drink.
- Thandai – a sweet and cold milk-based drink prepared with a mixture of almonds, fennel seeds, watermelon kernels, rose petals, pepper, poppy seeds, cardamom, saffron, milk, and sugar. It can be prepared in many variations. It is usually prepared for Maha Shivaratri and Holi festivals.
- Kachras / ookh ke ras – a sugarcane juice flavoured with ginger, mint, lemon. It is commonly drunk in bright afternoon period during winters. Sometimes it is mixed with citrus juice (orange) to reduce sweetness.
- Sattu ke ghor (Sattu Drink)– a drink prepared with sattu (roasted chickpea flour) and served chilled. Sattu products are specially linked with Bhojpuri culinary tradition.
- Falooda – a drink prepared from vermicelli, rose syrup, and sweet basil seeds.
- Maathaa (chhachh) – a curd-based drink that can be served plain, seasoned with spices, or sweetened.
- Khas paanak
- Hajmola Chah
- Other drinks like milk (both flavoured and unflavoured), chah (tea), coffee, nemu paani (lemonade), and rose syrup are also common.
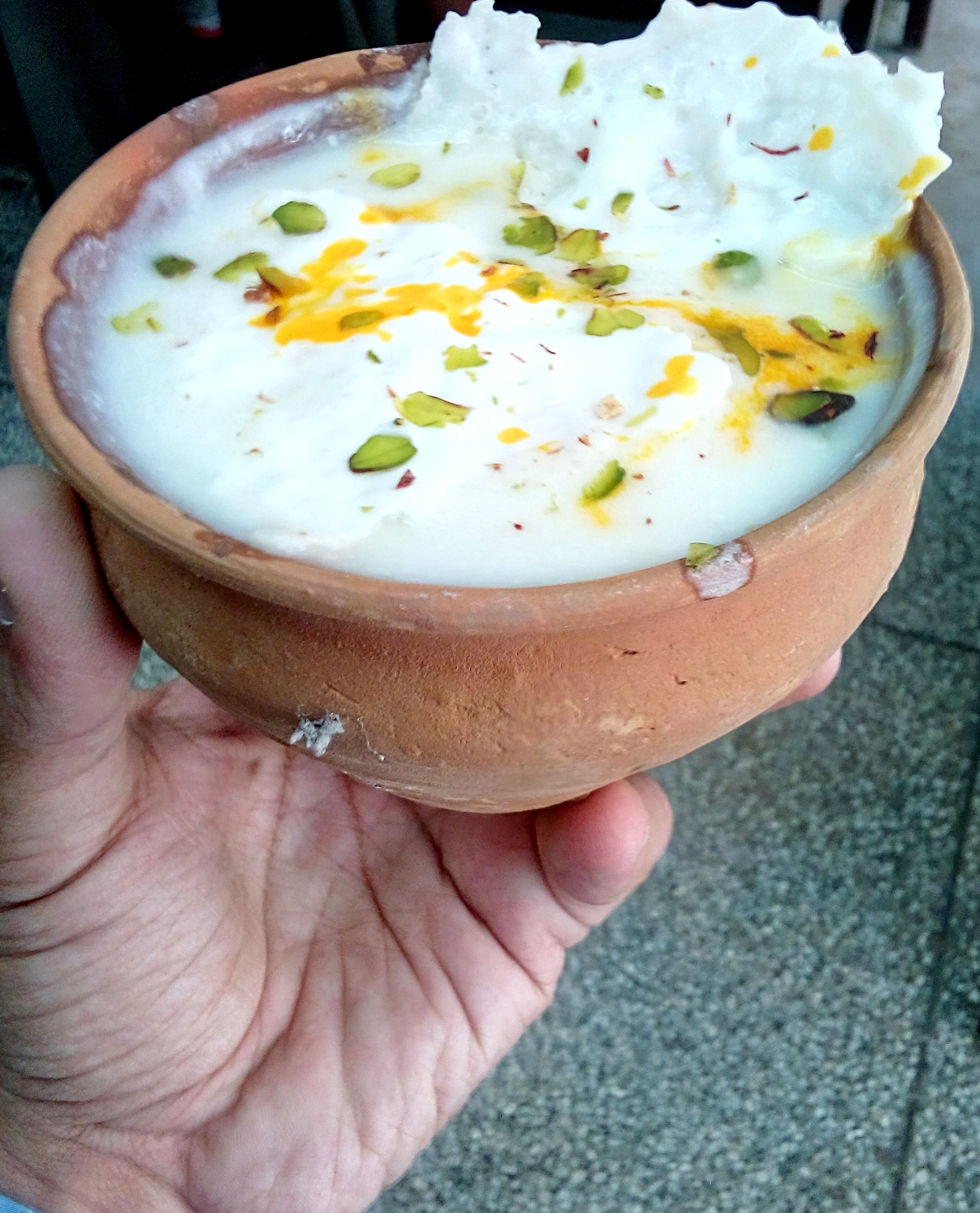
Traditional banarasi lassi in a kulhad

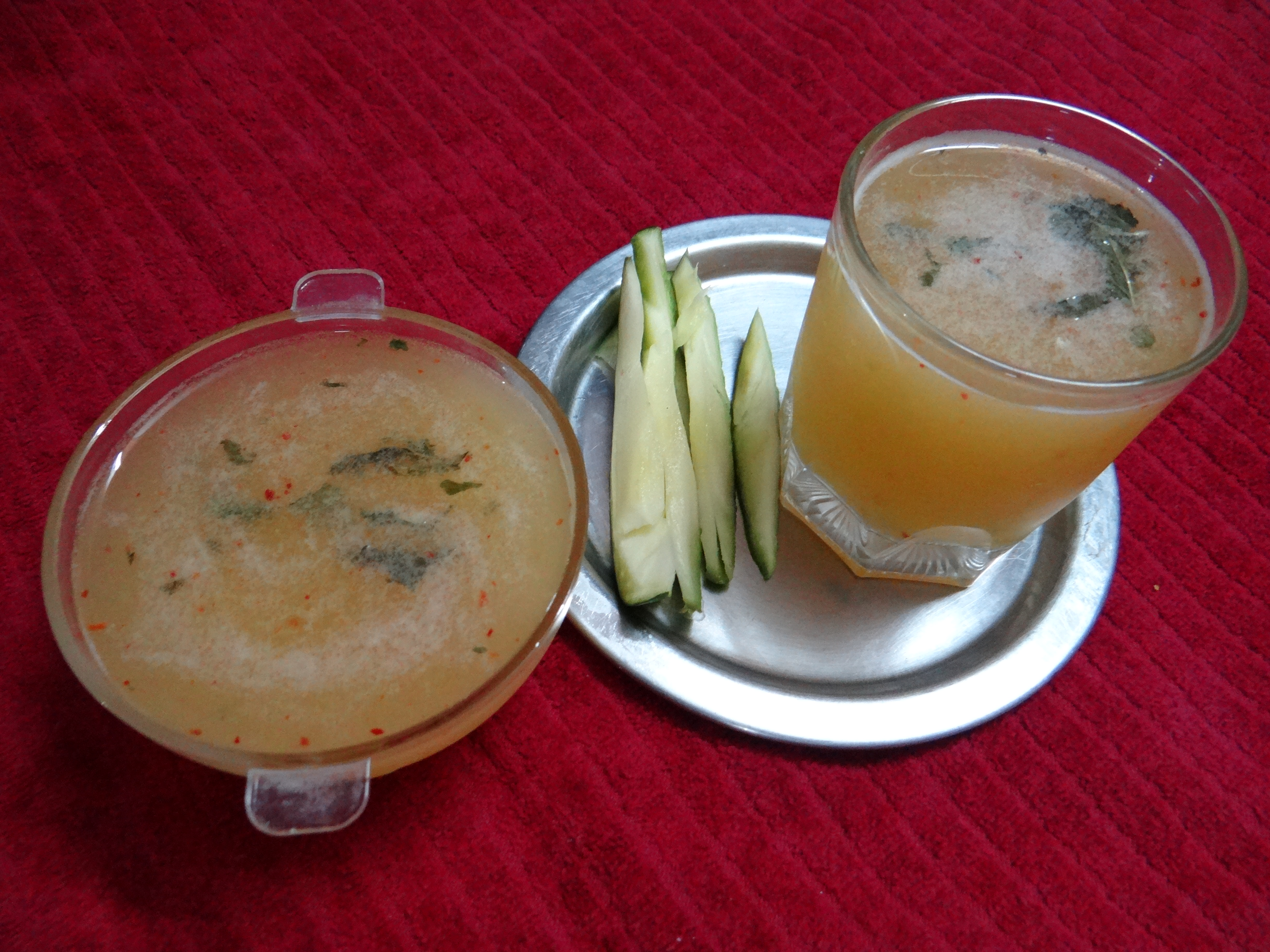
Amjhora, a raw mango drink from Bhojpuri cuisine

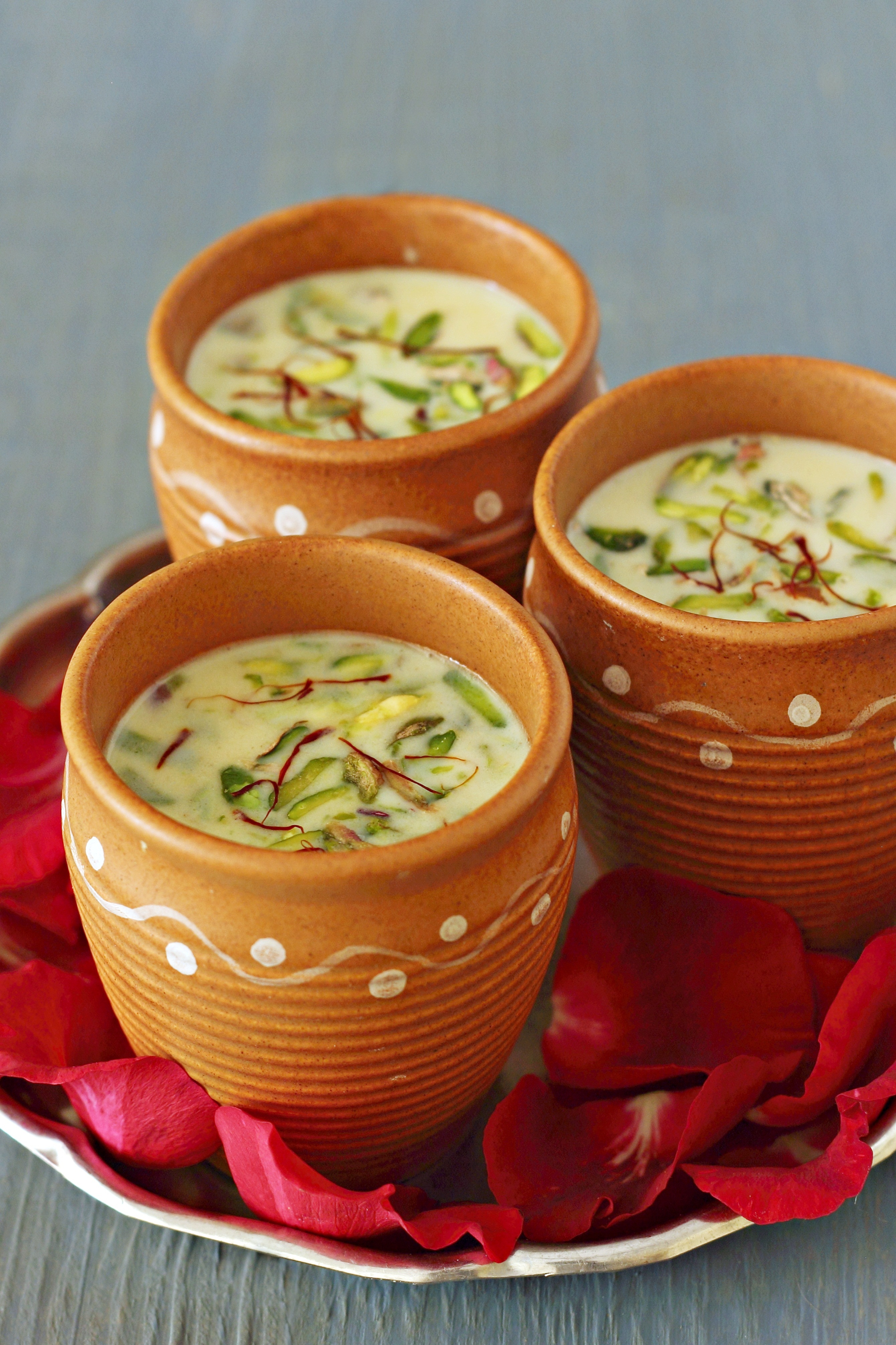
Thandai is a popular sweet drink

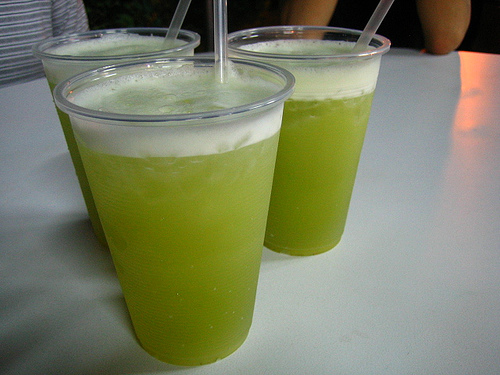
Kachras / ookh ka ras

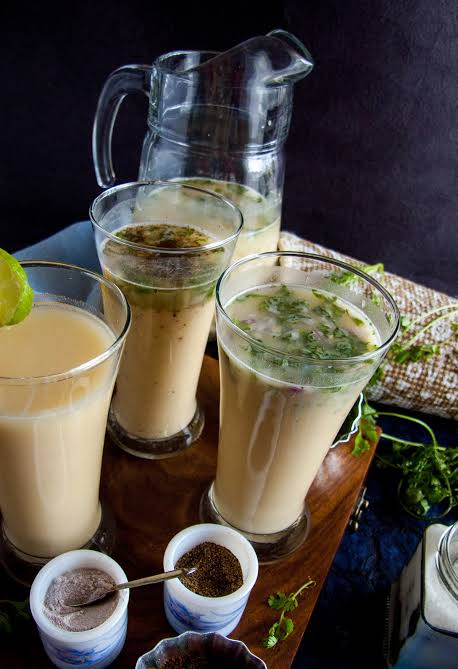
Sattu panna (or sattu ghol) is quite popular in Bhojpur region

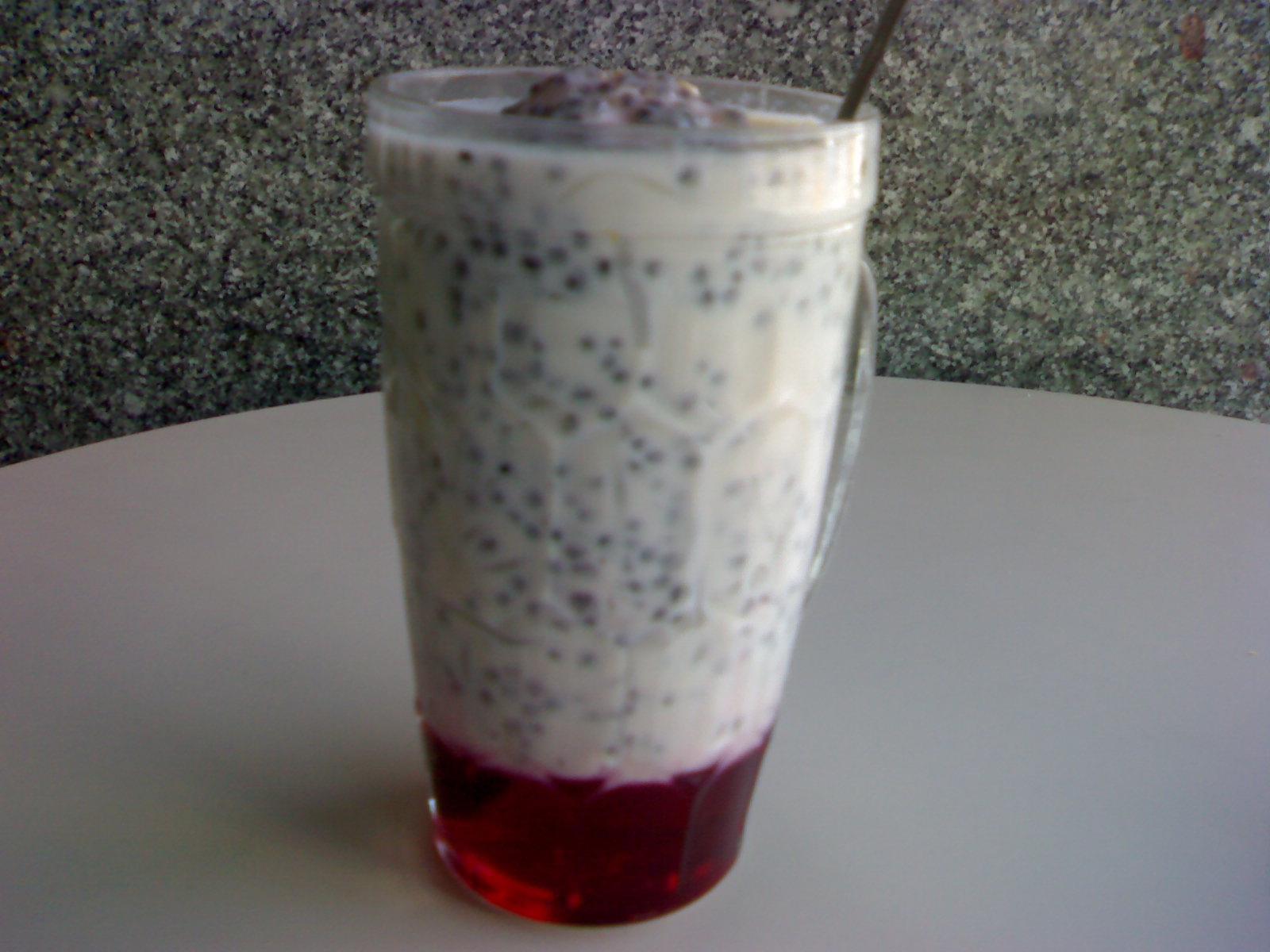
Falooda

== Snacks ==
- Bhabhara – a spicy and crispy fried fritter made using besan (gram flour), onions, green gram, and green peas. It is usually accompanied with tea or coffee.
- Pakaudi – many varieties available
- Tarua / bajka – sliced vegetables like potatoes, plantain, lauki (gourd), brinjal, parwal, and kohda (pumpkin) are coated with a batter of besan, chana dal, or rice flour to make crunchy fritters.
- Banarasi Chhena Dahi Vada—Crumbled Chhena is mixed with spices & some binding agent to prepare Chhena Vadas. These Chhena Vadas are then added to flavoured yogurt. Chhena Dahi Vada is a popular Phalaahari dish prepared in Banarasi households during Navratri festival.
- Pholourie
- Baingani
- Kachori
- Saheena
- Bara
- Chaat
- Aloo tikki
- Phuchka (also called phulki or gupchup)
- Singhada
- Tamatar Chaat
- Samosa Chaat
- Nimki
- Ghugni
- Bhoonja
- Thekua
- Tikri
- Mathri

== Dips ==
Dips like raita and chutney are important part of Bhojpuri cuisine. Dips are served as a side dish to enhance the taste of a main dish.

=== Raita ===
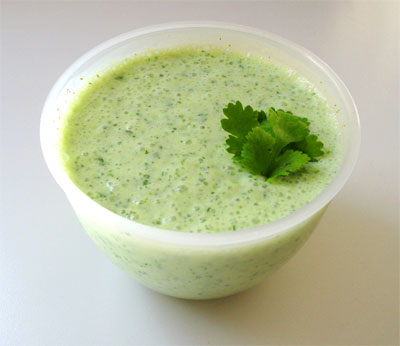
''Kakkdi raita'' with mint

Raitas are prepared by mixing thick dahi (yoghurt) with several vegetable, herbs, and seasonings.

- Lauki raita – bottle gourd raita
- Kheera-gajar raita – cucumber-carrot raita
- Pudina raita – mint raita
- Bundi raita – bundi are rain drop size fried balls of chickpea flour batter
- Sarson raita – mustard raita
- Zeera raita – roasted cumin raita

=== Chutney ===
- Dhaniya ke chutney – coriander leaves along with green chillies, garlic, salt, and a little lemon juice are ground to a thick, liquid paste.
- Tamatar ke chutney – This chutney is either sweet or salted. The salted one is prepared by mixing roasted tomatoes, chopped onion, garlic, green chilli, green coriander, and salt. The sweet chutney has same procedure as with khajur and imli chutney.
- Podina ke chutney – mint leaves along with raw mango, green chillies, sugar and salt are ground to same consistency like dhaniye ka chutney.
- Khajur ke chutney – dates are boiled or soaked overnight and mashed, then mixed with jaggery and cooked and tempered with a few spices.
- Imli ke chutney – tamarinds are boiled or soaked overnight and then skinned, deseeded, and mashed, then mixed with jaggery and cooked and tempered with a few spices.
- Dry fruit chutney – a chutney made of raisins with the additions of other nuts and dry fruits.

== See also ==
- North Indian cuisine
- Cuisine of Uttar Pradesh
- Bihari cuisine
- List of Indian Cuisine
