= Culture of Rajasthan =

Culture and traditions of Rajasthan

Rajasthan on a map of India

Rajasthan, the largest territorial state in India, is known for its rich cultural heritage, vibrant traditions, and historical significance. Rajasthani culture, which developed over the past millennia, is a blend of various elements, including music, dance, cuisine, festivals, art, and architecture.

More than 74.9% of the population of Rajasthan is vegetarian, making it the Indian state with the highest percentage of vegetarians.

== Music and dance ==
Rajasthani folk music is an integral part of the state’s cultural identity. It is characterized by its soulful melodies and traditional instruments, such as the dholak, sitar, sarangi, and harmonium. Folk songs often narrate tales of heroism, love, and devotion. The Manganiyars and Langas are two prominent communities known for their musical traditions. Their performances, which include ragas and devotional songs, are an essential part of Rajasthani culture.

=== Instruments ===
- Sarangi: A bowed string instrument, the sarangi is known for its deep, resonant sound and is often used to accompany vocal performances.
- Dholak: A two-headed drum, the dholak is a staple in Rajasthani folk music, providing rhythmic accompaniment.
- Algoza: A double-flute instrument, the algoza is played by blowing into both flutes simultaneously, creating a harmonious sound.

=== Folk dance ===
- Ghoomar: Originated from Marwar region, Ghoomar is a traditional dance performed by women. It involves graceful movements and twirling in colorful ghagras (skirts).
- Kalbeliya: Performed by the Kalbeliya community, this dance is known for its energetic and acrobatic movements. It has gained international recognition for its unique style.
- Bhavai: This dance involves balancing multiple pots on the head while performing intricate steps. It showcases the skill and balance of the performers.
- Chari: In this dance, women balance brass pots with lit lamps on their heads, creating a mesmerizing visual effect.

== Kathputli/puppetry culture ==
Kathputli is a traditional string puppet performance, which is native to Rajasthan, and is a key feature of village fairs, religious festivals and social gatherings in Rajasthan. Mentions of Kathputli have been found in Rajasthani folk tales, ballads and even folk songs. Similar rod puppets can be also found in West Bengal.

=== Origins and history ===
The art of Kathputli is believed to have been pioneered by the Bhat community, a tribal group in Rajasthan, over 1,500 years ago as a string marionette art. It is thought to have originated in the Nagaur district and its surrounding regions. Historical records suggest that the kings and nobles of Rajasthan actively encouraged this art form, fostering a tradition of patronage over the past 500 years. Wealthy families and rulers supported Kathputli artists, who in turn performed narratives that glorified the achievements and ancestry of their patrons.

The Bhat community claims that their ancestors regularly performed for royal courts, earning prestige and honour from the rulers of Rajasthan. The performances often depicted stories from Indian epics, folklore, and historical events, making Kathputli an essential medium of storytelling and entertainment in traditional Rajasthani culture.

== Cuisine ==
Rajasthani cuisine has been influenced by the warlike lifestyles of its inhabitants, the availability of ingredients in the arid region and by Hindu temple traditions of sampradayas like Pushtimarg and Ramanandi. Food that could last for several days and be eaten without heating were preferred. Scarcity of water and fresh green vegetables have all had their effect on the cooking. Signature Rajasthani dishes include Dal Baati Churma (full meal), Panchratna Dal (pulse), Papad ro Saag (papad curry)( ro refers to "of"), Ker Sangri (local curry), Gatte ro Saag (local curry). This cuisine is also known for its snacks like Bikaneri bhujia, Mirchi bada and Kanda kachauri (local dishes). Other famous dishes include Dal Baati, malai dar special lassi (lassi) and Lashun ki chutney (hot garlic paste), Mawa lassi from Jodhpur, Alwar ka mawa, Malpua from Pushkar and rasgulla from Bikaner, "paniya" and "Gheriya" from Mewar. Originated in the Marwar region of the state is the concept Marwari Bhojnalaya or vegetarian restaurants, today found in many parts of India, which offer vegetarian food of the Marwari people. Historically, Rajputs prefer largely a non-vegetarian diet while the Brahmins, Jains, Bishnois and others prefer a vegetarian diet. Consequently the state features an abundance of both of these types of delicacies.

== Arts and crafts ==
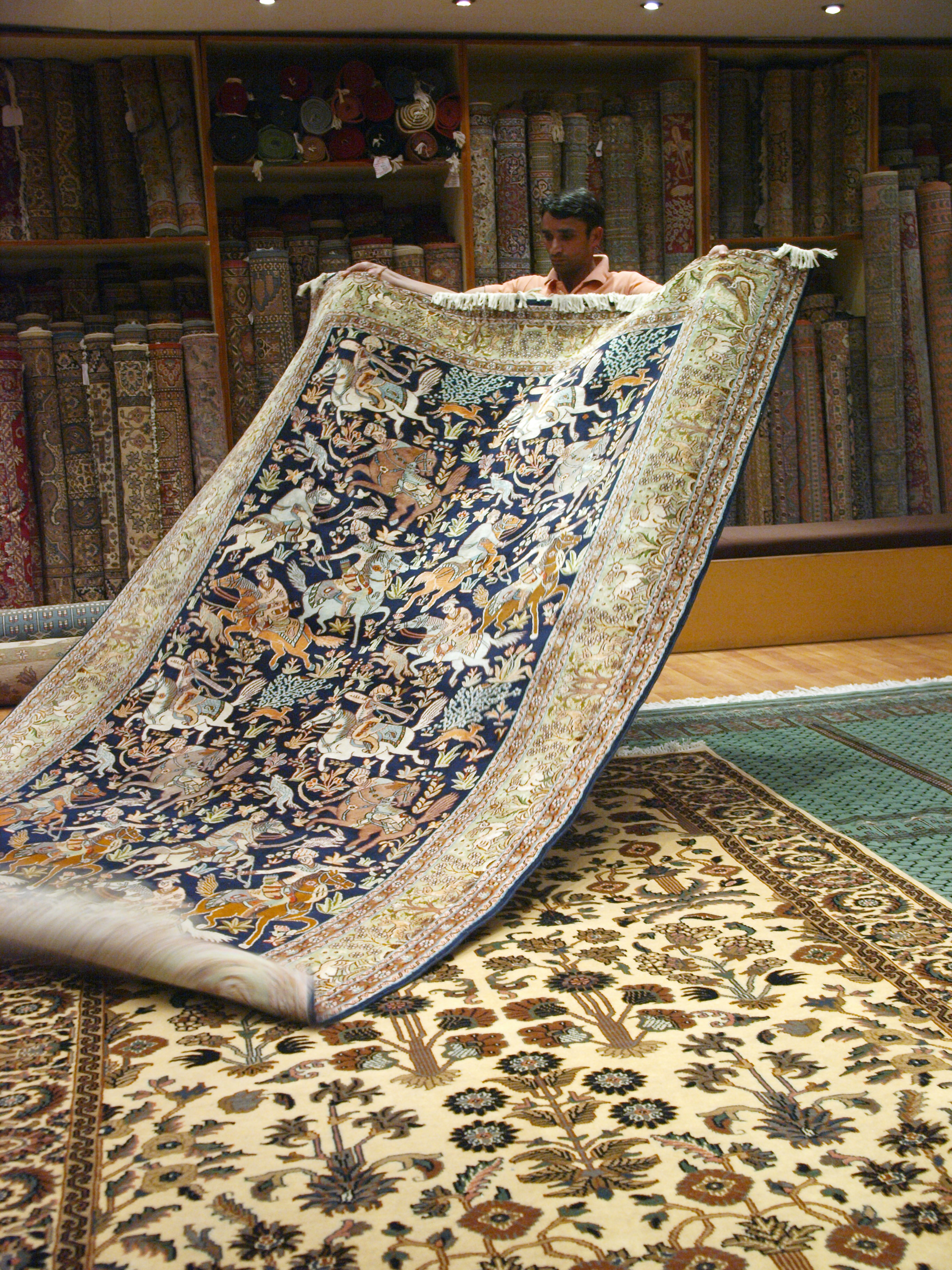
A carpet seller in Jaipur

Rajasthan is famous for textiles, semi-precious stones and handicrafts as well as for its traditional and colorful art which often features ballads. Rajasthani furniture is known for its intricate carvings and bright colors. Block prints, tie-dye prints, Bagru prints, Sanganer prints and Zari embroidery are famous. Rajasthanis are skilled in making textile products, handicrafts, gems and jeweler, dimensional stones, agro, and food products. The top five export items which contributed to the two-thirds of exports from the state of Rajasthan are textiles (including ready-made garments), gems & jewelers, engineering goods, chemical and allied products. The blue pottery of Jaipur is particularly noted for its color. To attract investment for the revival of traditional arts and crafts as well as the promotion of cultural heritage, the first handicraft policy has been released in Rajasthan. Rajasthan has a large number of raw materials namely marble, wood and leather to cash on potential for the development of handicrafts.

The Anokhi Museum of Hand Printing celebrates traditional woodblock printing on cloth.

== Architecture ==
Rajasthan is famous for its historical forts, temples, and palaces (havelis), all of which are a major attraction of tourism in the state.

=== Temple architecture ===
While there are many Gupta and post-Gupta era temples in Rajasthan, after the 7th century, the architecture evolved into a new form called the Gurjara-Pratihara style. Some famous temples of this style include the temples at Osian, the Kumbha Shyam Temple of Chittor, the temples at Baroli, the Somesvara Temple at Kiradu, the Harshnath Temple in Sikar, and the Sahasra Bahu temple of Nagda.

From the 10th to the 13th century, a new style of temple architecture was developed, known as the Solankistyle or Maru-Gurjara style. The Samadhishwar Temple at Chittor and the ruined temple at Chandravati are examples of this style.

This period was also a golden age for Jain temples in Rajasthan. Some famous temples of this period are the Dilwara Temples and the Mirpur temple of Sirohi. There are also many Jain temples of this period in the Pali district at Sewari, Nadol, Ghanerao etc.

From the 14th century and onwards, many new temples were built, including the Mahakaleshwar Temple in Udaipur, the Jagdish Temple at Udaipur, the Eklingji Temple, the Jagat Shiromani Temple of Amer, and the Ranakpur Jain temple.

=== Ancient fortifications of Rajasthan ===
- Amer Fort, Amer, Jaipur
- Bala Qila, Alwar
- Barmer Fort, Barmer
- Chittor Fort, Chittorgarh
- Gagron Fort, Jhalawar
- Gugor Fort, Baran
- Jaigarh Fort, Jaipur
- Jaisalmer Fort, Jaisalmer
- Jalore Fort, Jalore
- Jhalawar Fort, Jhalawar
- Juna Fort and Temple, Barmer
- Junagarh Fort, Bikaner
- Khandhar Fort, Sawai Madhopur
- Khejarla Fort, Khejarla, Jodhpur
- Khimsar Fort, Nagaur
- Kumbhalgarh Fort, Rajsamand
- Lohagarh Fort, Bharatpur
- Mehrangarh Fort, Jodhpur
- Nagaur Fort, Nagaur
- Nahargarh Fort, Jaipur
- Nahargarh Fort, Baran
- Neemrana Fort Palace, Neemrana, Alwar
- Ranthambore Fort, Sawai Madhopur
- Bhangarh Fort, Alwar
- Taragarh Fort, Ajmer
- Taragarh Fort, Bundi
- Shergarh Fort, Baran
- Surajgarh Fort, Surajgarh
- Bhatner Fort, Hanumangarh

=== Palaces of Rajasthan ===
- Alwar City Palace, Alwar
- Amber Palace, Amer, Jaipur
- Badal Mahal, Dungarpur
- City Palace, Jaipur
- City Palace, Udaipur
- Dholpur Palace, Dholpur
- Fateh Prakash Palace, Chittorgarh
- Gajner Palace and Lake, Bikaner
- Jag Mandir, Udaipur
- Jagmandir Palace, Kota
- Jal Mahal, Jaipur
- Juna Mahal, Dungarpur
- Lake Palace, Udaipur
- Lalgarh Palace and Museum, Bikaner
- Laxmi Niwas Palace, Bikaner
- Man Mahal, Pushkar
- Mandir Palace, Jaisalmer
- Monsoon Palace, Udaipur
- Moti Doongri, Alwar
- Moti Doongri, Jaipur
- Moti Mahal, Jodhpur
- Nathmal Ji Ki Haveli, Jaisalmer
- Patwon Ki Haveli, Jaisalmer
- Phool Mahal, Jodhpur
- Raj Mandir, Banswara
- Rampuria Haveli, Bikaner
- Rana Kumbha Palace, Chittorgarh
- Rani Padmini's Palace, Chittorgarh
- Ranisar Padamsar, Jodhpur
- Ratan Singh Palace, Chittorgarh
- Salim Singh Ki Haveli, Jaisalmer
- Sardar Samand Lake and Palace, Jodhpur
- Sheesh Mahal, Jodhpur
- Sisodia Rani Palace and Garden, Jaipur
- Sukh Mahal, Bundi
- Sunheri Kothi, Sawai Madhopur
- Udai Bilas Palace, Dungarpur
- Umaid Bhawan Palace, Jodhpur

== Religion ==
Rajasthan is a home to all the major religions of India. Hindus account for 90.63% of the population; Muslims (7.10%), Sikhs (1.27%) and Jains (1%) make up the remaining population.

=== Religious syncretism ===
Rajasthan has more popular Hindu saints, many from the Bhakti era.

Rajasthani saints hail from all castes; Maharshi Naval Ram and Umaid Lakshman Maharaj were Bhangis, Karta Ram Maharaj was a Shudra, Sundardasa was a Vaish, and Meerabai and Ramdeoji were Rajputs. The backward caste Nayaks serve as the narrators or the devotional music (or "bhajan") for the Baba Ramdevji sect.

The most popular Hindu deities are Surya, Krishna and Rama.

Modern-day popular saints from Rajasthan have been Paramyogeshwar Sri Devpuriji of Kriya Yoga and Swami Satyananda the master of Kriya Yoga, Kundalini Yoga, Mantra Yoga and Laya yoga. Rajasthan had a massive movement to unite the Hindus and Muslims to worship God together. Saint Baba Ramdevji was adored by Muslims, equally as he was by Hindus.

Mostly Rajasthani people speak the Marwari language.

Saint Dadu Dayal was a popular figure who came from Gujarat to Rajasthan to preach the unity of Ram and Allah. Sant Rajjab was a saint born in Rajasthan who became a disciple of Dadu Dayal and spread the philosophy of unity amongst Hindu and Muslim worshipers of God.

Saint Kabir was another popular figure noted for bringing the Hindu and Muslim communities together and stressing that God may have many forms (e.g. in the form of Rama or Allah.)

== Fairs and festivals ==
The main religious festivals are Deepawali, Holi, Gangaur, Rakshabandan, Teej, Goga Navami, Makar Sankranti, Ganesh Chaturthi and Janmashtami as the main religion is Hinduism.

Rajasthan's desert festival in Jaisalmer is celebrated once a year during winter. People of the desert dance and sing ballads of valor, romance and tragedy. There are fairs with snake charmers, puppeteers, acrobats and folk performers. Camels play a prominent role in this festival.

== See also ==
- Rajasthani language
- Rajasthani people
- Marwar
- Rajput
