= North Indian culture =

Culture of North India

The culture of North India encompasses North Indian classical music or Hindustani music, the Indian classical dance of kathak and other folk dances, traditional North Indian clothing, North Indian architecture and North Indian cuisine among other aspects.

== Clothing ==
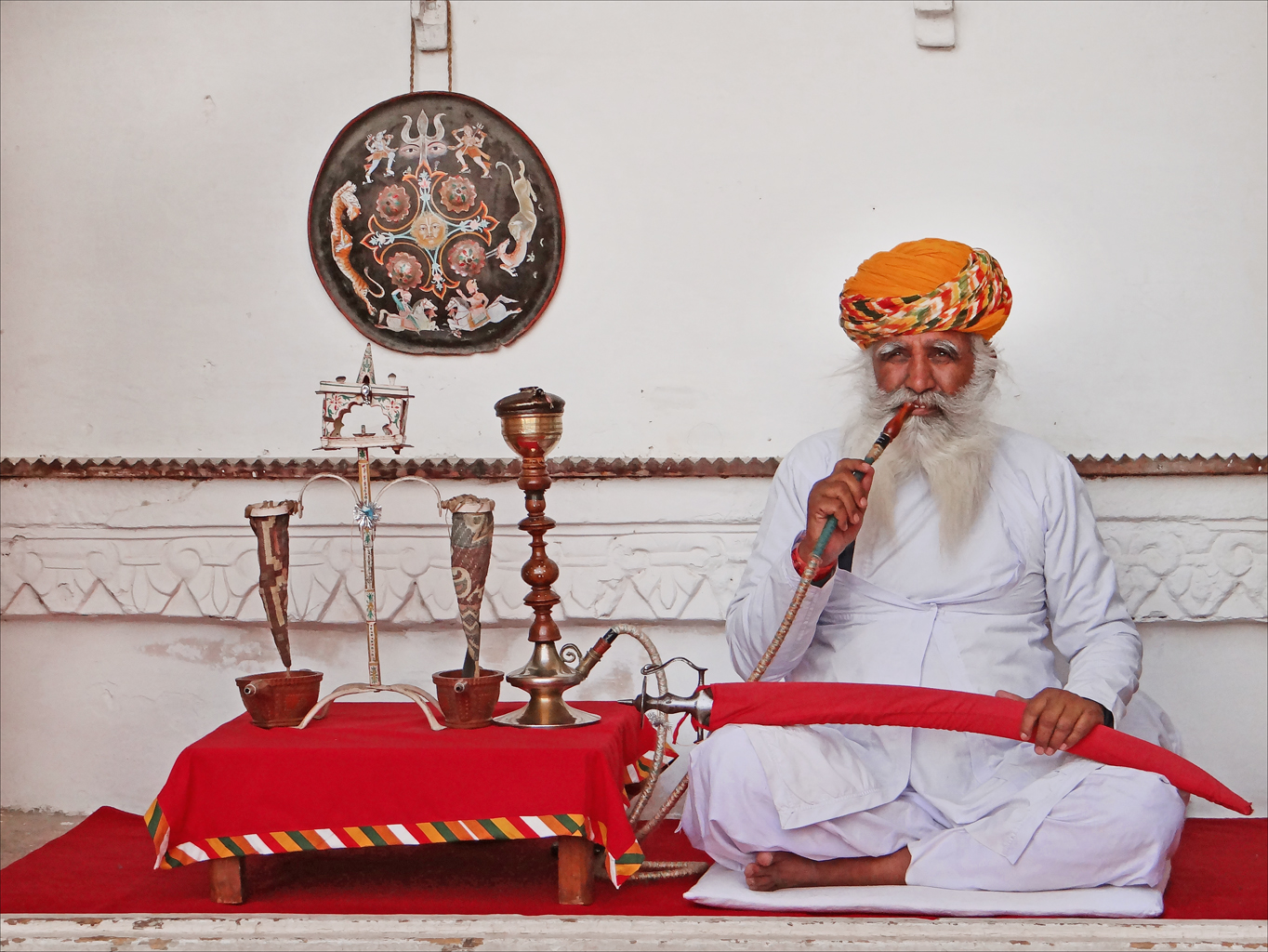
Man in traditional dress smoking hookah, Rajasthan, India.

Women traditionally wear shalwar kameez, ghagra choli, sari and pheran. Dupatta is worn to complete the outfit. Men traditionally wear kurta, achkan, kameez and sherwani for upper garment, lower garment includes dhoti, churidar, and shalwar. Pagri is usually worn around the head to complete the outfit, especially in rural areas. In states like Uttarakhand and Himachal Pradesh, women usually wear ghaghra and a full sleeved blouse or kurta salwar adorning a coat and an orni (headscarf). The men usually wear kurta and pants or shirt) coat with a Himachali cap. In the states of Punjab, Jammu and Kashmir, Himachal Pradesh and Haryana, the traditional dress is shalwar kameez. In the states of Rajasthan, Uttar Pradesh, and southern Haryana, it is ghagra choli. Pagri is worn in various region styles and is the symbol which shows one's status and the respect in which one is held. In urban centres and as well as rural areas western influence can easily be seen nowadays.

== Cuisine ==
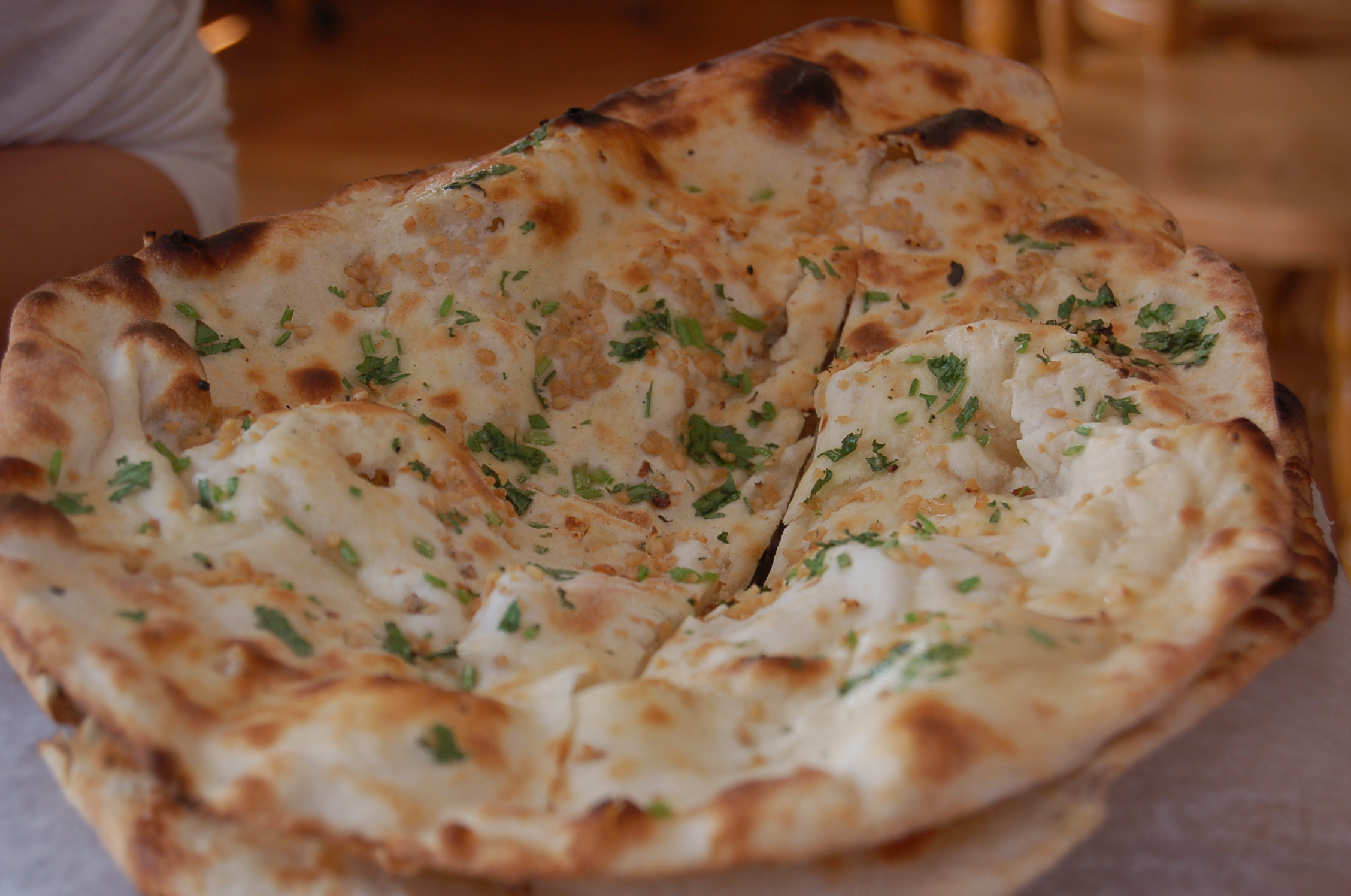
Naan is popular form of flatbread eaten in Northern India.

Wheat, along with rice and millets forms the staple diet of North India. Wheat is usually served in the form of roti or chapatis along with saag, bhaaji, tarkari or saalan (vegetarian curry dishes). Other wheat breads include: deep fried puris and shallow fried parathas. During winters, flatbreads made of millets like bajra and maize are common. Rice dishes called bhaat are generally paired with lentil and bean dishes. Various varieties of rice dishes like jeera bhaat, khaare chawal, matar chawal, meethe chawal, kesariya bhaat form part of North Indian cuisine.

Dal Roti (lentil and flatbread) and dal chawal (lentil and rice) are common vegetarian combos in North Indian cuisine. Vegetarian diet is prevalent except in Jammu and Kashmir and the hilly regions, however, the non-vegetarian food is also popular. Mughlai cuisine, especially that of Lucknow and Delhi, is known for non-vegetarian dishes with a distinctive aroma, taste and with a different style of cooking. Vaishno dhabas serving satvik cuisine can be found all over North Indian region.

Milk and its by-products along with leguminous food products like lentils and beans are abundantly used in North Indian cuisine. Some of the popular lentil dishes (dals) from North India include chana dal, moong dal, arhar dal, masur dal, mothh dal and urad dal (which in restaurant is served with butter and is branded by name dal makhani). Other bean dishes include rajma, lobia, kala chana and Kabuli chana. Rajma chawal is particularly popular throughout India. Kala Chana (along with halwa and puri) is cooked during the Ashtami day of Navratri festival. Besan (Indian gram flour) is particularly used to prepare number of North Indian dishes like kadhi, pakodas, missi roti etc.

Rajasthani cuisine is famous for its dishes like dal bati, churma, etc.

A variety of desserts can be found in North India, like jalebi (a crispy sugary circular dessert) which also comes in another variant called imarti, halwa , ghevar and gujia, kheer (Indian rice pudding), petha, mathura peda, bal mithai (from Kumaon), to name but a few.

== Regional diversity ==
North India is a diverse regional area which includes many different traditions across Himachal Pradesh to Uttar Pradesh. Mainly the people from north in Himalayan belt are more closely related to Tibetans and Burmans. There are almost hundreds of major and minor languages in Northern part of India like Hindi, Punjabi, Haryanvi which are labelled with each religion such as Hinduism, Jainism, Buddhism, and Sikhism.Other than this, there is a lot of economic disparity among states in terms of GDP (total economic output) and GDP per capita (economic output per individual) which focuses on the different development rates in states of North India. As of now, Delhi leads whereas other states of North like Uttar Pradesh have the lowest GDP per capita.

=== Delhi ===
Delhi is considered a mix of traditional and cosmopolitan styles. It reflects a diversity of multiple fairs and festivals which include film festivals as well as religious groups. Delhi serves urban commercial and leisure centers as they have art galleries, cinema multiplexes, bowling alleys and restaurants which have variety of Indian and international cuisine.

=== Haryana ===
Haryana was separated from Punjab in 1966. It is considered one of the largest automobile hubs where it accounts for two-thirds of passenger cars, 50% of tractors and 60% of motorcycles in India. It has become famous for the textile recycle and second-largest producer of recycled fibre. Dairy products like ghee and buttermilk are widely used in Haryanvi Cuisine. The food characterized by spices and simple preparation so people can taste the flavor of the ingredients. Some of the popular Haryanvi desserts include Mithe Chawal and Alsi ki Pinni.

=== Rajasthan ===
Rajasthan has a wide range of temperature from arid to humid. Most of the population of Rajasthan is historically associated with the Rajput who are considered the landowning rulers. It is a considered a state for sandy deserts, folks arts and culture and for its royal historic places. They have Marwari cuisine which is present in all water-scarce areas around. The traditional dishes of Rajasthan are the Alwar ka mawa, Malpauas from Pushkar and Rasgulla from Bikaner, Daal Baati Churma, Gatte Ki Sabzi, Kale Channa Ki Kadhi, Safed Maas, and Laal Maas.

=== Uttar Pradesh ===
Uttar Pradesh is in the plains formed by the Ganges and Yamuna rivers. Many of the architecture, painting and music are of the Mughal period. One of the most notable architectures of Mughal Period is Taj Mahal at Agra which was built by the emperor Shah Jahan. This state has a wide variety of food from simple meals from villagers and royal traditional food for Mughal kings. Some of the traditional foods are Baati Chokha, Kebab, Awadhi Biryani, Nihari, Shami Kabab, Ghewar, Peda, and Soan Papdi.

== Games ==
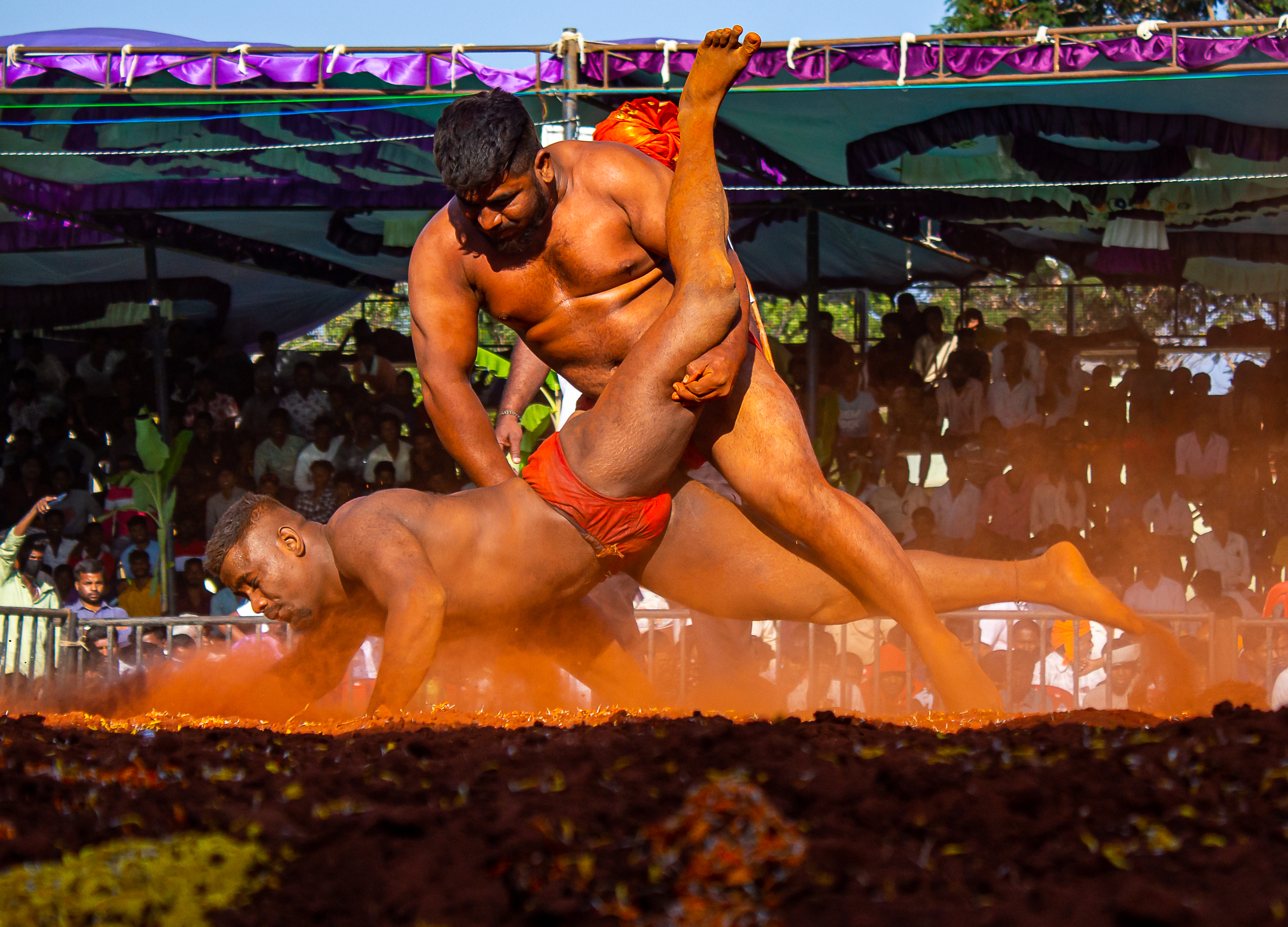
People playing Pehlwani, which is a traditional sport in North India.

North India has diverse traditional sports and games. These games account for teamwork, discipline, and endurance. The games naturally evolved and passed down through oral tradition and practice with connections to festivals, rituals and seasons. Some of the popular games of North India are listed below:

Kho-Kho: It is a tag game played by teams which require speed, agility and thinking. It is a widely-played game in school.

Kabaddi- A sport which combines wrestling and tag. It demands strength, stamina and quick reflexes.

Pehlwani- It is a traditional form of wrestling which is influenced by Mughal culture. It has become part of many rural cultures and celebrations.

Gilli Danda- Ancient sport which involves two sticks, so a large stick is used to strike the smaller one. It needs precision and hand-eye coordination.

Kancha (Marbles)- It has a flicking glass marble to strike others, aiming to collect the most. It is usually played by children in playgrounds.

== Festivals in North India ==
Fairs and Festivals are an important part of the North India’s culture. Some of the famous ones are:

Holi: It is considered a major festival which is with great devotion in Mathura, Uttar Pradesh. In this festival, people are drenched with colors and consume traditional sweets.

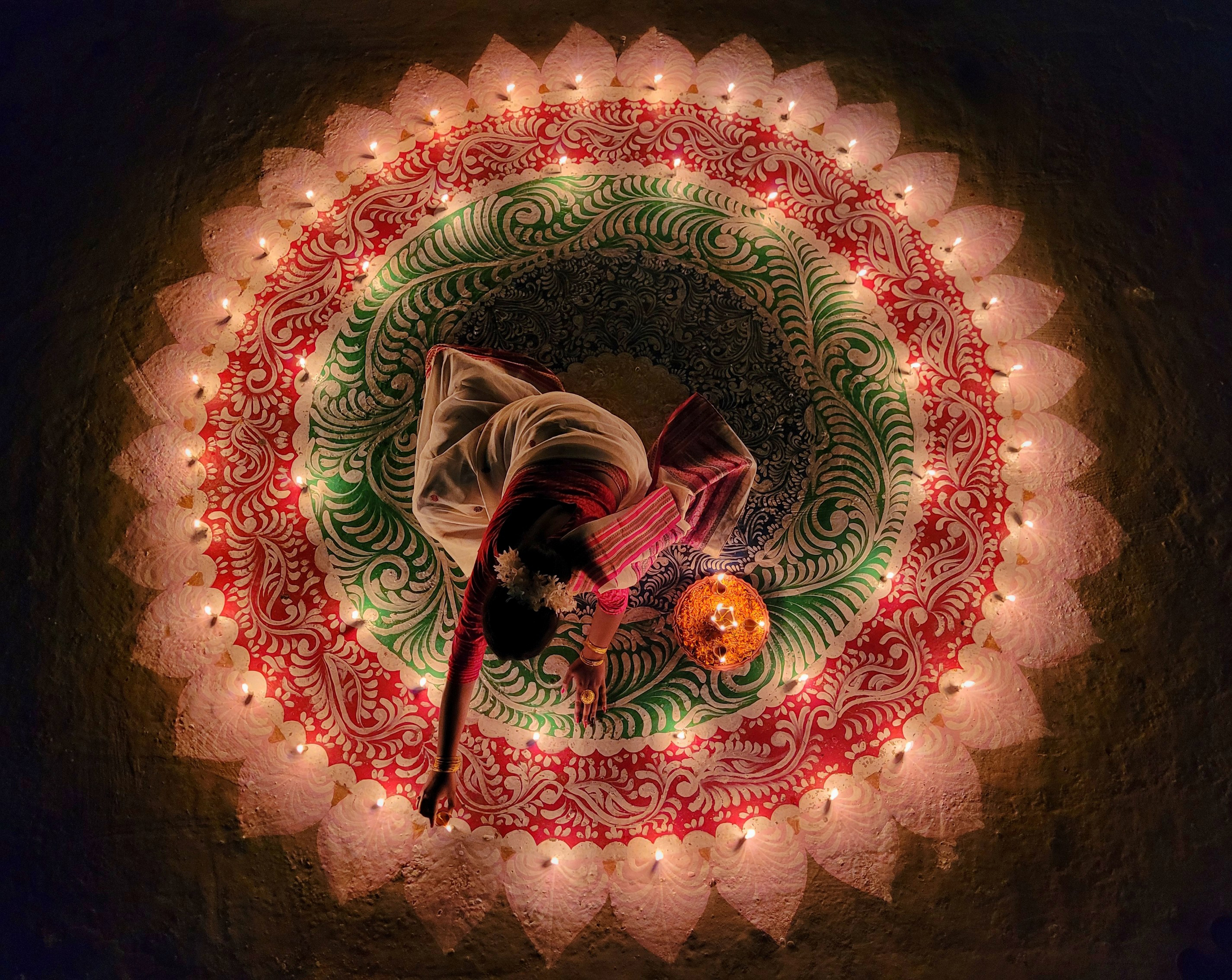
Women lighting the candles for Indian festival, Diwali.

Diwali: It is celebrated for victory of good over evil. People worship Goddess Laxmi and decorate their houses with Diya. To celebrate the victory, crackers are burnt and gifts are exchanged.

Janmashtami: It celebrates the birth of Lord Krishna. Devotees observe fasting and chant the devotional songs in the praise of the Lord.

Navratri- It is celebrated in Northern part of India where they honor Goddess Durga and her victory over Mahishasura. People are keeping fasts for several days to purify the body and mind. Devotees follow routines during the nine days.

Baisakhi- This festival highlights courage, discipline and equality as people celebrate the harvest of agriculture. Sikhs usually work in gurdwaras to offer prayers.

== Music and dance ==
Hindustani classical music or Shastriya Sangeet is the classical music of North India. Around the 12th-century, Hindustani classical music diverged from what eventually came to be identified as Carnatic music of South India. The central notion in both these systems is that of a melodic mode or raga, sung to a rhythmic cycle or tala. Indian classical music has seven basic notes, Sa Re Ga Ma Pa Dha Ni, with five interspersed half-notes, resulting in a 12-note scale. The rhythmic organization is based on rhythmic patterns called tala. The melodic foundations are called ragas. Noted representatives of Shastriya Sangeet with a worldwide acclaim are Pandit Ravi Shankar and Ustad Ali Akbar Khan.

Many different folk dance styles of North India include bhangra and giddha from Punjab, kathak in Uttar Pradesh, ghoomar and kalbelia from Rajasthan, nati from Himachal Pradesh, jagars and Pandva Nritya from Uttarakhand. Kud dance of Jammu and Kashmir is the way to thank local deities in the night of rainy season with the beats of drum like instrument narsingha. Kathak is one of the eight Indian classical dance forms as conferred by Sangeet Natak Akademi. This dance form traces its origins to the nomadic bards of ancient northern India, known as kathaks, or storytellers. Some believe it evolved from god Krishna's raas lilas, forms of which have also evolved into the popular garba-style dances popular in other parts of the region and Gujarat in western India. Raas lilas portrays the love stories of lord Krishna. A dance form which depicts the eternal love. It was quintessential theatre, using instrumental and vocal music along with stylized gestures, to enliven the stories.

== Architecture and art ==
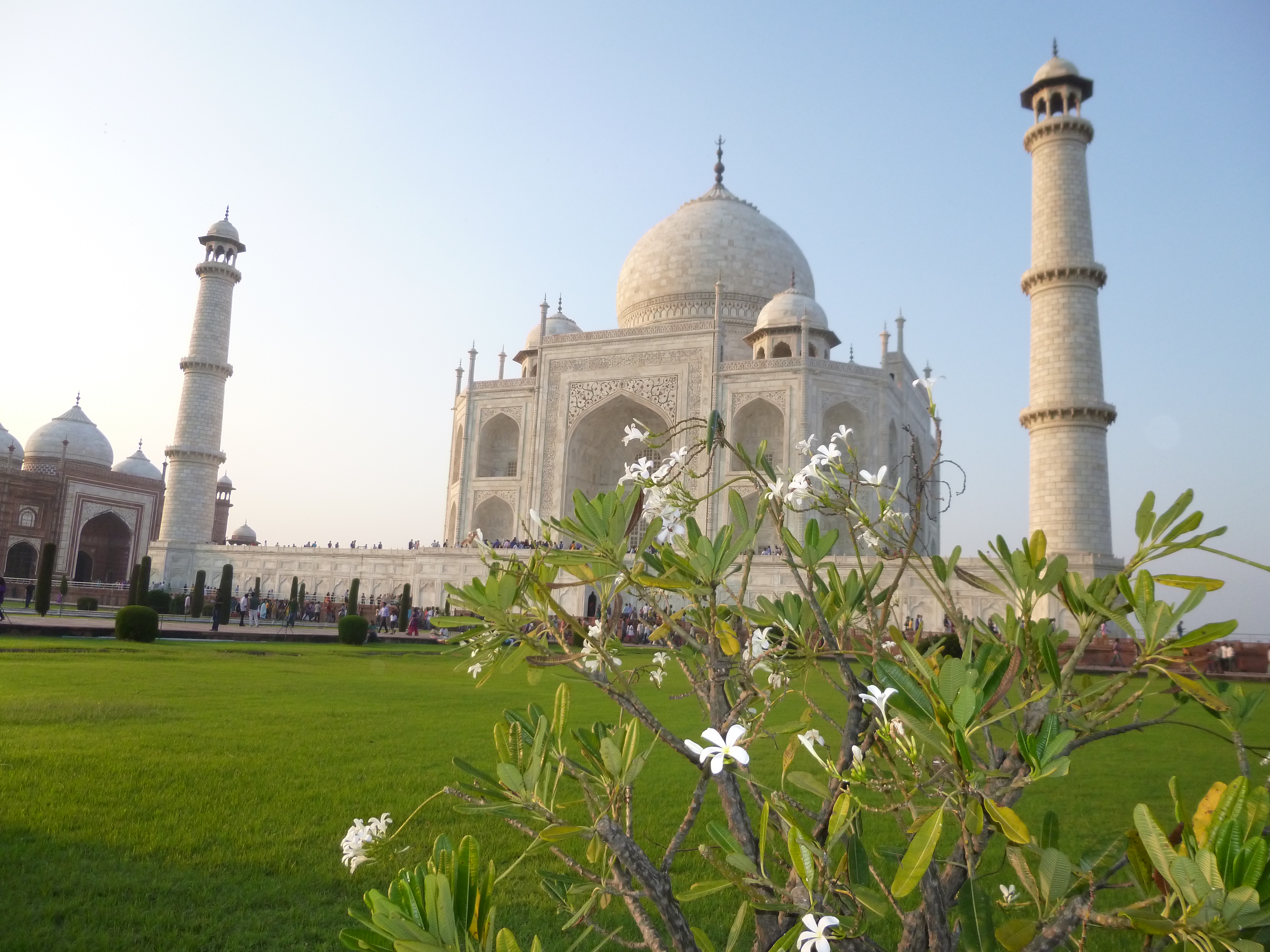
Taj Mahal is one of UNESCO world heritage sites in the region and regarded as one of the seven wonders of the world.

Out of twenty-three cultural world heritage sites in India which have been declared by UNESCO, ten are in North India. The Taj Mahal, the quintessential Indo-Islamic architecture, is one of the seven wonders of the world. The Mahabodhi Temple complex at Bodh Gaya, Bihar built by Mauryan emperor Ashoka in 260 BC, marks the enlightenment of Buddha. Khajuraho temple and Buddhist monuments of Sanchi in Madhya Pradesh finds itself in the list of world heritage sites. Other renowned architectural and holy sites are the Golden Temple in Amritsar (Punjab), Urban and Architectural Work of Le Corbusier in Chandigarh, Dilwara Temples of Mount Abu(Rajasthan) to name a few. A different genre of paintings evolved in North India especially the miniature paintings. Rajput painting a style of Indian painting that evolved and flourished during the 18th-century, in the royal courts of Rajputana. Rajput paintings depict a number of themes, events of epics like the Ramayana and the Mahabharata, Krishna's life, beautiful landscapes, and humans.

One of the best-known examples of North Indian sculpture is the Lion Capital of Ashoka, Sarnath. It is the source for the national emblem of India and hints at the richness and grandeur of the ancient Mauryan Empire. The Rampurva bull capital is one of the best specimens of animal sculpture.

Two different schools of art namely the Gandhara and Mathura schools of art evolved in ancient times which represented the developments in sculptures, stucco, and clay as well as in mural paintings. The Kushana emperors, particularly Kanishka, encouraged the Gandhara artists to sculpture themes from Buddha's life and the Jatakas. The distinctive school of art which grew here is called the Gandhara school of art. A large number of the images of the Buddha and the Bodhisattvas were produced. Mathura art, however, reached its peak during the Gupta period. The human figure reached its most sublime representation in the Gupta classical phase when divine images, conceived and rendered in human shape, attained a superhuman aspect and manifested great spiritual import. The sculptures were marked by sharp and beautiful features, graceful and slim bodies, with many folds of transparent drapery and a new style of coiffure.

== Literature ==
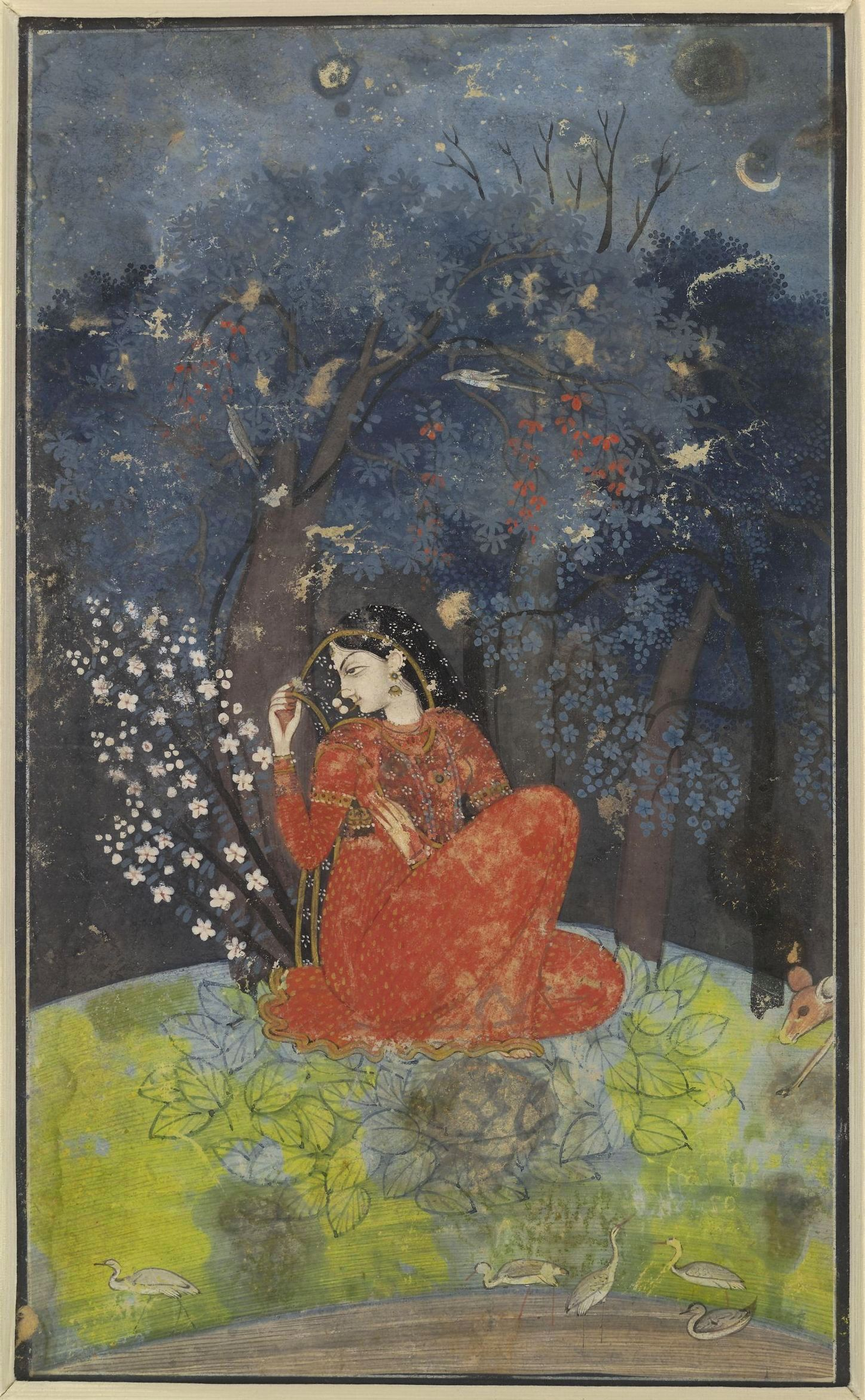
Utka Nayika awaits her lover in the forest. Kangra painting, c. 1775-1780 CE.

North India was the birthplace of Kalidasa, who wrote classic Sanskrit plays like Mālavikāgnimitram, Abhijñānaśākuntalam and Vikramōrvaśīyam and poems like Raghuvaṃśa, Kumārasambhava, Ṛtusaṃhāra and Meghadūta in which the use of imagination and similes remains unequaled by any other literary work. Apart from these Sanskrit dramas, Pāṇini's Ashtadhyayi standardized Sanskrit grammar and phonetics and left an indelible mark on these aspects of Sanskrit.

Medieval North India had great literary scholars like Tulsidas, Surdas, Chand Bardai, Amir Khusrauwhose works Ramcharitmanas, Sur Sagar, Prithiviraj Raso and Khamsa of Amir Khusrau respectively contributed to the richness of literature. By the 19th-century onwards Hindi and Urdu (registers of the Hindustani language) had become the lingua franca of northern India.

Hindi was popularized by the writings of Dayananda Saraswati, Bharatendu Harishchandra and others. Other important writers of this period are Munshi Premchand, Mahavir Prasad Dwivedi, Maithilisharan Gupt. Premchand's Hindi-Urdu works, such as Godaan and Gaban have been translated into various languages, and are known for their subtlety and depiction of human psychology and emotions.

== See also ==
- Culture of India
- Culture of Jammu and Kashmir
- Culture of Himachal Pradesh
- Culture of Punjab, India
- Culture of Chandigarh
- Culture of Haryana
- Culture of Uttarakhand
- Culture of Delhi
- Culture of Rajasthan
- Culture of Uttar Pradesh
- Culture of Madhya Pradesh
- Culture of Chhattisgarh

== References and bibliography ==
- Flavours of India. North Zone Cultural Centre, Ministry of Culture, Government of India.
- Puran Chand Sharma. Sanskriti ke Stambh. North Zone Cultural Centre, Ministry of Culture, Government of India.
- Kālidāsa; Johnson, W. J. (editor). The Recognition of Śakuntalā: A Play in Seven Acts. 2001. Oxford and New York: Oxford University Press. ISBN 978-0-19-283911-4
- MacDonell, Arthur Anthony. A History of Sanskrit Literature. 2004. Kessinger Publishing. ISBN 1-4179-0619-7
- Massey, Reginald. India's Dances. 2006. Abhinav Publications.ISBN 81-7017-434-1
- Thapar, Romila. A History of India. Vol. 1. .1990. New Delhi and London: Penguin Books. ISBN 0-14-013835-8
