= Rajasthani cuisine =

Cuisine of the Rajasthan region in northwest India

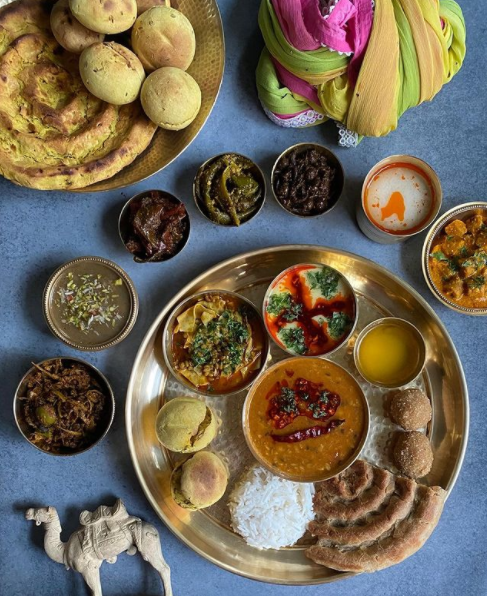
Rajasthani thaali consisting of typical Rajasthani dishes, including panchratna dal, baati, khooba roti, and ker sangri

Rajasthani cuisine is the traditional cuisine of the Rajasthan state in north-west India. It was influenced by various factors like the warlike lifestyles of its inhabitants, the availability of ingredients in an arid region, and by Hindu temple traditions of sampradayas like Pushtimarg and Ramanandi. Food that could last for several days and could be eaten without heating was preferred.

Scarcity of water and fresh green vegetables have all had their effect on the cooking. Signature Rajasthani dishes include dal baati churma, panchratna dal, papad ro saag, ker sangri, and gatte ro saag. It is also known for its snacks like bikaneri bhujia, mirchi bada and kanda kachauri. Other famous dishes include malaidar special lassi (lassi) and Lashun ki chutney (hot garlic paste), Mawa lassi from Jodhpur, Alwar ka mawa, Malpauas from Pushkar and rasgulla from Bikaner, "paniya"and "gheriya" from Mewar.

Originating for the Marwar region of the state is the concept Marwari Bhojnalaya, or vegetarian restaurants, today found in many parts of India, which offer vegetarian food of the Marwari people. The history also has its effect on the diet as the Rajputs preferred majorly a non-vegetarian diet while the Brahmins, Jains, Bishnois and others preferred a vegetarian diet. So, the state has a myriad of both types of delicacies.

According to a 2014 survey released by the Registrar General of India, Rajasthan has 74.9% vegetarians, which makes it the most vegetarian state in India.

== Rajwaadi culinary tradition ==
Rajasthan is known for its Royal Rajwaadi cuisine (also known as Raajsi cuisine) which emanated from the culinary traditions of Royal courts and temples.

The Rajwaadi cuisine is characterized by high usage of dry fruits & milk products like Yogurt for preparing rich gravies, ghee & butter for cooking & frying, mawa & chhena for sweets, usage of Kesar, kewda water & rose water and whole spices like jayaphal, javitri, cardamom etc. for flavoring and aroma.

Often Rajwaadi food items are decorated with thin foils of gold & silver and also served in golden or silver crockery.

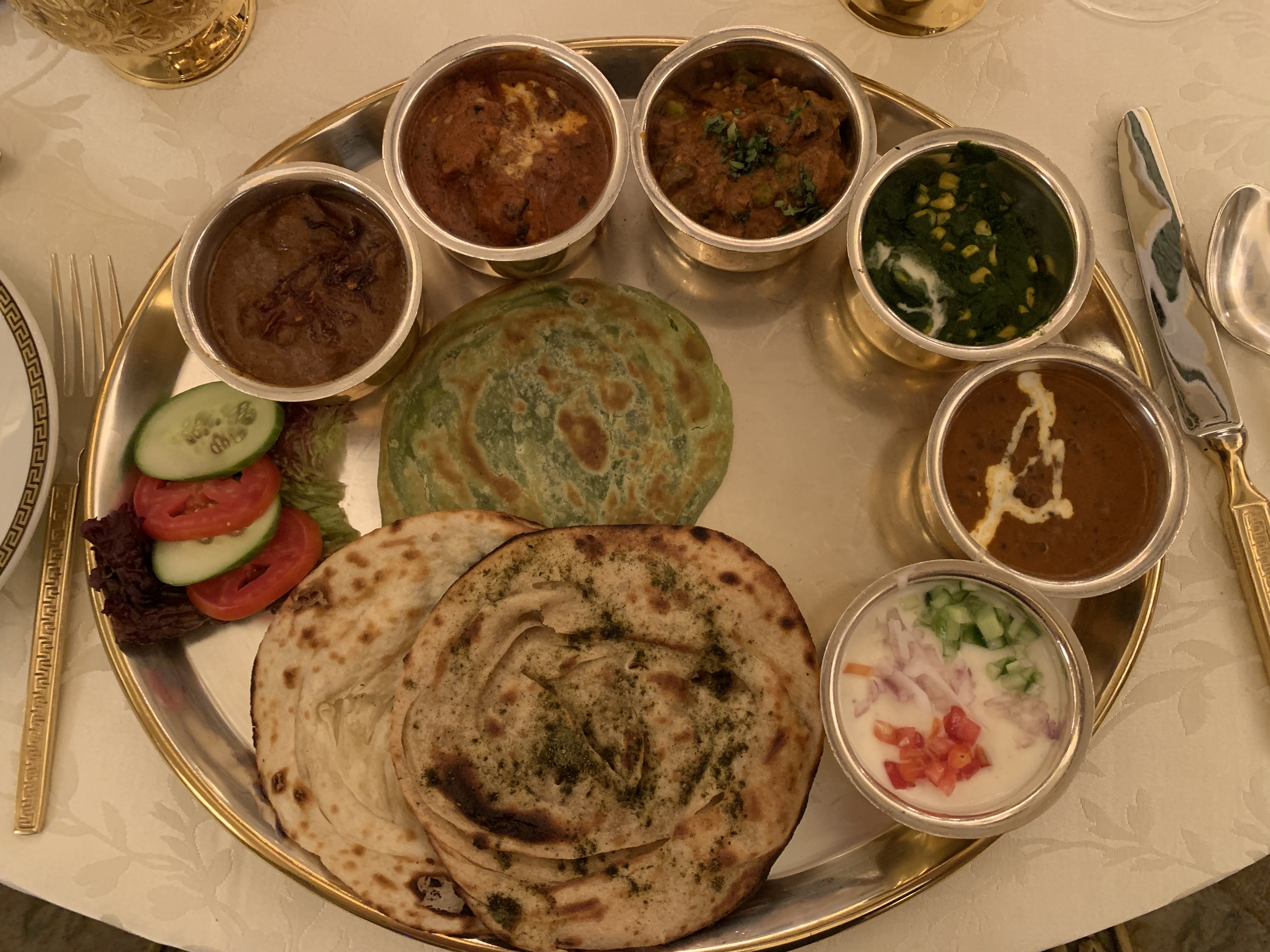
Royal Rajasthani Thali served at Rambagh Palace, Jaipur

== Rajput cuisine ==
Rajasthani cuisine is also influenced by the Rajputs, who traditionally consume sacrificial meat only. Their diet consisted of game meat which is procured only via Jhatka method. Some of the non vegetarian lamb dishes like Ratto Maans (meat in red gravy), Dhaulo Maans (meat in white gravy) and Jungli maans (game meat cooked with basic ingredients). Another popular non vegetarian dish from Rajasthan is Maans ra Soola, which is a kind of spitted or skewered meat. Another dish is Sohita or Soyeta, delectably made from chicken, millets, ginger and chilli.

Apart from lamb, chicken and freshwater fish are also cooked; for example Bhuna Kukada and Macchli Jaisamandi. Another royal non vegetarian recipe is Khadd Khargosh or Khadd Susalyo is a curried rabbit dish, based on a traditional Indian hunter dish common in the days of the Rajput kings, where the rabbits would be wrapped in leaves and baked in a freshly dug pit which acted as an oven. Mokal is another non vegetarian dish which is prepared from rabbit meat cooked with lemon, almond and nutmeg.

== Rajasthani barbecue techniques ==
Rajasthani cooking employs use of Barbecue, grilling and baking techniques for preparing an array of foods. Various cooking equipments are used in Rajasthani culinary tradition for this purpose. Every household has its own grill locally known by the name Sigdi (Sanskrit: शकटी, Śakṭī) or Angithi (Sanskrit: अग्निस्थिका, Agnisthikā). Clay ovens called bhatthi or tandoor are also very common. In fact, these clay ovens i.e. Bhatthi (Sanskrit: भ्राष्ट्र Bhrāshtra) or tandoor originated in Rajasthan. Indus Valley site : Kalibangan in Rajasthan has the earliest archaeological evidence of using clay ovens resembling present day tandoors. These Sigdis/Angithis/Bhatthis or tandoors would then be used for baking breads like Baati, Angakadi, Baphla, Angarki roti, Kinwani roti (fermented flour roti). Often Soolas of maans (meat), macchli (fish) & chhena (cottage cheese) were barbecued using skewers in these clay oven. Khadd ka Pind is yet another barbecue technique employed by Rajasthan royal princes while their hunting expeditions.

== Breads ==
Since Rajasthan is mostly an arid state, wheat and millets form the staple diet instead of rice (which are common in rest of India).

Various breads are prepared from wheat like tawa roti, Angarki/Tandoori roti, Kinwani roti (naturally fermented flour roti) etc. Khoba Roti is a special roti from Rajasthan which is prepared by pinching the dough to make a beautiful pattern of indentations on roti. It is very common to prepare large sized rotis called Rotlas/Bhakri using flour of millets like Bajra (Pearl millet), Makai (Maize), Jowar etc.

Gram flour is usually mixed with wheat flour to prepare missi atta which is then used to prepare Missi Roti. Sometimes, multigrain flatbread called Bejad Roti is prepared by mixing wheat flour with jowar flour and besan. Tikkad is another typical Rajasthani bread which is prepared by blend of flours and vegetables. Kanda Tamatar Tikkad and Bajra Mooli Tikkad are some common variations of Tikkad.

Deep fried breads include: puris & kachauris (stuffed with dal pithi, vegetables, mawa etc.). Kanda Kachauri, prepared using stuffing of onion based mixture is a speciality of Rajasthani cuisine. Mawa Kachauri is sweet version of Kachauri stuffed with mawa. Jhakolma Puri is a speciality of Mewari cuisine which is a large sized puri prepared using wheat dough of flowing consistency. It is served with Chana Dal and Amchur chutney.

Pan cooked breads like parathas (mostly stuffed with vegetables, dals or chhena), cheelas, pudlas, tikkads, malpuas etc. One unique paratha of Rajasthan is Korma Paratha or Dal Churi Paratha which is prepared using korma or dal churi (semi crushed coarse lentils and its husk). Some common varaitions of Cheelas include Besan Cheela and Mogar Cheela. using Baked breads include Baatis, Angarki roti/Tandoori roti, Angarki paratha, Kinwani roti etc.

== Desserts and sweet dishes ==
Rajasthani culinary tradition is known for array of sweet dishes and desserts emanating from Naivedhya tradition of Hindu temples.

Milk and its products like chhena, mawa, malai, makhan, ghee, rabdi are used abundantly in many of the Rajasthani sweets & desserts.

Owing to dry atmosphere of Rajasthan, Besan (gram flour) and lentils are also commonly used for preparing desserts apart from wheat flour.

The Vaishnavite traditions of Rajasthan like Pushtimarg, Nimabarka and Ramanandi are known for their Naivedheya and Chhapan Bhog tradition in their temples. In this tradition, the temple deity is offered royally embellished food and sweets rich in dry fruits and milk products. These embellished sweets were then distributed amongst common people and devotees visiting the temple. Such culinary temple traditions were patronized by Rajput royals and wealthy Baniya merchants of Rajasthan.

In Rajasthan each and every festival and religious occasion is associated with some unique dessert. Some of the popular Rajasthani desserts are:

- Ghevar: A honeycombed shaped cake made by deep frying batter of wheat flour in ghee and then soaking it in sugar syrup. Ghevar is offered as Naivedheya to Hindu God Shiva & Goddess Parvati during Teej festival.
- Laapsi: This is a pudding prepared using grain flour cooked in ghee along with milk, dry fruits & sugar. Various variations of Laapsi are Daliya Laapsi, Suji Laapsi (Mohan Bhog), Maida Laapsi (Sohan Bhog), Besan Laapsi, Moong Dal Laapsi, Rajwaadi Badam/Suphal Laapsi etc. Kusum Laapsi (Gulab Laapsi) is Rose petal flavoured Laapsi popular in Paali. Suji Laapsi and Puri forms Naivedhya for Durga Ashtami festival. While, Moong Dal Laapsi is common during Diwali festival
- Jhajhariya: Prepared using hara choliya or corn flour, Jhajhariya is one variety of Laapsi.
- Panjeeri: The word Panjeeri is derived from Sanskrit word Panchjeerak which means blend of five herbal ingredients. Panchjeerak is used as an Ayurvedic post partum nutritional supplement and as a medicine for puerperial disorders. From this panchjeerak evolved the Panjeeri sweet which also involves blend of herbal ingredients like saunth (dry ginger), black peppercorns etc. Panjeeri is hence prepared on Janamashtami as a Naivedhya to offer to Bhagwan Krishna's mothers Devaki and Yasodha.
- Paag: The sweet Paag also evolved from an Ayurvedic concoction called Paak. Paag or Paak refers to fruits/vegetables cooked & coated in sugar syrup. Mawa and Mewa (dry fruits) are then added to this mixture. Common examples include: Panchmewa Paag, Gaajar Paag, Lauki Paag, Nariyal Paag, Kohlaa Paag etc.
- Laadu (Laddu): Varieties of Laddus are prepared in Rajasthan. However, the most popular ones include: Marwari Boondi Laddu, Motichoor Laddu, Besan Laddu etc. These are offered to Bhagwan Ganesh as Naivedhya. Panchdhari Laddu is a special laddu variety popular in Bikaner.
- Katri, Khandli & Chakki: These are cuboid or rhomboid or disc shaped slices of sweet fudge/pudding mixture which gets set on cooling. Katri, Khandli and Chakki are almost same except for their shape and thickness. Katri is rhomboid shaped thin slice while Khandli is cuboid shaped thick slice and Chakki can be cuboid or disc shaped. Some of the popular variants of Katri include : Kaju Katri, Pista Katri, Badam Katri, Mawa Katri. Variants of Chakki include: Moong Dal Chakki, Besan Chakki, Dal Badam Chakki etc. It is common tradition to offer Besan Chakki as a Naivedya in Hanuman temples.
- Panchdhari Kat : It is a special Katli prepared using milk or mawa or milk powder, mixed with suji and besan flour.
- Gujhiya: Wheat dough is stuffed with Mawa & dry fruits mixture and moulded into circular semi lunar shapes. These are then fried and soaked in sugar syrup. Gujhiya is a popular dessert prepared during Holi festival.
- Sutra pheni: These are thready cakes prepared by frying the dough in ghee. Sutra pheni resembles thin version of vermicelli (Seviyan). It is commonly prepared during Karwa Chauth festival and during Kartik & Margashirsha month.
- Dudhiya Kheech: Milk and rice based sweet popular in Udaipur.
- Mawa Kachauri: Kachauri stuffed with Mawa.
- Mohanthaar: Besan based sweet dish with a grainy texture specially prepared for Janamashtami and Diwali festival. It is named after Lord Krishna.
- Boondi & Ratna Boondi (nowadays branded as Diljaani) : These forms important part of Naivedhya to Hanumanji.
- Tilpatti of Beawar: A sweet bar of sesame and jaggery with some dry fruits or nuts. Very commonly eaten in Magh month and Sakraat festival.
- Makhan Bada (or Baalusaahi) : It is a glazed doughnut soaked in sugar syrup. It is similar to Baati in size.
- Gud Gatta (or Kadaka): Crunchy toffee/candy of Jaggery which has a honey comb texture. Peanuts & other dry fruits are added to it. It is specifically prepared on Makar Sankranti festival.
- Churma: It is made by crumbling Baati or roti in ghee and boora sugar or Gud (local jaggery).

Other popular sweets include: Jalebi, Imarti, Mawa Jamun, Rasgulla, Rabdi, Ras Malai, Palang Torh, Milk-Cake (Alwar ka Mawa) etc.

== Typical Rajasthani dishes ==
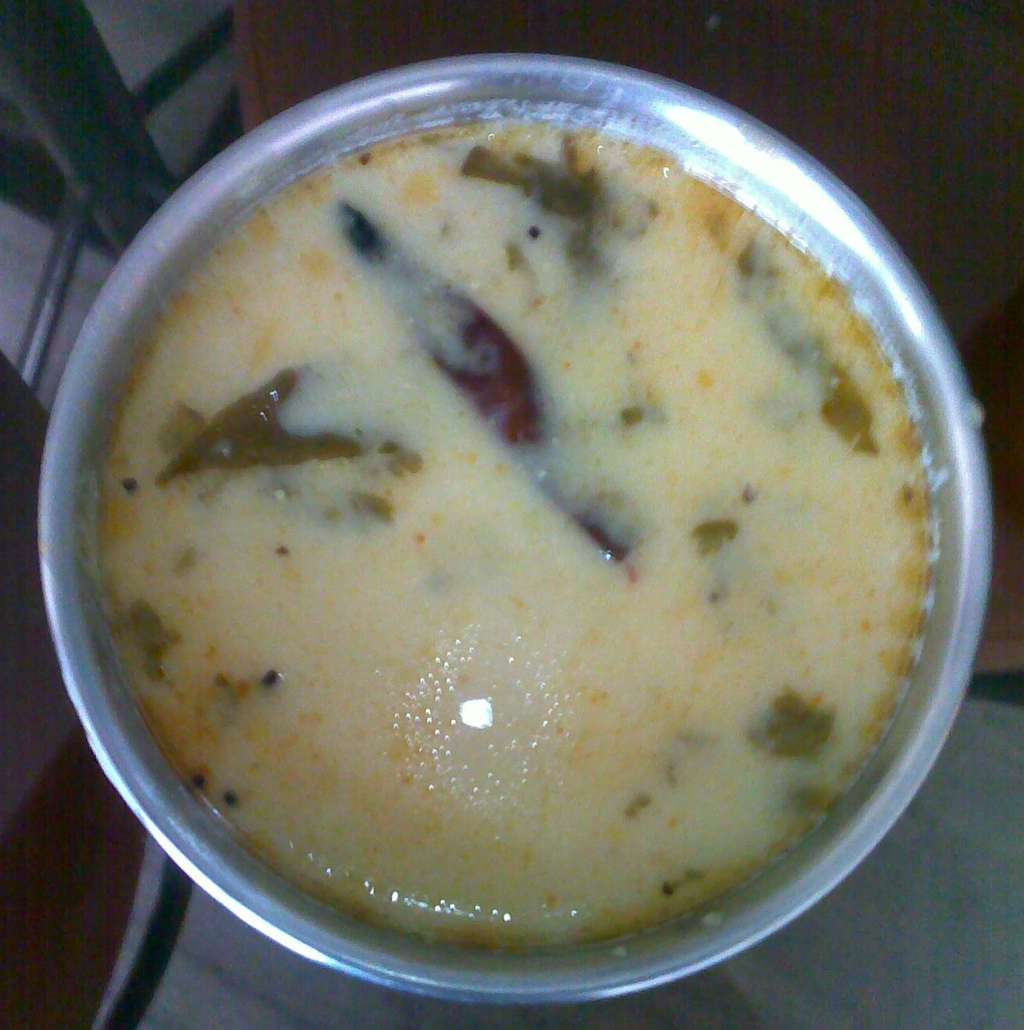
Kadhi

=== Dal Pahit (Lentil soups) ===
Use of lentils and pulses is very common in Rajasthani cuisine. The combination of Dal & Roti forms the staple diet of Rajasthan.

- Rajasthani Panchratna Dal: This is a special lentil preparation which involves combination of five different kinds of lentils viz. toor dal, urad dal, moong dal, chana dal and moth dal. It is served along with Baati bread and churma and combo is called Dal Baati Churma .
- Dal Dhokli: This is a common dish for Rajasthani and Gujarati cuisine. Dal is cooked with small wheat dough pasta pieces. It is also known as Dal Pithouri.
- Dal Baakla: Baakla or Sukhi Dal refers to dry gravy-less preparations. Sukhi Moong (Mogar ro saag), Sukhi Moth (Mothan ro saag), Sukhi Urad dal are commonly used for preparing Baakla. The word Baakla is derived from Sanskrit word Vāṣkala.
- Rajasthani Dal Maharani/Dal Rajwadi : This is prepared using whole Urad dal in a rich gravy of dry fruits and topped with lots of ghee.
- Haveji : A lentil preparation made by cooking Chana Dal with Yogurt or buttermilk gravy.

==== Dal Based preparations ====
Apart from lentil soups, a number of food preparations are made using lentils like mangodi, pakodas, pittod, gatte, sev, pappad etc. Gram flour called besan and moong flour called mogar are frequently used in Rajasthani cuisine.

- Mangodi ro saag : Mangodi refers to fritters made from moong dal, which are used to make a veg preparation called Mangodi ro saag. Various variations include: Palak Mangodi, Methi Mangodi, Kanda Mangodi, Aloo Mangodi and Papad Mangodi ro saag.
- Pittod ro saag & Pittod ro teewan : The rhomboid shaped steamed besan slices called Pittod or Chakki are used to prepare this dish. This can be prepared with or without gravy. If prepared with gravy then yogurt is added to prepare gravy.
- Govind Gatte ro saag : Gatte are dumplings made from besan which are cooked in gravy of yogurt. Govind Gatte is the royal version of these dumplings which are stuffed with mixture of mawa/chhena and dry fruits like almonds, cashews and figs. The dish is named after Govind Dev ji (a form of Shri Krishna); for whom the dish is prepared as a bhog.
- Papad ro saag : Papad are crisps made from lentil flour. They are cooked along with spices, condiments & other ingredients like onions, badis to prepare Papad Kanda ro saag, Papad badi ro saag etc.
- Besan Childa ro saag: Vegetable preparation made using savory pancakes called Childas.
- Rajasthani Kadhi Pakoda: Rajasthani Kadhi is prepared from yogurt or buttermilk based gravy to which besan is added. Pakodas and vegetables are also added to it. It is served with bhaat (rice), bajra or makai rotla.
- Sev tamatar ro teewan: Thick vermicelli like besan noodles called Sev are cooked along with tomato for preparing this saucy dish.
- Gatte matar khichadi: It is Khichdi prepared by mixing gatte with green peas.

=== Millet based preparations ===
- Raab : It is prepared by cooking millet flour in buttermilk. Common millets which are used are: Makai, Bajra & Jowar. Raab is regarded as a nutritious food.
- Ghaat : A dish similar to raab but made with millet porridge instead of millet flour. It is also prepared either with of millets viz. Corn, pearl millet, sorghum or barley. Ghaat is a popular cereal breakfast in Rajasthan.
- Dhoklo : A steamed round cake prepared from flour of makai, chana, bajra etc.
- Bajra Khichdi : It is prepared by combining Bajra with some lentil like: moong, moth, tuvar or urad. Sometimes green peas and spinach are also added to this dish.
- Sirawadi/Rabodi ro saag : Sirawadi/Rabodi is a crisp papad prepared from millets like jowar or makai. These are then used for vegetable preparation just like papad ro saag.

=== Vegetable preparations ===
Some unique vegetables used in Rajasthan are: Ker (Capparis decidua), Sangri (Prosopis cineraria), Gunda (Cordia dichotoma), Kumatiya (Acacia senegal), Guar phali (cluster bean), Moringa (drumstick), Kikoda (spiny gourd), Kamal kakdi (lotus stem), Kachri (Cucumis pubescence), fogla, borkut ber, fofaliya (dry tinda). Other common vegetables of Rajasthan are Aloo (potatoes), Kanda (onion), Bhindi (okra), Gajar (carrot) cucurbits like pumpkin and ash gourd. Greens of Sarson (mustard), Chana (gram), bathua, methi (fenugreek) are also commonly used. Vegetable preparations are often called Saag, while saucy preparations are called Teewan or Teeman. The combo of Saag & Rota forms part of staple diet of Rajasthan.

- Ker Sangri saag : Ker Sangri is a Rajasthani delicacy that is made using dried Ker berries and Sangri beans. This bean and berry combo unique to Rajasthan.
- Panchkuta saag : Panchkuta primarily consists of five ingredients (Ker, Sangri, Kumatiya, Gunda and Kachari/Aamchur). This dish is specially made a day prior to Basoda (Shitala Ashtami) festival.
- Kaju Ker Dakh: This vegetable preparation is made using combo of Ker berries with dry fruits like: Dakh (raisins) and Kaju (cashews) in a yogurt based gravy. Sometimes methi (fenugreek) is also added.
- Moringa ro saag: A vegetable preparation made from moringa (drumstick) stem and flowers. Potatoes are also added to it.
- Kanda ro saag: Onions are called Kanda in Rajasthani. Use of Kanda is quite common in Rajasthan. Some dishes include: Akkha Kanda ro saag (Whole onion preparation), Kanda bhindi (Okra with onion), Kanda Chhena (Cottage cheese with onion), Kanda Khumb (mushroom with onion) etc.
- Guar-phali ri bhurji (Phulgara): Guar-phali (cluster bean) based vegetable preparation which is prepared by stir frying.
- Kikoda ro saag: Kikoda (spiny gourd) based vegetable preparation.
- Haldi ro saag: Rajasthani winter special dish made using fresh turmeric, ghee, yogurt, vegetables and spices.
- Athani teewan: Athani teewan refers to a saucy preparation made by Athana (pickle) masala. Some examples include: Athani baigan/rigan teewan, Athani aloo teewan, Athani bhindi teewan, Athani karela teewan etc.
- Besan teewan: Vegetables coated with besan batter and fried are used to prepare a saucy preparation. For example. Rajasthani Besan Bhindi, Besan Karela and Besan Rigan (Besan Baigan) teewan.
- Kabuli—Veg layered Pulao
- Lacha Pakori
- Gulab Jamun ki Sabzi
- Aloo matar ro saag
- dahi mein aloo
- Dal Chawal Kutt
- danamethi
- Gajar ro saag
- Jaipuri
- Karela ro saag
- Kicha ro saag
- Lauki ra Koftey
- Matar ro saag
- Meethi danamethi
- Kanda Chhena/Paneer
- Bharma Tinda
- Aam ki kadhi
- Jaipuri mewa Pulao
- Kalmi vada
- Dal Banjari

== Beverages ==
- Amlana: Amlana is a Rajasthani beverage prepared with tamarind pulp, perked up with spices like pepper and cardamom. Black salt and mint leaves are added to enhance its flavour. Imli ra Amlana is a lesser known drink from the bylanes of Marwar region.
- Bajra Raab: Bajra Raab is a soothing porridge dish prepared using Bajra (pearl millet) which is regarded as an immunity boosting mid day drink. It can be served both sweetened and savory.
- Bael Panna : This Ayurvedic coolant drink is prepared from bael fruit (wood apple) and is commonly during Mekh Sakrant festival.
- Sattu Panna : A traditional Ayurvedic barley based drink which is also commonly prepared on Mekh Sakrant festival.
- Kairi Panna : Raw Mango (locally called Kairi) based drink which is popular all over India.
- Kaanji : Traditional Ayurvedic coolant drink made from carrots or beetroot. It is served along with badas and the combination is called Kanji Bada.
- Thandai : Traditional dairy drink which is prepared for Holi festival.
- Ganna Ras : Sugarcane juice based drink which is flavored using mint, ginger, lemon and rock salt.
- Haldi Doodh : Turmeric based dairy drink which is commonly prepared during winters and consumed as an immunity booster.
- Nimbu Paani: Indian style lemonade which can be flavored with rock salt, mint, edible gum, cumin etc.
- Masala Lassi/Chaach: Buttermilk based drink flavoured using herbs & spices such as cumin, mint and asafoetida.

== Snacks ==
- Kadke sev
- Lahsun sev/namkeen
- Kadhi kachori
- Methi mathhri
- Bikaneri bhujiya
- Chana Dal Namkeen
- Rajasthani Gathiya

== Chutneys, launji, chhunda and athana pickles ==
=== Launji ===
Launji refers to sweet and tangy relish prepared from vegetables or fruits, which is served as an accompaniment in a Rajasthani meal. Variations of Launji include:

- Kairi launji: prepared from kairi (raw mango) slices.
- Methi amchur launji: prepared from methi (fenugreek) seeds which is combined either with chhuhara (dried dates) or daakh (raisins). Amchur (dry mango powder) is added for a sour taste.
- Karonda launji: prepared from karonda (Indian Natal plum)
- Amla launji: prepared from Amla (Indian gooseberry )

=== Chhunda ===
Many a times, sweet preserves are made from fruits and the preparation is called Chhunda. Some variations include:

- Aam Chhunda: Mango based chhunda, commonly prepared in summers.
- Amla Chhunda: Indian gooseberry chhunda, commonly prepared in winters.
- Gajar Chhunda: carrot based chhunda.
- Bael Chhunda: wood apple based chhunda.

=== Athana ===
Athana or Athano are pickles prepared in Rajasthani and North Indian cuisine. Some varaitions include:

- Mathania Mirchi Athana: Special chillies from Mathania village are used for preparing this pickle.
- Kairi Athana: Raw Mango pickle
- Kachri Athana
- Gunda Athana
- Ker Sangri Athana
- Pachranga Athana: It is a five colored (pachranga) pickle made using cauliflower, carrot, turnip, lemon, karonda, lotus stem, gooseberry, dry mango powder etc. Pachranga is a Rajasthani word for five colored item like pachrangi paag (five colored turban).

=== Mirchi tipore ===
An instant pickle made from chopped green chillies is called mirchi tipore. This is different from mirchi athana as tipore is an instant pickle prepared using chopped chillies, while mirchi athana is prepared using whole slit chillies (usually stuffed).

=== Chutneys ===
- Rajasthani lehsun chutney: Garlic is the main ingredient in this chutney. Variations include lehsun ratto mirch chutney, dahi lehsun chutney, and bhuna lehsun pudina chutney.
- Kachri chutney: prepared from kachri, wild melon seeds.
- Kairi kanda chutney: made from kairi (raw mango) and kanda (onion).
- Dhaniya pudina chutney: made using dhaniya (coriander) and pudina (mint).

== Post-prandial digestives ==
- Rajwadi mukhwas
- Paniya churio: A post-prandial digestive made of crushed millet bread, jaggery and warm ghee. It is a speciality of Mewari cuisine.

== See also ==
- List of Indian cuisine
- North Indian cuisine
