= Panchratna dal =

Vegetarian dish of Indian origin

Panchratna dal (also panchmel dal in Rajasthani cuisine or pancha dhal in Caribbean cuisine) is a popular dal in the Indian subcontinent and Indian-origin communities in Guyana, Suriname, and Trinidad and Tobago. Lentils are an integral part of Indian cuisine. This is a dish customarily served on special occasions. It is usually accompanied by an Indian flatbread or roti.

== Etymology ==
As the name suggests, based on the Sanskrit root panch for five, panchratna dal is made by combining five different kinds of dals (lentils) common to Indian households. The word ratna means jewels and mel means mix. Hence, panchratna and panchmel mean 'five jewels' and 'mixture of five dals' respectively.

== Composition of a panchratna dal ==
Traditionally, a panchratna dal mixture contains equal quantities of toor dal, urad dal, moong dal, chana dal and masoor dal. The dal mixture is first soaked in water to soften the lentils. This mixture is then pressure-cooked for 15 minutes till the dal is cooked. The cooked dal is then flavoured with butter, chilies, cumin, cloves, cardamom, ginger and garam masala.

Some recipes substitute masoor dal for the moth dal, which is less commonly available in some regions than the other four dals.

== See also ==
- Rajasthani cuisine
- Dal bati churma
- Dal badam chakki
- Kanda kachauri
- Laapsi
