= Kachori =

Indian deep-fried pastry

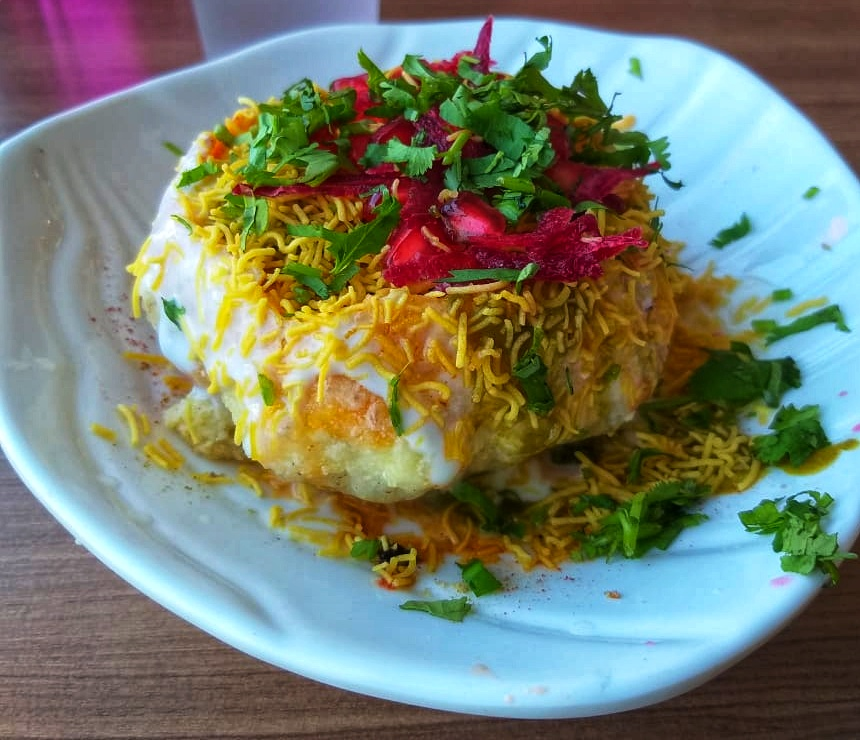
- Raj kachori
- Alternative names: Kachauri, kachodi, katchuri
- Course: Snack
- Place of origin: India
- Region or state: Rajasthan
- Associated cuisine: India, Nepal, Bangladesh, Pakistan, Trinidad and Tobago
- Serving temperature: Hot or warm
- Main ingredients: Maida (flour), gram flour, ghee
- Ingredients generally used: Moong dal, onions
- Variations: Pyaaz kachori, kota kachori, raj kachori, mawa kachori, dahi-kheerey ki kachori

Kachori, kachodi, katchuri, kachuri or kachauri (pronounced [kətʃɔːɽi]) is a deep-fried, spicy, stuffed pastry or bread originating from the Marwar region of Rajasthan, India. It is made of maida filled with a baked mixture of moong dal or onions (usually, depending on the variation), besan, coriander, red chili powder, salt, and other Indian spices and deep-fried in vegetable oil until crispy golden brown. It is served with potato curry and sometimes with sweet and spicy tamarind chutney or occasionally with mint and green chilli chutney.

Originating in India, kachoris have become popular throughout South Asia, each region adding its own local variations.

== History ==
The kachori is believed to have originated from the Marwar region of Rajasthan, India. The use of mild spices like coriander and fennel in the kachori's preparation is thought to be a reflection of the region's climatic conditions, making it well-suited for the dry and hot environment. Over time, the kachori gained popularity as a convenient travel snack.

An early known recipe similar to kachori comes from Susruta Samhita, which mentions a deep-fried pastry made from flour, ghee, and jaggery stuffed with spiced mung dal or minced meat. Another recipe for a dish known as "Kacchari", a puffy deep-fried pastry stuffed with lentils, finds mention in a Jain text dating back to the 7th century. Similar recipes are also mentioned in the medieval cookbook Supa Shastra.

Banarasidas, the author of the biographical Ardhakathanaka, mentioned buying kachoris in Indore in 1613. For seven months, he bought a ser of kachoris daily, and owed twenty rupees.

== Variations ==
List of variations based on stuffing:

- Pyaaz kachori: Pyaaz kachori or kanda kachori originated in the city of Jodhpur, Rajasthan. As its name suggests, it is stuffed with spiced pyaaz (onions).

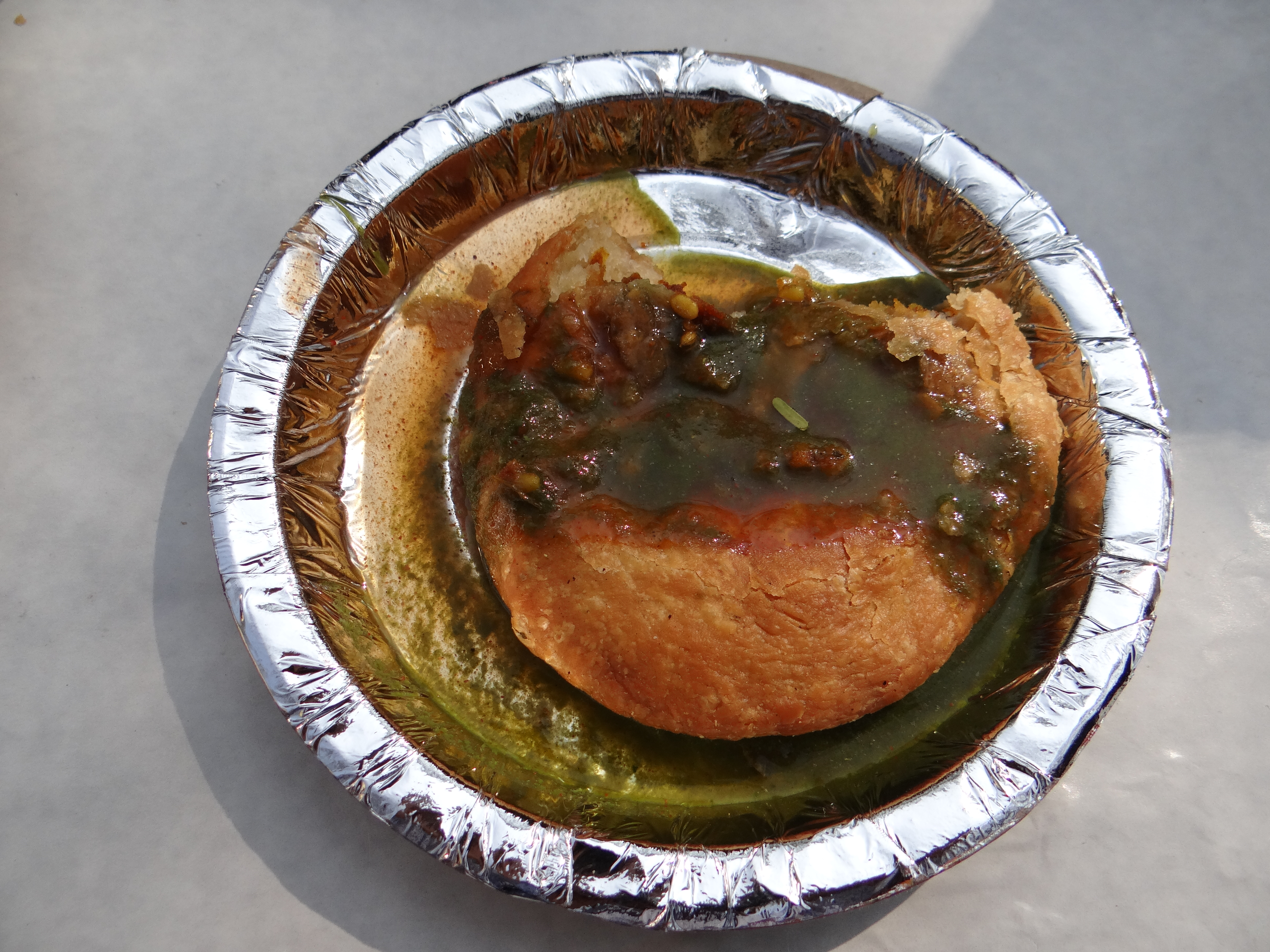
Kanda kachori with mint and green chilli chutney

- Raj kachori(s): Originating in the city of Bikaner, Rajasthan, raj kachoris are now popular throughout North India. "Raj", in Hindi, means "royal" or "grand", referring to the rich stuffing of the kachori. It is typically topped with yogurt, spices, cilantro chutney, sweet tamarind chutney, sev and pomegranate.

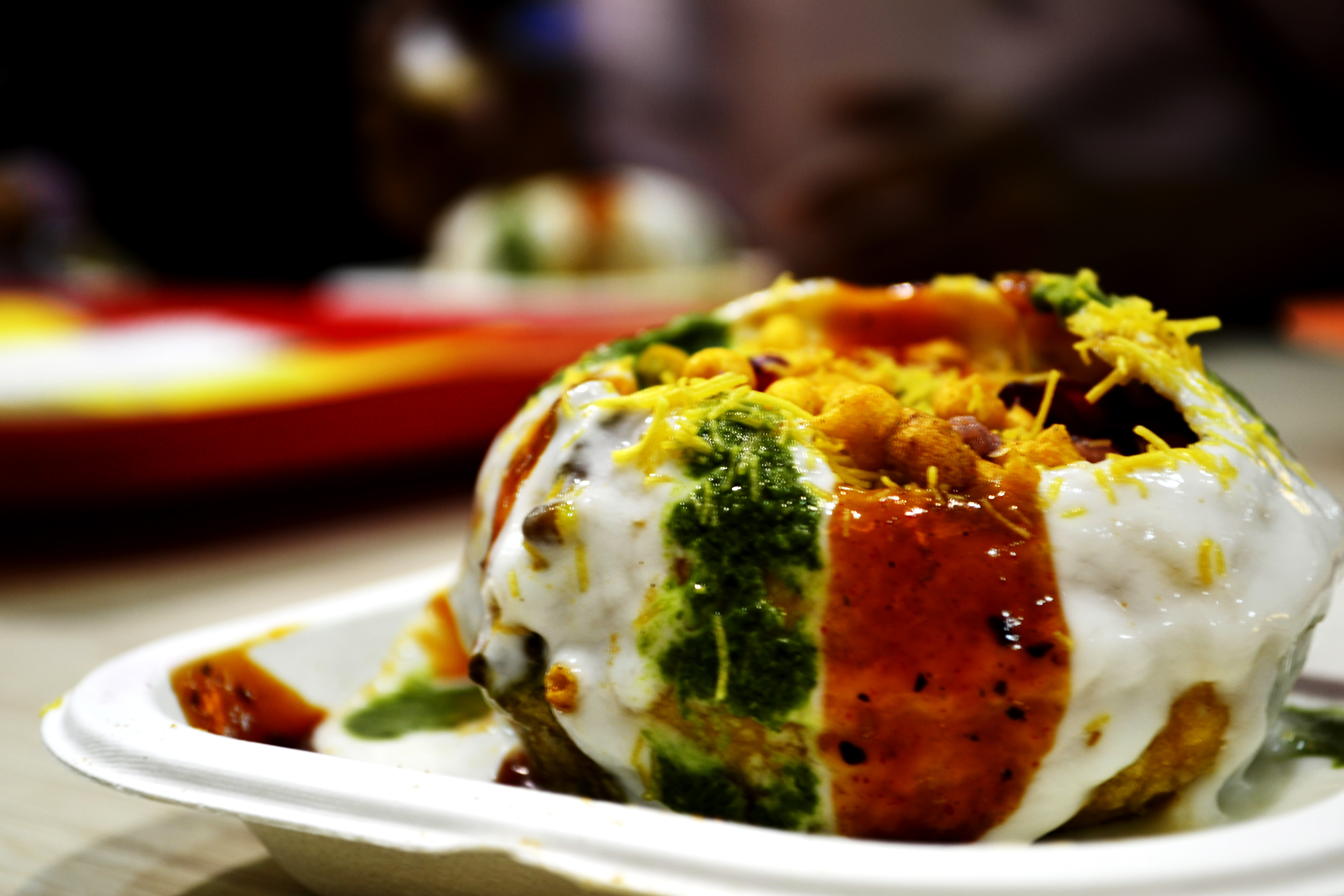
Raj kachori from Haldiram's

- Kota Kachori(s): Originating in the city of Kota in Rajasthan, they are known for their spicy flavour, with a distinct smell of asafoetida. The filling of a Kota Kachori consists of yellow mung dal (split yellow lentils) cooked with a blend of spices and herbs, including cumin, ginger, green chili, turmeric, and coriander.
- Mawa Kachori: This variant originated in the city of Jodhpur, Rajasthan. It is stuffed with dry fruits and khoa and later dipped in sugar syrup.
- Sooji Kachori: It is a variant made with the dough prepared from semolina (Sooji) instead of flour. It is filled with a mixture of spices, roasted semolina, and sometimes peas and potatoes.
- In Maharashtra, Shegaon Kachori is famous .
- In Gujarat, it is usually a round ball made of flour and dough filled with a stuffing of yellow mung dal, black pepper, red chili powder, and ginger paste.

Another type is fried and stuffed with pulses (urad and mung, especially) and is generally found in the Kutch region of Gujarat.

In the Bhojpuri region, Kachauri (Bhojpuri: 𑂍𑂡𑂇𑂩𑂲) is also made from whole wheat flour along with maida. It resembles Poori but has distinct taste and crunchiness which is not found in poori. Its a popular breakfast option in the region. Varanasi has popular shops selling kachori - tarkaree as a breakfast.

In West Bengal, kachori is softer and smaller. It is made mostly of white flour (maida) and asafoetida, which are often added to improve its taste. It is mostly eaten as a tea-time snack in the morning or evening and often accompanied by potato and peas curry and Bengali sweets. Also, a kachori stuffed with peas (koraishuti kochuri) is a winter delicacy in Bengal. Another variant in Bengal that exists mostly in sweet shops is the hard form (like in Delhi) with a masala inside called 'Khasta Kochuri'. Generally, no curry is accompanied by the khasta kochuri version.

Some of the variants in North India include a version similar to the Rajasthani one, accompanied by a curry made of potatoes and varied spices or chana (chole) similar to one served in chole bhature.

== Gallery ==
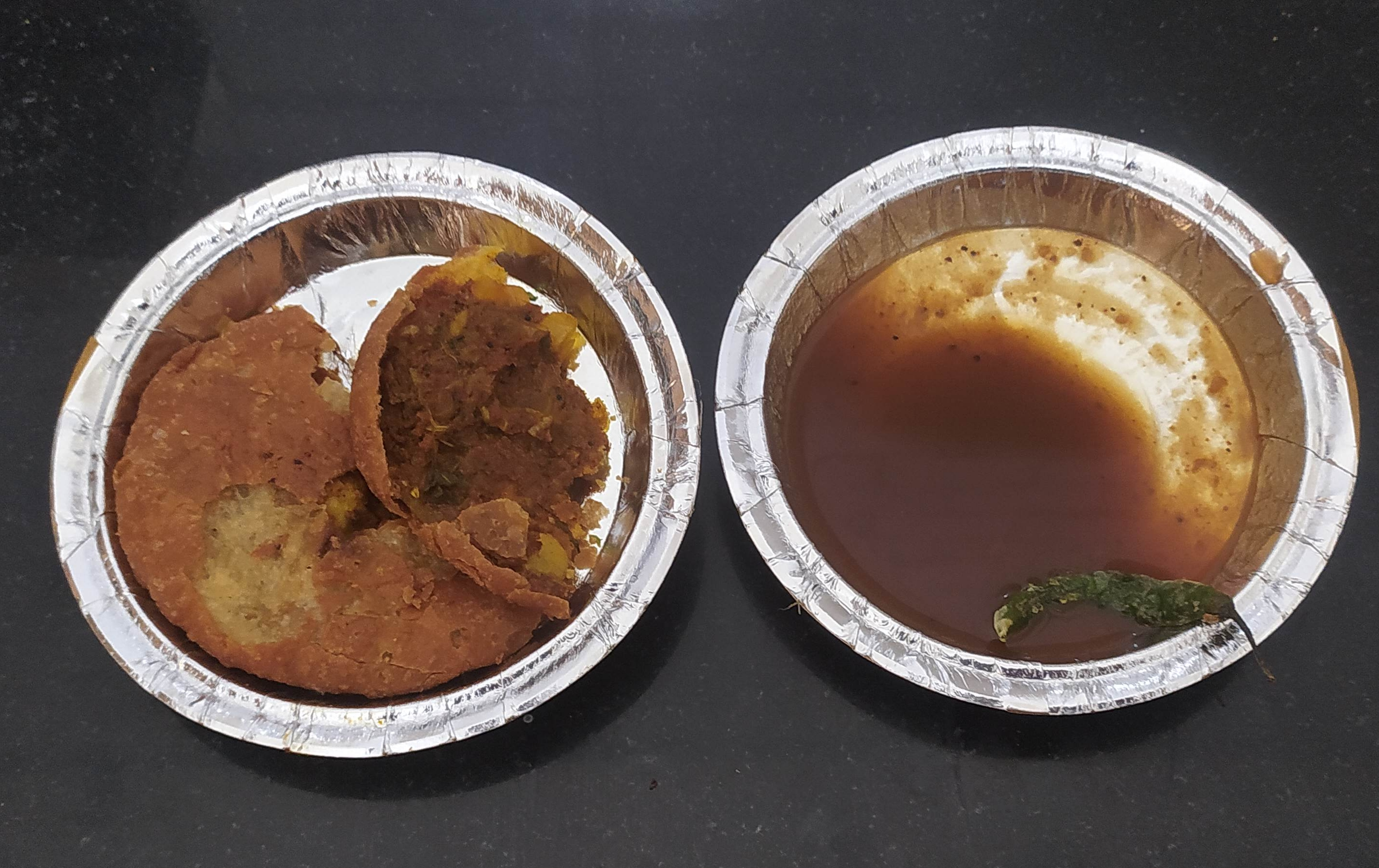
Pyaaz Kachori with tamarind chutney

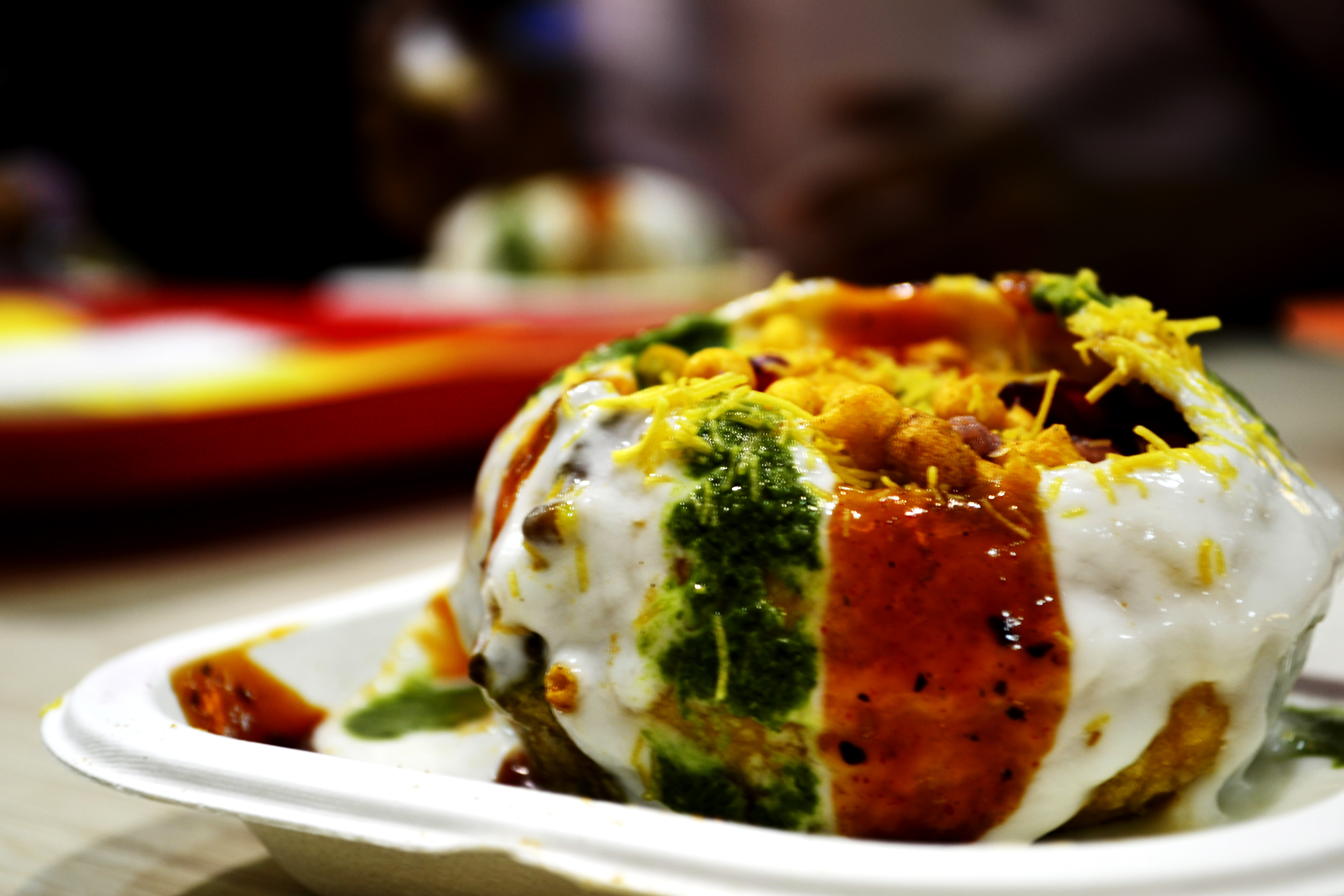
Haldiram's Raj Kachori

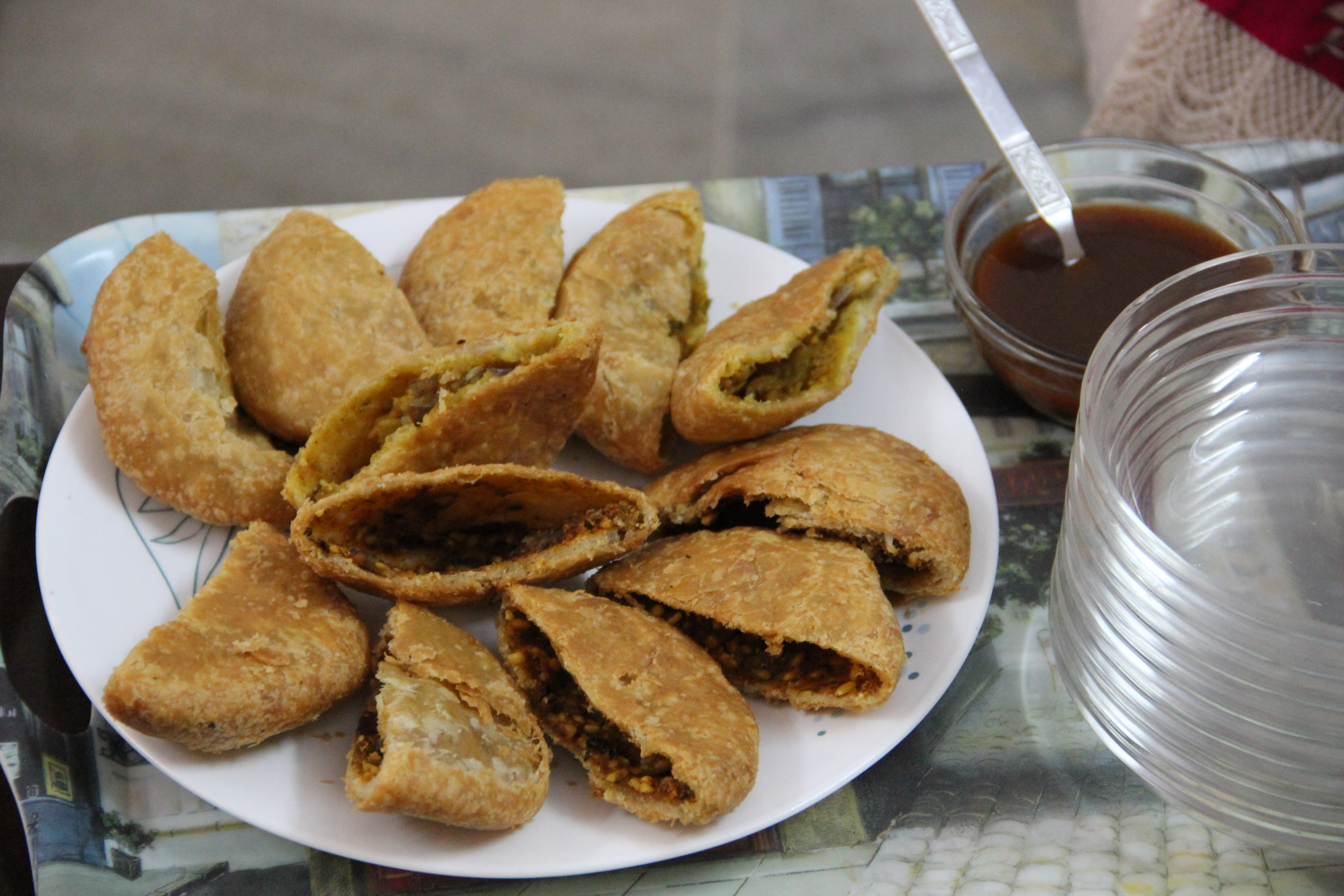
Moongdal Kachoris

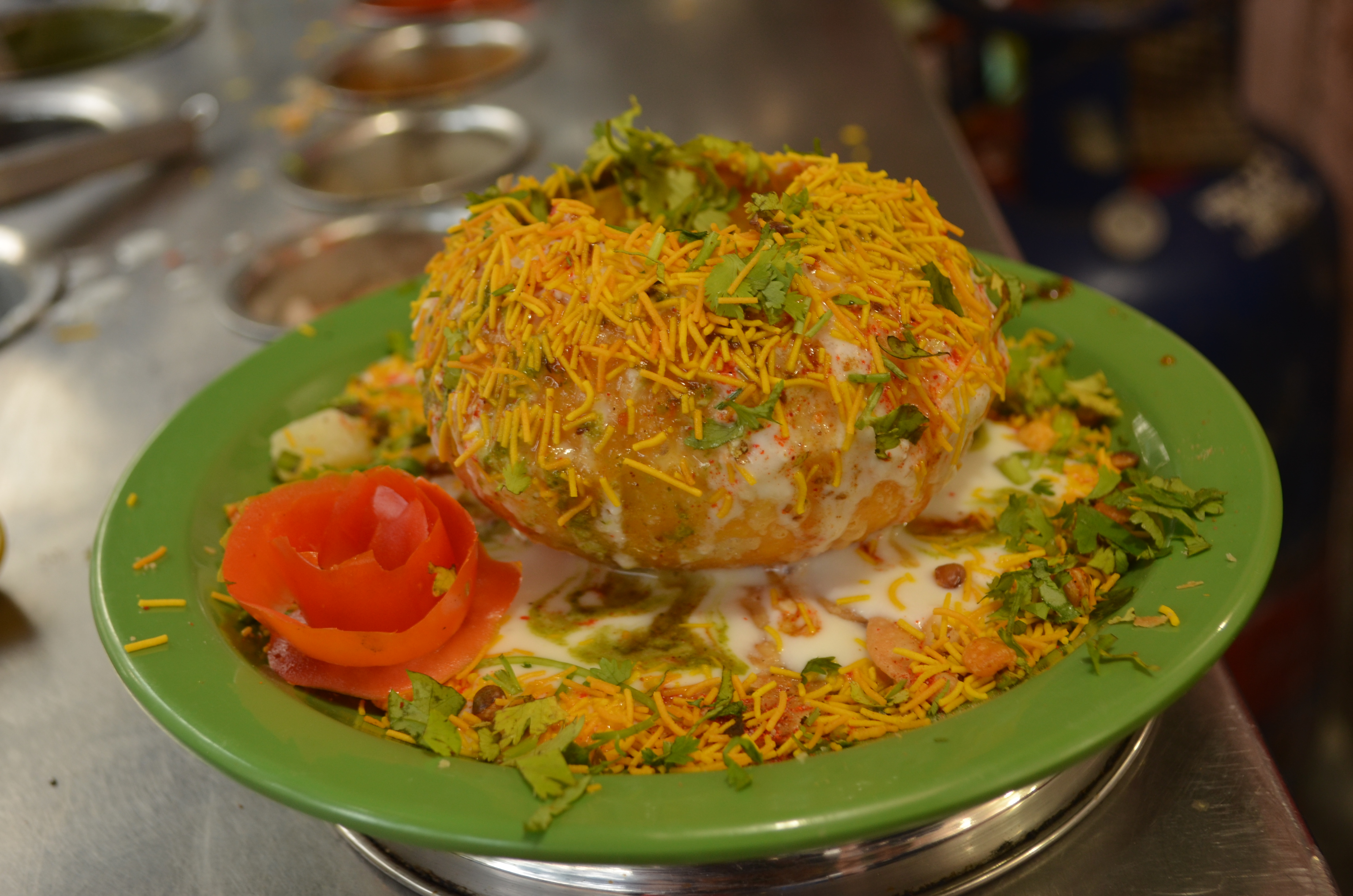
Raj Kachori with Sev

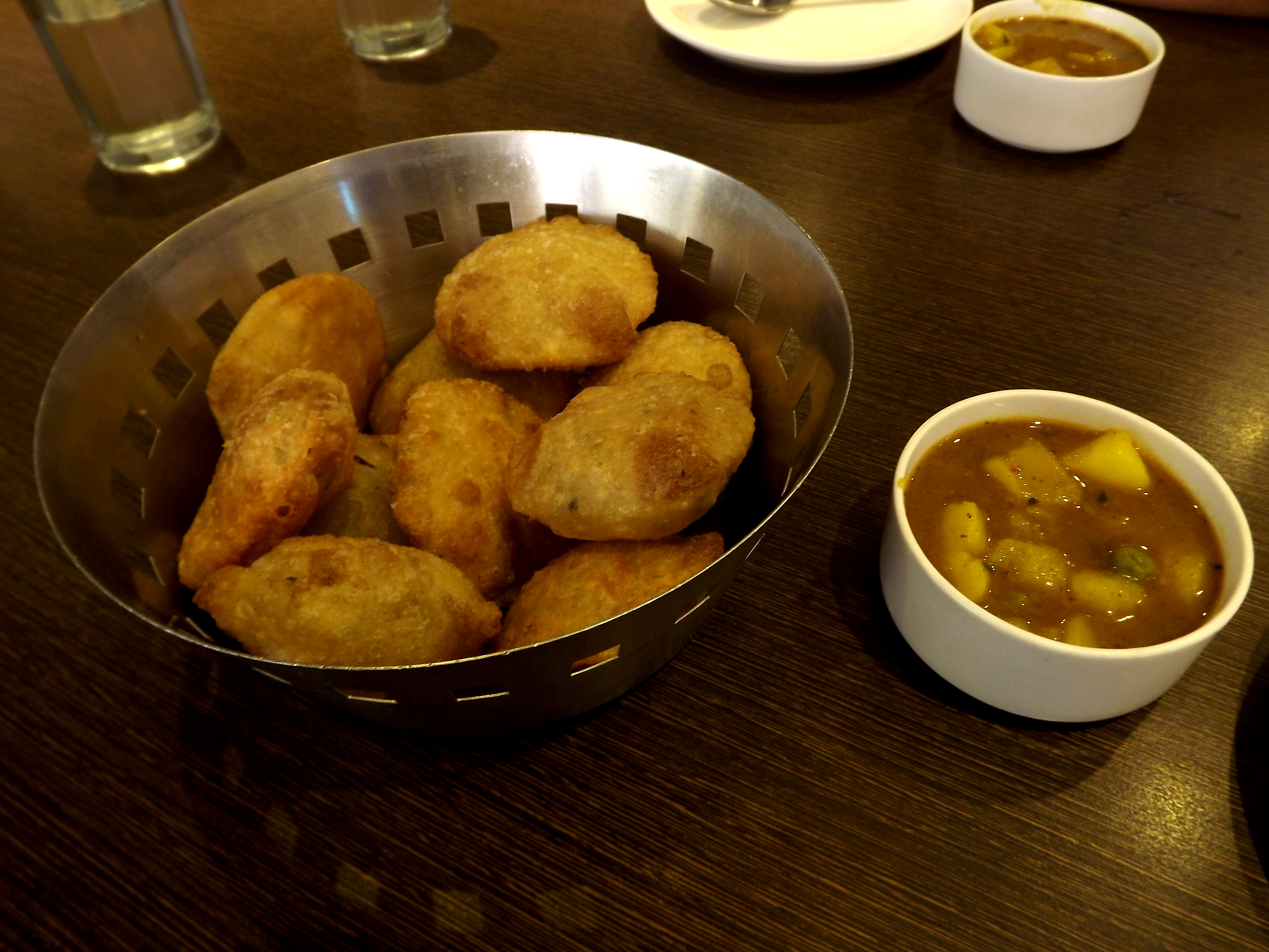
Bengali Kachoris in Kolkata

== See also ==
- Rajasthani cuisine
- Samosa
- List of stuffed dishes
- Chaat
