= Papad ki Saag-Bhaaji =

Indian vegetarian dish

Papad Ka Saag
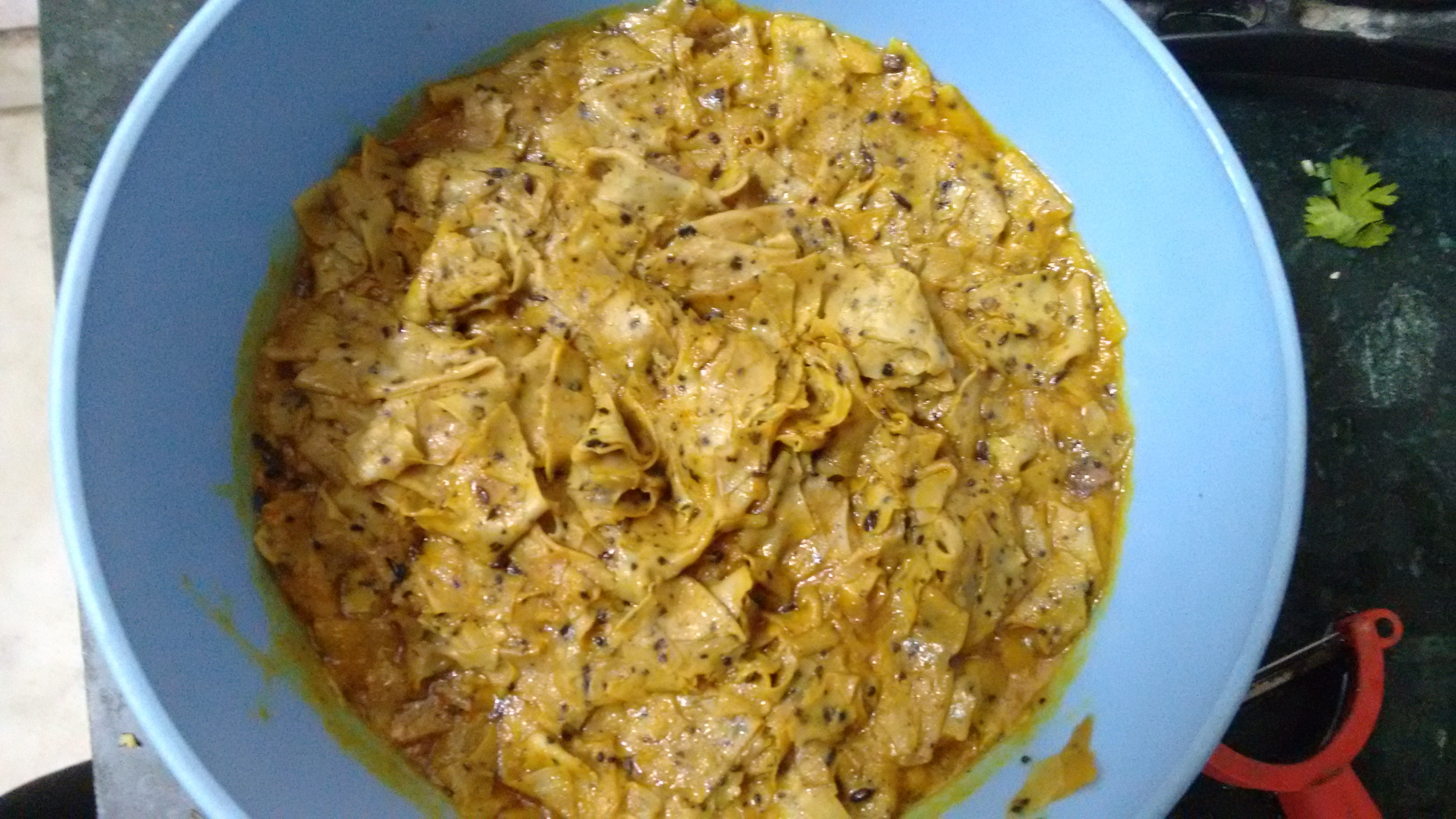
- Papad ka Saag served in a bowl
- Alternative names: Papad ki Bhaaji, Papad nu shaak
- Place of origin: Indian subcontinent
- Region or state: Rajasthan, Madhya Pradesh & Gujarat
- Associated cuisine: India
- Main ingredients: Papad

Papad ki Bhaaji or Papad ka Saag is a vegetarian main course dish made using Papad and is popular in Rajasthani, Gujarati, Bundeli, Malwi, Nimadi and Braj cuisines. The dish is prepared with many variations and is also known by the name Papad ro saag in Rajasthani and Papad nu shaak in Gujarati. Papad ki bhaaji can be easily prepared with few basic ingredients at home and without the need of any vegetable. Hence it typifies the simple food that one needs for sustenance amidst the hardships of desert life.

In India, papad is also eaten as an appetizer or snack, with toppings such as chopped onions, carrots, chutney or other dips and condiments
