= Laal maas =

Ethnic food of Rajasthan

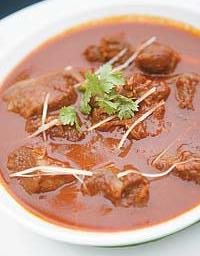
- Alternative names: Ratto Maas
- Type: Curry
- Course: Main course
- Place of origin: India
- Region or state: Rajasthan
- Serving temperature: Hot or warm
- Main ingredients: Mutton, curd, hot spices (red chillies), garlic

Laal maas (lit. "red meat") is a meat curry from Rajasthan, India. It was traditionally prepared by Rajput royalty during hunts. It is a mutton or game curry prepared in a sauce of yogurt and hot spices such as red Mathania chillies. This dish typically is very hot and rich in garlic. The gravy may be thick or liquid and is eaten with chapatis made out of wheat (usually eaten in summers) or bajra (a millet grown in Rajasthan and eaten in the winter months).

Chef Bulai Swain said that: "Traditionally, laal maans was made with wild game meat (jungli maans), such as boar or deer and chillies were used to veil the gamy odour of the meat. It was a favourite among the royalties. While the spicy flavour is remained intact now, the meat used is tender mutton."

== Etymology ==
"Laal" means red in Hindi, referring to the fiery red color of the dish, which comes from the vibrant spices like mathania chillies used in its preparation. "Maas" simply means meat in Hindi. So, "Laal Maas" literally translates to "Red Meat."

== See also ==
- Besan chakki
- Rajasthani cuisine
