= Bikaneri bhujia =

Indian snack food

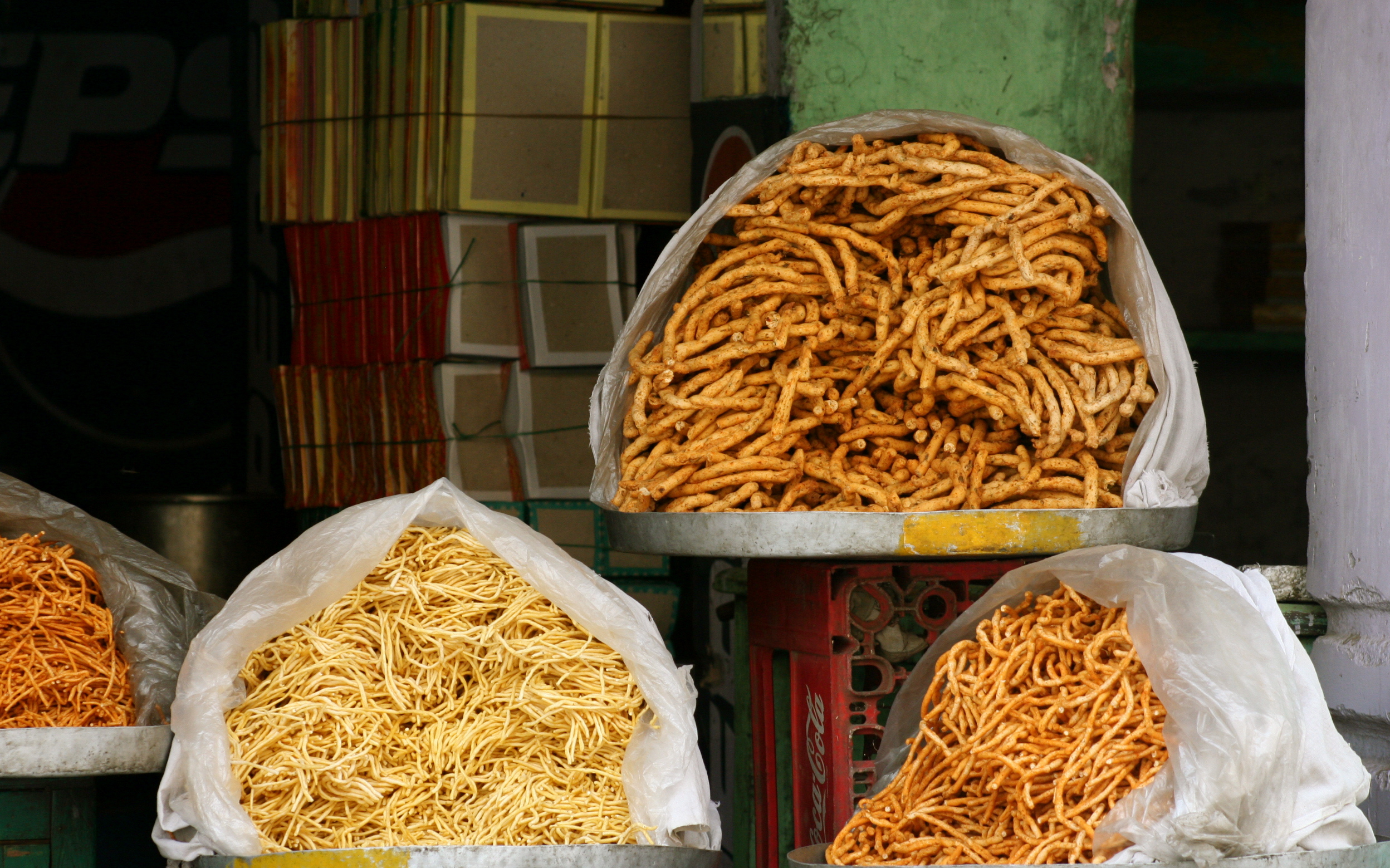
- Shop selling Bikaneri bhujia
- Alternative names: Bhujia
- Course: Snack
- Place of origin: India
- Region or state: Bikaner, Rajasthan
- Main ingredients: Vigna aconitifolia, gram flour, groundnut oil
- Variations: Sev

Bikaneri bhujia, often simply called bhujia, is a crispy snack prepared by using Vigna aconitifolia, gram flour and spices, originating from Bikaner, a city in the western state of Rajasthan in India. It is light yellow in colour and closely resembles sev in appearance, but is crunchier and more strongly flavoured.

Bhujia has become not just a characteristic product of Bikaner, but also a generic name.

Bikaneri bhujia is a cottage industry in Bikaner, Rajasthan, and provides employment to around 2.5 million people in villages of the region, especially women. Recently, it has faced competition from multinational companies like Pepsico as well as Indian snack companies, which have used the name bhujia. After struggling with numerous copycats over the years, in September 2010, the Indian Patent Office confirmed the geographical indication rights and a patent was issued for the brand name Bikaneri bhujia to local manufacturers of Bikaner.

== History ==
In 1877, during the reign of Maharaja Shri Dungar Singh, the first batch of bhujia was produced in the princely state of Bikaner.

== Preparation ==
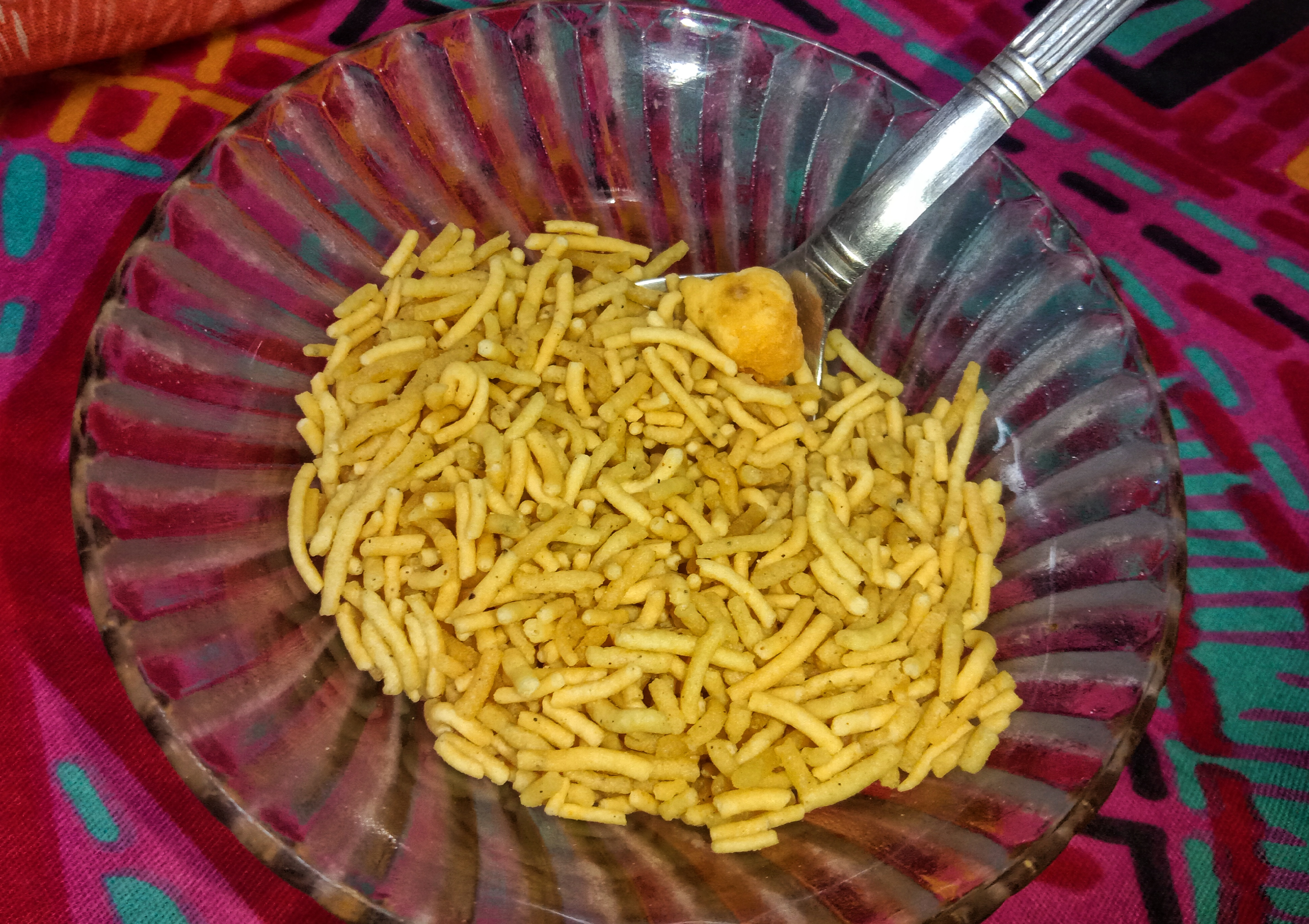
Bikaneri bhujia in West Bengal

A dough of moth bean, garbanzo bean, gram flour and spices including powdered cellulose, salt, red chilli, black pepper, cardamom, cloves, etc. is made into the snack by pressing it through a sieve and deep frying in vegetable oil.

== Geographical Indication protection ==
In October 2008, Bikaneri bhujia was granted Geographical Indication (GI) protection. A registered GI tag ensures only authorized users are allowed to use the product name.

== See also ==
- Rajasthani cuisine
- Sev
- Mysore pak
- Dharwad pedha
