= Mirchi bada =

Indian snack food

Mirchi Bada
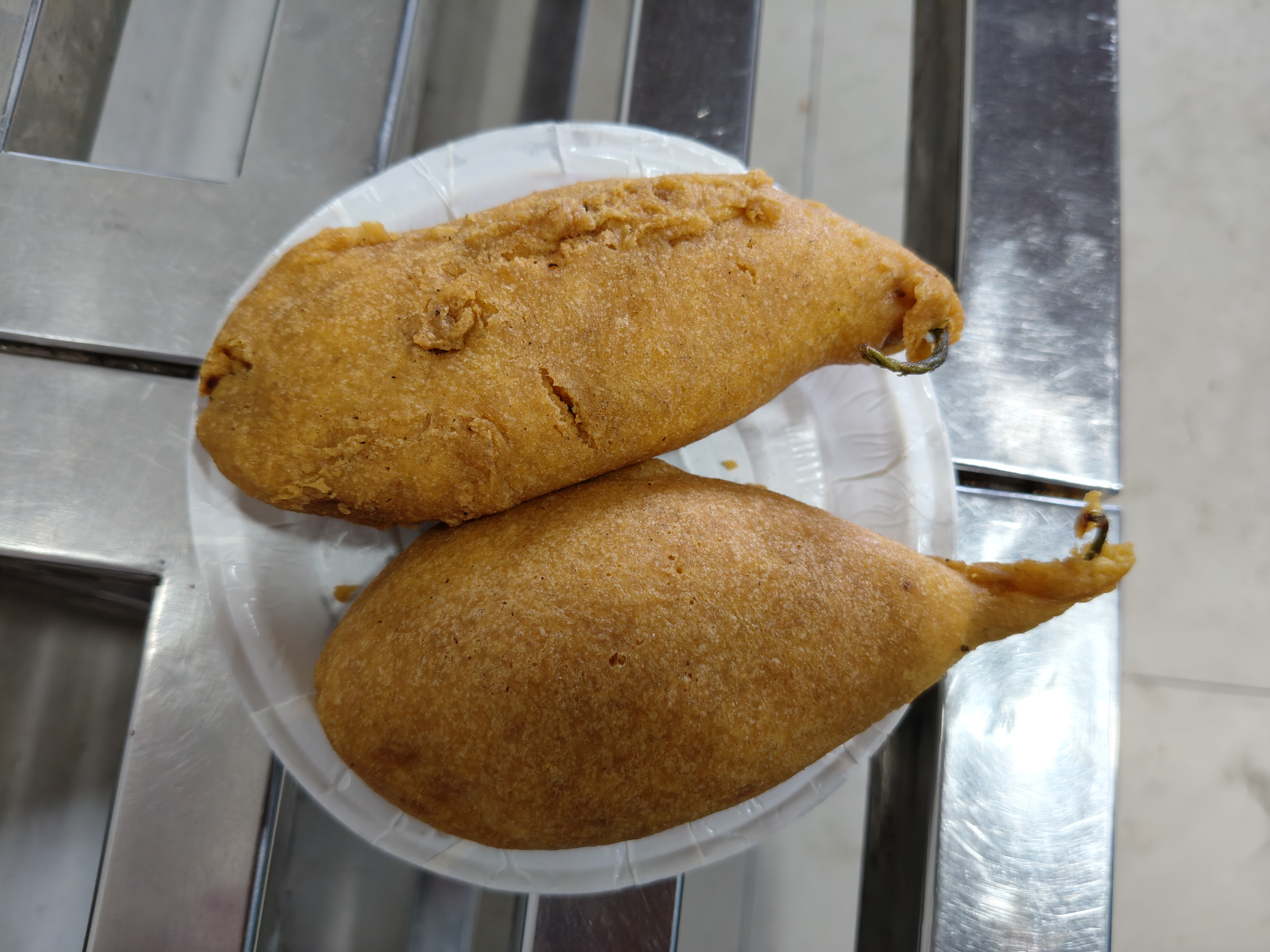
- Mirchi Bada
- Alternative names: Mirchi bhaje, Mirchi bhajia, Mirapakay bajji
- Course: Snack
- Place of origin: India
- Region or state: Jodhpur, Rajasthan
- Associated cuisine: Indian
- Serving temperature: Hot or warm
- Main ingredients: Green chillies, gram flour, potatoes

Mirchi Bada or Mirchi Vada is a vegetarian fast food dish native to Jodhpur in the Indian state of Rajasthan. The dish is made by stuffing a green chili with indian spices, mashed potato, and gram flour, then it is wrapped in besan batter and fried until golden brown. It is served hot and occasionally eaten with mint and tamarind chutney. Banana pepper and Bhavnagri chillies are used to make mirchi bada.

Mirchi badas are most consumed during the rainy season in India. In the southern part of India, Mirchi Bada is also referred to as Mirchi Bajji, with stuffing variations from place to place.

== Preparation ==
It is prepared by halving a mirchi (banana pepper), filling it with spices, a coating of mashed potatoes, and gram flour. Initially, the green chilli is fried alongside the potatoes and spices, and subsequently, it is deep-fried with a layer of gram flour coating. Then it is served hot with ketchup or chutneys.

== Variation ==
One variation of Mirchi bada is Mirapakay bajji from Telugu states.
