= Marwari Bhojnalaya =

Marwari Bhojnalaya is a popular name among Marwari-style purely vegetarian restaurants in many cities in India. They are all independently owned. The term "marwari" implies that it is intended for Marwari merchants, who are strictly vegetarian and prefer relatively simple (which can be eaten daily) and inexpensive food. They are however popular among all vegetarians. The term "bhojanalaya" practically always implies simple and inexpensive vegetarian cuisine. Restaurants named "Jain Bhojanalaya" or "Vaishanva Dhaba" are also vegetarian. Note that restaurants are often called "hotel" in India. Some of them used to offer traditional seating on wooden patiyas (mats for sitting) on the floor, but the custom is no longer popular and tables and chairs are now more common.

== Cuisine ==
In spite of the name, the food served is not necessarily Rajasthan style. For example, Dal-bati meals and dishes such as gatte ki kadhi (a type of curry using chick-pea dumplings) which are quite popular in Rajasthan, are often not served, or served only on special occasion. Rich and festive Rajasthani food can be found in special restaurants such as Chokhi-dhani chain. The food is generally served in stainless steel thalis (platters). Often onions are served only on request, because many Marwaris and Jains do not eat onions.

== See also ==
- Vaishnava
- List of vegetarian and vegan restaurants
- Vegetarianism in India
