= Kanda kachori =

Indian fried pastry

Pyaaz kachori
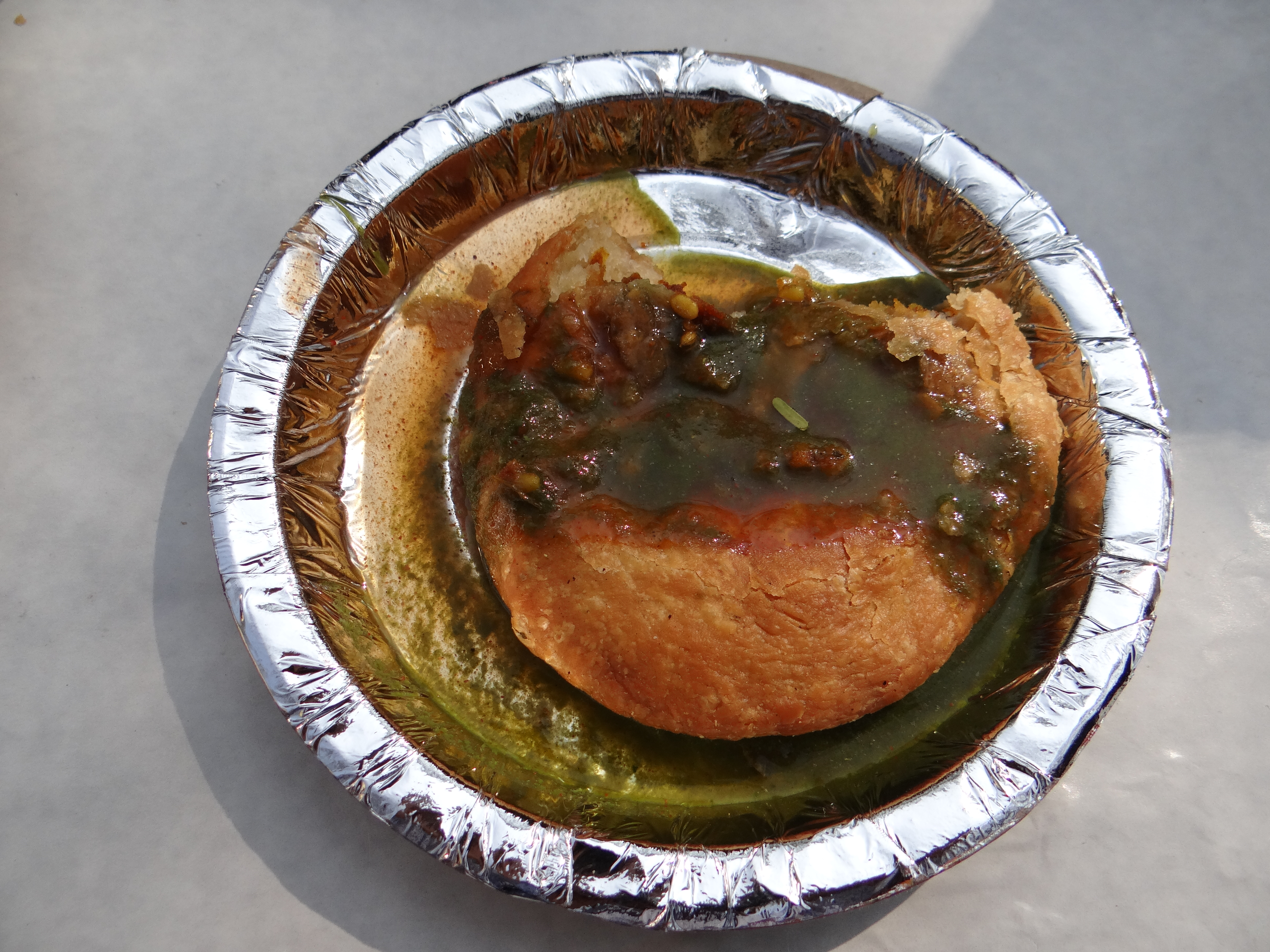
- Pyaaz kachori with mint and green chilli chutney
- Alternative names: Kaanda kachori
- Course: Snack
- Place of origin: India
- Region or state: Jodhpur, Rajasthan
- Associated cuisine: Indian
- Serving temperature: Hot or warm
- Main ingredients: Maida (flour), onions, besan, ghee

Kanda kachori or pyaaz kachori (transl. 'onion kachori') is an Indian crispy, flaky, deep-fried pastry filled with spiced onion stuffing. It is typically served hot with a sweet and spicy tamarind chutney. Originating in the city of Jodhpur, it is now served throughout Rajasthan and the rest of India.

== Origin ==
Pyaaz kachori originated in Rajasthan, particularly in Jodhpur.

== Preparation ==
The kachoris are made by first preparing a dough with maida, salt, and ghee, which is then kneaded and left to rest. For the onion filling, onions are sautéed with nigella seeds, fennel seeds, bay leaves, green chillies, and spices, and then mixed with besan. The filling is then stuffed into small circles of the dough, which are deep-fried in oil until crisp and golden brown.

== Gallery ==
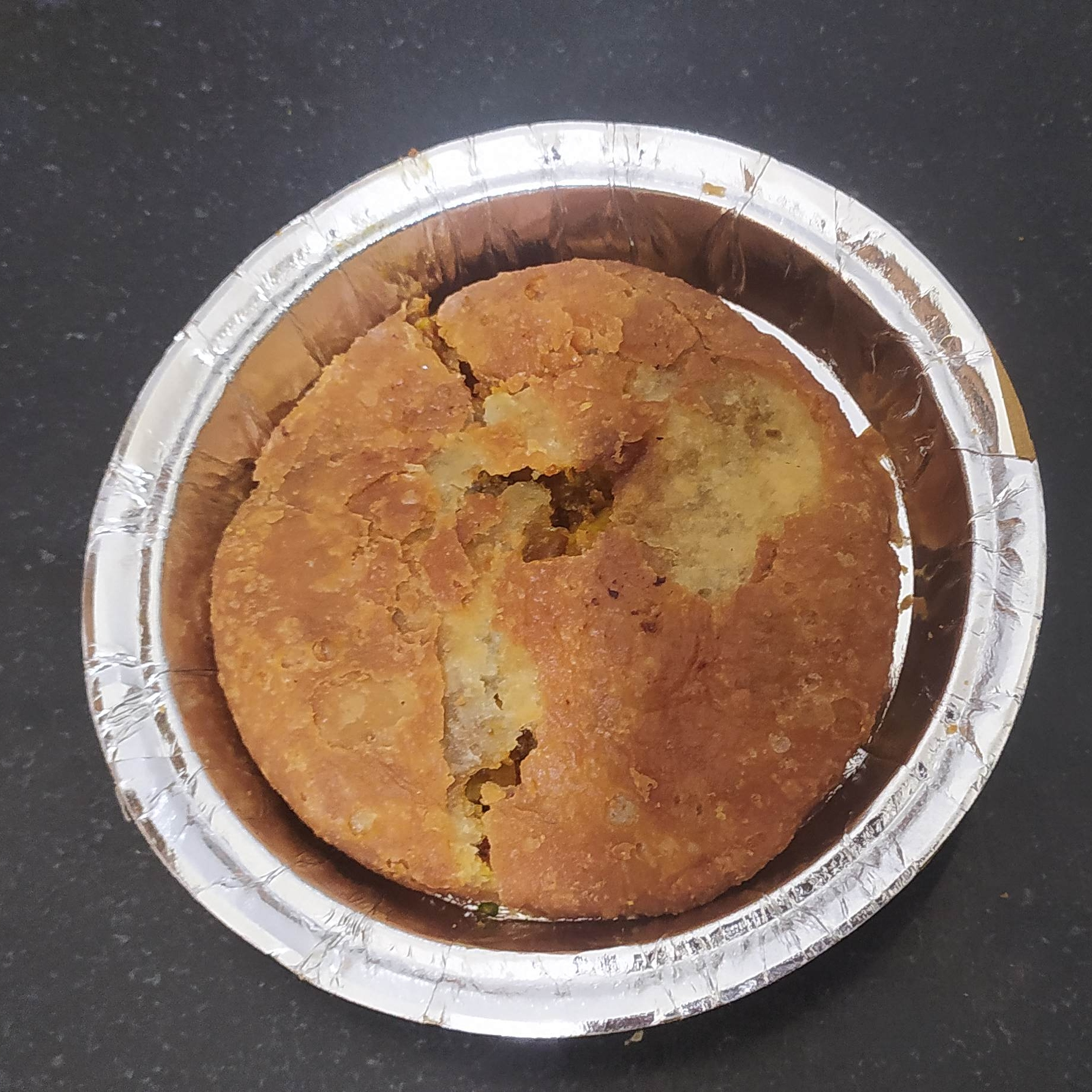
Pyaaz kachori

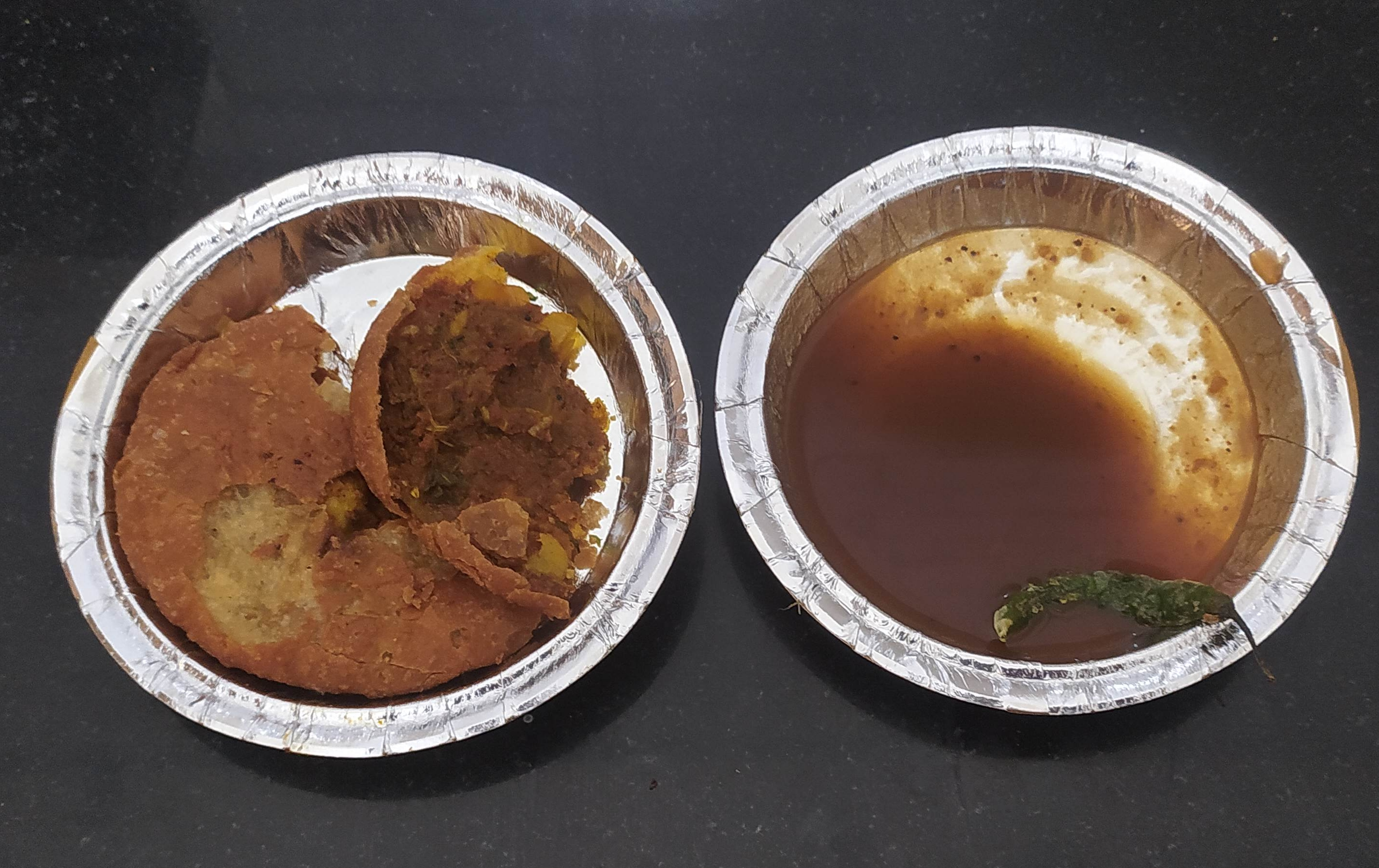
Pyaaz kachori with tamarind chutney

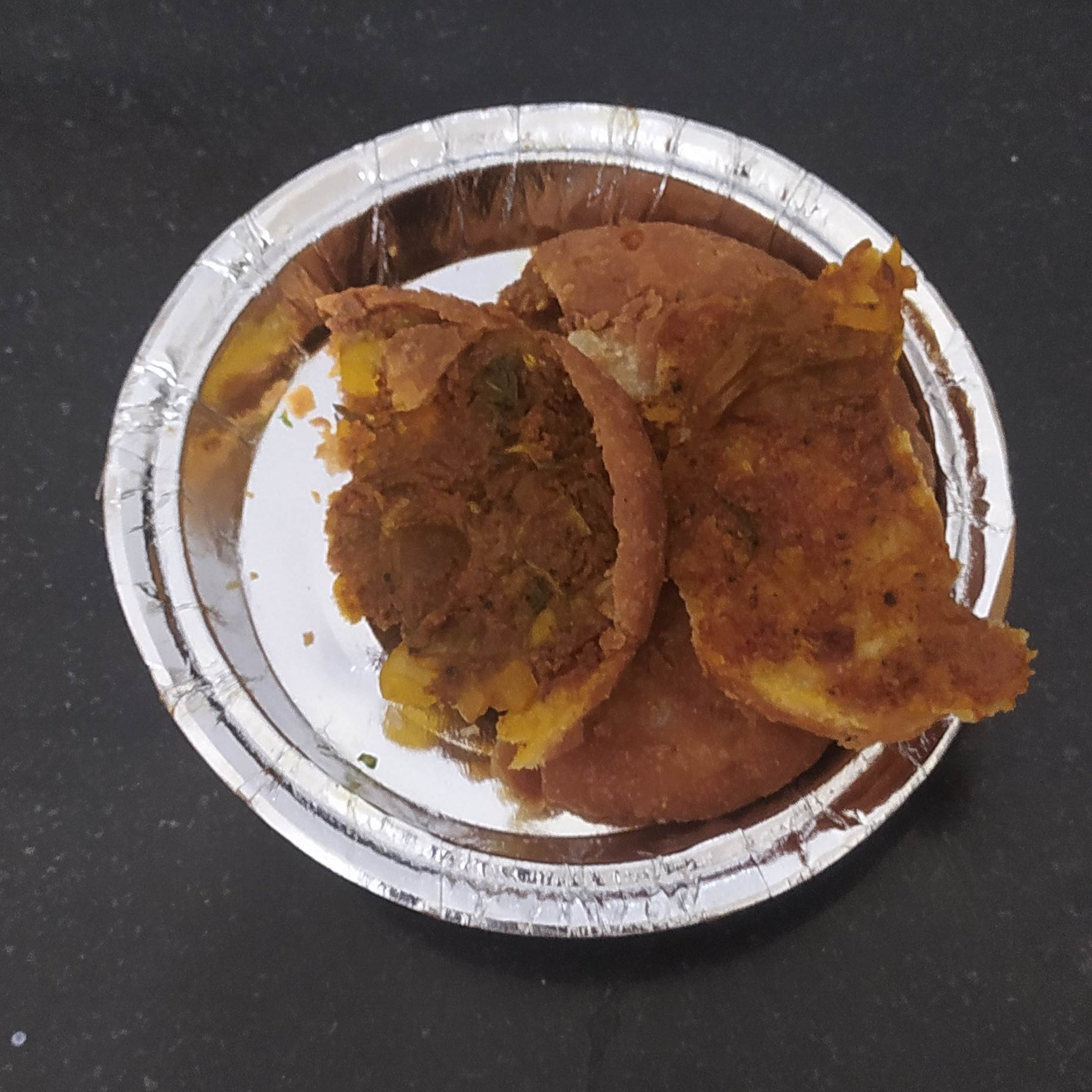
Spiced onions filling of pyaaz kachori

== See also ==
- Kachori
- Rajasthani cuisine
