= Asian cuisine =

Culinary traditions of Asia

Location of Asia

Asian cuisine encompasses several significant regional cooking styles of Asia: East Asian, Southeast Asian, South Asian, Central Asian, West Asian, and North Asian. Cuisine is a distinctive way of cooking practices and customs, usually associated with a specific culture. Asia, as the largest and most populous continent, is home to many cultures, each with its own characteristic cuisine. Asian cuisine, also known as Eastern cuisine, is considered the "culture of food within a society" due to the beliefs, cooking methods, and the specific ingredients used throughout the entire process. Asian cuisines are also renowned for their spices. A key taste factor in Asian cuisine is “umami” flavor, a strong savoriness prominent in Asian cooking, which can be achieved through fermented food or meat extract.

Ingredients common to many cultures in East and Southeast Asia include rice, ginger, garlic, sesame seeds, chilis, dried onions, soy, and tofu. Stir frying, steaming, and deep frying are common cooking methods.

While rice is common to most Asian cuisines, different varieties are popular in the various regions. Glutinous rice is ingrained in the culture, religious tradition and national identity of Laos. Basmati rice is popular in the Indian subcontinent, jasmine rice is often found across Southeast Asia, while long-grain rice is popular in China and short-grain in Japan and Korea.

Curry is a common dish in South Asia, Southeast Asia, and East Asia. Curry dishes have their origins in the Indian subcontinent. Countries in Indochina typically use a coconut milk base in their curries; countries in West Asia typically use a yogurt base.

== Historical timeline ==
A heavily influential aspect of Asian culture is the food, especially the various traditional ways of Asian cuisine and cooking. Although many Asian cultures often share the traditions of bringing the family or group together to socialize or have celebrations over a meal, the various cultures of Asia each developed their own individual ethnic cultural takes on food through the interaction of history, culture, and environment. Asian cuisine is often associated with multiculturalism with specific foods linked to many different cultures.

== East Asian cuisine ==
Location of East Asia.

East Asian cuisine includes Chinese, Hong Kong, Japanese, Korean, Macanese, Mongolian, Taiwanese, and Tibetan food. Considering this is the most populated region of the world, it has many regional cuisines (especially in China). Examples of staple foods include rice, noodles, mung beans, soybeans, seafood (Japan has the highest per capita consumption of seafood), mutton (Mongolia), bok choy (Chinese cabbage), and tea.

== Southeast Asian cuisine ==
Location of Southeast Asia.

Southeast Asian cuisine includes a strong emphasis on lightly prepared dishes with a strong aromatic component that features such flavors as citrus and herbs such as lime, coriander/cilantro and basil. Ingredients in the region contrast with the ones in the East Asian cuisines, substituting fish sauces for sauce and the inclusion of ingredients such as galangal, tamarind and lemongrass. Cooking methods include a balance of stir-frying, boiling and steaming.

== South Asian cuisine ==
Location of South Asia.

South Asian cuisine includes cuisines from the Indian subcontinent and the rest of South Asia. Food items in this region are generally rich in spices, however it also caters a blend of multi-cuisine culture from all across the world. Food is flavored with various types of chili, black pepper, cloves, condiments and other herbs and spices, flavored butters and ghee.

The multitude is inclined more towards the usage of mustard, groundnut, sunflower and soybean oil for cooking. Usage of refined oil to make puri is quite famous. Puri bhaji, idli, dosa, dal baati, and litti are among the most popular and representative dishes of Indian cuisines.

Vegetables are generally eaten with a type of bread called chapati, which is the staple food of the region. Rice is generally taken with dal to moisten it in northern India, or with curd in southern India.

Tea and coffee are prominent all across with the former available at every street corner. Egg dishes are also available in similar fashion.

Common meats include lamb, goat, fish, and chicken. As cattle are considered sacred in Hinduism, beef is less common than in Western cuisines. Prohibitions against beef extend to the meat of cows, and yaks to some extent. Pork is considered a haram by all Muslims, and is avoided by some Hindus. Other minorities also prohibit the use of meat to abjure violence. Fish is commonly used in South India, Sri Lanka and the Bengal region, i.e. Bangladesh and the West Bengal state of India. The Northern region diet mostly consists of wheat and other major crops.

== Central Asian cuisine ==
Location of Central Asia.

Most Central Asian nations have similar cuisines to each other as well as their neighbors, taking many features of the neighboring cuisines of West and East Asia, particularly Iran and Mongolia. A dish known as "plov", or "osh", for example, is a widespread variation of pilaf. However, many of the same countries use horse meat and mutton as the most common meats, similar to beef. This is owing to Mongolian cuisine. In Kazakhstan and Kyrgyzstan, the cuisine has evolved to meet the needs of a nomad lifestyle.

Kumis is a widespread drink among Turkic peoples, especially in Central Asia.

Central Asia is also noted for being the birthplace of yogurt. Like kumis, it is widespread among Turkic peoples.

== West Asian cuisine ==
Location of West Asia.

West Asian cuisine is the cuisine of the various countries and peoples of West Asia. The cuisine of the region is diverse while having a degree of homogeneity. Some commonly used ingredients include olives and olive oil, pitas, honey, sesame seeds, dates, sumac, chickpeas, mint and parsley. Some popular dishes include kibbeh and shawarma.

Cereals constitute the basis of West Asian diet, both historically and today. Wheat and rice are the major and preferred sources of staple foods. Barley is also widely used in the region and maize has become common in some areas as well. Bread is a universal staple, eaten in one form or another by all classes and groups practically at every meal.

Butter and clarified butter (also known as Semna) are, traditionally, the preferred medium of cooking. Olive oil is prevalent in the Mediterranean coastal areas. Christians use it during Lent, when meat and dairy products are excluded, and Jews use it in place of animal fats such as butter to avoid mixing meat and dairy products.

Lamb and mutton have always been the favored meats of West Asia. Pork is prohibited in both Islam and Judaism, and as such is rarely eaten in the region. Prominent among the meat preparations are grilled meats, or kebabs. Meat and vegetable stews, served with rice, bulgur, or bread, are another form of meat preparation in the region.

Vegetables and pulses are the predominant staples of the great majority of the people in the West Asia. They are boiled, stewed, grilled, stuffed, and cooked with meat and rice. Among the green leafy vegetables, many varieties of cabbage, spinach, and chard are widely used. Root and bulb vegetables, such as onions and garlic, as well as carrots, turnips, and beets are equally common.

== North Asian cuisine ==
Location of North Asia.

North Asian cuisine is often synonymous with Russian cuisine, due to all of North Asia being a part of the Russian Federation. However, some cultures or areas of Siberia have in-depth cuisine, such as the Yakuts (or Sakha) and Yamal cuisine. Buryats also have their own cuisine, although it is very similar to that of the related Mongolians.

Pelmeni, originally a Permic or Ugric dish, has entered into mainstream Russian cuisine as a well-known dish, but it can still be considered part of the Yamal cuisine for its area of origin. Some speculate them to be a simplified version of the Chinese wonton. In Siberia, pelmeni is frozen outdoors to preserve the meat inside throughout the long winter. In Yamal, other types of drying and preservation are common. Key ingredients in most northern Siberian cuisine include fish and cowberries, sometimes known as lingonberries in Europe and North America. Yakuts, like many other Turkic-speaking peoples, traditionally enjoy kumis as a common drink.

== See also ==
- List of Asian cuisines
