= Bati (bread) =

Type of bread popular in western India

Baati
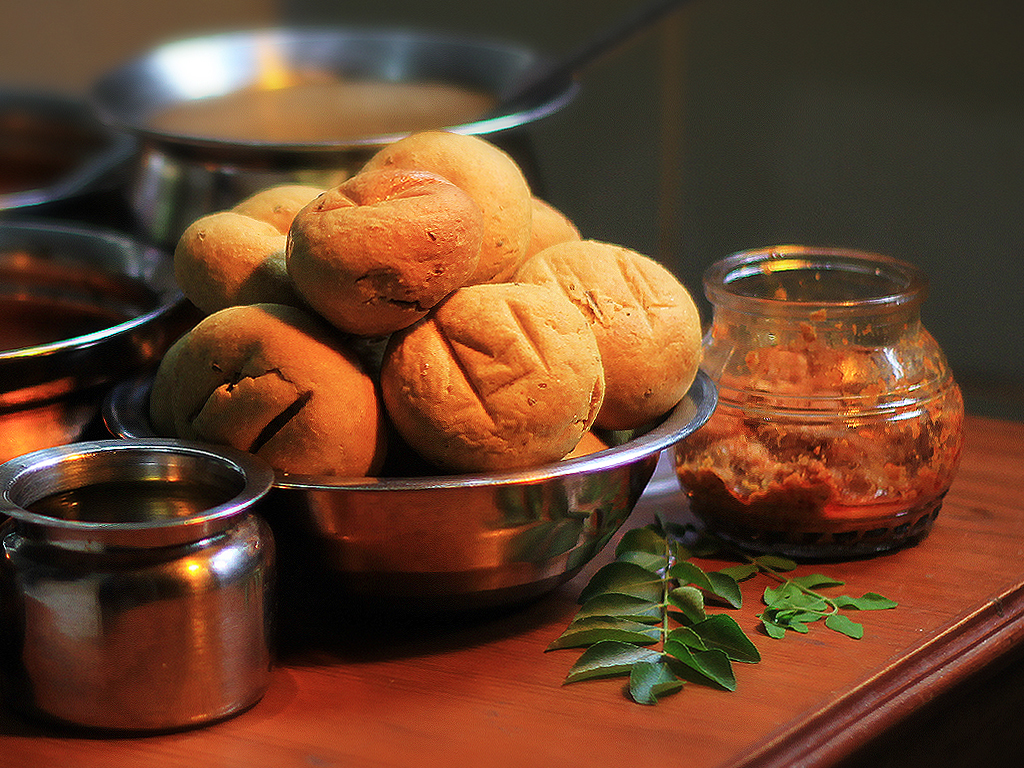
- Baati
- Type: Bread
- Place of origin: Rajasthan, India
- Region or state: Rajasthan, Malwa & Nimar (Madhya Pradesh),
- Main ingredients: Ghee, clarified butter, Flour, Water
- Variations: Litti (cuisine) , Baaphla

Baati is a hard, unleavened bread cooked in most areas of Rajasthan, and in Malwa & Nimar Region of Madhya Pradesh and Gujarat states of India. It is prized for its long shelf life and high nutritional content, and, in desert areas, for the minimal quantity of water required for its preparation. Baati is commonly eaten with dal, hence also referred to as dal baati. In some regions, especially Madhya Pradesh, it is also paired with a roasted aubergine mash called bharta. Baati is also closely related to Baaphla of Malwa and Nimar Region of Madhya Pradesh and Litti (cuisine) of eastern Uttar Pradesh (Varanasi) and western Bihar and is eaten with potato, tomato and roasted aubergine.

Baati can either be plain or have various kinds of fillings, including onions, peas, and sattu. Baphla is a kind of baati, which is softer and popular in Malwa-Nimar Region of Madhya Pradesh. Baphla and baati are mostly eaten with hot dal with pure ghee and chutney.

Churma is a popular delicacy usually served with baatis and dal. It is coarsely ground wheat crushed and cooked with ghee and sugar. Traditionally it is made by mashing up wheat flour baatis or leftover rotis in ghee and jaggery, optionally mixed with dry fruits and flavours. It can be eaten alone or with dal.

== Daal-baati-churma ==
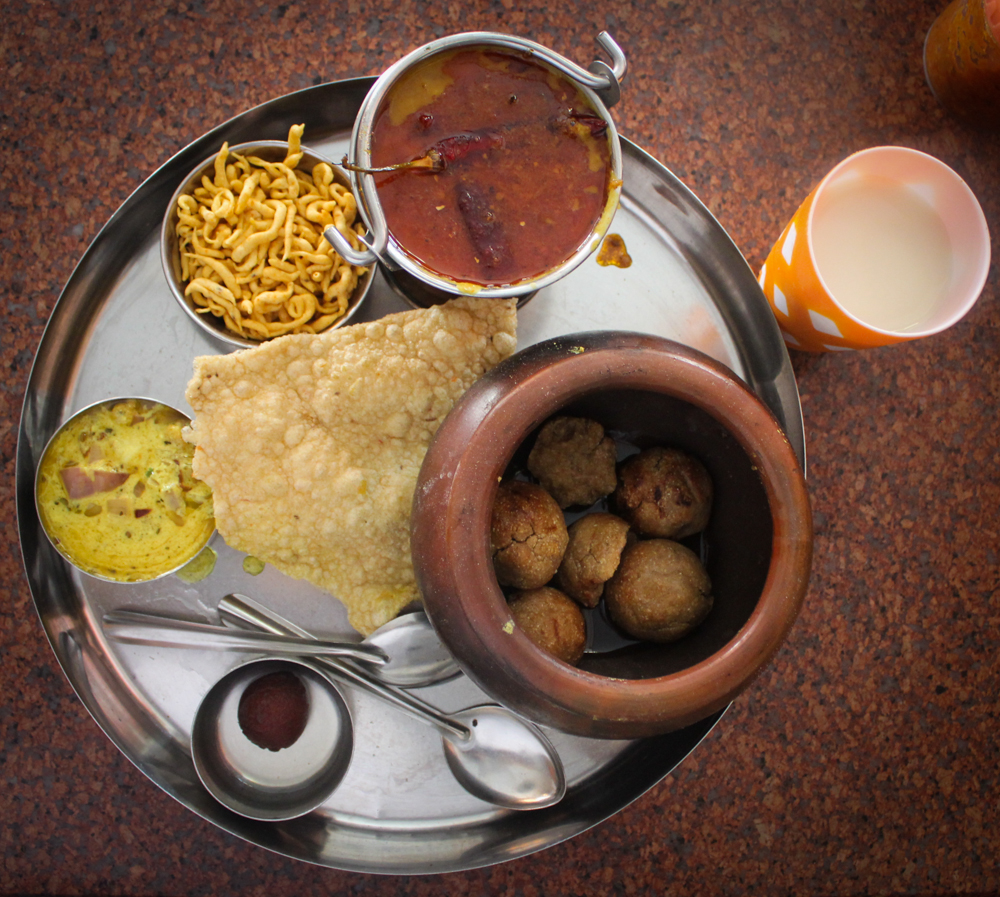
Dal Baati

Dal-baati-churma is a popular pairing of three dishes and a complete meal. Dal Baati is a popular Rajasthani dish consisting of mainly Uradh Dal (combination of five lentils) and Baati i.e. small wheat bread balls. Baati is dipped in pure ghee and served hot in a traditional earthen pot. Dal is served in a small bucket-shaped vessel with a red chilli tadka on top, spicy garlic chutney, or with besan (gram flour).

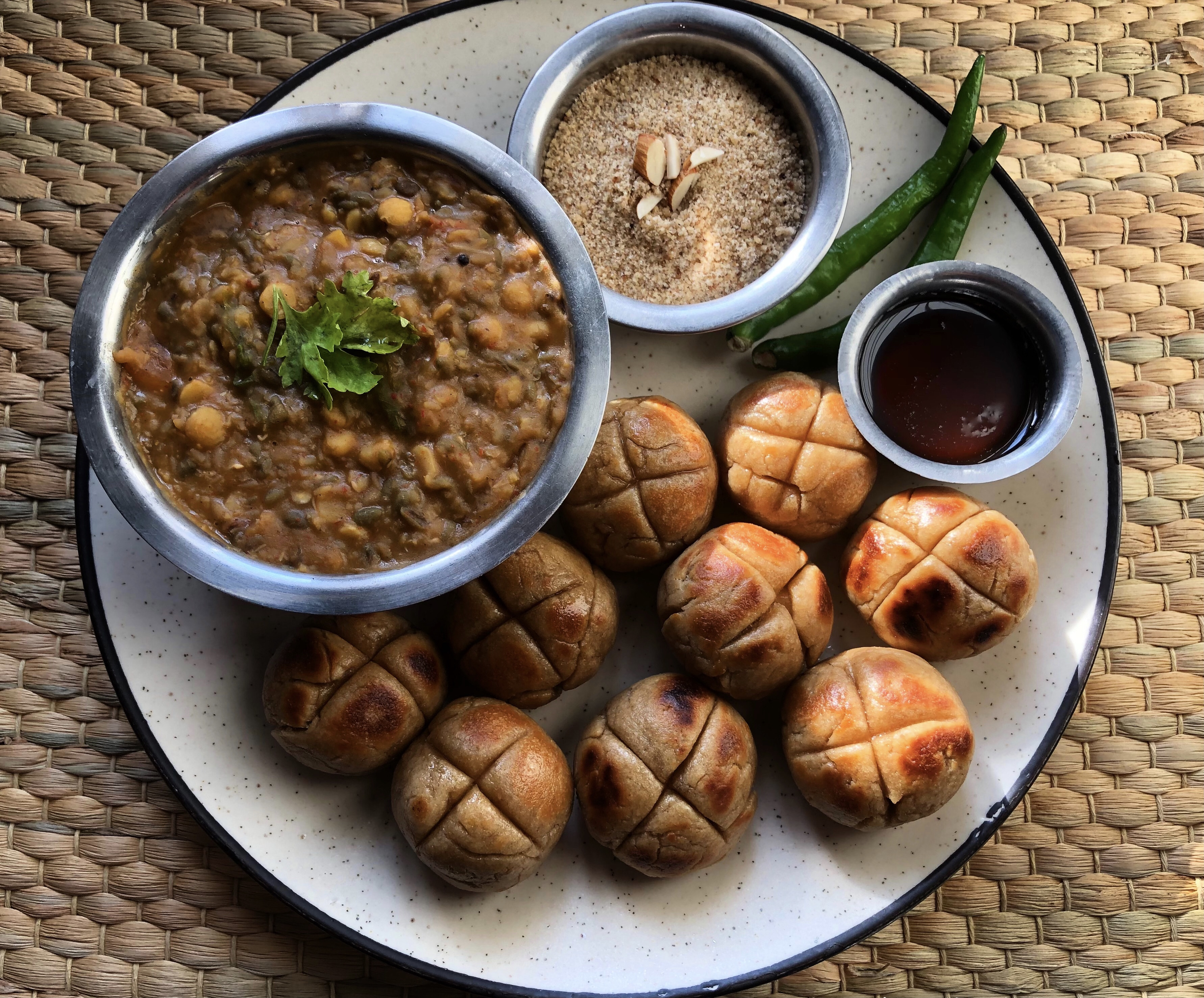
Dal, baati, and churma on a platter

It is traditionally prepared by coarsely mashing baati and pouring ghee on top of it. It is commonly served at all festivities, including religious occasions, wedding ceremonies, and birthday parties in Rajasthan.

== Daal-Baati Thali ==
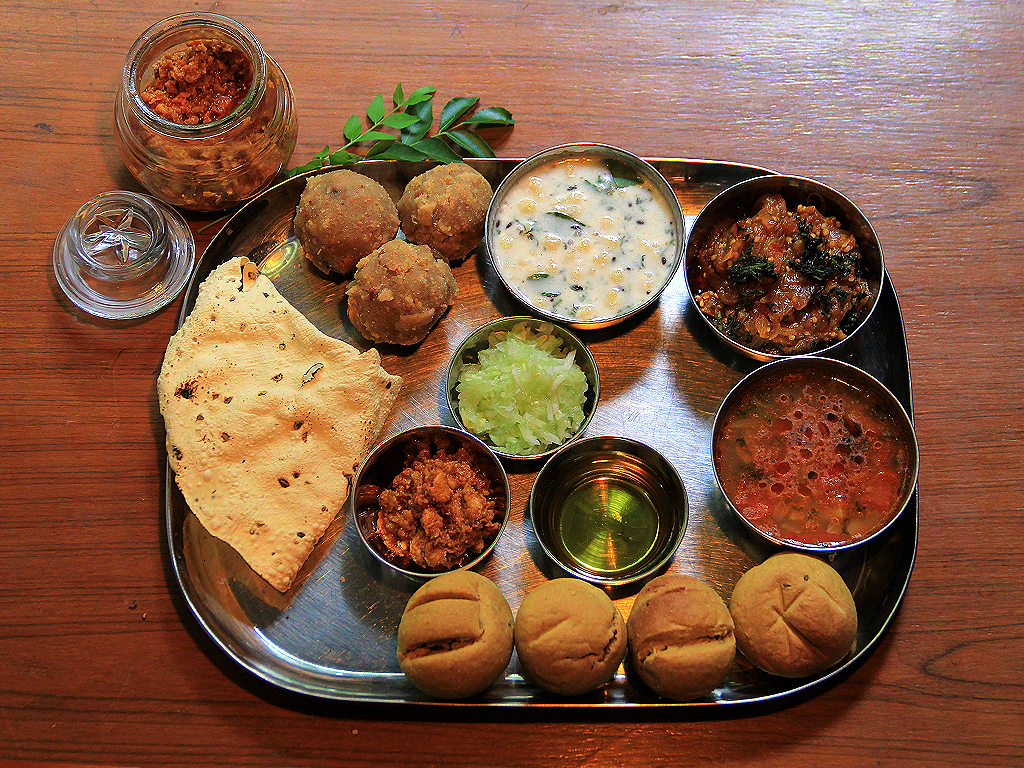
Daal Baati Thaali

Rajasthani thali is incomplete without baati. Baati is also served with besan gatte, boondi raita. Garlic chutney, papad, kadhi and mango pickle.

In Madhya Pradesh, Daal-Baati is served with other dishes as well, for example, Baingan ka Bharta (aubergine cooked on direct flames and mashed with raw spices) or fried potatoes. Kadhi (cooked with Besan (gram flour) and butter milk) is also eaten with Daal-Baati as it adds a liquid element and maintains the water content in the whole combination.

Gatte ki Sabzi, made up of Besan (gram flour) and spices, is also eaten in western Madhya Pradesh and Rajasthan. It is a little bit spicier, adding a spicy element to the whole thali.

Mango Pickle and Green Chutney (made with coriander, lemon, tomatoes, rock salt, cumin seeds and sea salt) are integral parts of the thali. In western Madhya Pradesh towards Malwa, sweet rice is also cooked and served in the Thali. The rice is cooked with saffron, sugar and cloves.

== See also ==
- List of Indian breads
