= Churma =

Indian dish

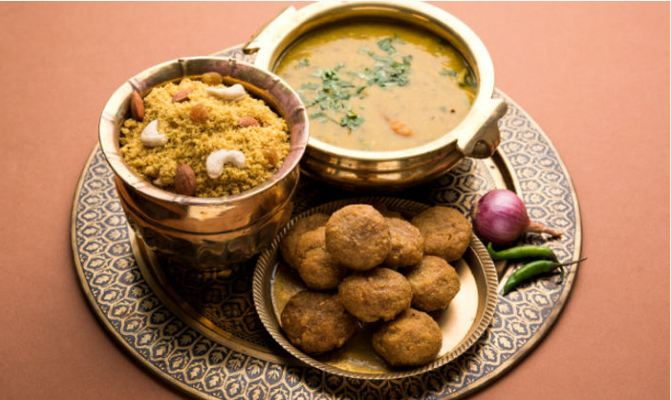
- Dal bati churma
- Place of origin: India
- Region or state: Punjab Bihar, Awadh, Uttar Pradesh, Rajasthan, Gujarat, Haryana
- Main ingredients: Bajri/wheat, ghee, jaggery

Churma is a popular Rajasthani, Bihari, Uttar Pradeshi, Haryanvi, and Awadhi delicacy from India. In Punjab, the dish is called churi. It is coarsely ground wheat, crushed and cooked with ghee and sugar.

In Haryana, churma is made by mashing up roti in ghee and jaggery. It is also sometimes served without ghee, especially as a diet for the wrestlers sparring in the dangal of akharas. It is usually served either with a tall glass of warm milk, lassi, or with sour kadhi.

In Rajasthan, churma is made in lots of variations. It is made by mashing up roti made of either bajra (see pearl millet) or gehu (see wheat) with Desi ghee and sugar ( shakkar / khand / bura / kasar ) or jaggery pieces. It is commonly eaten with kadhi, dal and topped with ghee. 'Dade ka Churma' often called 'Rajasthani Churma', is a special kind of churma that is native to Rajasthan. It is made by sifting wheat flour, suji (see semolina ) and besan (see gram flour). They are kneaded into a dough adding melted ghee and milk. Small 'lois' (dough balls) are made, and fried till golden brown. After the lois cool down, they are ground to a coarse powdery texture. Following this, powdered sugar, cardamom and dry fruits are mixed in. It is a popular companion to the dish dal bati and is eaten often at social events/celebrations and served with dal.

== See also ==
- Dal bati churma
- Katt Bafla
