= Litti (dish) =

East Indian dish

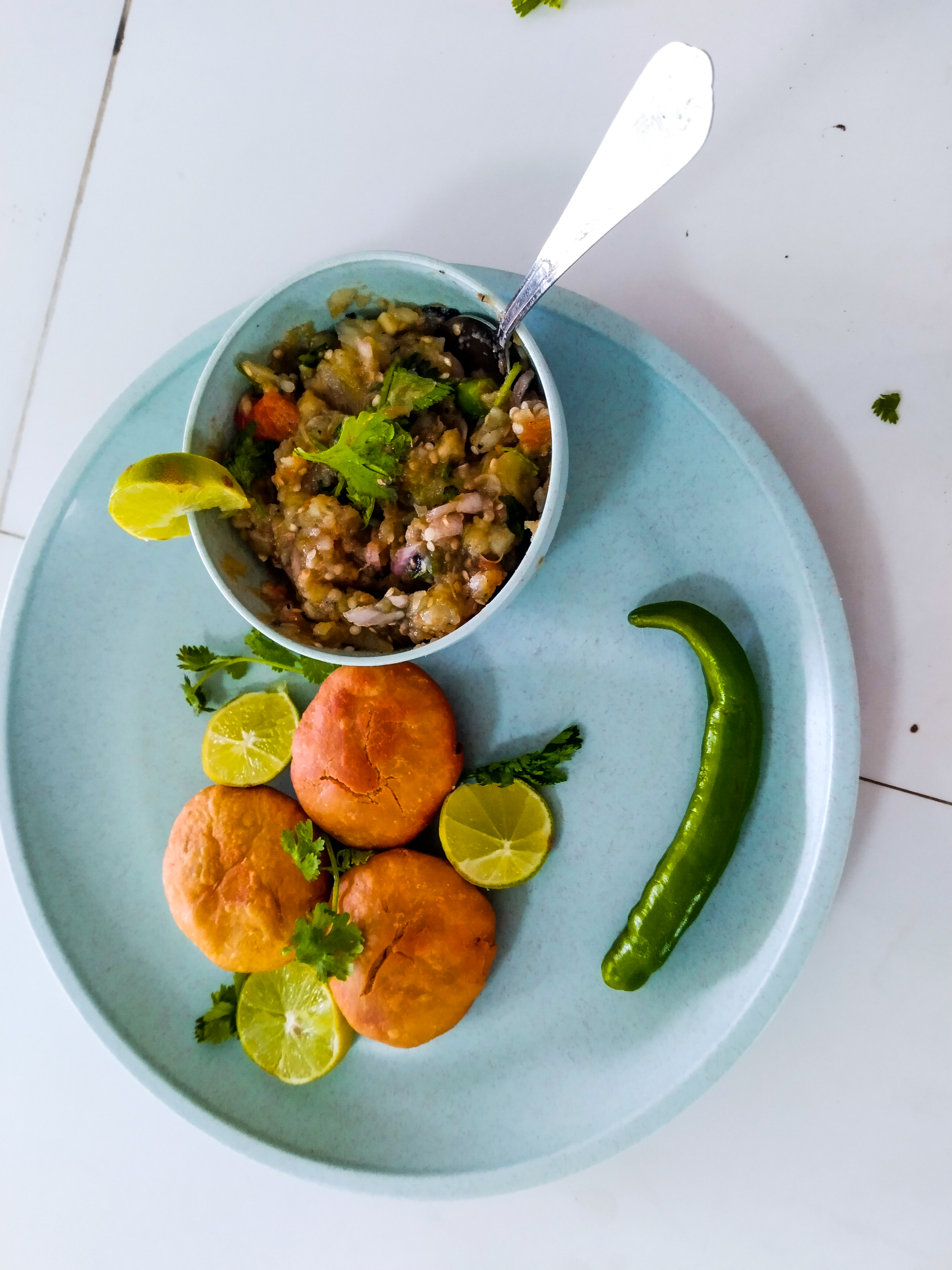
- Chokha surrounded by ghee-dipped litti
- Alternative names: Baati, Bhauri
- Course: Snack, main course
- Place of origin: India and Nepal
- Region or state: Bhojpuri region
- Associated cuisine: Bhojpuri cuisine
- Serving temperature: Any
- Main ingredients: Wheat flour, brinjal, onion, peppers, cilantro, mustard oil, gram flour, ghee
- Variations: Baati

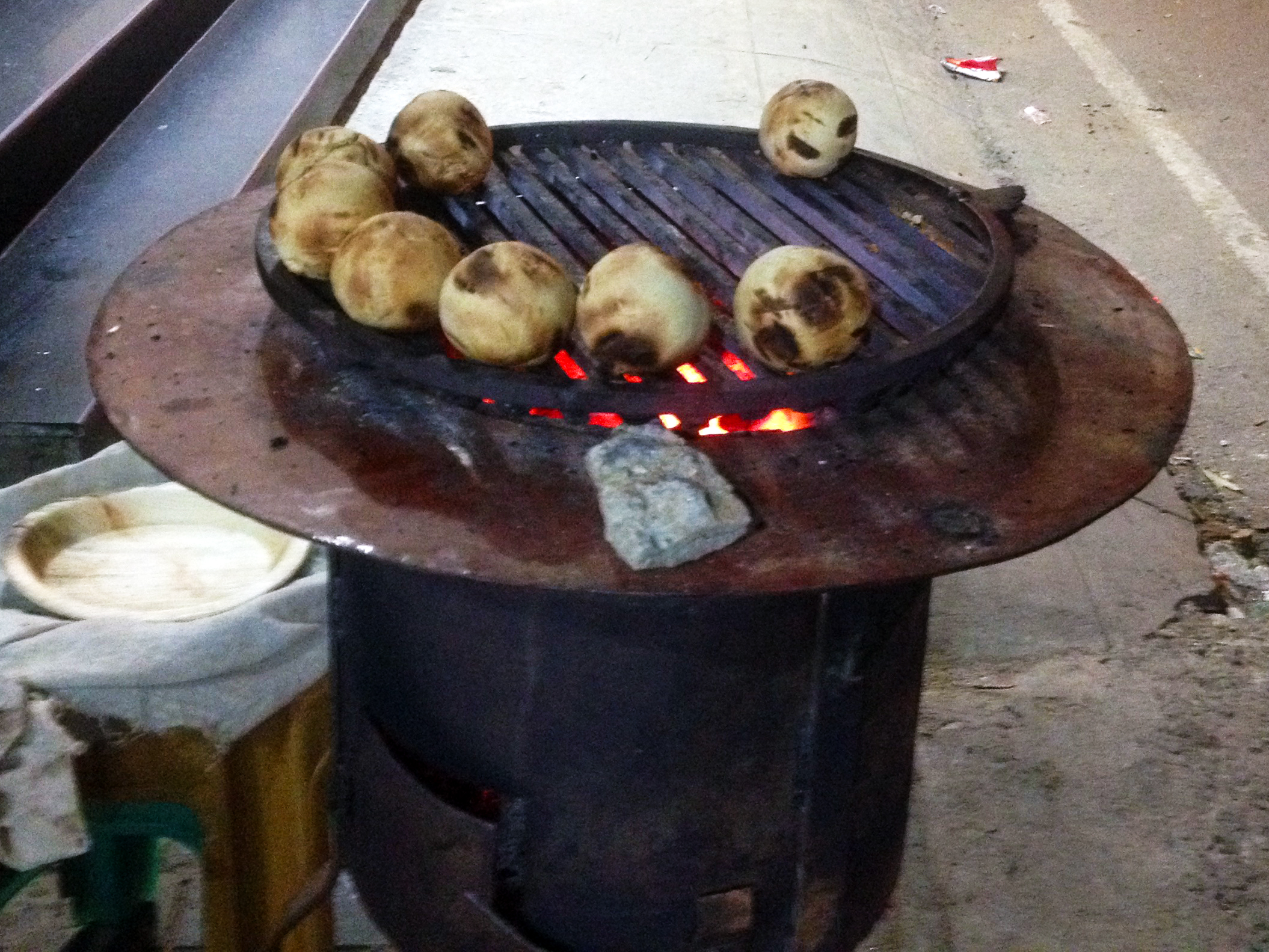
Litti preparation in barbeque style in Bengaluru, India.

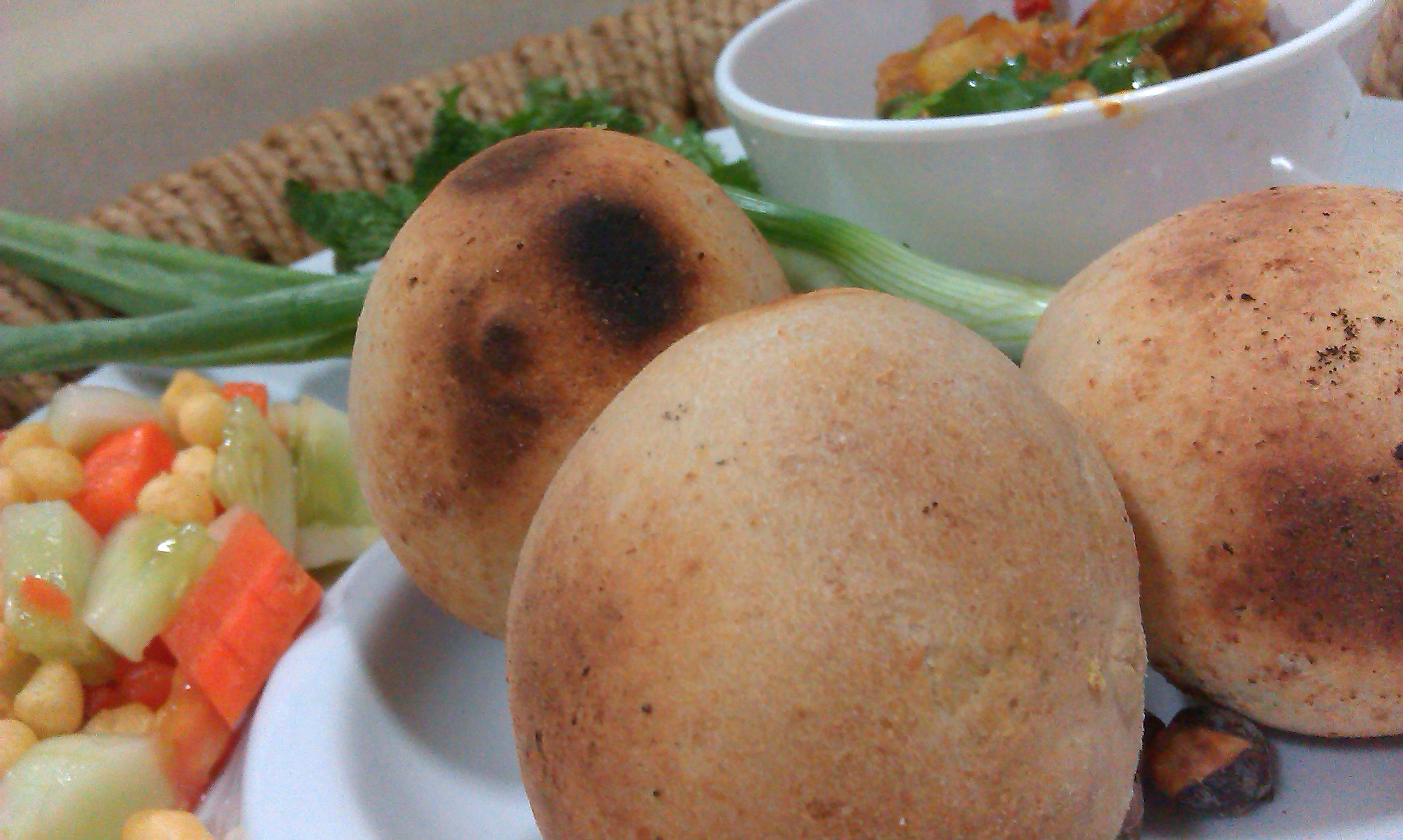
Litti chokha

Litti (Bhojpuri: 𑂪𑂲𑂗𑂲 romanized: leetee) is a wholewheat flour dough ball stuffed with a spiced mixture of satui (roasted black chickpea flour). Litti, along with chokha, is a complete meal that is popular in the Indian states of Bihar especially western Bihar, and eastern Uttar Pradesh, and the Nepalese provinces of Madhesh and Lumbini (eastern parts). It is also a popular street food in small towns and cities. Over the years it has gained international recognition.

It consists of a wheat dough ball filled with a mixture of roasted gram flour, Lemon, spices, and herbs, which is then roasted on hot charcoal or dried cow dung fire. They can also be baked in an oven, roasted on a tava or fried.

== Historical background ==
The history of Litti is deeply rooted in the Bhojpuri region of the Indian subcontinent, particularly in the cities of Buxar and Banaras. Both the Panchkosi Jatra and the Lota-Bhanta Mela are significant cultural and religious events in these regions, highlighting the ritualistic importance of Litti.

The Panchkosi Jatra, an annual pilgrimage held in Buxar, involves the circumambulation of five sacred sites. It starts every year on the fifth day of the dark fortnight of Agrahayana and lasts for five days. According to a legend from the Ramayana, Lord Ram consumed Litti-Chokha during his visit to Charitravan in Buxar while staying at the ashram of Maharishi Vishwamitra. As part of the Panchkosi Jatra, Litti is prepared and offered to Lord Ram as prasad at Charitravan on the final day of the journey, symbolizing devotion and preserving the dish’s ritualistic significance in the area's long-standing traditions.

The Lota-Bhanta Mela, held annually in Varanasi, on the sixth day of the dark fortnight of Agrahayana is another major festival linked to Litti (also called Baati). According to legend, Lord Ram is believed to have visited Kashi twice, performing the sacred Panchkosi Jatra—first to absolve King Dasharatha of a curse and later to atone for Brahmahatya after slaying Ravana. During his second pilgrimage, Lord Ram made a Shivling from sand, performed jalabhishek, and then prepared Litti-Chokha, offering it to Lord Shiva as bhog and later consuming it as prasad, completing his penance. This site is now known as Rameshwar Mahadev. As part of the Lota-Bhanta Mela, devotees bathe in the Varuna River, prepare Litti-Chokha, and offer it to Lord Shiva, continuing this sacred tradition of devotion.

The dish has its roots in the cuisine of Bihar, Jharkhand, eastern Uttar Pradesh, and southern Nepal. It has been a part of local diets for centuries, often associated with the peasant and working-class populations. It is also said to have been a staple food for the armies of Magadh due to its long shelf life and nutritional value.

== Description ==
Litti is a dough ball made from whole wheat flour, stuffed with sattu (roasted gram flour) mixed with garlic, ginger, onions, coriander leaves, lime juice, carom seeds, nigella seeds, and mustard oil. Traditionally, it is cooked over a coal fire, giving it a distinct smoky flavour.

Chokha is prepared by mashing boiled vegetables, typically eggplant, tomatoes, and potatoes, mixed with garlic, green chilies, mustard oil, and various spices to enhance the flavour.

=== Ingredients ===
- Litti: Whole wheat flour, sattu (roasted gram flour), spices (garlic, ginger, carom seeds, nigella seeds), mustard oil and lime juice.
- Chokha: Eggplant, potatoes, tomatoes, green chilies, garlic, mustard oil, salt, and cilantro.

=== Preparation ===
Traditionally Litti Chokha is essentially two items Litti and Chokha, often served with accompaniments like pickle, salad, or green peppers.

- Litti: Whole wheat dough balls stuffed with a savory mixture of sattu (roasted chickpea flour), herbs, and spices. These are traditionally roasted over charcoal or cow dung fire for a smoky flavour, but can also be baked or pan-fried.
- Chokha: A mashed vegetable relish made with roasted or grilled eggplant, tomato, and potato. It is often seasoned with onions, garlic, ginger, chilies, and spices. It is also called Baigan ka bharta.

Litti is prepared by making dough balls from the wheat flour, which are then filled with the spiced sattu mixture. The balls are then baked until they turn golden brown. Chokha involves roasting or boiling the vegetables, which are then peeled and mashed with the rest of the spices and seasonings. Street vendors prepare Litti in a barbeque style.

== Flavors and variations ==
Herbs and spices used to flavour the litti include onion, garlic, ginger, coriander leaves, lime juice, carom seeds, nigella seeds and salt. In Madhesh Province of Nepal, Litti is served with Momo Achar. In western Bihar and eastern Uttar Pradesh, litti is served with murgh korma (a creamy chicken curry) or chokha (a vegetable preparation of roasted and mashed eggplant, tomato, and potato).

== Popularity ==
Litti-chokha was selected to represent the country under the banner of the National Association of Street food Vendors of India (NASVI) at the five-day event in the Philippines capital, Manila.

== See also ==
- Bhojpuri cuisine
- Nepalese cuisine
- Dal bati churma
- Bihari culture
- Fuchka
