= Dal bati =

Indian dish of lentils and unleavened bread

Daal bati (also spelled daal baati) is an Indian dish of dal (lentils) and bati (hard wheat rolls). It is popular in Rajasthan, Madhya Pradesh (especially in Braj, Nimar and Malwa regions), Maharashtra's Khandesh and Vidarbha region, Gujarat, and Uttar Pradesh.

In Rajasthan and neighbouring regions, daal bati is commonly served with churma as the complete meal known as dal bati churma.

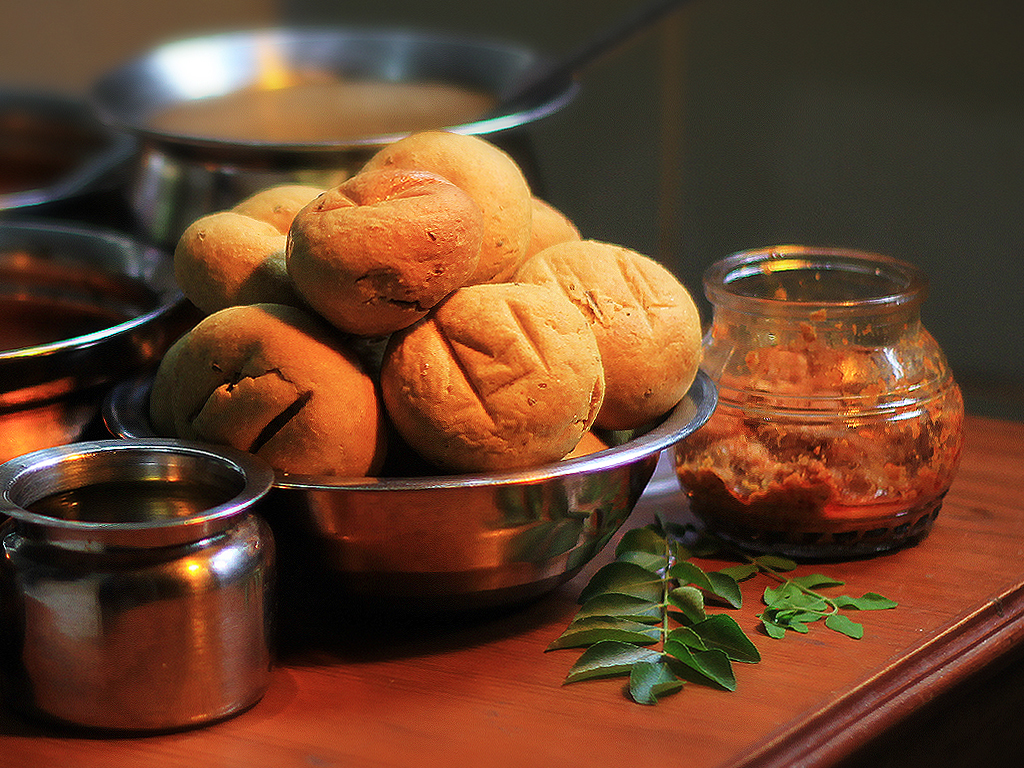
Daal bati served with churma

Daal is prepared using tuvaar dal, chana daal (prepared by removing the skin of split chickpeas), mung dal, moth dal, or urad dal. The pulses or lentils are cooked together after being soaked in water for a few hours. First, a small amount of vegetable oil is heated in a frying pan and then the seasoning rai-jeera (mustard and cumin seeds) is added to the hot oil. Then green chilli, garlic and some spices including asafoetida, red chilli, turmeric, coriander, and ginger are added. There may be a sweet and sour version of the dal in some regions. Finally, the boiled daal is added and cooked.

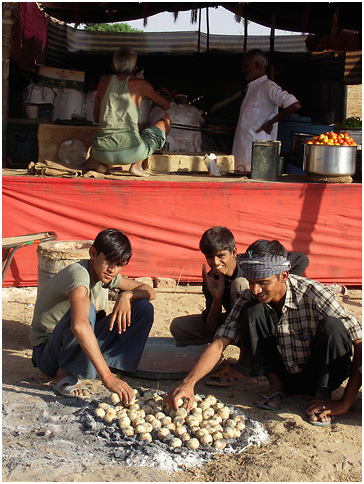
Batti being cooked over coal for daal bati, Pushkar Camel Fair

Batti is a hard bread made up of wheat flour commonly known as aata. Wheat flour is kneaded with salt, dahi (yogurt) and water. Tennis ball-sized round balls of this dough are cooked in a well-heated traditional oven or in an earthen stove. When the baati becomes golden brown in colour, it is greased with ghee and is then served with daal, rava laddoo, rice, pudina chutney, kairi (raw mango) chutney, garlic chutney, green salad with much onion, and fresh buttermilk.

== Serving with churma ==
In Rajasthan and Haryana, dal bati is often served with churma as a complete meal known as dal bati churma. The combination is associated with festivals such as Makar Sankranti and Diwali in parts of Rajasthan, and is also prepared during ceremonies such as weddings and housewarming events.

Churma is a sweet dish made of coarsely grounded wheat flour, bajra (millet) flour, or semolina. It is made by grinding the fire-baked or fried dough balls and mixing them with ghee, powdered sugar or jaggery and dry fruits.

== History ==
Information regarding the origins of the dish is scarce: however, it has long been a part of cuisines from the western region of India, i.e., Rajasthan, Haryana, and parts of Gujarat.

Baati made of unsalted wheat, ghee and camel milk was first mentioned during the time of Bappa Rawal—the founder of the kingdom of Mewar in Rajasthan. They were known as a nomadic warrior tribe before they settled into the tapestry of a kingdom and got Chittor in form of dowry from Maan Mori, Baati was the Guhilot's official wartime meal.

Baati, a traditional dish, is said to have originated with soldiers who would break the dough into chunks and bury them under thin layers of sand to bake under the sun. According to anecdotal accounts, upon their return, soldiers would find perfectly baked roundels, which were then dunked in ghee. On occasion, curd or buttermilk might also have been added. Initially, baati was paired with ghee and curd, while the addition of dal and churma later developed into the complete meal known as dal bati churma.

Some anthropologists suggest that at a grassroots level, baati was still commonly paired with ghee and buttermilk or curd made from camel or goat milk, while the combination of dal and baati was more common among the upper caste. This shift may have been influenced by the presence of traders in Mewar or by culinary practices from the Gupta period, during which Panchmael Dal was considered a delicacy. These connections are largely speculative, and the extent of their historical accuracy remains uncertain.

The inclusion of churma, now regarded as an integral part of dal bati churma, is often attributed to the House of Mewar. Folklore holds that churma was discovered when a cook accidentally poured sugarcane juice into the baati during wartime. Other stories suggest that homemakers soaked the baatis in sugar or jaggery water to preserve them for their husbands, which eventually evolved into churma. These origins are also anecdotal, and there is no definitive evidence to confirm the precise development of churma or its association with dal bati.

== Dal bafla ==
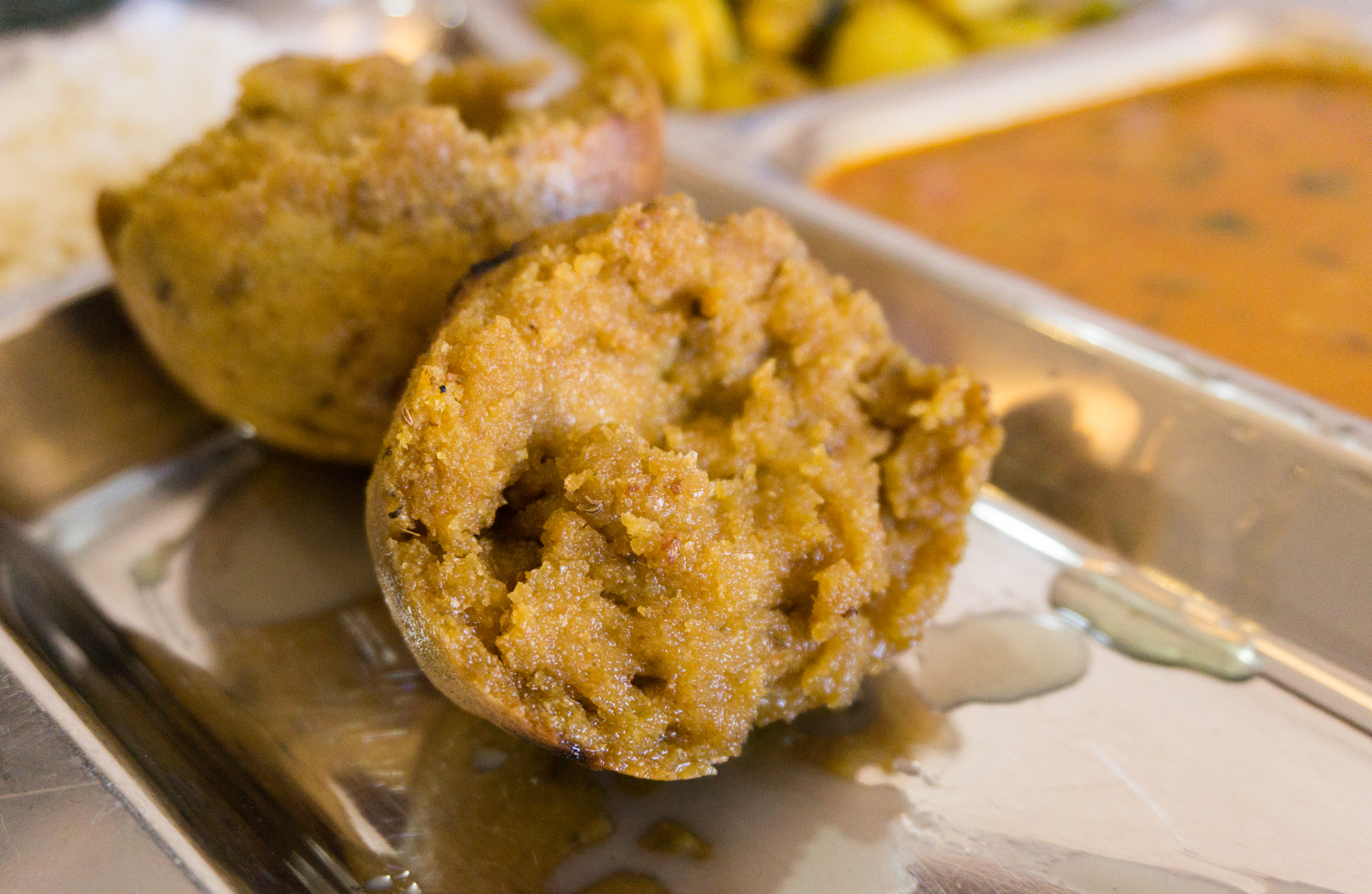
Dal bafla at a restaurant in Mandu

Dal bafla (Hindi: दाल बाफ़्ला) is a variation of dal bati, where the normal bafla is boiled before baking it in a traditional baati oven. Baati is replaced by the bafla, a softer version of it. It is native to the Malwa region of Madhya Pradesh. However, parts of Rajasthan have been consuming bafla and claim it to be native to their regions.

== See also ==
- Dal bati churma
- Katt bafla
