= Gujarati kadhi =

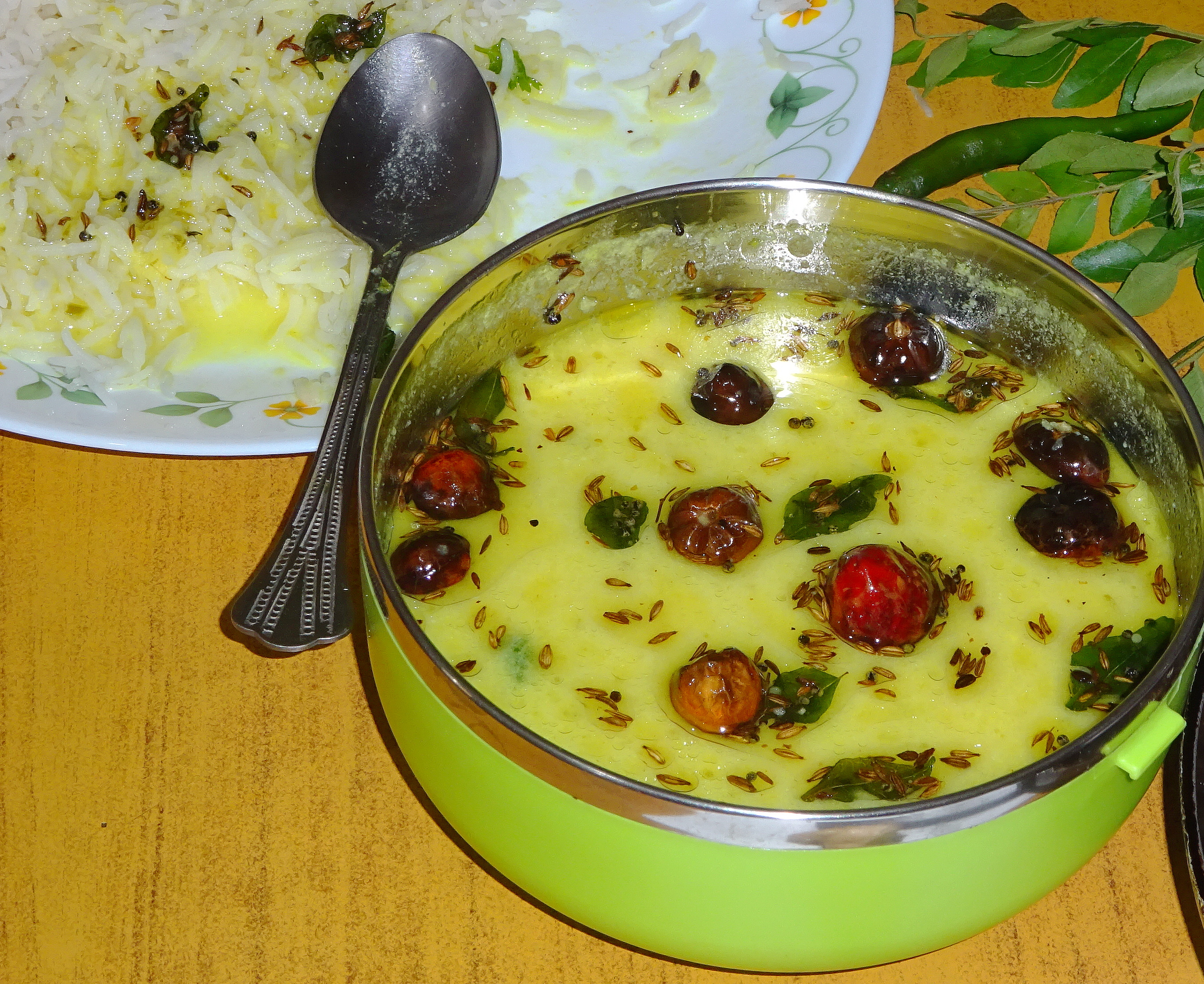
- Hot Gujarati kadhi in a bowl
- Type: Soup
- Place of origin: Indian subcontinent
- Serving temperature: Hot
- Main ingredients: Dahi (yogurt), gram flour
- Variations: Rajasthani kadhi pakoda, Sindhi kadhi, East Indian kadhi badi, South Indian majjige pulusu

Gujarati kadhi (Gujarati: કઢી) is a Gujarati version of kadhi. It is made from buttermilk or dahi (yogurt) and gram flour. Kadhi is an essential part of Gujarati cuisine.

== Popularity ==
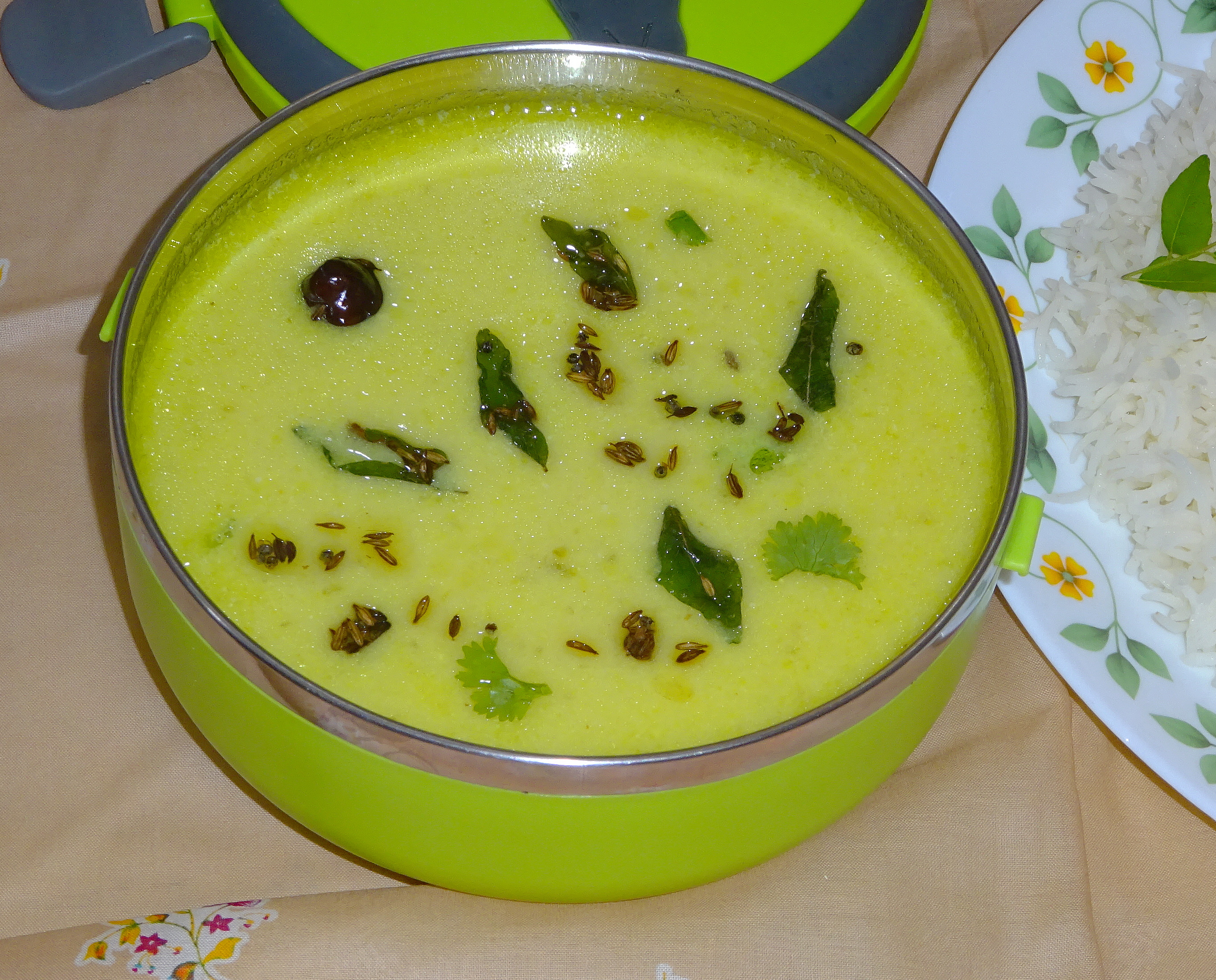
Gujarati kadhi served with bhaat (steamed rice)

When Barack Obama visited India he was served Gujarati kadhi. Kadhi was included on the Chinese president's menu when he visited Ahmedabad. Kadhi has different varieties in India. Gujarati kadhi is different from Sindhi kadhi, Rajasthani kadhi pakoda, badi kadhi or Uttar Pradesh kadhi in that all are yoghurt-based (except Sindhi kadhi, which has a tamarind base). In Gujarat, it is served with khichdi or steamed rice.

== Preparation ==
Gujarati kadhi is lighter when compared to Rajasthani kadhi. The curd and gram flour are turned into a liquid mixture by mixing with a few cups of water. Chopped green chilies, chopped ginger and asafoetida are fried in a pan on medium flame. After that the curd paste is mixed and heated for a few minutes and stirred. The kadhi is then served hot with khichdi, naan, chapati or rice.

=== Ingredients ===
Dahi (yogurt), gram flour, asafoetida, cinnamon powder, mustard seeds, curry leaves and coriander leaves are the main ingredients.

=== Variations ===
Variations include East Indian kadhi badi, Sindhi kadhi, Rajasthani kadhi pakoda, and Kathiawadi kadhi.
