= Newens Sanitary Dairy Historic District =

Historic district in Iowa, United States

- U.S. National Register of Historic Places
- U.S. Historic district
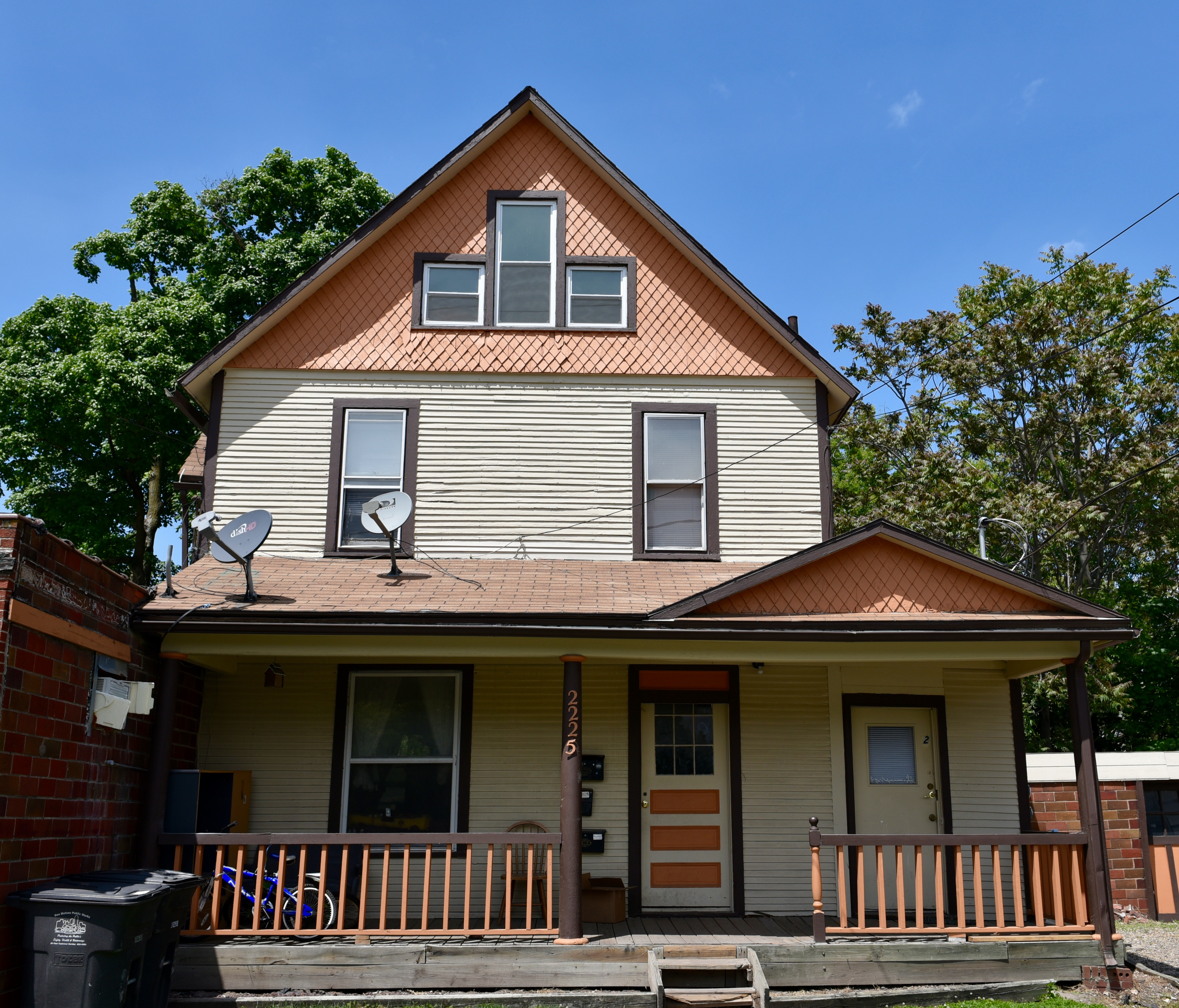

- Location within Iowa Location within the United States
- Location: 2225 and 2300-2312 University Ave. Des Moines, Iowa
- Coordinates: 41°36′1″N 93°38′52″W
- Area: less than one acre
- Architectural style: Late 19th and early 20th century American movements
- NRHP reference No.: 03000062
- Added to NRHP: December 17, 2003

The Newens Sanitary Dairy Historic District is located in Des Moines, Iowa, United States. It consists of three buildings, the former dairy buildings and the Newens’ family home. The district has been listed on the National Register of Historic Places since 2003.

== History ==
The Newens family began the dairy around 1910. Lynn Newens ran the business out of his home on 26th Street. In 1913 the business moved to 2300-2306 University Avenue. Three years later it expanded to 2300–2312. In 1918 the dairy bought the last two lots on University. The Newens’ built a new building in 1922.

=== Dairy Plant ===
At the time the dairy was founded developments were being advanced in the dairy industry and cities such as Des Moines started supervising dairy sanitation. In 1910 Des Moines hired their first city milk inspector. Newens Sanitary Dairy communicated their intent to produce a fresh, quality safe product. They also used their family name in the company name to back up the product with an established reputation. Adrian Newens, Lynn's brother and company president, had been a professor of oratory at nearby Drake University and Iowa State College before starting a successful speaking career. The dairy's name was shortened to Newens Dairy Co. in the 1920s and to Newens-Northland Co. after it merged with their competitor Northland Dairy and Furnas Ice Cream company in 1929. The business moved from University Avenue in 1935 and the company made one last name change in the 1940s to the Northland Milk Co.

The dairy complex comprised a front office, milk processing and bottling area, vehicle storage and a stable for the horses. The stable was on the second floor above the vehicle storage building, which was separate from the rest of the operation. Horses were used to transport the milk until the early 1940s when a stable in a different location was destroyed in a fire that killed 22 horses.

Deliveries of dairy products started at midnight. The dairy bought milk from local farmers and in order to deliver it the milk had to be tested, clarified, pasteurized and bottled. The two main reasons the milk was processed was to destroy human pathogens through pasteurization and to maintain product quality. Pasteurization was not required so not all dairies did it because of the added expense. The dairy needed to maintain strict cleanliness of the facility. Newens advertised, “Pasteurized Milk and Cream, Buttermilk and Cottage Cheese" and "You are invited to inspect our plant at any time. We pride ourselves on our cleanliness.”

Newens also was part of the Des Moines Milk Dealers Bottle Exchange, Inc. It was a local trade group that washed and returned empty bottles from participating dairies. Lynn Newens probably served as an officer. Once Newens merged with Northland much of the University Avenue plant was left vacant. The bottle exchange was moved into the facility from 1934 to 1947. Newens-Northland retained ownership of the building and rented it to other businesses. It sold the buildings in 1951 to the Biermann family. Harry Biermann operated an electrical shop out of the former dairy's front office. His sons joined him in the business. Eventually they branched out into electrical engineering and became the Biermann Electric Co. They utilized the former dairy processing area and vehicle storage building, and rented the storefronts and offices to various tenants over the years. Biermann Electric sold the building to 2300 University Avenue L.L.C. in the fall of 2001.

== House ==
Lynn Newens and his wife Susan, who worked as the company's bookkeeper, and their daughter moved into a house to the east of the dairy at 2220 University Avenue around 1913. The 1916 city directory shows the Newenses were living across the street at 2225 University Avenue. It is a large Victorian house on a corner lot. It was on the diagonal from the dairy. Lynn and Susan lived in the house for more than 15 years. After Susan's death, Lynn moved to his daughter's house nearby. Carman G. Mount, dairy "plant man", and his family moved into the house and lived there until about 1938. The Newens family continued to own the house until the mid-1940s.
