= Katt bafla =

Food from Northern India

- Course: Main course
- Place of origin: Kota, Bundi
- Region or state: Hadoti
- Associated cuisine: Rajasthani cuisine
- Created by: Pandits
- Main ingredients: Wheat flour, ghee, jaggery
- Similar dishes: Dal bati churma

Katt bafla is a popular and traditional dish from the Kota and Bundi districts of Hadoti region in Rajasthan, India. It is a famous dish across the north Indian states in India. Traditionally this dish is made on every occasion in Rajasthan. Bafla is a type of spherical wheat bread whereas the katt is a type of barfi made with a mixture of unsalted wheat bread coarse powder with ghee and jaggery powder. Traditionally this dish is served with daal and kadhi.

== History ==
Rajasthan is famous for its history as well as its various dishes such as dal baati churma. There are special confectioners who make this food for making dal baati churma who are also called Pandits in Rajasthan. It is said that earlier Brahmins used to eat this food and they used to cook it. But with time now everyone is eating this dish. For this reason, the confectioner of this food is called Pandit or this food is called Pandit's food. The reason behind this is that it is pure and all the procedures are followed while eating which purifies that food. That is why the artisan who makes this food is called Pandit. This dish is offered to God in the form of bhog in most religious programs. It is specially served on a plate made of the leaves of a tree, which is called pattal.

== Katt ==
Katt is a kind of dessert. It is made by mixing coarse powder of unsalted wheat bread cooked on dry dung fuel and mixed with ghee, powdered sugar or jaggery powder, Then this mixture is spread on a tray and kept for a while to set and decorated with dry fruit clippings, then it is cut into small square pieces and given a barfi-like shape.

== Bafla ==
Bafla is prepared by making of dough of wheat flour with buttermilk and some whole spices like fennel seeds, coriander seeds, and ajwain are added. Then round-shaped balls are made with this dough and boiled in water until they are cooked through. After boiling, the baflas are typically roasted or baked on dry dung fuel or in a tandoor (clay oven) until they acquire a crispy texture. The roasting process gives the baflas a smoky flavor and a golden-brown color.

Once the baflas are cooked and roasted, they are dipped in ghee so that they can soak up the ghee properly and served with katt daal and kadhi.
