= Manteiga-da-terra =

Clarified butter product

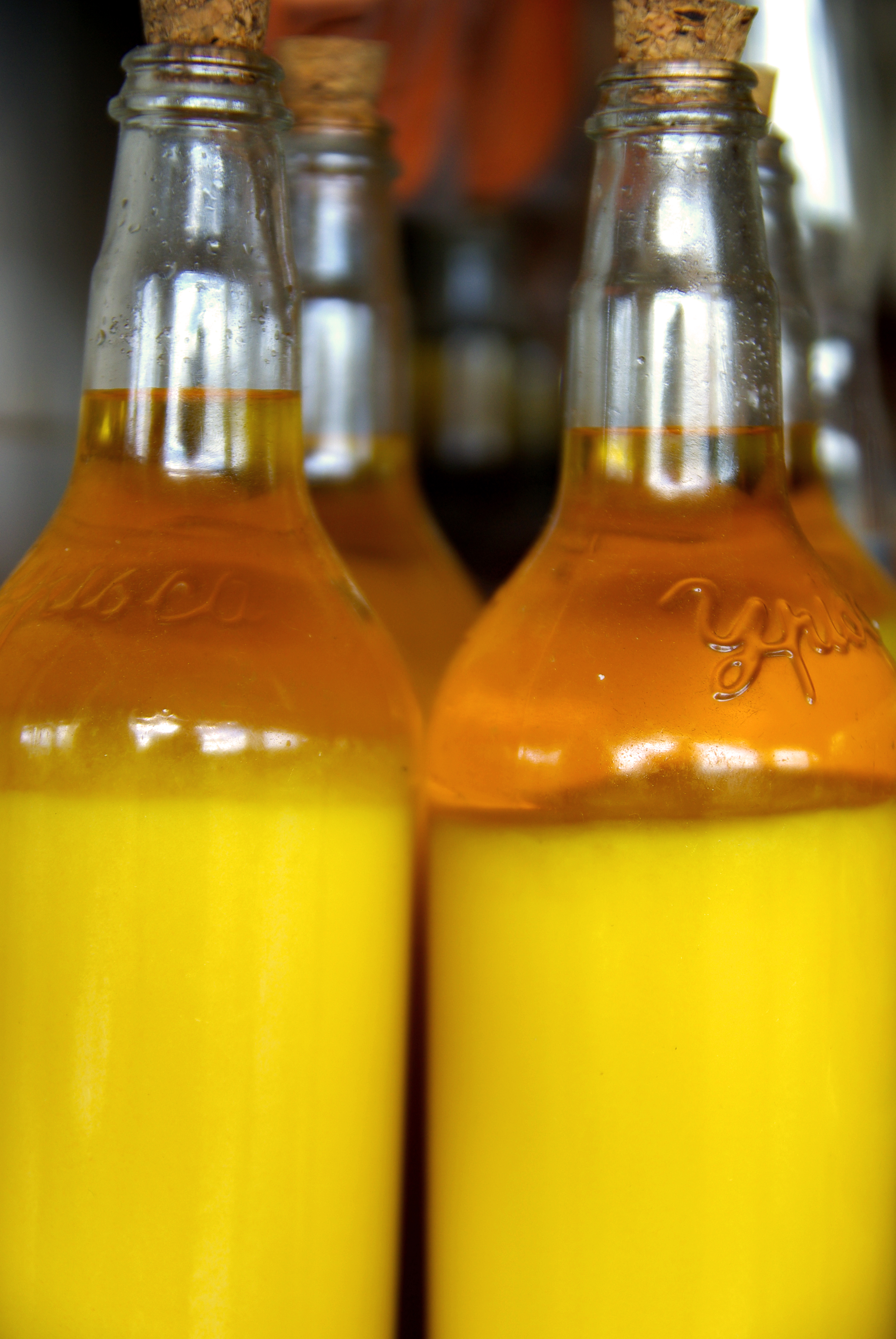
Manteiga de garrafa for sale in Tianguá (Ceará)

Manteiga-de-garrafa (butter-from-a-bottle) or manteiga-da-terra (butter of the land) are terms in northeastern Brazil to refer to a clarified butter product, similar to Indian ghee. The product is also known as manteiga de gado (cattle butter) and manteiga de cozinha (kitchen butter).

Manteiga de garrafa is a dairy product made from the cream of cows' milk. The cream is processed by physical agitation, as in a blender or beating by hand, followed by cooking at a temperature of 100 °C (212 °F) to 130 °C (266 °F). Salt may also be added. Some recipes for making manteiga de garrafa include a step prior to cooking in which the congealed cream is washed in cold water. The cooking process separates the cream into two components, the manteiga (butter) and the "borra" (a watery precipitate). The manteiga is separated from the borra by filtration, and then placed in bottles. The finished product is almost pure fat, with a low water activity. Accordingly, it is inhospitable to microbial growth and can be kept at room temperature.

Manteiga de garrafa is a yellow-orange, viscous liquid which may be opaque or semi-translucent. It is strongly flavored, with flavors of cheese, fish, rancidity, and barnyard composing part of the flavor profile. Manteiga de garrafa is a characteristic part of the cuisine of the northeast of Brazil, particularly the Sertão. It is used for cooking in much the same way as ordinary butter.

The borra that is removed during processing is also eaten. It can be eaten with bread, or used as an ingredient in farofa, carne-de-sol, feijão verde, and in cooking fried eggs or cassava (macaxeira).

Manteiga de garrafa is a product of artisanal or small-scale manufacturing, as well as home production; there are no fixed standards, and its quality and flavor can vary. It is distributed by means of street fairs, town markets, supermarkets, restaurants and small shops.

== See also ==
- Ghee
- Clarified butter
