= Dal bati churma =

Dish in Rajasthani cuisine

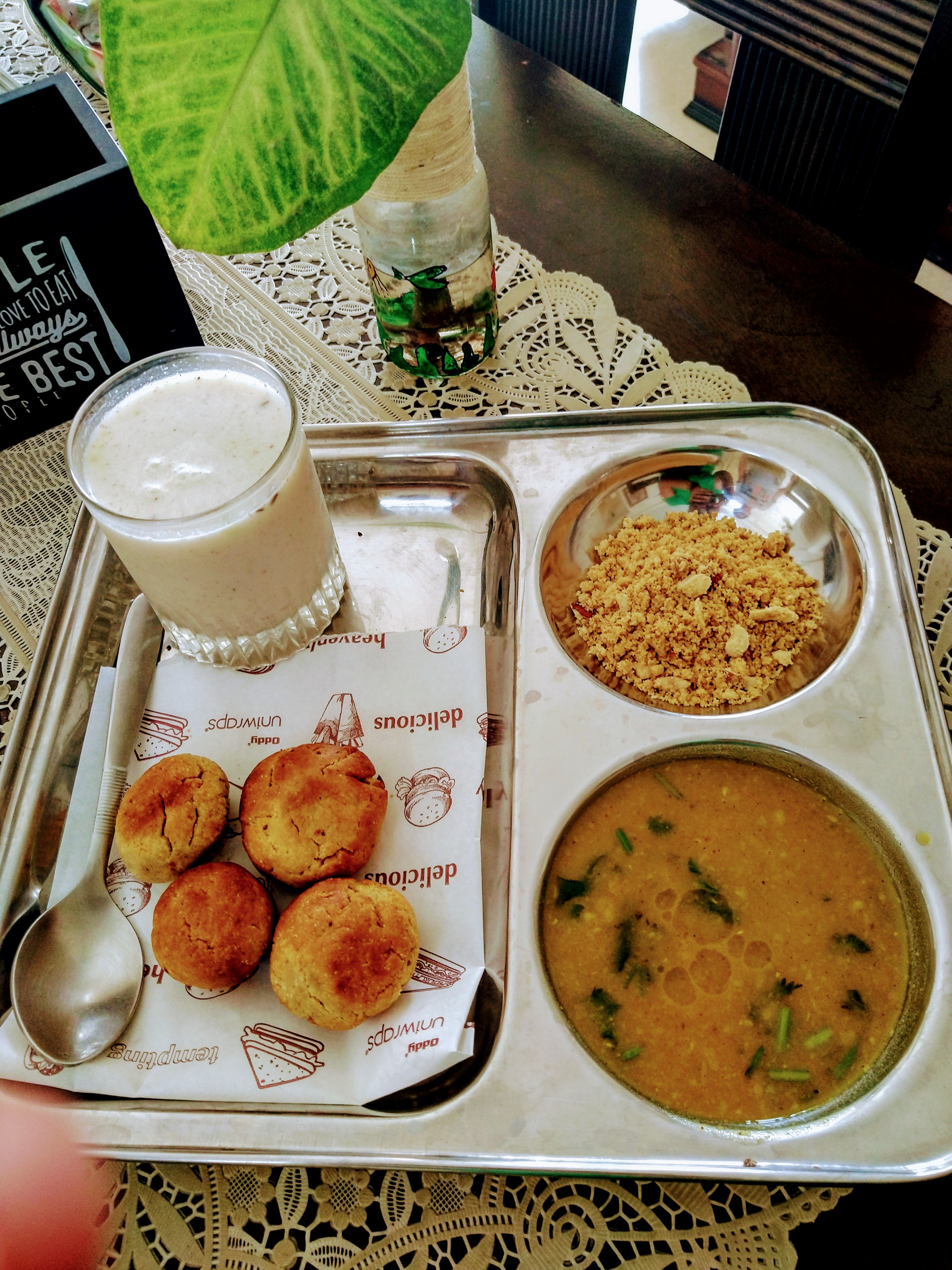
Dal (bottom right), bati (bottom left), and churma (top right)

Dal bati churma is the most popular dish in Rajasthani cuisine. It is a complete meal consisting of dal, bati, and churma. The combination of dal and bati without churma is known as dal bati. Dal is lentils, bati is a baked wheat ball, and churma is powdered sweetened cereal. Churma is a popular delicacy mostly served with baatis and dal as part of dal bati churma. It is coarsely ground wheat crushed and cooked with ghee and sugar. Traditionally it is made by mashing up wheat flour baatis or left over rotis in ghee and jaggery.

== See also ==
- Dal bati
