= Kadhi bari =

Vegetarian dish

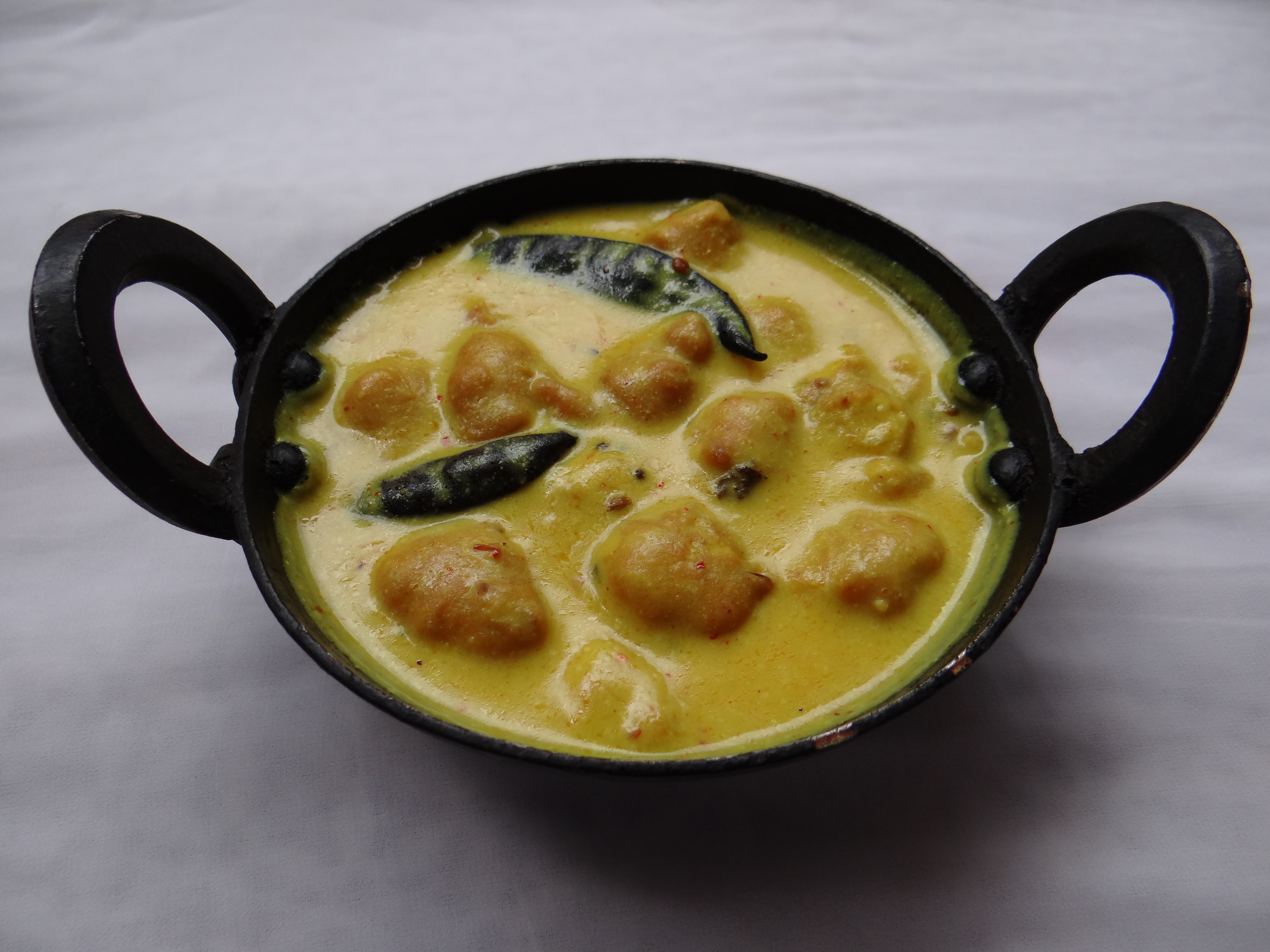
- Kadhi bari
- Course: Main course (Curry)
- Place of origin: India and Nepal
- Region or state: India (Uttarakhand, Bihar, Jharkhand and Uttar Pradesh) and Nepal (Madhesh, Province No. 1, Lumbini and Bagmati provinces)
- Main ingredients: Gram flour, Dahi, salt, onions, chili peppers, turmeric powder
- Ingredients generally used: Tejpatta, coriander leaves

Kadhi bari or bari kadhi (Bhojpuri: 𑂍𑂛𑂲 𑂥𑂩𑂲, romanized: Kadhi Barē) is an Indian vegetarian curry, made up of gram flour, dahi and spices. This vegetarian dish is popular in Bihar, Jharkhand and eastern Uttar Pradesh states of India as well as in Bagmati, Lumbini, Madhesh and No.1 provinces of Nepal.

The bari is made from paste of besan in a dumplings, which is later deep fried in cooking oil and Kadhi is made from mixing dahi, gram flour and spices. This dish is generally eaten in summer and festivals like Holi, Jur Sheetal and Krishna Janmashtami. It is usually served with steamed rice, but it can also be served with roti and puri.
