= Puri bhaji =

Indian Dish

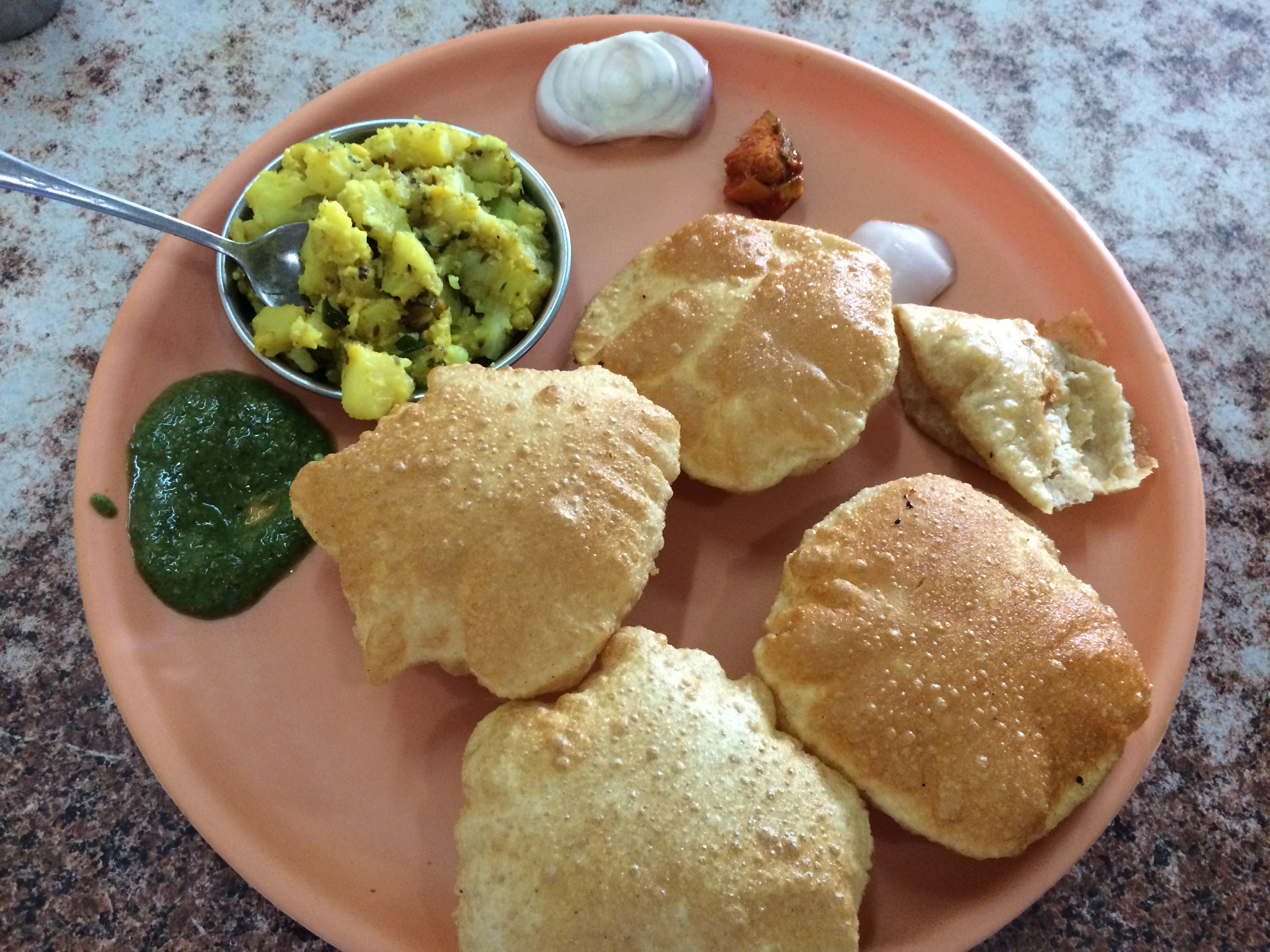
- Puri bhaji with (left to right) coriander chutney, potato bhaji, red onion and pickle in an Indian restaurant
- Course: Breakfast, lunch, snack
- Place of origin: Indian subcontinent
- Associated cuisine: India
- Main ingredients: Puri, aloo bhaji
- Variations: Chole bhature

Puri bhaji (sometimes spelled poori bhaji) is a dish, originating from the Indian subcontinent, of puri (deep-fried rounds of flour) and aloo (potato) bhaji (a spiced potato dish which may be dry or curried). It is a traditional breakfast dish in India.

Many Indian households prefer puri bhaji and other traditional dishes over cereals for breakfast. Some serve it for lunch along with condiments such as dahi (yogurt) and salad. In central India, puri bhaji is served as a street snack. Puri bhaji is a vegetarian dish and is popular in India where its flavor and relatively cheap price are valued. The dish is also served on railway platforms in India and is served as a packed lunch on trains along with pickle. Puri bhaji can also be served with Lapsi.

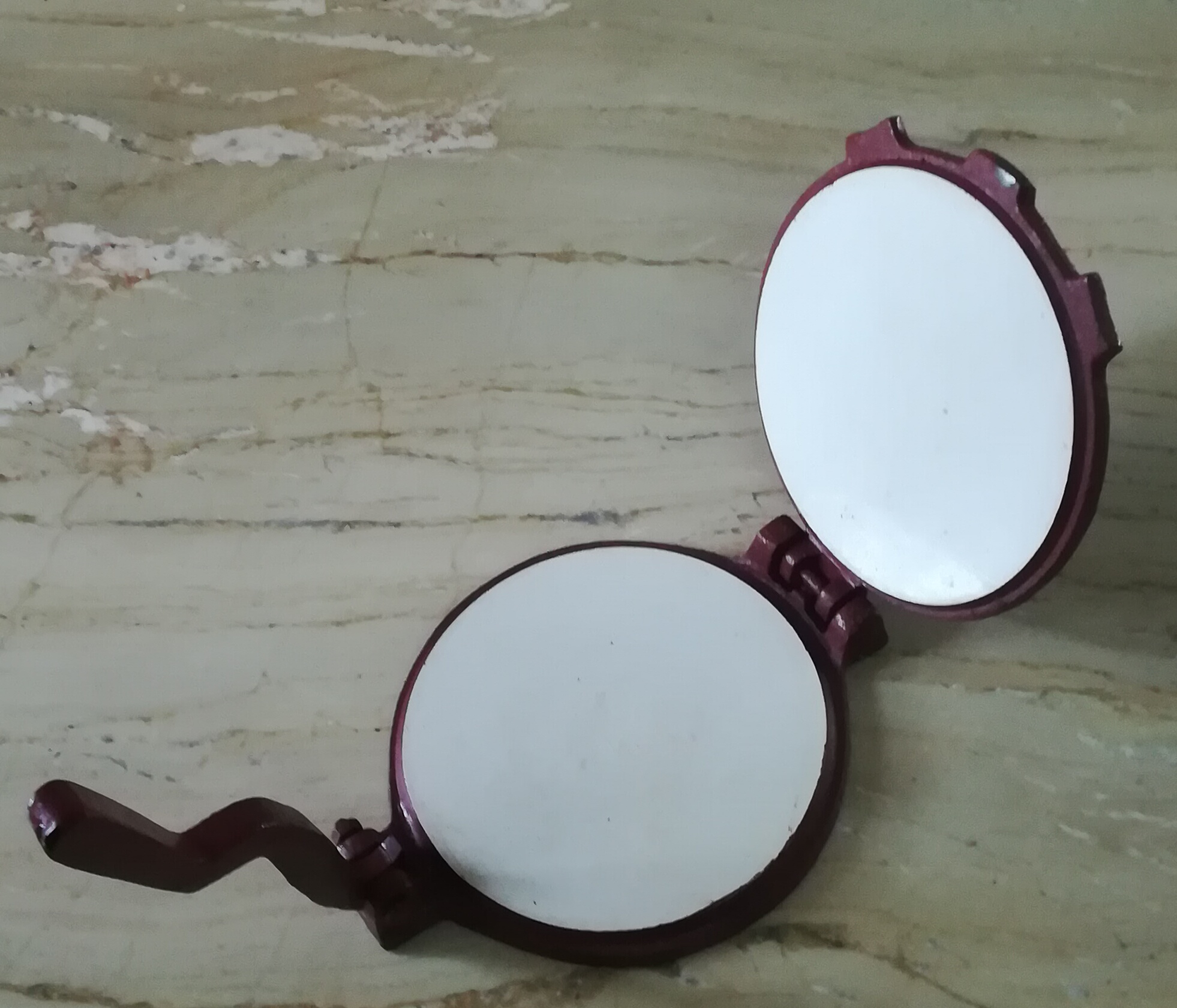
Poorimane

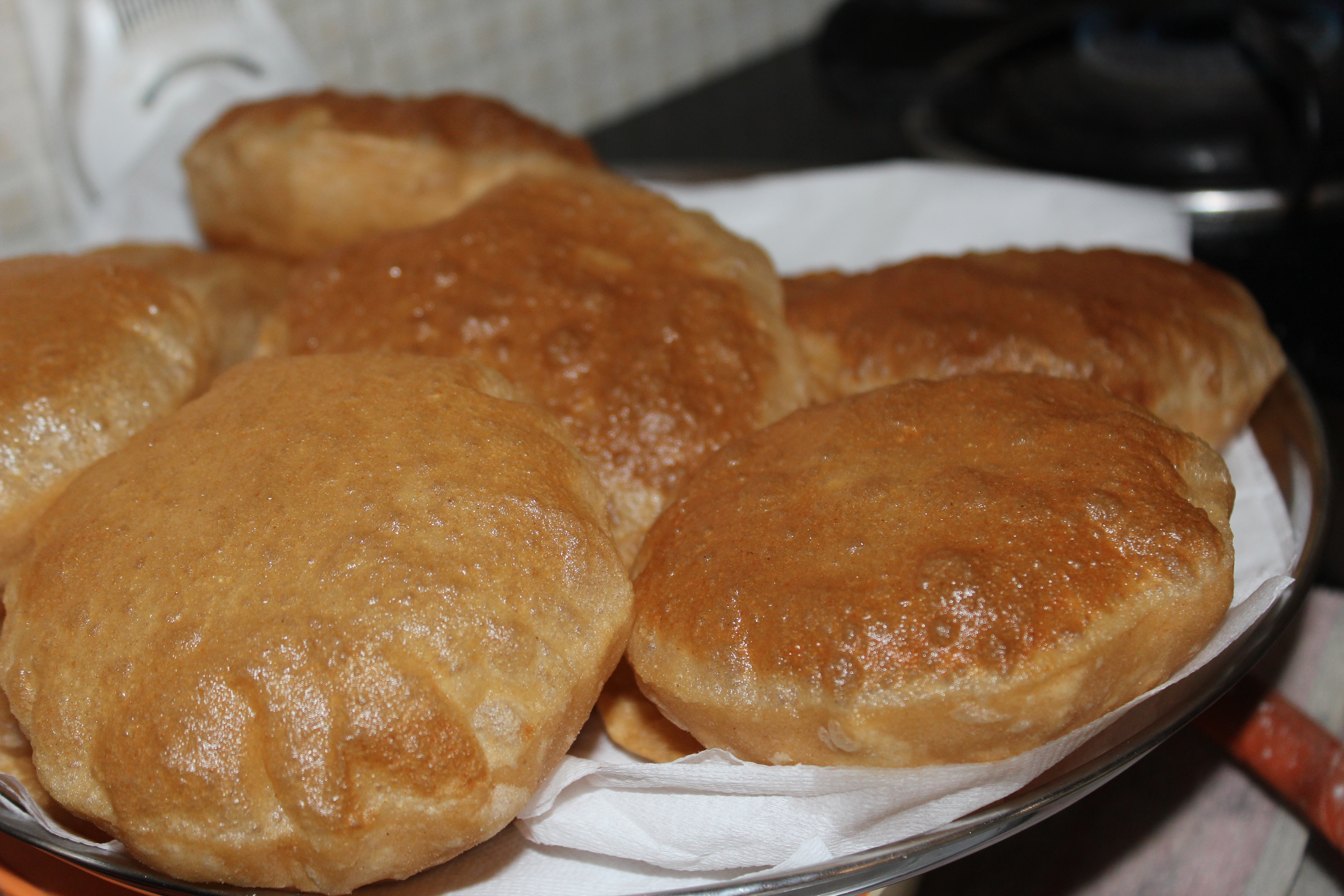
Fresh puris made at home
