= Wild melon =

Wild melon is a common name used for several species of plants in the melon family (Cucurbitaceae) which grow outside of cultivation

Wild melon may refer to:

- Citrullus lanatus, a plant invasive in Australia with fruits much larger than a golf ball
- Cucumis myriocarpus a plant invasive in Australia with fruits smaller than a golf ball
- Lagenaria sphaerica, a plant native to Southern and Eastern Africa
