= Sattu =

Type of flour

Sattu or Satui (Hindi: सत्तू; Bhojpuri: सतुआ/सातु; Nepali: सातु) is a type of flour, mainly used in Nepal, India and Tibet. Sattu is made up of dry-roasted and ground pulses and cereals. The dry powder is prepared in various ways as a principal or secondary ingredient of dishes. Satui is used in vegetarian cuisine as it can be a source of protein.

In Bihar and Nepal, sattu is usually made from dry-roasted chickpeas, maize or barley. It is also common for people to mix sattu of different pulses together to suit their appetite and taste.

== Etymology ==
The word sattu is derived from the Sanskrit word sáktu, meaning coarsely ground parched barley meal. References to sattu (sáktu) occur in Ayurvedic literature.

== History ==
The origin of Sattu is in eastern India and Terai region of Nepal. The process of preparing sattu is ancient and it is popular over a wide area of Nepal, Northern and Eastern India, particularly Bihar, eastern Uttar Pradesh, Uttarakhand, Jharkhand and West Bengal.

In the Bhojpuri region, sattu is widely regarded as a distinctive and highly popular food. It has traditionally been an integral part of rural Bhojpuri life, and is closely associated with everyday food practices as well as seasonal and religious traditions.

In Bhojpuri culture, sattu is particularly associated with the observance of Satuaan, held in the month of Chait (March–April), when sattu is traditionally consumed and served with chutney made from unripe mangoes. In the Panchkosi Mela of Buxar, sattu and sattu-filled littis are traditionally offered as prasad to Lord Rama. In the Lota-Bhanta Mela of Banaras, sattu-filled littis are traditionally prepared and offered to Lord Shiva.

Sattu is also used in the South Indian state of Telangana as prasadam or Nivedyam offered to Batukamma during Navarathri.

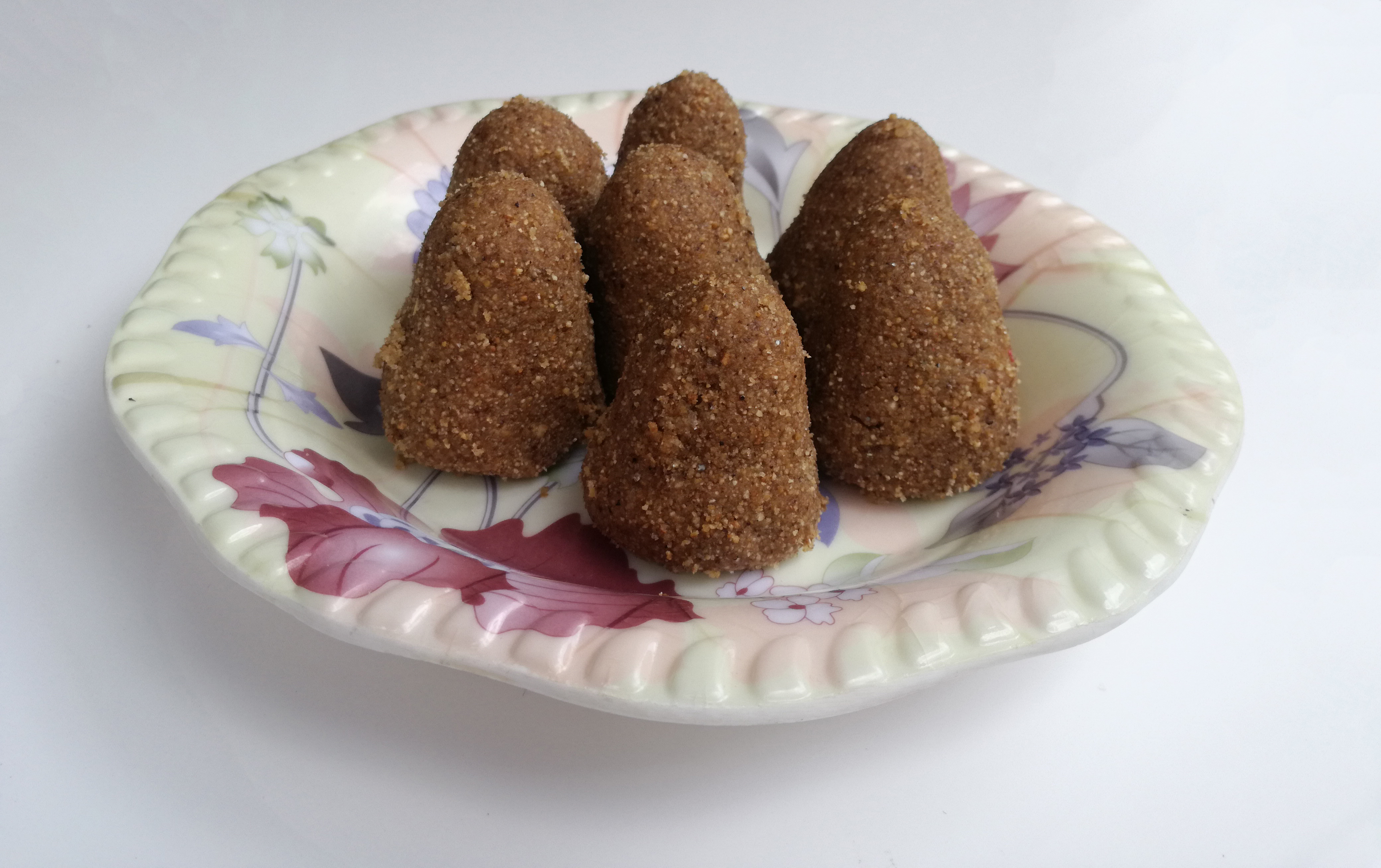
Satui prepared for Teejdi (or Teej) festival in Tharparkar region of Sindh, Pakistan

== Uses ==
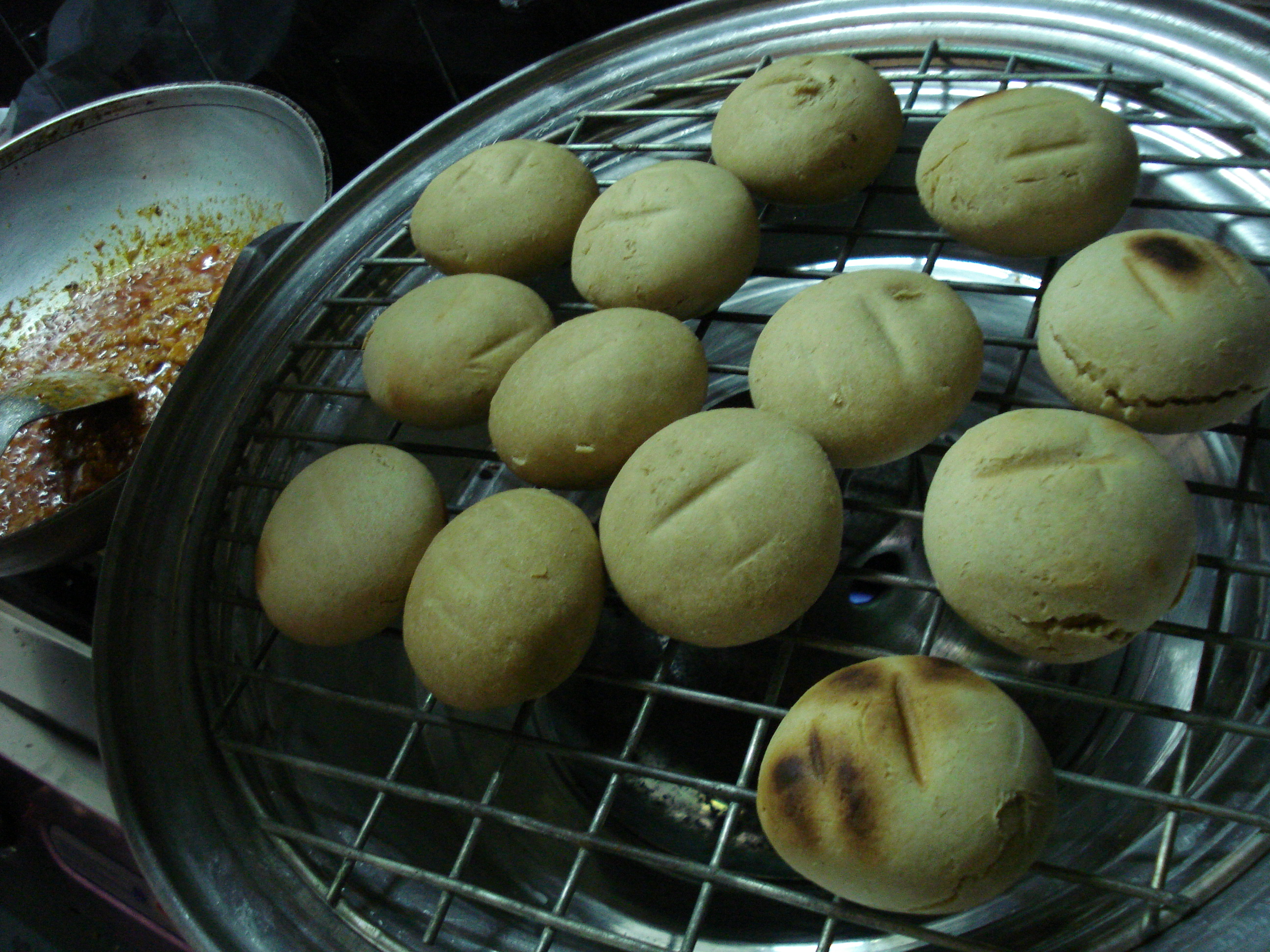
Sattu is the main ingredient in litti.

Satui is used in regional cuisines in varying degrees. In Nepal, Bihar, eastern Uttar Pradesh, Uttrakhand, Punjab and Delhi, the use of satui is extensive.

In the Bhojpuri region, sattu is consumed as an independent food as well as used primarily as a filling for parathas and sattu-filled litti, which may be known locally as makuni, phutehari or bhabhari according to its shape and form. It has traditionally formed part of everyday food practices in Bhojpuriya rural life.

In eastern Uttar Pradesh, Bihar and Jharkhand, specially in the Bhojpuri areas, it is commonly served cold as a savoury drink during intense heat waves in summer or as a porridge or soft dough. Sweet dishes combine satui with fruit slices, sugar and milk. In savoury dishes, sattu may be flavored with green chili, lemon juice and salt. Satui is prepared with toasted gram flour as well as toasted barley, or a mixture of both.

In Punjab, it is used as a cold drink to mitigate heat and dehydration effects. It is a popular traditional summer drink in Pakistan's Punjab region as well. The traditional way is to mix it with water and shakker (Punjabi) (Urdu) (Hindi) (jaggery). It is usually served cold. In Punjab, satui is often a mix of toasted, ground barley.

In Odisha, it is a popular breakfast and is also called chhatua. Though there are many different ways to prepare chhatua, it is generally mixed with ripe bananas, cottage cheese (chenna), yogurt or milk.

Satui made from ground barley can also be mixed with salt and turmeric and rolled into balls. Alternatively, millet and corn grains are used.

== Ingredients ==
Satui is prepared by dry-roasting grains or grams, most often barley or Bengal gram. In Odisha, Satui or Chatua is made by dry-roasting cashew, almond, millet, barley and chickpea and grinding to a fine flour. The traditional way of preparing sattu involves the use of an iron vessel in which the grains or grams are roasted in sand. Afterwards, they are sieved and then ground into a fine flour. Sattu is also traditionally consumed mixed with cold water during summer months and is regarded as a refreshing drink in hot weather.

== Geography ==
Satui is common in the states of Bihar, Jharkhand, Purvanchal region of Uttar Pradesh, Madhya Pradesh, and Delhi.
