= Kadhi =

Yogurt-based dish from India

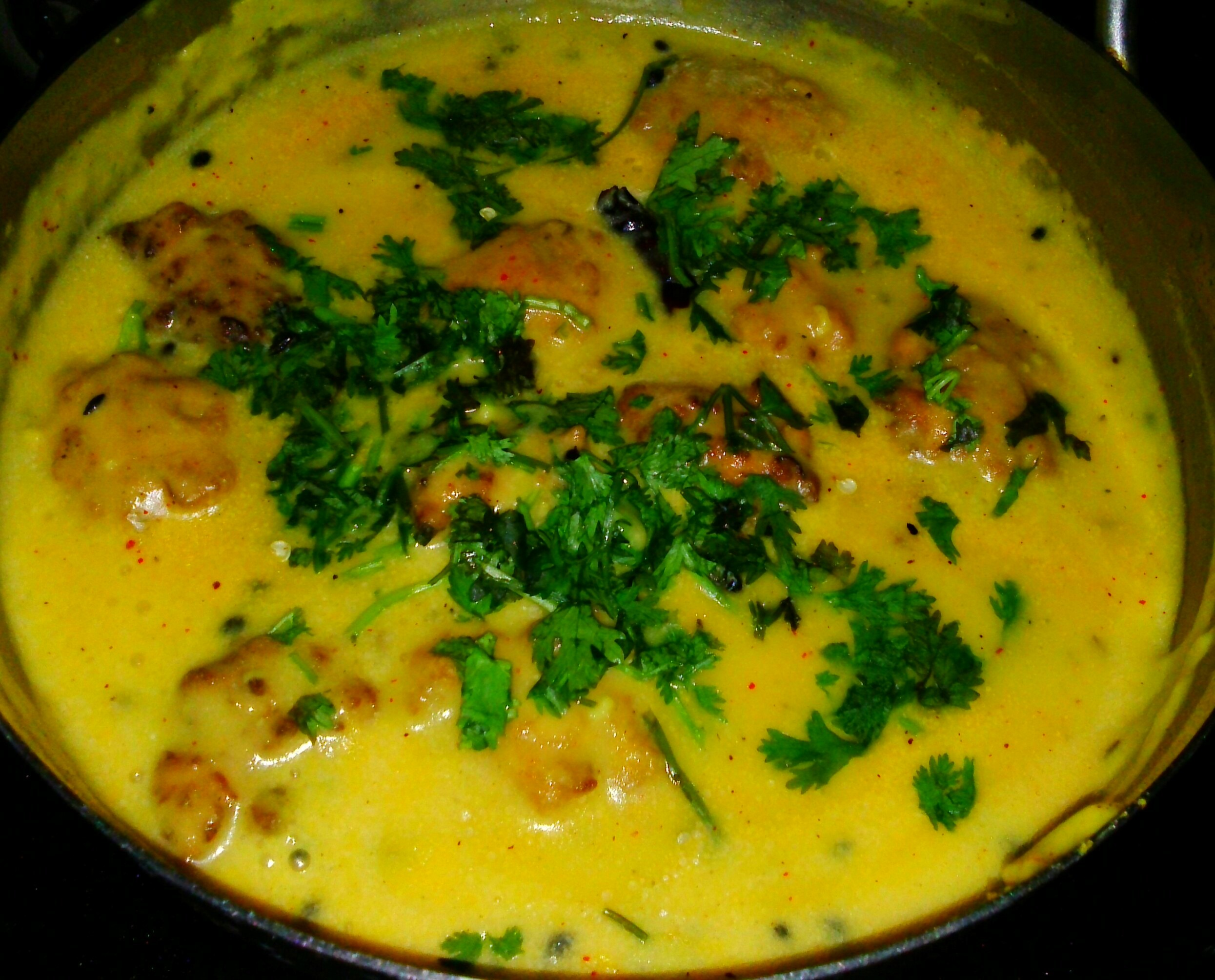
- Kadhi with red chilli as garnish
- Course: Lunch or dinner
- Place of origin: India
- Region or state: Rajasthan
- Associated cuisine: Indian
- Serving temperature: Hot or warm
- Main ingredients: Dahi (yogurt), gram flour, vegetables, water
- Variations: Kadhi chawal, kadhi bari, Rajasthani kadhi, Gujarati kadhi, Punjabi kadhi, Sindhi kadhi, Maharashtrian kadhi, Trinidadian kurhee

Kadhi or karhi is a yogurt-based dish originating from Rajasthan, India. It is made by simmering yogurt with besan (gram flour), and spices until it forms a thick, tangy gravy. It is sometimes mixed with pakoras (deep-fried fritters). It is often eaten with cooked rice or roti.

== Etymology ==
The word 'kadhi' is derived from the Sanskrit root kvathita (क्वथित) which refers to a decoction or a gruel of curcuma, asafoetida, and buttermilk. In Sanskrit literature, kadhi has been referred to with the name kvathika (क्वथिका).

== Origin ==
Kadhi is believed to have originated in Rajasthan, where cooks incorporated dairy products to compensate for the limited availability of vegetables in arid regions.

Although Punjabis may have a strong association with kadhi-chawal, its origins trace back to Rajasthan, according to Kunal Kapur. Historically, kadhi was first prepared in Rajasthan before spreading to Gujarat and Sindh regions. Chef Kunal elaborates that kadhi was traditionally concocted when households had surplus milk, which was churned into butter, leaving behind buttermilk (chaas) to be used in preparing kadhi.

== Variations ==
=== India ===
Kadhi is generally considered a staple everyday food in many parts of India and is thought to aid in digestion. In Gujarat and Rajasthan, it is usually served with khichdi, roti, paratha, or rice. Gujarati and Rajasthani kadhi differ from the Uttar Pradesh variety. Gujarati kadhi is a little sweeter than the other variants because sugar or jaggery is added to it, but it can be made without sugar for a more sour taste. It is eaten without pakoras, and its consistency is slightly thinner. Gujarati kadhi may be made from buttermilk, which gives it a smoother texture compared to yogurt. Variations of this basic dish include the addition of certain vegetables, notably bhindi (okra); kadhi containing okra is known as bhinda ni kadhi. In Punjab, kadhi is a simple and quick winter meal. Unlike the rest of India, yogurt may or may not be added – full-fat buttermilk may be used instead, although some households still prefer to use yogurt. Depending on the region, kadhi is commonly tempered with red chili peppers, cumin, coriander seeds, asafoetida, and fenugreek seeds.

In Western India, especially in coastal Maharashtra and in the Konkan region, kadhi is made with kokum, creating a variant called solkadhi. Other variants of kadhi in Maharashtra are made with kacchi kairi (raw mango), which is known as aambyachi kadhi (raw mango kadhi). Another variant of kadhi in Maharashtra is made with curd and buttermilk; this is known as takachi kadhi.

In Haryana, a popular variation is called haryanvi hara choley kadhi, made with besan and hare choley (raw green chickpeas) plus pure ghee, which is added during serving. Haryanvi kadhi is sometimes cooked with additional ingredients, such as seasonal farm-fresh green bathua leaves or kachri, a kind of small, wild melon.

In Purvanchal (eastern Uttar Pradesh) and Bihar, it is called kadhi-badi because of the addition of pakoras, small badi (or vadi) made out of chickpea flour, with no vegetables added (unlike standard pakora).

The name kadhi is also derived from several Indo-Aryan languages spoken in northern India, in which काढ़ना kadhna means 'to take out,' which, in this context, means to reduce, so the yogurt and chickpea curry is cooked for a very long time until it is reduced and the consistency changes from runny to thick and creamy.

In Southern states, fresh coconut ground with green chilies, ginger and cumin is added to slightly sour buttermilk/yogurt and is seasoned with asafoetida, mustard seeds, cumin, and fenugreek. Sometimes, split chickpeas soaked with coriander seeds and dry red chili pepper is puréed and added to the buttermilk/yogurt. Squash, ash gourd, okra, eggplant, cucumber, bell peppers are some of the vegetables that are added to the seasoning before bringing the soup to a boil. It is called majjige huli in Kannada, majjiga pulusu in Telugu, and mor kuzhambu in Tamil; all of these names have similar meanings. In Kerala, there are variations of this called kaalan, pulisseri, moru kari, etc.

The Sindhi diaspora in India usually make kadhi by roasting the chickpea flour and adding vegetables to the chickpea gravy. It is called kadhi because of the use of curry leaves, which are called kadhi patta in Sindhi. Instead of yogurt, tamarind pulp is used to give it a sour taste. An alternate method is to make a liquid mixture of chickpea flour instead of roasting chickpeas.

=== Pakistan ===
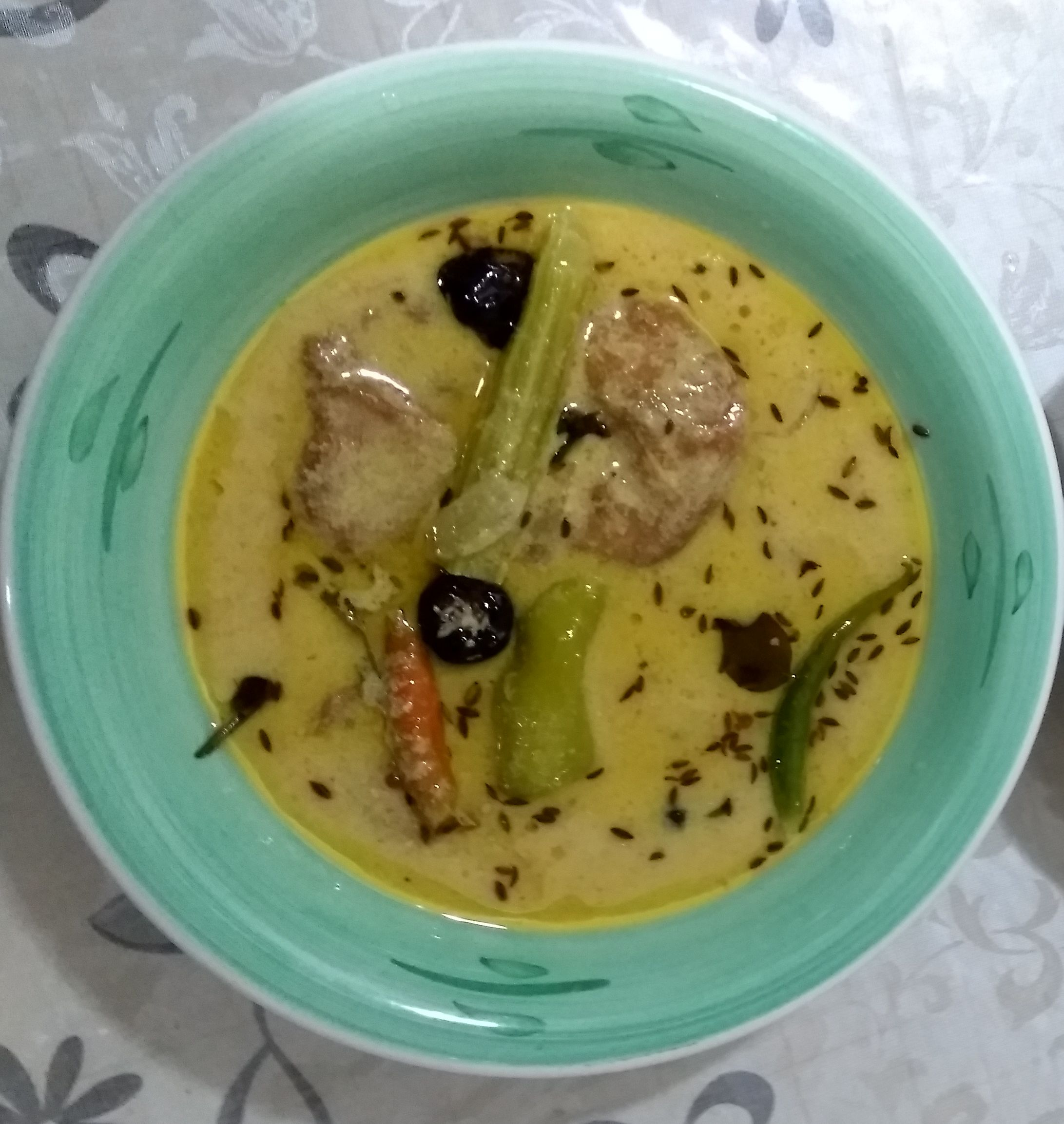
Popular in Southern Pakistan, Karachi, and Hyderabad. It can be made with the addition of vegetables such as drumstick beans.

In Pakistan, kadhi is usually served with steamed rice and naan. Thari people commonly refer to kadhi as raabro or khaatiyo.

In Northern Pakistan, particularly in the Hazara region of Khyber Pakhtunkhwa province, kadhi can include a variety of ingredients such as chicken, pumpkin, and sarson ka saag.

In Karachi and Hyderabad, Sindh, in addition to plain kadhi, a variety of vegetables such as okra, aubergine, and drumstick beans may be added. In Pakistan, kadhi is generally understood to always include fritters.

=== Trinidad and Tobago ===
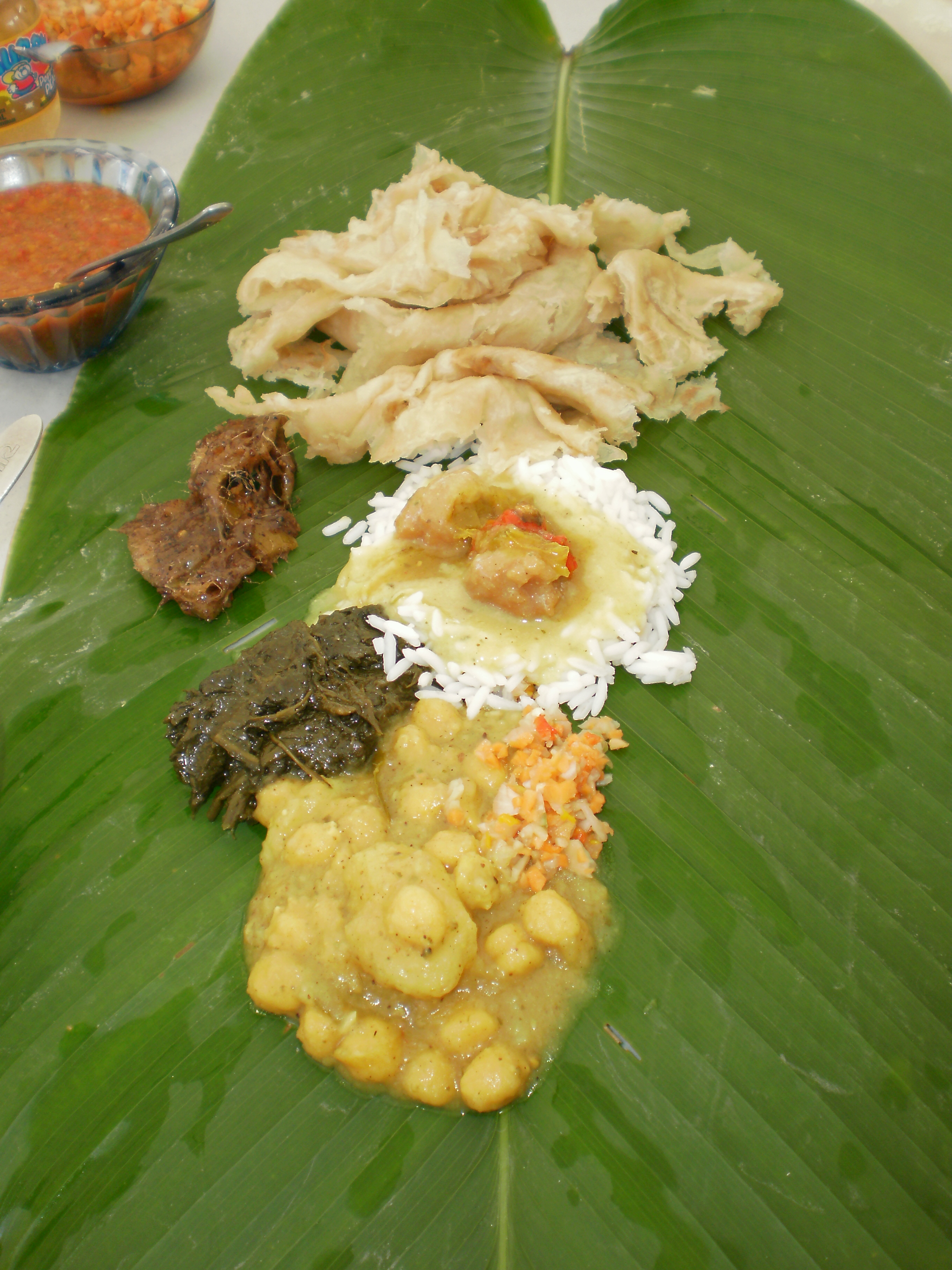
Diwali meal with kurhi on the rice, curry channa and aloo, mango tarkari, bhaji, and paratha

Kurhi was brought to Trinidad and Tobago by the indentured Indians from Uttar Pradesh, Bihar, and Jharkhand in the 19th and 20th century. It is a staple dish served with rice and other tarkaris at poojas, yajnas, Indian weddings, and Hindu religious festivals. It made in a similar preparation to its Indian counterpart, with the exception of dahi and grind dhal (yellow split-pea flour) is used instead of besan flour. It is made with pholouries (also referred to as "boulders") being placed in the grind dhal mixture.

== See also ==
- Rajasthani cuisine
- List of Indian dishes
- List of soups
- List of stews
