= Clarified butter =

Milk fat rendered from butter

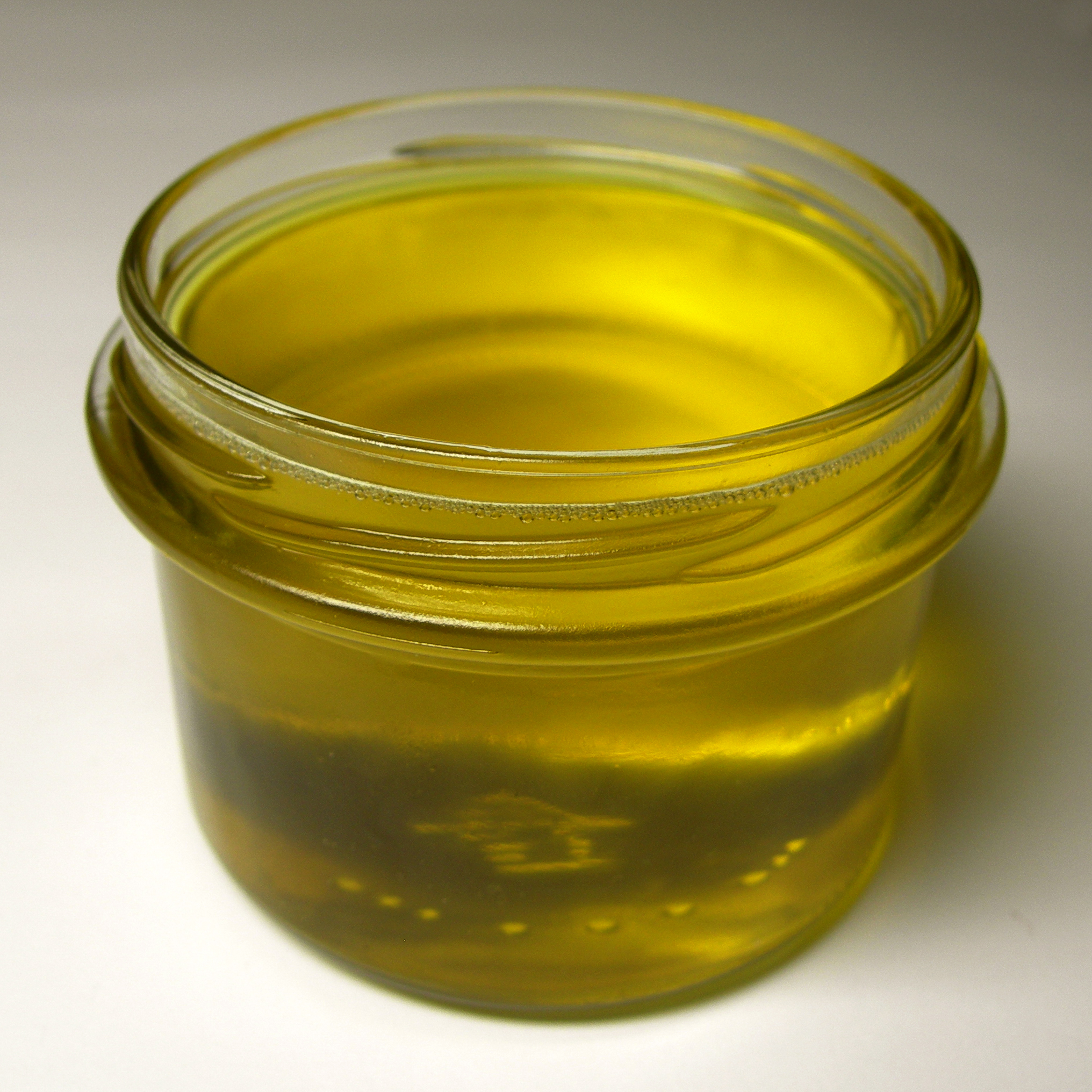
- Freshly made clarified butter, still liquid
- Place of origin: Worldwide distribution
- Main ingredients: Butter
- Variations: Ghee (samneh)

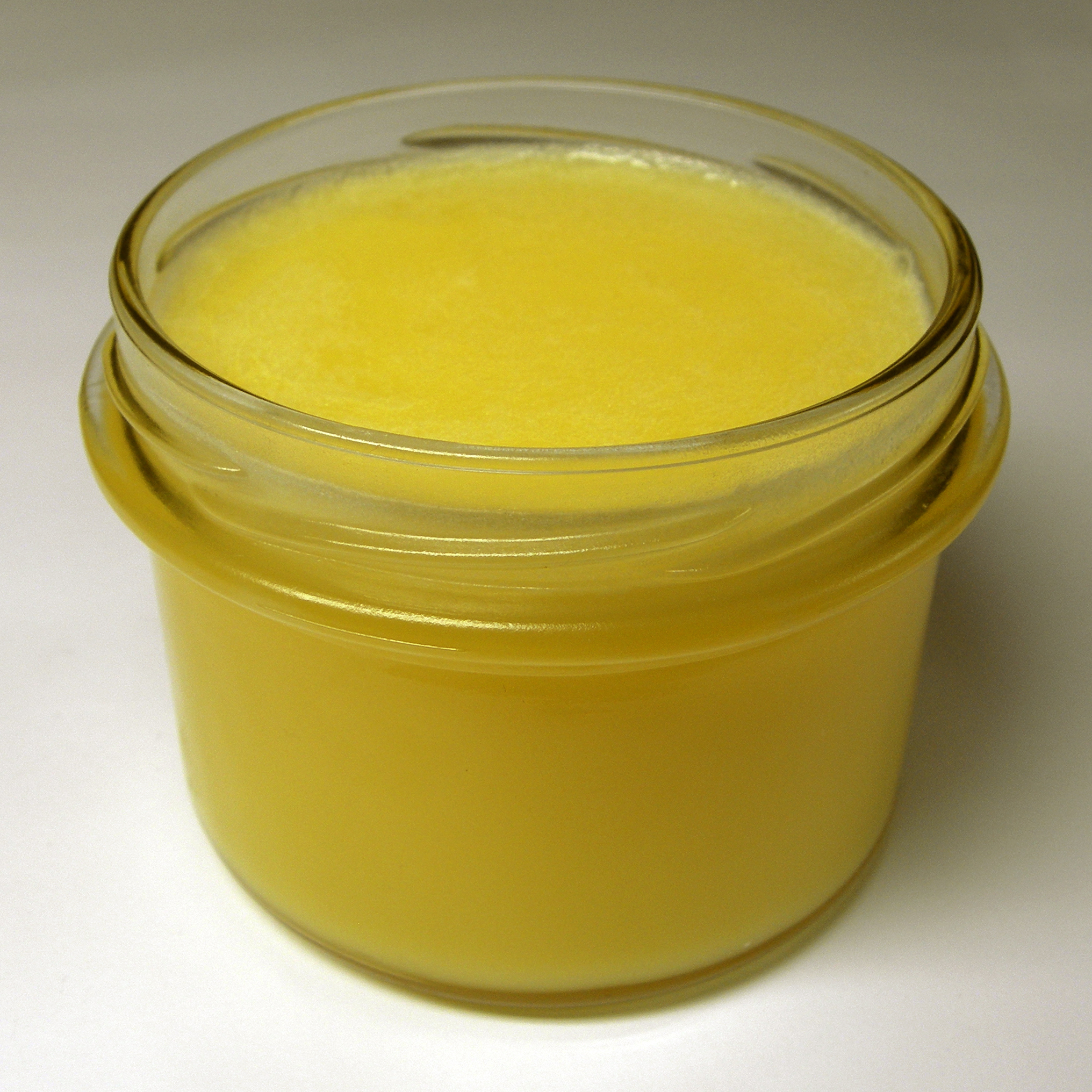
Clarified butter at room temperature

Clarified butter is butter from which all milk solids have been removed. The result is a clear, yellow butter that can be heated to higher temperatures before burning.

Typically, clarified butter is produced by melting butter and allowing the components to separate by density. The water evaporates, some solids (i.e. whey proteins) float to the surface and are skimmed off, and the remainder of the milk solids (casein) sink to the bottom and are left behind when the butterfat on top is poured off. It can also be separated with a separatory funnel or a gravy fat separator. This butterfat is the clarified butter.

Commercial methods of clarified butter production also include direct evaporation, but may also be accomplished by decantation and centrifugation followed by vacuum drying, or it may be obtained directly from cream by breaking the emulsion followed by centrifugation.

== Properties ==
Clarified butter has a higher smoke point (252 °C or 486 °F) than regular butter (163–191 °C or 325–376 °F), and is therefore preferred in some cooking applications, such as sautéing. Clarified butter also has a much longer shelf life than fresh butter because it does not have water and therefore is less prone to rancidity. It has negligible amounts of lactose and casein, and can therefore be consumed by individuals with lactose intolerance or casein allergy.

== Regional variations ==
In cuisine of the Indian subcontinent, ghee is made by cooking clarified butter longer during the separation process in order to caramelize the milk solids, resulting in a nutty flavor when they are filtered out.

In France clarifying butter was an ancient traditional means of preserving it, found especially in Normandy where butter was sometimes exported long distances. In Isigny the clarified butter was also called beurre fondu. Clarified butter is used in several traditional sauce recipes such as béarnaise and hollandaise sauces.

In some regions of Croatia butter was clarified (and called maslo) for better preservation at room temperature.

In Yemen there is a local custom where hot water is added to butter before clarifying it. The butter and water mixture is brought to a boil, then simmered with the addition of roasted wheat kernels, along with wheat flour or roasted and ground fenugreek seeds. After simmering, the mixture is strained to produce clarified butter. It may be stored in an earthenware container in a cool place; sometimes the containers are smoked to add flavor.

In Mongolia, ghee or "yellow oil" is widely consumed with traditional milk tea.

== See also ==
- Manteiga-da-terra, a Brazilian clarified butter product
- Niter kibbeh, a seasoned, clarified butter used in Ethiopian cuisine
- Schmaltz, clarified poultry fat
- Smen, a salted, fermented clarified butter, widely used in North African and Middle Eastern cuisines
