= Ghee =

Type of clarified butter from India

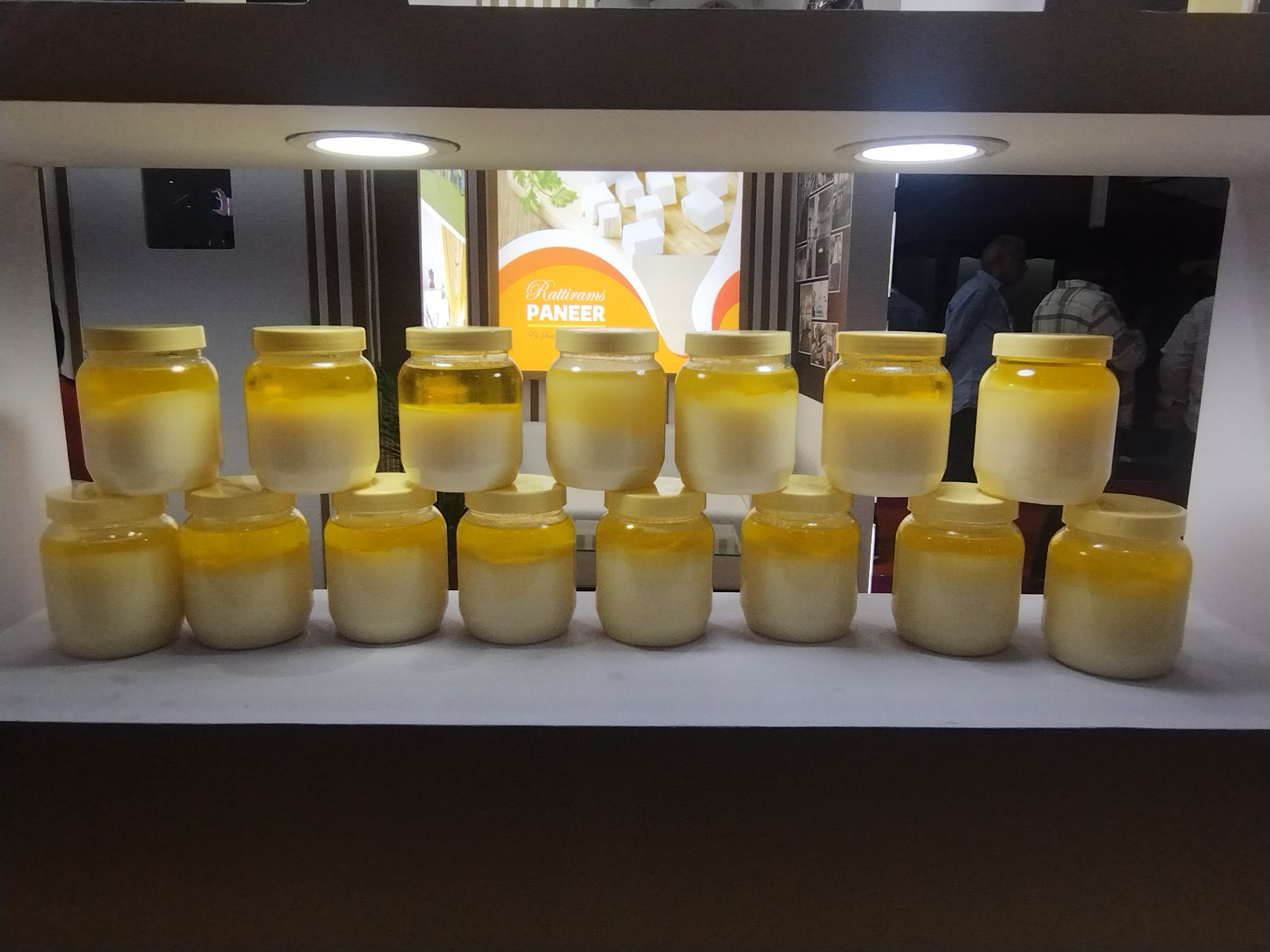
Ghee packaged in jars

Ghee (Sanskrit: घी, IPA: [ɡʰiː]; Nepali:घ्यू) is a type of clarified butter, originating in the South Asia. It is a widely used butter for cooking especially in South Asian cuisines and in Dharmic religious rituals. Typically made from cow butter or buffalo butter, ghee is favoured for its nutty flavour and high smoke point allowing it to be heated at high temperatures without burning.

== Description ==
Ghee is typically prepared by simmering butter, skimming any impurities from the surface, then pouring and retaining the clear liquid fat while discarding the solid residue that settles at the bottom. Spices can be added for flavour. The texture, colour, and taste of ghee depend on the quality of the butter, the milk used in the process, and the duration of boiling.

== Etymology ==
The word ghee is borrowed from the Hindi word घी (ghī), which comes from Sanskrit: घृत (ghṛta-, IPA: [ɡʱr̩tɐ]) 'clarified butter'; traditionally derived from the root घृ, ghṛ-, 'to sprinkle', and it is cognate with the Ancient Greek word χριστός (khristós, 'rubbed, anointed'), from which the English word Christ is derived.

In the Dravidian languages spoken in South India, ghee is referred to by terms likely inherited from Proto-Dravidian *ney 'oil, ghee': Tamil நெய் (ney), Malayalam നെയ് (neyŭ), Telugu నెయ్యి (neyyi), Kannada ನೆಯ್ಯಿ (neyyi). See Reconstruction:Proto-Dravidian/ney.

== Religious use ==
Traditionally, ghee is made from bovine milk, either cow or water buffalo, and has been used in rituals since the Vedic period. It is a sacred requirement in Vedic yajña and homa (fire rituals), through the medium of Agni (fire) to offer oblations to various deities (See: Yajurveda).

Fire rituals are utilised for ceremonies such as marriage and funerals. Ghee is required in Vedic worship of mūrtis (divine deities), with aarti (offering of ghee lamp) called diyā or dīpa and for Pañcāmṛta (Panchamruta) where ghee along with mishri, honey, milk, and dahi (curd) is used for bathing the deities on the appearance day of Krishna on Janmashtami, Śiva (Shiva) on Mahā-śivarātrī (Maha Shivaratri). There is a hymn to ghee. In the Mahabharata, the Kaurava were born from pots of ghee.

Ghee is also used in bhang in order to heat the cannabis to cause decarboxylation, making the drink psychoactive.

In Buddhist scripture, stages of dairy production are used as metaphors for stages of enlightenment. The highest-stage product, sarpir-maṇḍa, is theorised to be ghee or clarified butter.

== Culinary uses ==
Ghee is common in cuisines from the Indian subcontinent, including traditional rice preparations (such as biryani). In Maharashtra, polis or Indian flatbreads are accompanied with ghee. In Rajasthan, ghee often accompanies baati. All over North India, roti is served with ghee. In Karnataka and Tamil Nadu, ghee is provided alongside dosa and kesari bhath. In Bengal (both West Bengal and Bangladesh) and Gujarat, khichdi is a traditional evening meal of rice with lentils, cooked in a curry made from dahi (curd), cumin seeds, curry leaves, cornflour, turmeric, garlic, salt and ghee. It is also an ingredient in kadhi and Indian sweets, such as Mysore pak, and varieties of halva and laddu. Indian restaurants typically incorporate large amounts of ghee, sometimes brushing naan and roti with it, either during preparation or just before serving. In the state of Odisha ghee is widely used in Odia dishes such as khechedi and dalma. The sattvic food prepared in most temples in Odisha has ghee as a major ingredient in its culinary tradition. Ghee is used in South Indian cuisine for tempering curries and in the preparation of rice dishes and sweets. North Indians also add ghee to rice before eating it with pickles, dal and curries. North Indians are among the biggest consumers of ghee. Vegetarian dishes of Andhra Pradesh especially use ghee for the preparation of savoury and sweet dishes alike. Ghee is important to traditional North Indian cuisine, with parathas, daals and curries often using ghee instead of oil for a richer taste. The type of ghee, in terms of animal source, tends to vary with the dish; for example, ghee prepared from cow's milk (Bengali: গাওয়া ঘী, gaoa ghi) is traditional with rice, roti or as a finishing drizzle atop a curry or dal, whereas buffalo milk ghee is more typical for general cooking purposes. Traditionally, ghee (Bhojpuri: 𑂐𑂲𑂇, gheeu) in the Bhojpuri region is widely used along with mustard oil. Litti is usually served after dipping in ghee.

Ghee is a useful fat for deep frying because its smoke point (where its molecules begin to break down) is 250 °C (482 °F), which is well above typical cooking temperatures of around 200 °C (392 °F) and above that of most vegetable oils.

== Flavour ==
The main flavour components of ghee are carbonyls, free fatty acids, lactones, and alcohols. Along with the flavour of milk fat, the ripening of the butter and the temperature at which it is clarified also affect the flavour. For example, ghee produced at 100 °C (212 °F) or lower has a milder flavour, whereas 120 °C (248 °F) results in a strong flavour.

== Differences from clarified butter ==
The production of ghee differs slightly from that of clarified butter. The process of creating clarified butter is complete once the water is evaporated and the fat (clarified butter) is separated from the milk solids. However, the production of ghee includes simmering the butter, which makes it nutty-tasting and aromatic.

A traditional recipe for ghee is to boil raw milk and let it cool to 43 °C (109 °F). After leaving it covered at room temperature for around 12 hours, add a bit of dahi (yogurt) to it and leave it overnight. This makes more yogurt. This is churned with water, to obtain cultured butter, which is used to simmer into ghee.

Ghee, clarified butter
Nutritional value per 100 g
- Energy: 876 kcal (3,670 kJ)
- Carbohydrates: 0
- Sugars: 0
- Fat: 99.48 g
- Saturated: 61.9 g
- Monounsaturated: 28.7 g
- Polyunsaturated: 3.7 g
- Protein: 0.28 g
Vitamins and minerals
Vitamins	Quantity %DV^{†}
Vitamin A equiv.	93% 840 μg
Choline	4% 22.3 mg
Vitamin E	19% 2.8 mg
Vitamin K	7% 8.6 μg
Minerals	Quantity %DV^{†}
Calcium	0% 4 mg
Sodium	0% 2 mg
- Other constituents: Quantity
- Water: 0.24 g
- Cholesterol: 256 mg
- Link to USDA Database entry
- ^{†}Percentages estimated using US recommendations for adults.

== Nutrition ==
Ghee is 99.5% fat, 0.2% water, 0.3% protein, and contains no carbohydrates (table). The fat composition includes 62% of saturated fats, 29% of monounsaturated fats, and 4% of polyunsaturated fats (table). In a reference amount of 100 g (3.5 oz), ghee supplies 876 calories, 256 mg of cholesterol, vitamin A (93% of the Daily Value, DV), and vitamin E (19% DV), with no other micronutrients in significant content (table).

The British Nutrition Foundation, Heart and Stroke Foundation of Canada and World Health Organization advise people to limit or eliminate ghee in food preparation due to its high saturated fat content, using instead plant-based oils high in unsaturated fat, such as rapeseed, olive, or sunflower oils and spreads.

== Preparation methods ==
There are five common methods through which ghee is prepared. Industrial preparation on the other hand is done by using "white butter", usually sourced from other dairies and contractors.

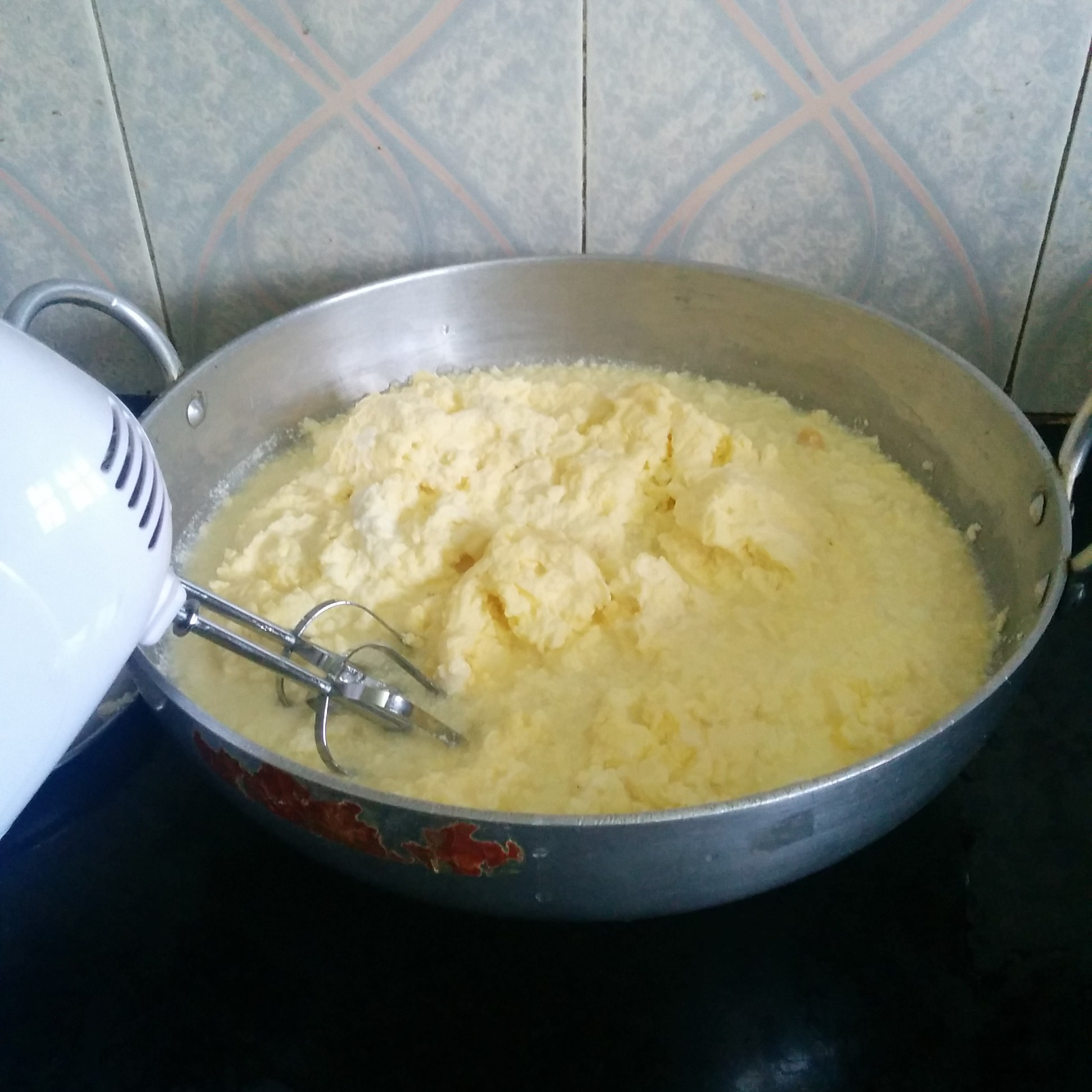
In the cream butter method, cream is separated from milk and churned to produce butter. The butter then undergoes heat clarification.

=== Milk butter ===
Sour raw milk is churned into butter. The butter is boiled in an open pan to allow the water to evaporate. The hot ghee is transferred and stored.

=== Direct cream ===
Fresh cream, cultured or washed cream is directly converted to ghee. This method requires a long heating time and produces a caramelised flavour.

=== Cream butter ===
Milk is separated into cream, which is then churned into butter. The butter undergoes heat clarification to produce ghee.

=== Pre-stratification ===
This method is suitable for large quantities of butter. Butter is melted at 80–85 °C (176–185 °F) for 30 minutes. Layers of protein particles, fat and buttermilk are induced. The buttermilk is drained out. The remaining layers of fat are heated to a temperature of 110 °C (230 °F) to remove moisture and develop flavour.

== Packaging ==
Ghee is generally packaged in airtight glass jars. The containers should be stored away from direct sunlight which can produce moisture inside the jar, reducing ghee quality and shelf life. Sealed jar storage is recommended at 4 °C (39 °F) or colder.

== See also ==
- Beurre noisette
- Chrism
- Manteiga-da-terra
- Niter kibbeh
- Smen
- Vanaspati - hydrogenated palm oil marketed as vegetarian alternative to ghee
