= Namak para =

Crunchy savory snack from India and Pakistan

Namak Paray
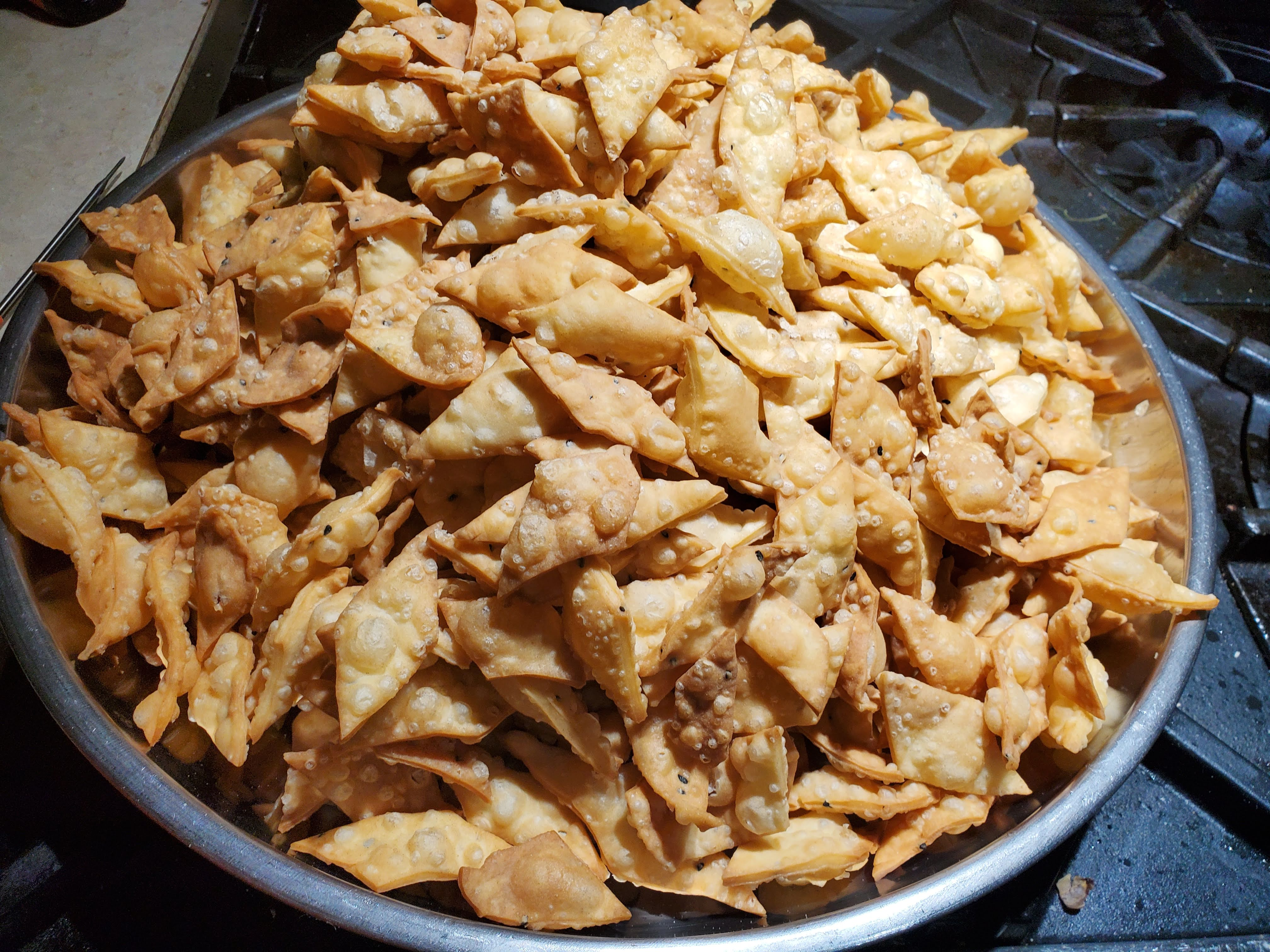
- Alternative names: Shankarpali, Tukkudi, Nimkin, Matar
- Type: Pastry
- Place of origin: India, Pakistan
- Region or state: North India
- Associated cuisine: Indian; Pakistan
- Main ingredients: Flour (whole wheat, refined, or semolina), cumin, carom seeds, and caraway seeds, ghee
- Variations: Shankarpali is the sweet version.

Nimki or Nimkin or Namkin, or Namak para or Namakpare is a crunchy savoury snack eaten originating from North India and Pakistan. It is similar to Mathri, a snack from Rajasthan. It has since become popular throughout the Indian subcontinent.

Namak para is ribbon-like strips of pastry (made up of refined flour, oil and water) delicately seasoned with ajwain and cumin seeds (jeera) in pure ghee (clarified butter) or any oil. It requires approximately 10 minutes to prepare and 20 minutes to cook. The appearance, taste, and texture can be compared to that of samosa pastry.

Other seasonings can be added to it as well, e.g. dried fenugreek leaves, dried mint leaves, etc.

The name derives from namak ("salt"), the main seasoning for the pastry, other ingredients include atta flour (whole wheat), maida flour (refined) or semolina and baking powder and baking soda.

== See also ==
- Shankarpali is the sweet version.
- Chakli
- Jhilinga, a similar Nepalese dish made from rice flour
- Mathri
- Murukku
