= Sandige =

Fried snack, originating from the Indian subcontinent

Sandige (or alternatively Shandige)
- Alternative names: Vadam, Vethal
- Course: Accompaniment, snack
- Place of origin: India
- Region or state: South India
- Serving temperature: Hot or cold
- Main ingredients: Rice, Sago, Wheat

Sandige (/ˈsʌndɪɡeɪ/), Vadam or Vethal is a fried snack, originating from the Indian subcontinent, popular in the south Indian states of Karnataka, Andhra Pradesh and Tamil Nadu. It is also served as an accompaniment with meals.

== Preparation ==
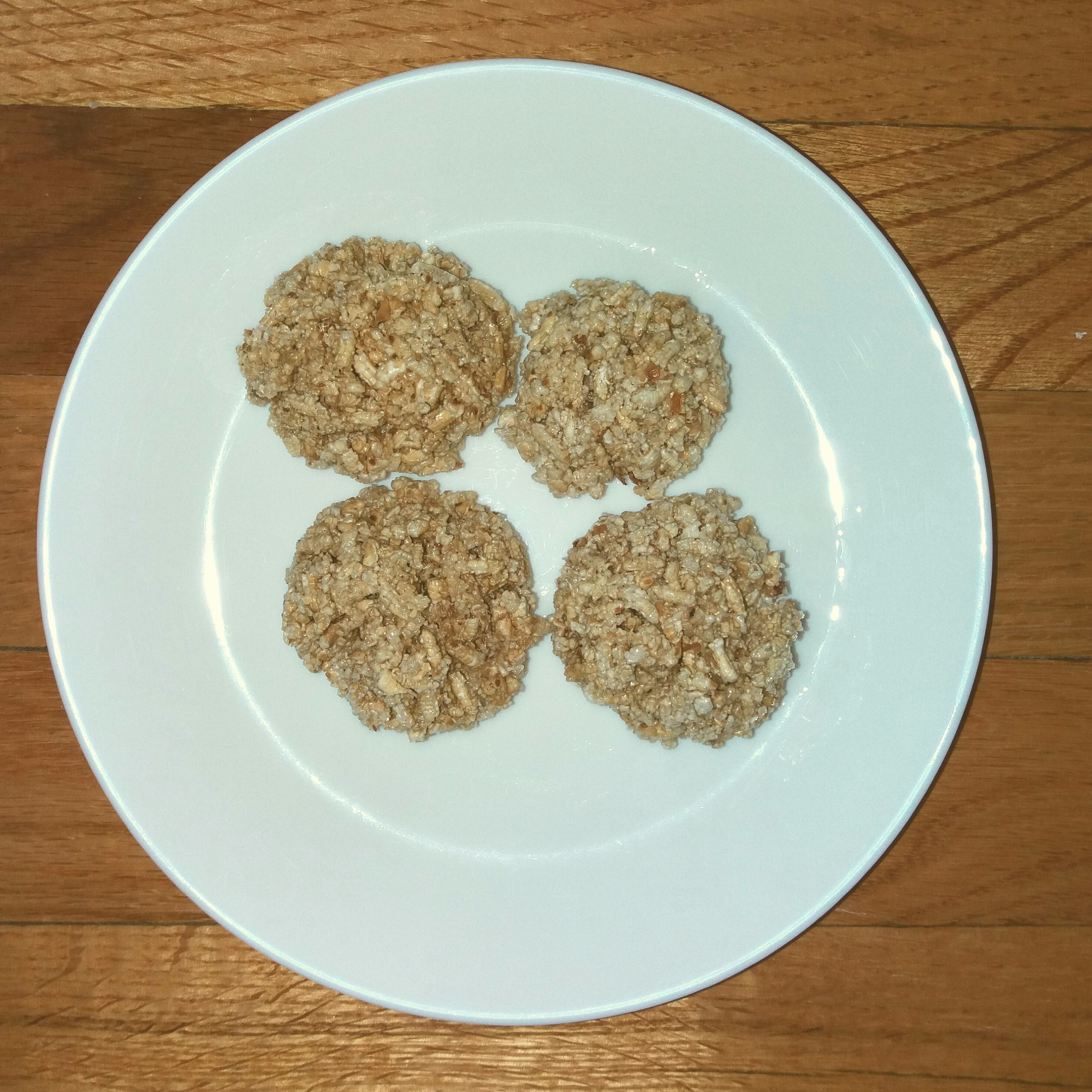
Aralu sandige

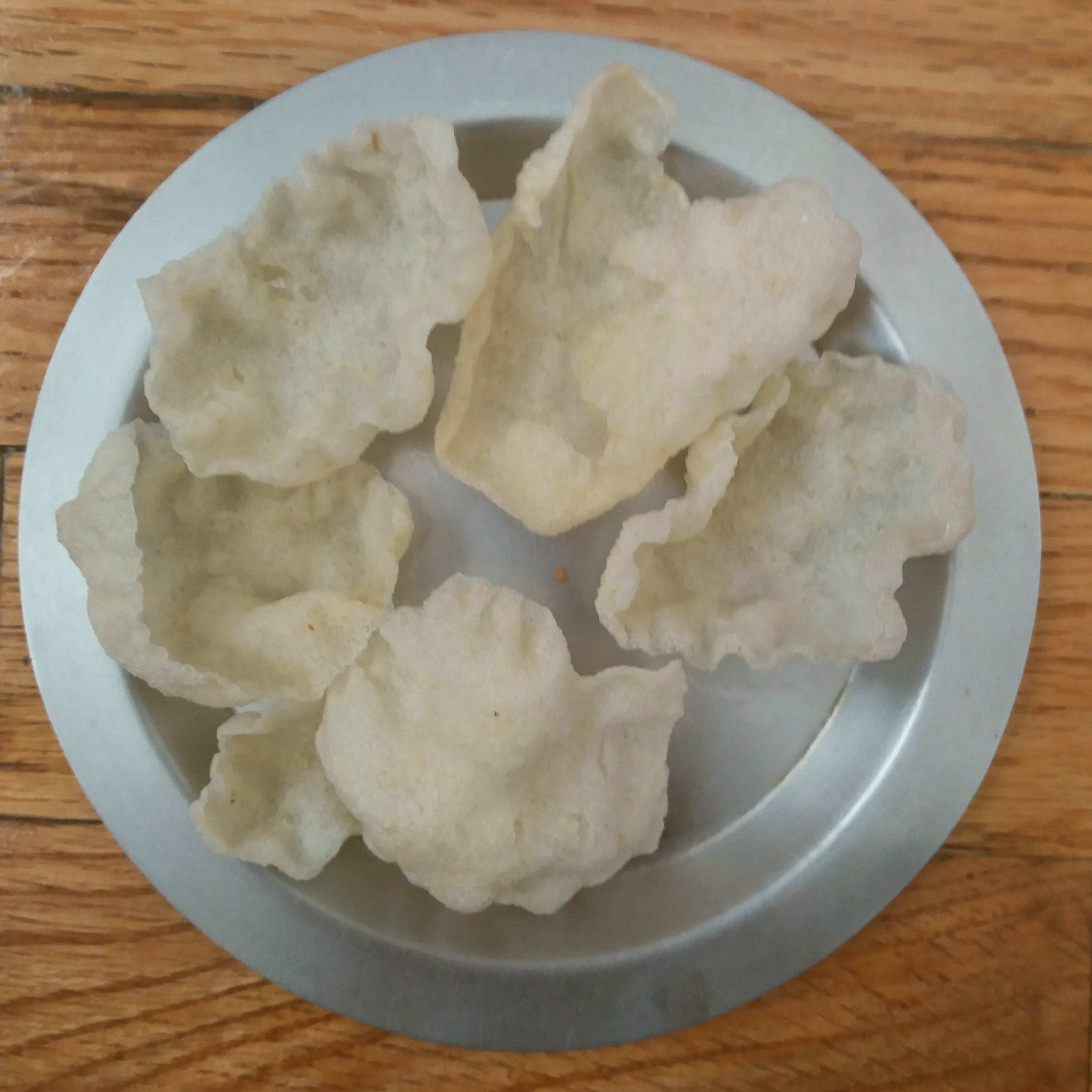
Sabbakki sandige

Sandige is prepared by making a gruel out of one of the main ingredients, either rice, wheat or sago, which is then spiced with asafoetida, green chili paste and salt. The warm vadam gruel is poured out in small portions with a spoon onto a plastic sheet or a large clean cloth and sun-dried for a couple of days.

To make aralu sandige and avalakki sandige, the main ingredients are added to the gruel and made into balls and sun-dried. Peni and avalakki sandige are made using chakli molds and extruders.

In the coastal region of Kerala, the Jackfruit (Chakka or Halasina) vegetable is used to make Chakkappalam or Happalas.

In South India, these sun-dried vadam and vethal sandige are made in large batches during the summer months as stock for the entire year which can then be stored in air-tight containers for long-term use throughout the year. They are deep-fried in hot oil before serving as an accompaniment to a Thali meal, or eaten as a snack.

== Types ==
Different kinds of sandige are listed below with their main ingredients:

- Sabbakki sandige - pearl sago
- Aralu sandige - popped rice and ash gourd
- Akki peni sandige - rice flour
- Avalakki sandige - pounded rice
- Godi peni sandige - wheat
- Nirulli Sandige - Onion
- Ragi Sandige - Finger millet

== See also ==
- List of crackers
- List of Indian dishes
- Papadum
- Jhilinga, a similar Nepalese dish made from rice flour
