= Thattai =

Thattai may refer to:

- Thattai (Indian food), a south Indian deep fried snack
- Thattai (instrument), an Indian percussion instrument
