= Mathri =

Rajasthani snack

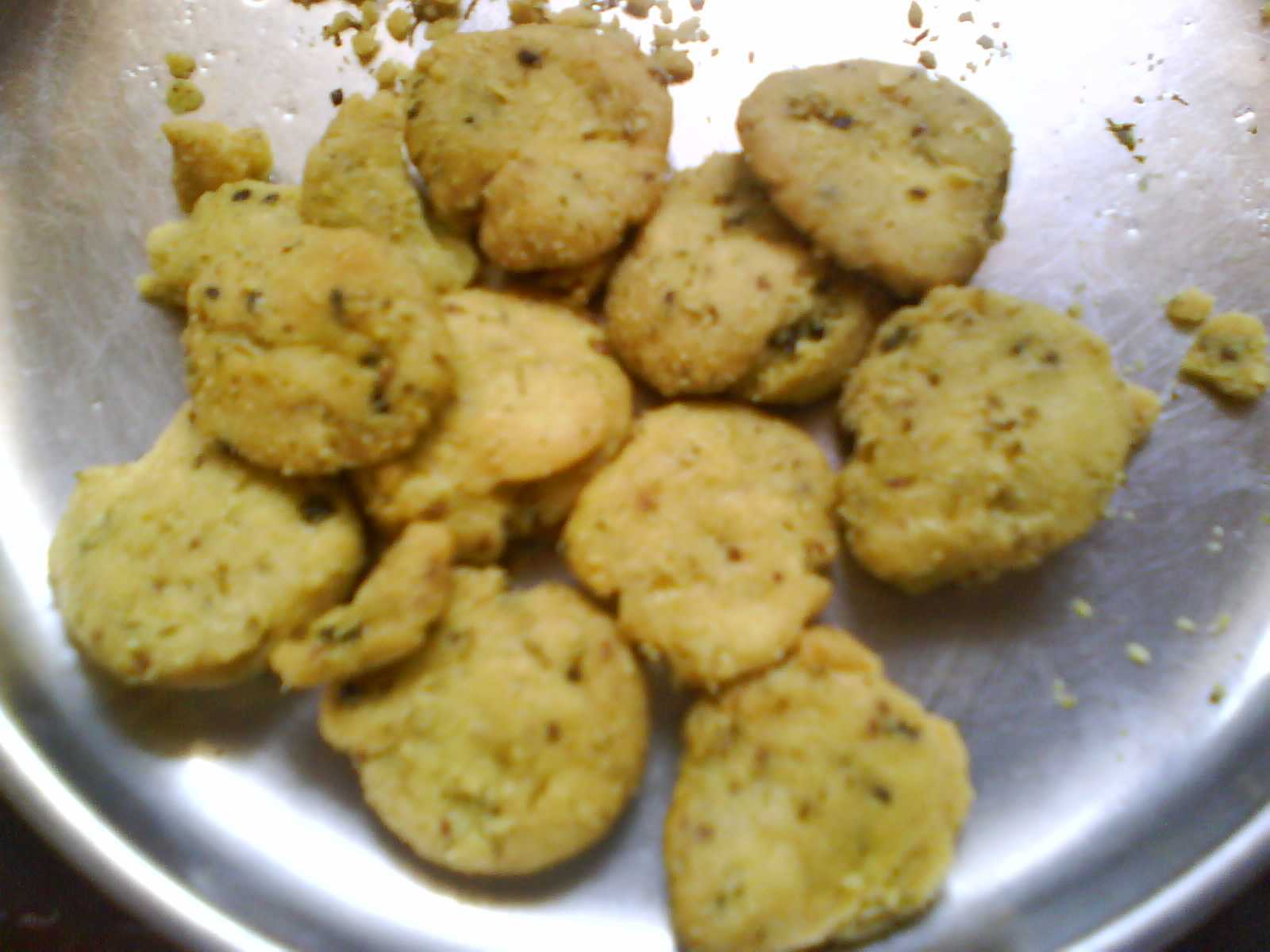
- Alternative names: Mathi
- Place of origin: India
- Region or state: Rajasthan
- Associated cuisine: Indian
- Main ingredients: Maida, semolina, dahi (yogurt), ghee
- Variations: Himachali kadhi

Mathri (Rajasthani: मठरी, Hindi: मठी, Mathi) is an Indian snack. It is a flaky biscuit originating from the north western Indian state of Rajasthan. Once a local delicacy, mathi or mathri as it's often called, is now available in sweet shops all over India. Similar to Namak para, it is made from flour, water, and, optionally, carom seeds. The creation of this snack was influenced by the need for food that would remain edible for days. The finished products are often stored in big jars at room temperature. Mathri is a popular snack to take along during travels.

Mathri is served with mango, chilli or lemon pickle along with tea. It is also served at weddings and poojas. Masala mathri is a variant of mathri with spices added to make it more crispy. Mathri is also available in different flavours, such as fenugreek leaves (methi), pickle (achari mathri), cumin (jeera) and masala (mixed spices).

It is one of the most popular snacks in North India, and is part of most marriage cooking or religious occasions like Karva Chauth and even as a tea-time snack.

== See also ==
- Namak para
- Thattai
