= Papadam =

Flatbread from the Indian subcontinent

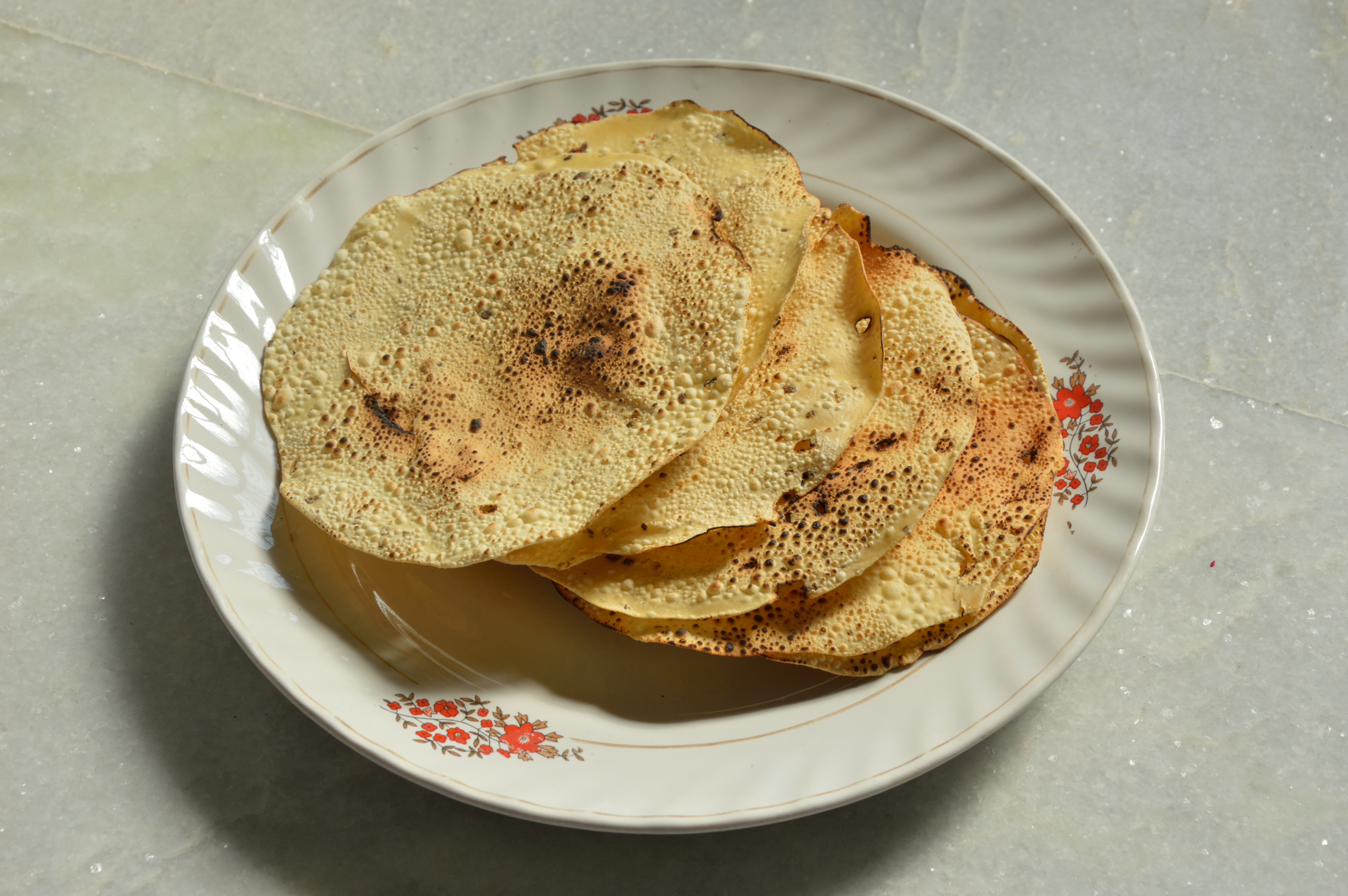
- Fire-roasted papadam
- Alternative names: Papad; papadum; poppadom; papar
- Course: Appetizer or side dish
- Main ingredients: Flour from lentils; black gram; chickpeas; potato; sago; rice
- Variations: Rice papad; tapioca papad; sago papad; potato papad; masala papad; garlic papad; ginger papad; jackfruit papad; chili papad

A papadam (Note: also known as a poppadom, papad, happala, papadom or papadum among other transliterations. IPA: [pɐpːɐɖɐm, paːpəɽ, hɐpːɐɭa]) is a snack that originated in the Indian subcontinent consisting of a dough of black gram bean flour that is either deep-fried or cooked with dry heat (flipped over an open flame) until crunchy. Other flours made from lentils, chickpeas, rice, tapioca, millet or potato are also used. Papadam is typically served as an accompaniment to a meal in India, Pakistan, Bangladesh, Nepal, Sri Lanka and the Caribbean or as an appetizer, often with dips such as chutneys, or toppings like chopped onions and chili peppers.

== Etymology ==
Papadam is a loanword from Tamil பப்படம் pappaṭam, and is likely ultimately from Sanskrit पर्पट parpaṭa borrowed from Prakrits, meaning a flattened disc described in early Jain and Buddhist literature.

== Regional variations ==
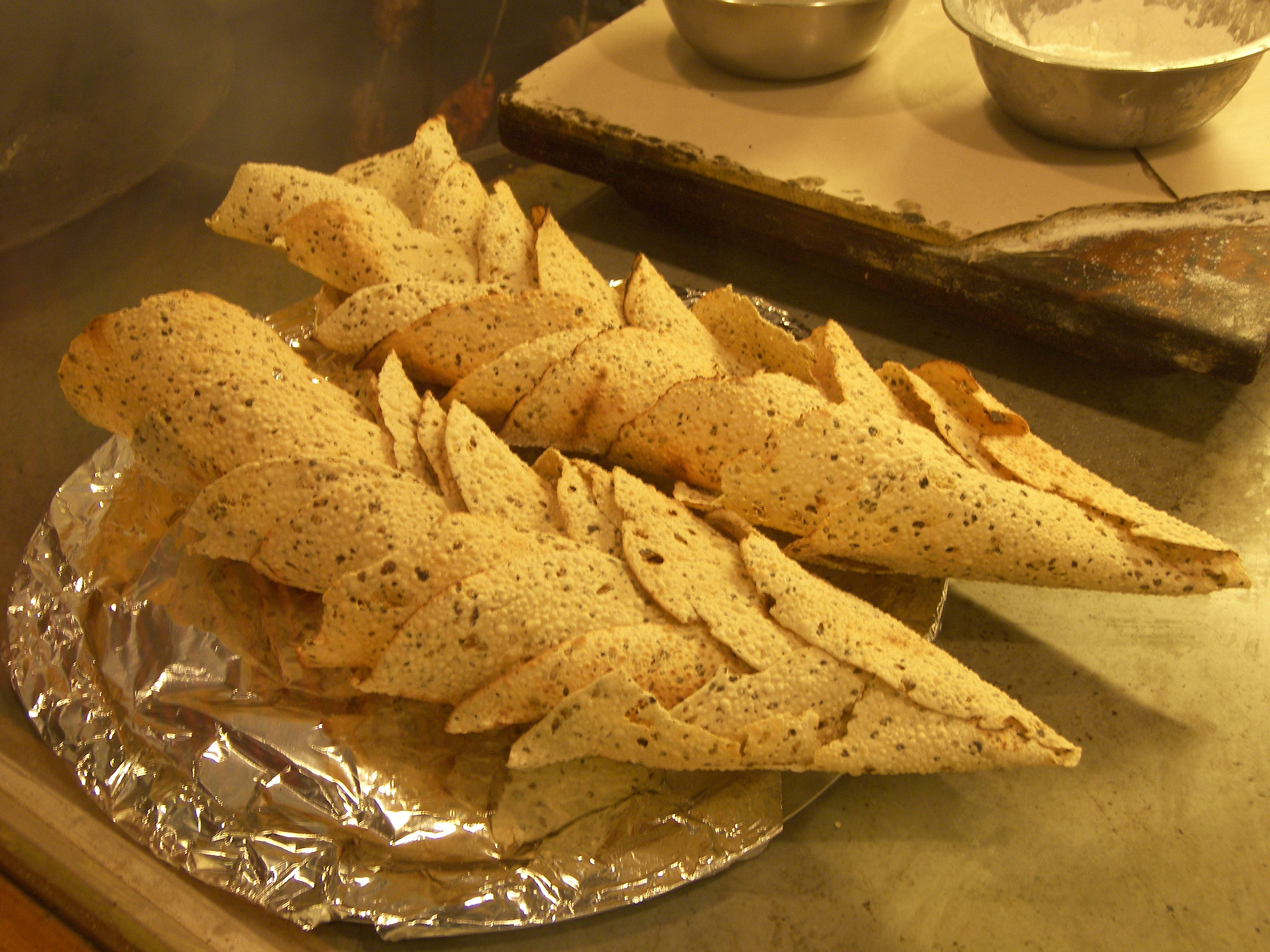
Jackfruit papadam from Bengaluru

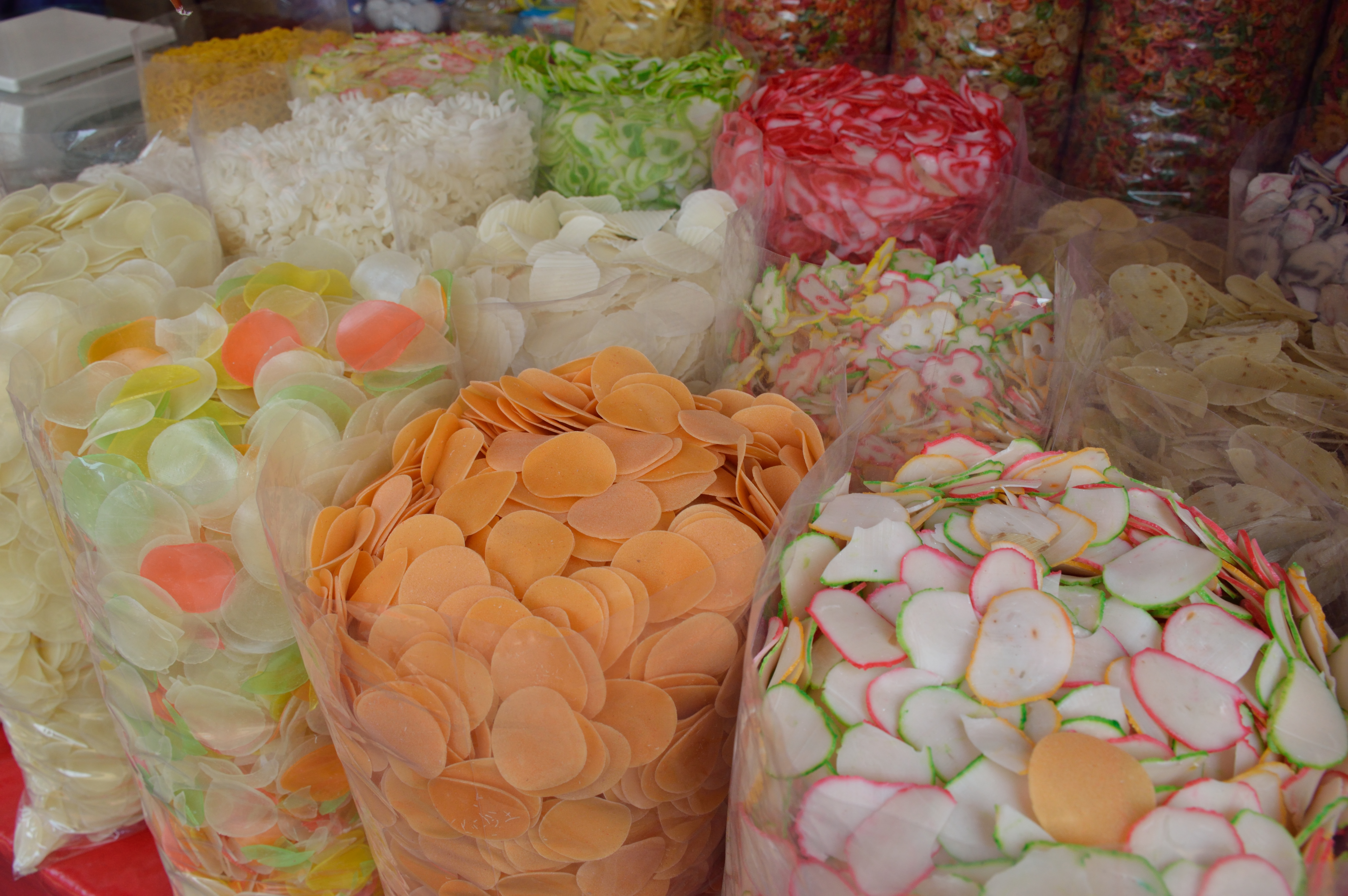
Different types are sold.

Papad recipes vary from region to region and from household to household. They are typically made from a flour or paste made from lentils, chickpeas, black gram, rice, or potatoes.

Salt and peanut oil are added to make a dough, which can be flavored with seasonings such as chili, cumin, garlic, or black pepper. Sometimes, baking soda or slaked lime are also added. The dough is shaped into thin, round flatbreads, dried (traditionally in the sun), and can be cooked by deep frying, roasting over an open flame, toasting, or microwaving, depending on the desired texture.

In most Indian restaurants around the world, they are served as an appetizer with dips, which often include mango chutney, lime pickle, onion chutney, and raita. Masala papad with sev, onion, tomato and coriander leaves is one of India's most popular appetizers.

=== Kappa pappadam ===
Kappa pappadam is a variety from the South Indian state of Kerala. It derives its name from its main ingredient of tapioca, which is known as "kappa" in Malayalam. It is also known as Maracheni, Cheeni pappadam/Appalam, and Cassava Papad.

The key ingredient, tapioca, is spiced with red chili, peppers, salt, cumin and asafoetida. The red chili is responsible for the characteristic brownish-orange color of kappa pappadam. Some variants appear white in color owing to the replacement of red chili with green chili.

The tapioca is diced and ground with chili, pepper, cumin and water to form a fine paste. This paste is further boiled with salt, asafoetida, coconut oil and more water till it thickens.

It is then spread out in circles on a cheesecloth or plastic sheet and is allowed to dry in the sun. Traditionally, a straw mat was used to dry the pappadams. After a few hours the pappadams are peeled and the sides reversed. After 2–3 days of good sunlight, the pappadams become crisp, indicating that they are ready to be fried.

The dried pappadams are then deep fried in oil and served. For those who wish to refrain from deep fried dishes, the pappadams can be coated with minimal oil and microwaved for one minute.

A 2017 film starring Fahadh Fazil is titled Kappa Pappadam, a reference to the snack and its culture.

== Ingredients and preparation ==
Papadam can be prepared from different ingredients and methods. One popular recipe uses flour ground from hulled split black gram mixed with black pepper, salt, a small amount of vegetable oil and a food-grade alkali, and the mixture is kneaded. A well-kneaded dough is then flattened into very thin rounds and then dried and stored for later preparation and consumption. It may also contain rice, jackfruit, sago, etc., as main ingredients.

Cracked black pepper, red chili powder, asafoetida, cumin or sesame seeds are often used as flavoring agents. Papadam is also made from rice flakes, ragi or horsegram.

== Gallery ==
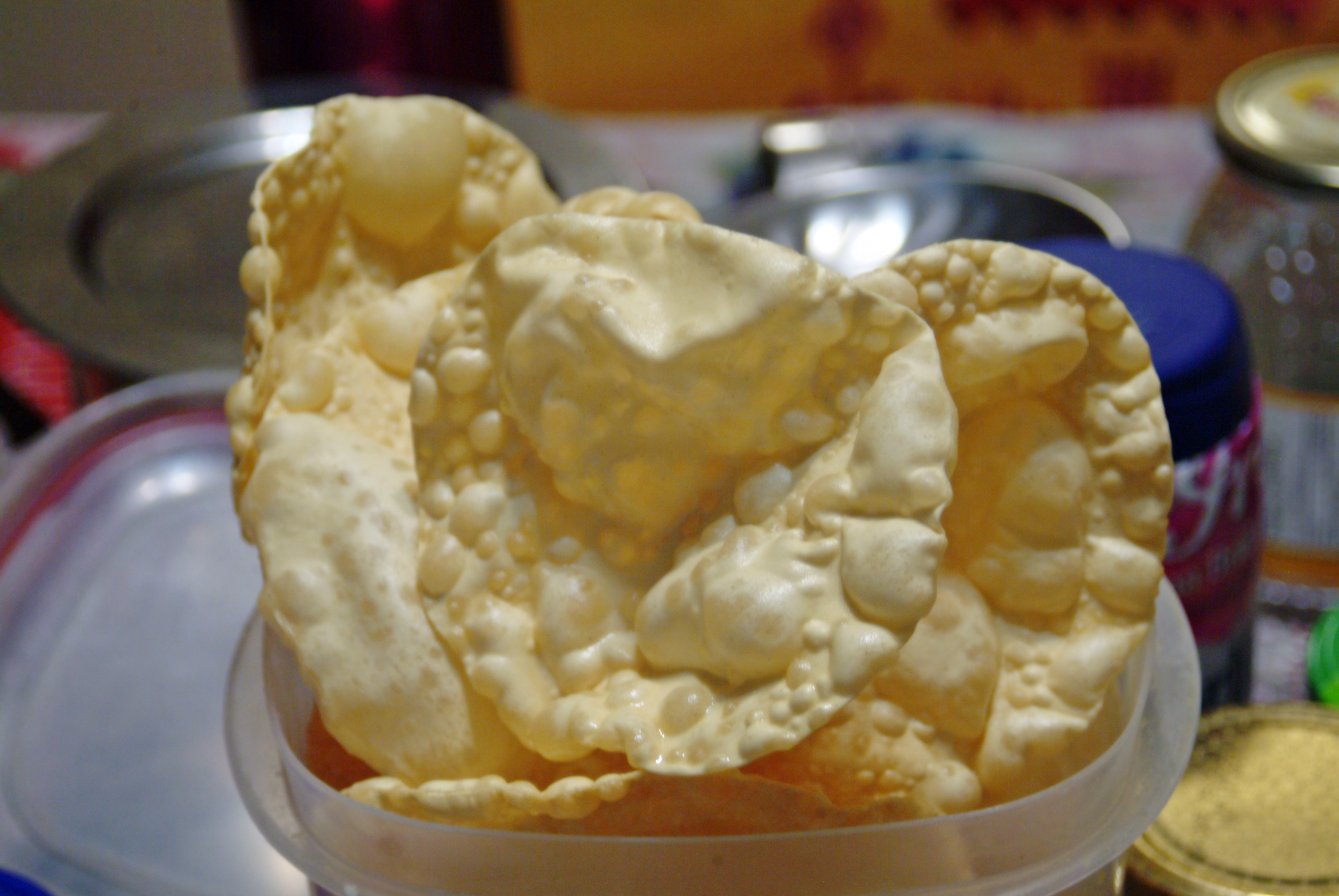
Pappadam

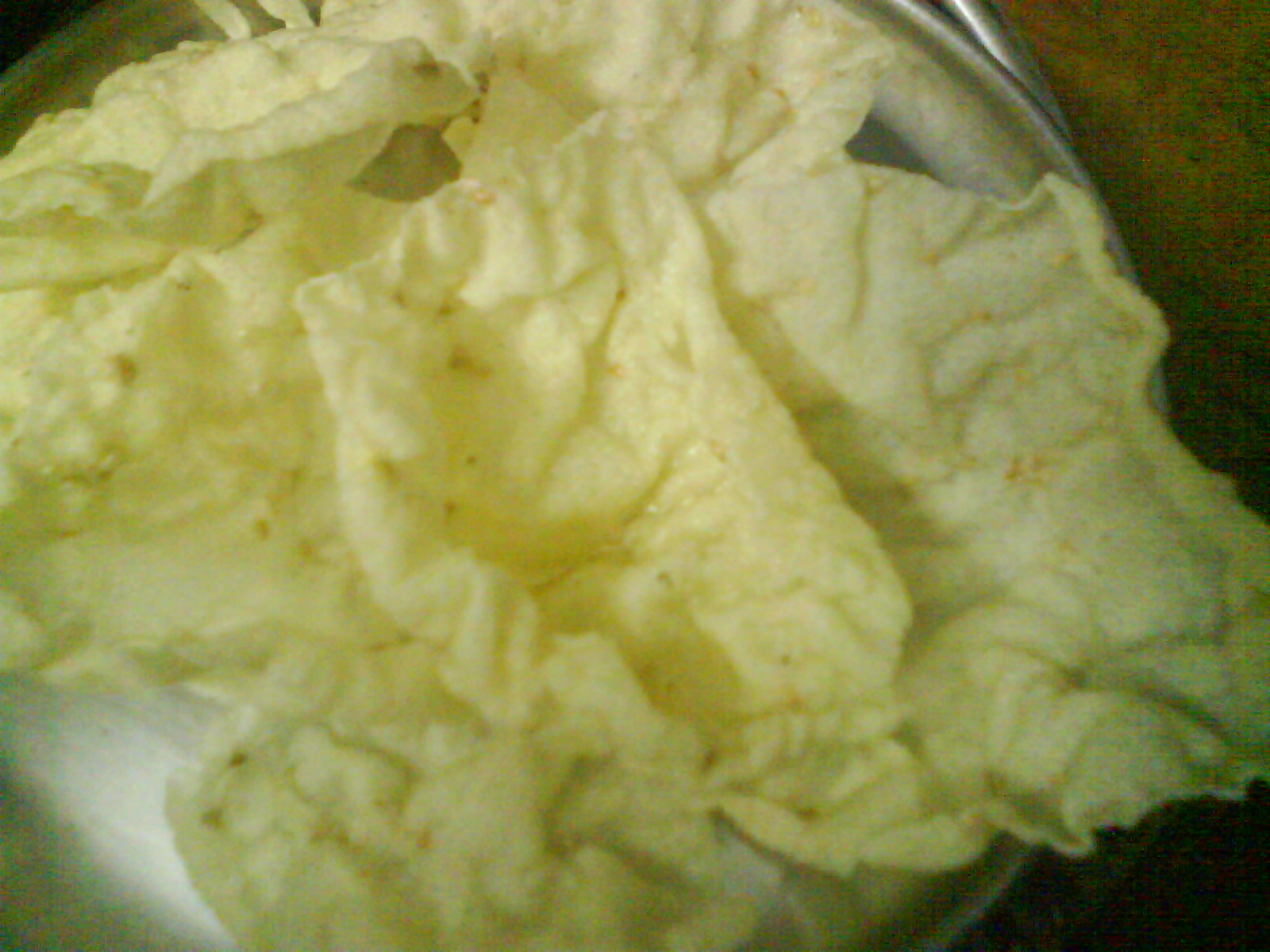
Rice papadam

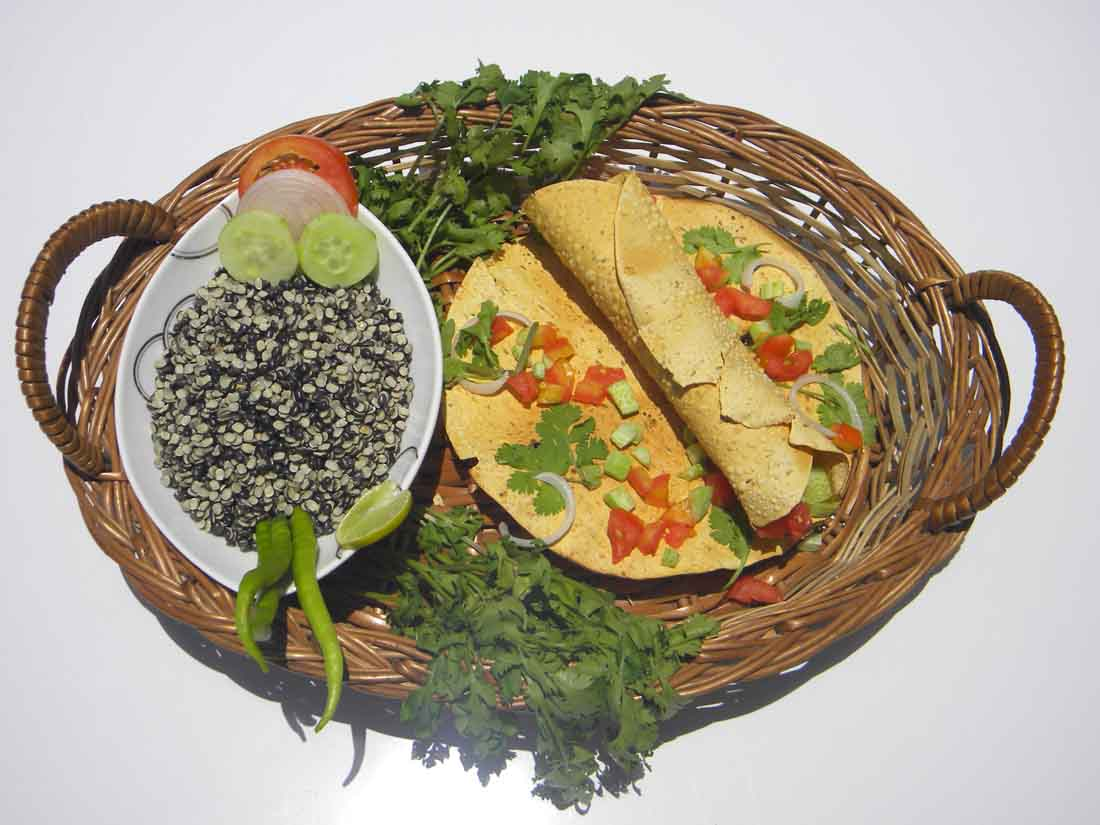
Uradal papadam

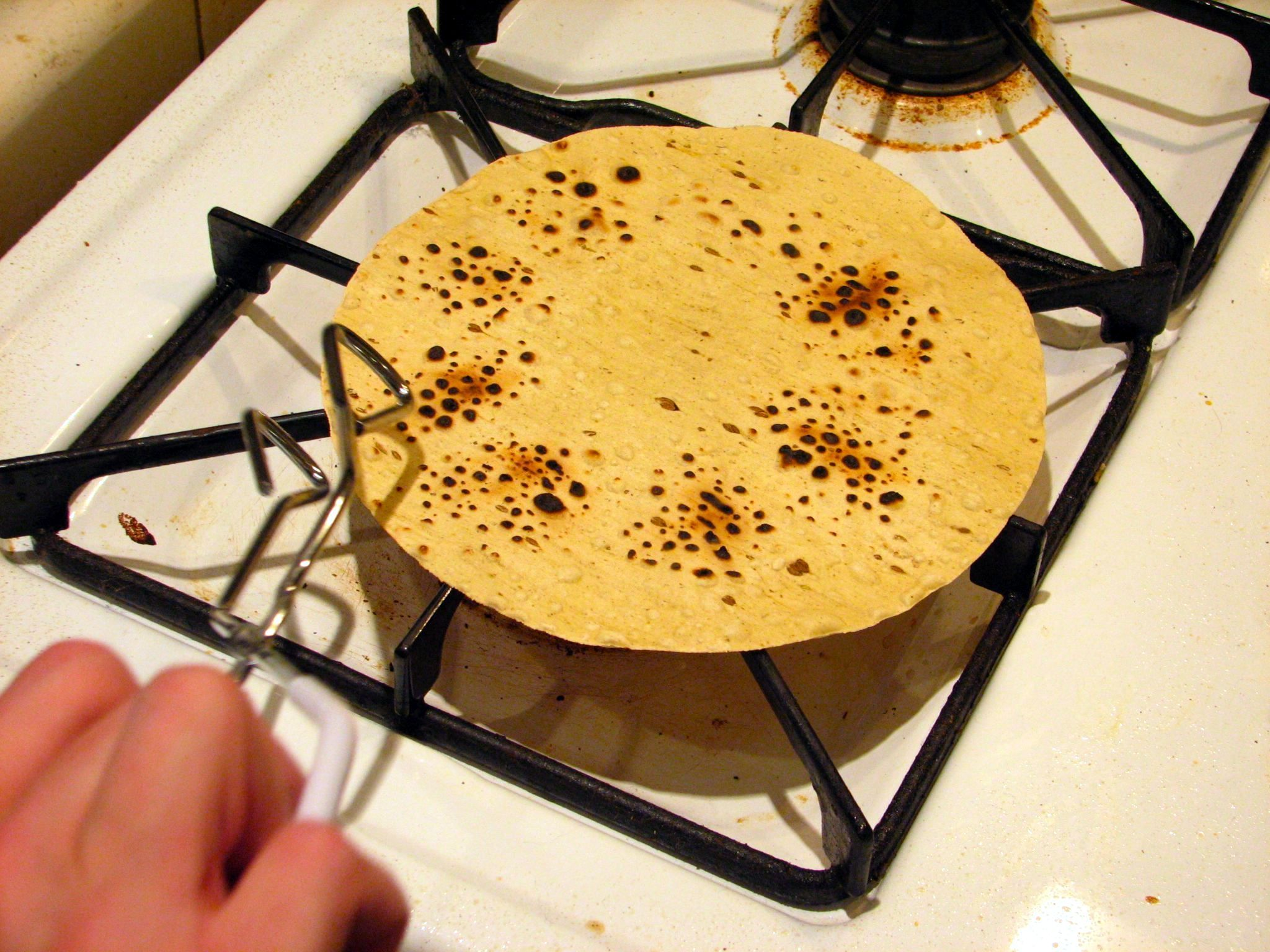
Fire-toasting papadam

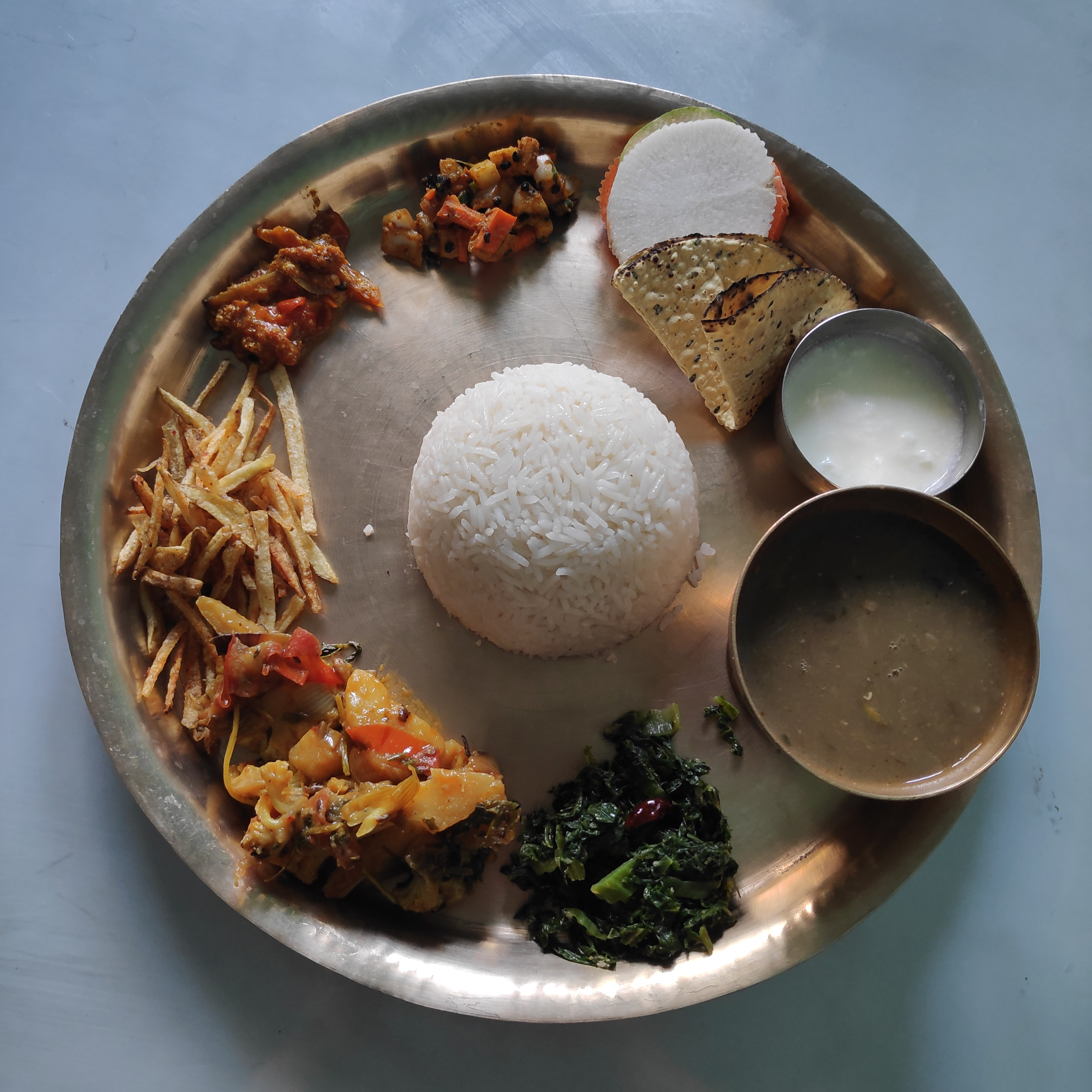
A Nepali thali with papad

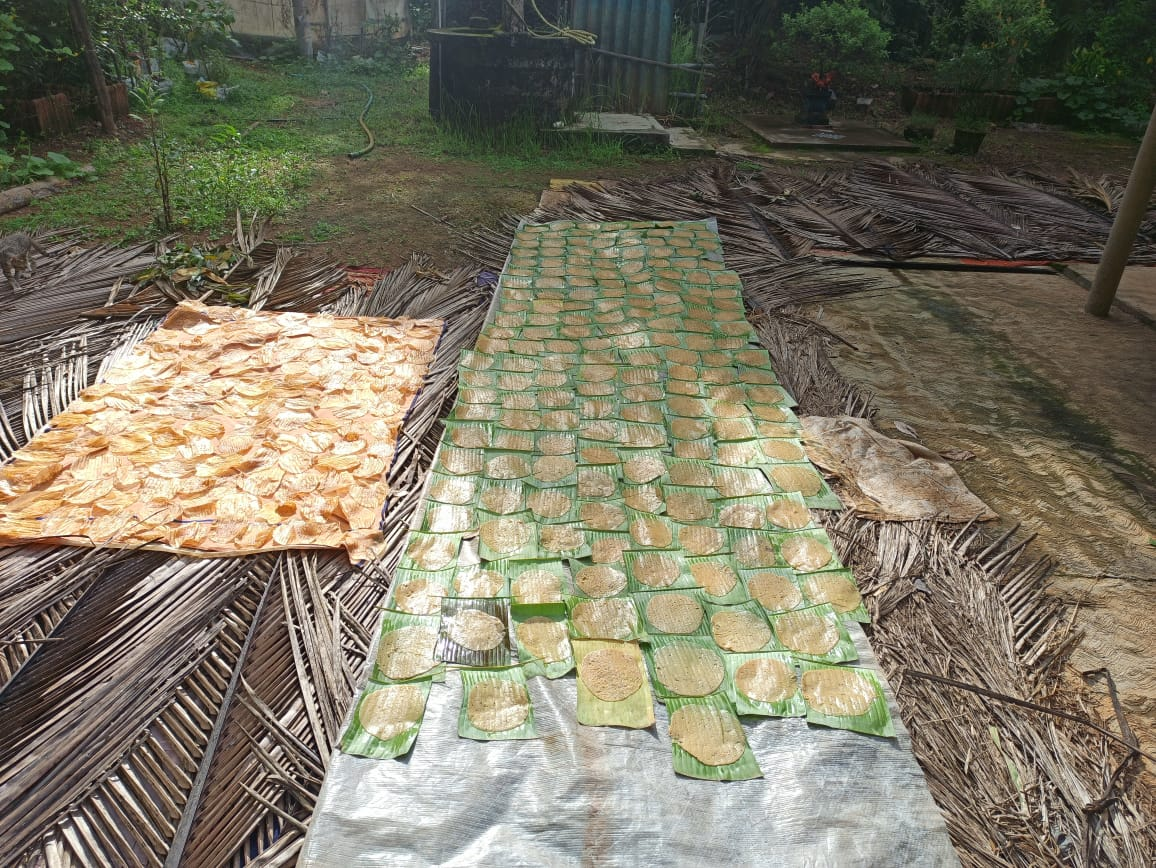
Raw jackfruit papad in coastal Karnataka

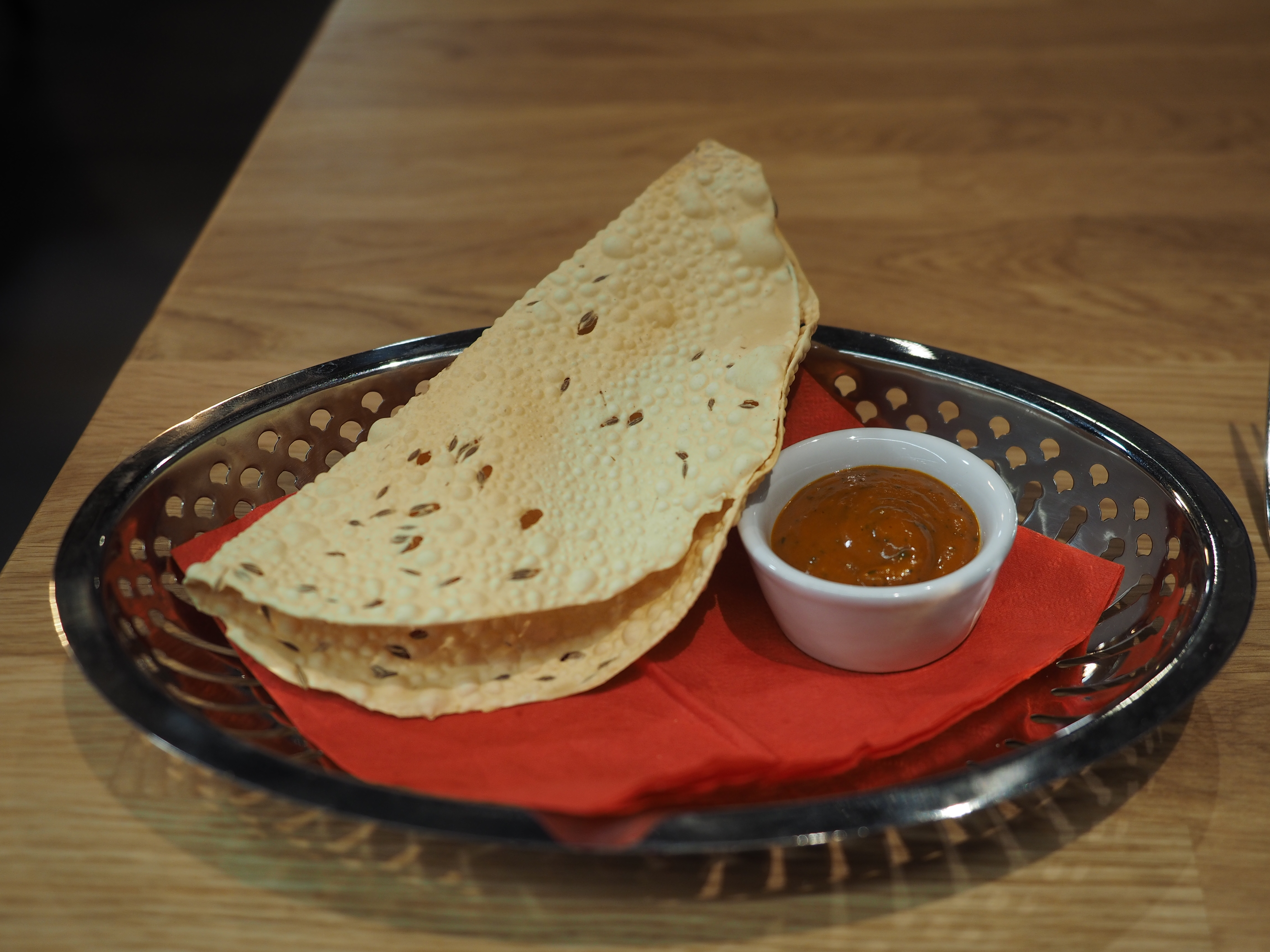
Papadam with chutney served as an appetizer at a South Asian style restaurant in Finland

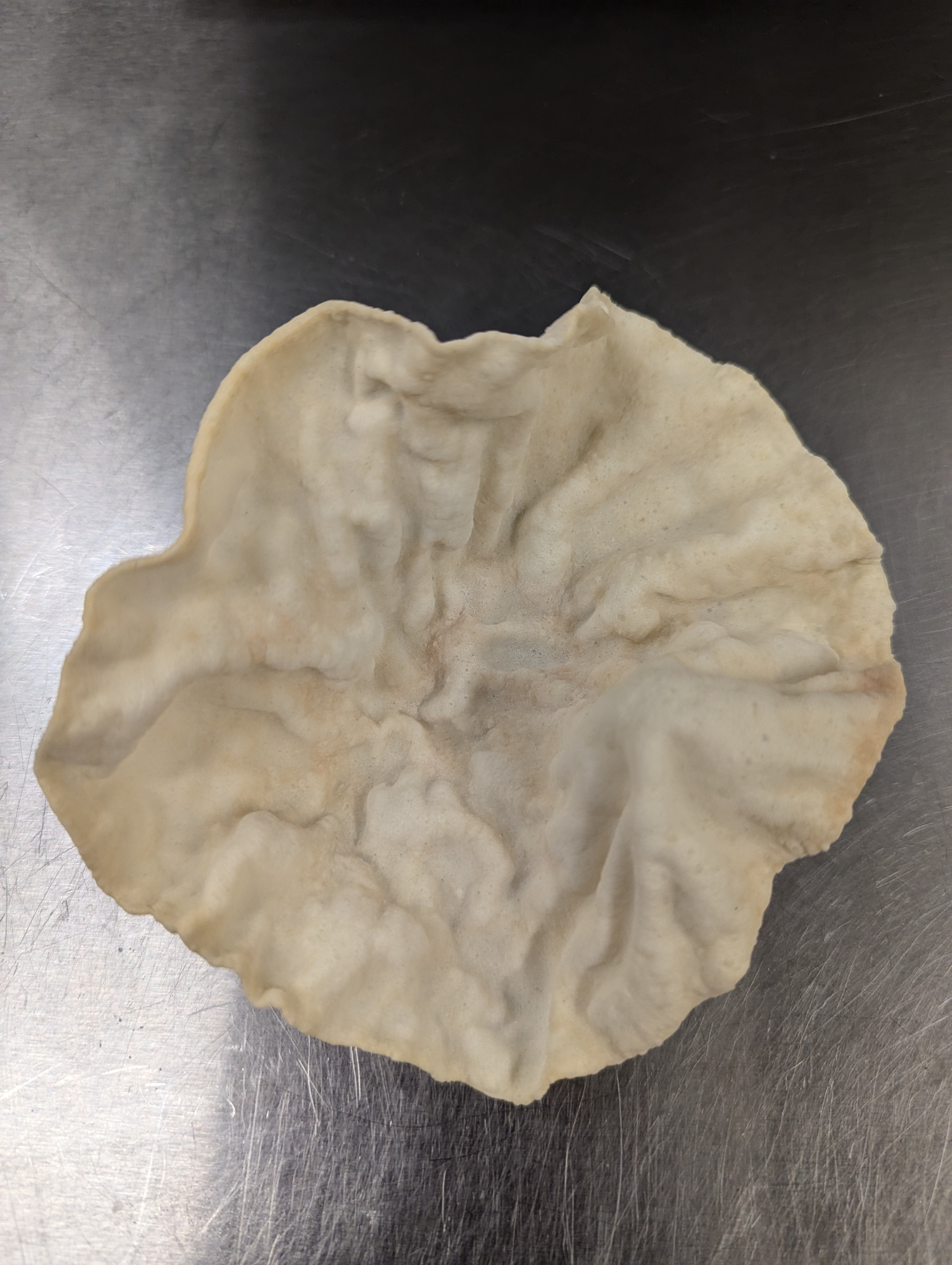
Microwaved papad texture

== See also ==
- Indian bread – Various flatbreads and crêpes in Indian cuisine
- Sandige – Fried snack, originating from the Indian subcontinent
