= Thattai (Indian food) =

Indian snack

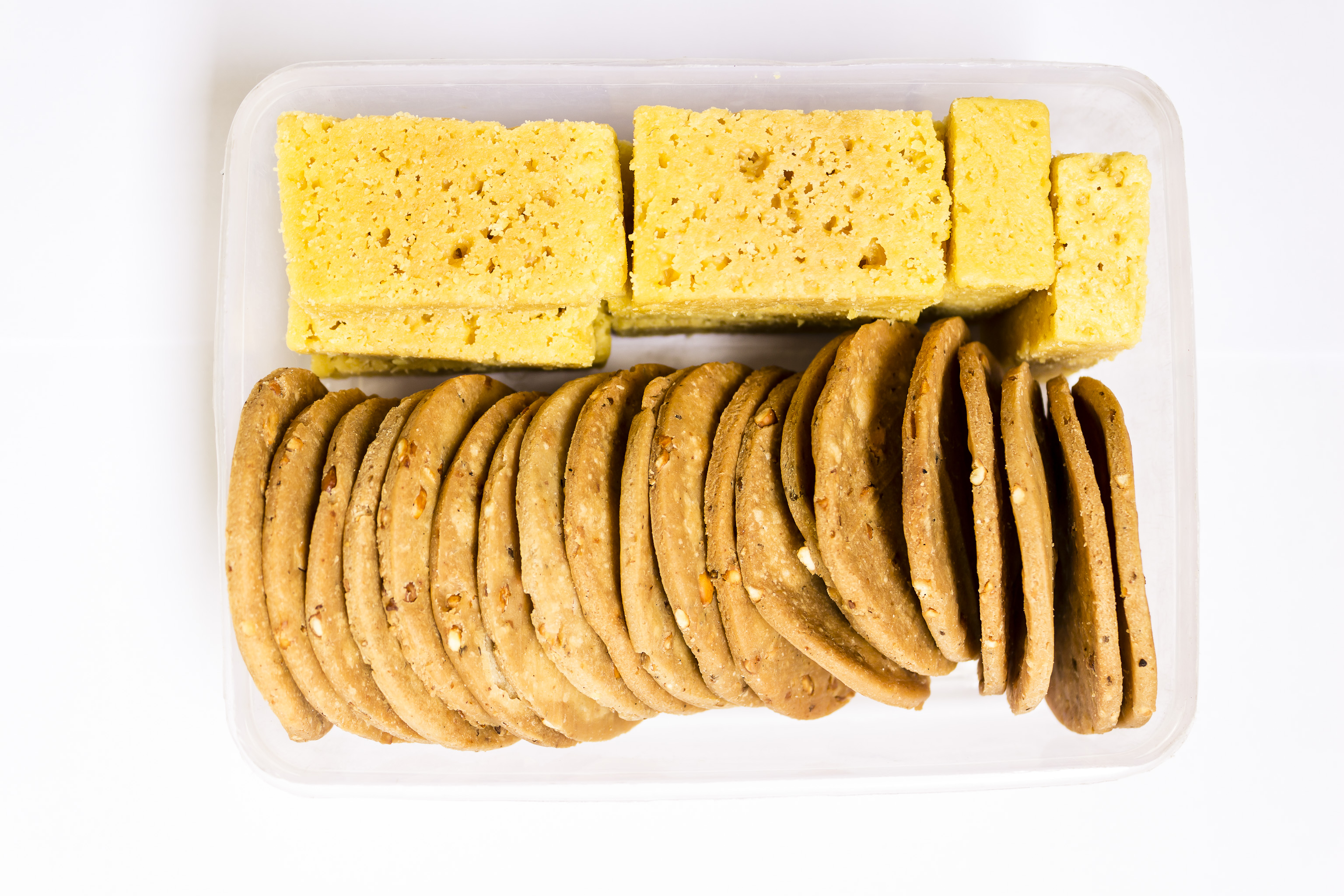
Thattai snacks on the bottom Thattai: Place of origin / India / Sri Lanka; Region or State / Tamil Nadu / Paruthithurai; Main Ingredients / Rice flour, Urad daal, fried gram, chana daal; Food energy (per serving) / 75 kcal

Thattai (Tamil - தட்டை) is a deep fried snack from Tamil Nadu, India made with rice flour and commonly prepared during Pongal and Deepavali festival. It can be salted or sweet. It is known as Nippattu in Karnataka and Chekkalu in Andhra Pradesh/Telangana.

== Description ==
Thattai is a popular snack from the southern regions of India and also in Sri Lanka. Typically made for festivals and holidays such as Krishna Jayanthi and Deepavali, this treat can also consumed throughout the year. The Thattai has been idolized to be the perfect snack during teatime throughout the monsoon seasons. Thattai can be bought in specialty sweets and bakery shops, but many choose to make the delicious treat at home. The process of making Thattai can be time consuming, but it is easy to make, especially when compared to other traditional snacks.

Thattai is disc-shaped and is also called Thattu (plate) Vadai. The physical description of the Thattai is to be flat, round, and 2 inches in diameter. It is fried until golden-brown. Ingredients can vary as the snack differs in texture and taste across South Indian regions. Thattai Vadai is also popular among the Sri Lankan Tamil community, where it is known as Paruthithurai Vadai, named after the northernmost Sri Lankan village Paruthithurai (also referred to as Point Pedro) where the snack originated.

== Ingredients ==
The typical ingredients are rice flour, urad daal, peanuts, fried gram, chana daal and other seasoning which are mixed in their respective proportions and deep fried in oil. It is available in various flavors including butter, ginger and masala.

== See also ==
- Mathri
- Namak para
