= Murukku =

Traditional snack of South India

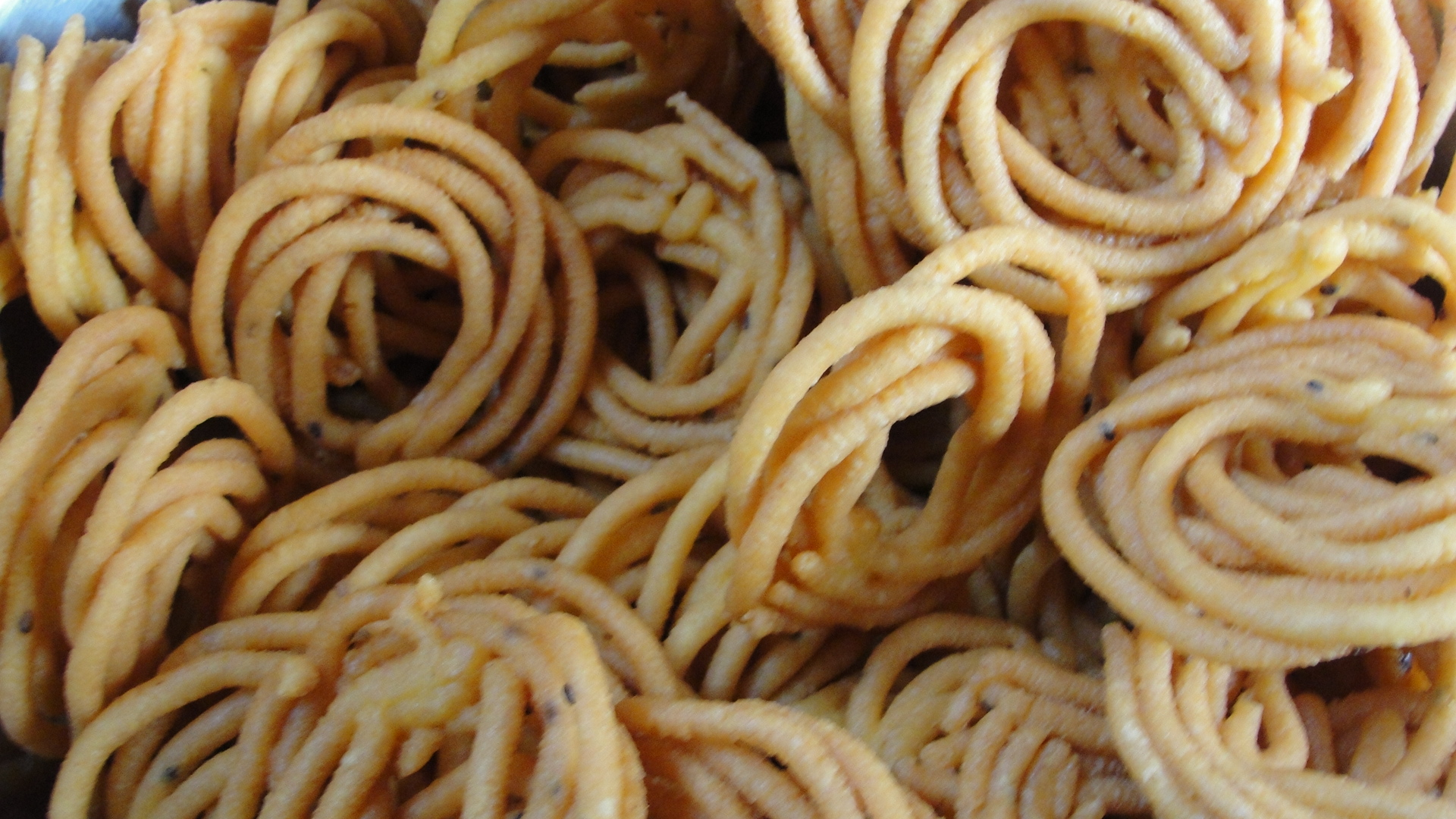
- Murukku
- Place of origin: India
- Region or state: India: Tamil Nadu, Karnataka, Kerala, Andhra Pradesh, Telangana, Chhattisgarh and Sri Lanka: Jaffna, Batticaloa
- Associated cuisine: India, Sri Lanka, Fiji
- Main ingredients: Rice flour, urad dal flour (black gram), salt, vegetable oil

Muṟukku (Tamil: முறுக்கு, romanised: muṟukku, lit. 'twisting') is a savoury, crunchy snack originating from the Indian subcontinent. In India, murukku is especially common in the states of Tamil Nadu, Telangana, Andhra Pradesh, Karnataka, Kerala, Chhattisgarh and Odisha. It is called murkulu in Telangana, janthikalu in Andhra Pradesh and mudku/murku in Odisha. Chakli is a similar Indian dish, typically made with an additional ingredient, chickpea flour.

It is also common in countries with substantial Indian and Sri Lankan diaspora communities, including Singapore, Fiji, Malaysia, and Myanmar. Called sagalay gway (စာကလေးခွေ; lit. 'baby sparrow coils') in Burmese, it is a common snack and is used as a topping for a regional dish called Dawei mont di.

== Etymology ==
The name muṟukku "twisting" in Tamil refers to its shape. Other names of the dish include Kannada: ಚಕ್ಕುಲಿ, romanised: cakkuli, Odia: ଦାନ୍ତକଲି, romanised: dāntakali, Marathi: चकली, romanised: cakalī, Telugu: చక్రాలు, romanised: cakrālu or murukulu or జంతికలు jantikalu, and Konkani: chakri or chakkuli.

== Ingredients and preparation ==
Murukku preparation

Murukku is typically made from rice flour and urad dal flour. The flours are mixed with water, salt, chili powder, asafoetida and either sesame seeds or cumin seeds. The mix is kneaded into a dough, which is shaped into spiral or coil shapes either by hand or extruded using a mould. The spirals are then deep-fried in vegetable oil.

== Variants ==
The dish has many variations, resulting from the types and proportions of flours used. Mullu muṟukku "thorn muṟukku" has an uneven texture that gives it an extra crunch. The Kai murukku "hand murukku") is made by hand using a stiffer dough. Ribbon pakoda muṟukku is another ribbon-shaped variety of the snack. Āṭṭaiyāmpaṭṭi kai muṟukku, a town in Tamil Nadu, is known for its unique variety of murukkus, known as Maṇappāṟai muṟukku. This gained popularity because of Krishnan Iyer, who prepared and sold this first in Maṇappāṟai. In 2010, the Tamil Nadu government applied for a geographical indication tag for Manapparai Murukku.

=== List of distinctive murukku varieties ===
- Kai murkku (Hand-woven murkku)
- Manapparai murukku (Manapparai – the place of origin of this variety)
- Mullu murukku or Magizhampoo murukku
- Thenkuzhal murukku (Skinny murukku)
- Oosi thenkuzhal murukku (Needle murukku)
- Thengaaippaal murukku (Coconut milk murukku )
- Godhumai murukku (Wheat murukku)
- Kaara murukku (Spicy murukku)
- Poondu murukku (Garlic murukku)
- Inji murukku (Ginger murukku)
- Meen murukku (Fish-thorn shaped murukku)
- Vattaurulai murukku (Ring murukku)
- Vennai murukku (Butter murukku)
- Kadalai murukku (Gram flour murukku)
- Verkkadalai murukku (Peanut murukku)
- Arisi murukku (Rice murukku)
- Achhu murukku or Achchappam (Sweet murukku)
- Karuppatti achchu murukku (Jaggery murukku)
- Pudhina Murukku (Mint murukku)
- Ezhumichai murukku (Lemon murukku)
- Kelvaragu or aarya murukku (Finger millet murukku)
- Kambu murukku (Pearl millet murukku)
- Chola murukku (Sorghum murukku)
- Makkacchola murukku (Maize murukku)
- Thinai murukku (Foxtail millet murukku)
- Ulundhu murukku (Vigna mungo murukku)
- Ellu murukku (Sesame murukku)
- Varagarisi or varagu murukku (Paspalum scrobiculatum murukku)
- Thirunelveli manoharam
- Urulaikkizhangu murkku (Potato murukku)
- Nei murukku (Ghee murukku)
- Ravai murukku (Semolina murukku)
- Pulungal arisi murukku (Parboiled rice murukku)
- Vengaaya murukku (Onion murukku)
- Milagu murukku (Black pepper murukku)
- Thakkaali murukku (Tomato murukku)
- Karuveppillai murukku (Curry leave murukku)
- Maida murukku (Maida murukku)
- Pulipu Murukku (Yoghurt murukku)
- Aval murukku (Flattened rice murukku)
- Mundhiri murukku (Cashew murukku)
- Baadhaam murukku (Almond murukku)
- Seeraga murukku (Cumin murukku)
- Murungai murukku (Moringa oleifera murukku)
- Paalakkeerai murukku (Spinach murukku)
- Vendhaya murukku (Fenugreek murukku)
- Pulichakkeerai murukku (Gongura murukku)
- Savvarisi murukku (Sago murukku)
- Panai murukku (palm murukku)
- Omapodi murukku (Caraway seeds murukku)

== Gallery ==
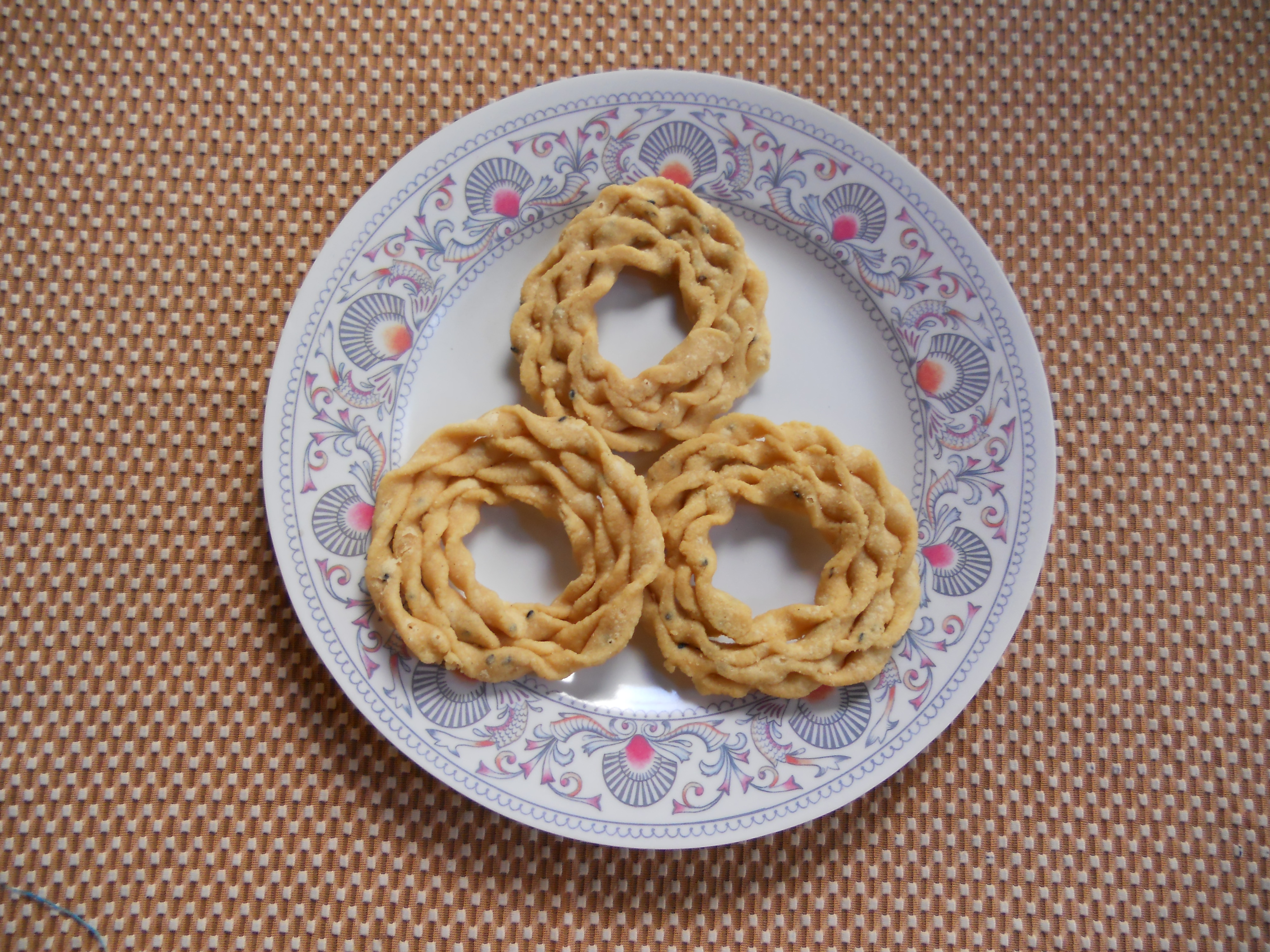
Kai (hand-prepared) Murukkus

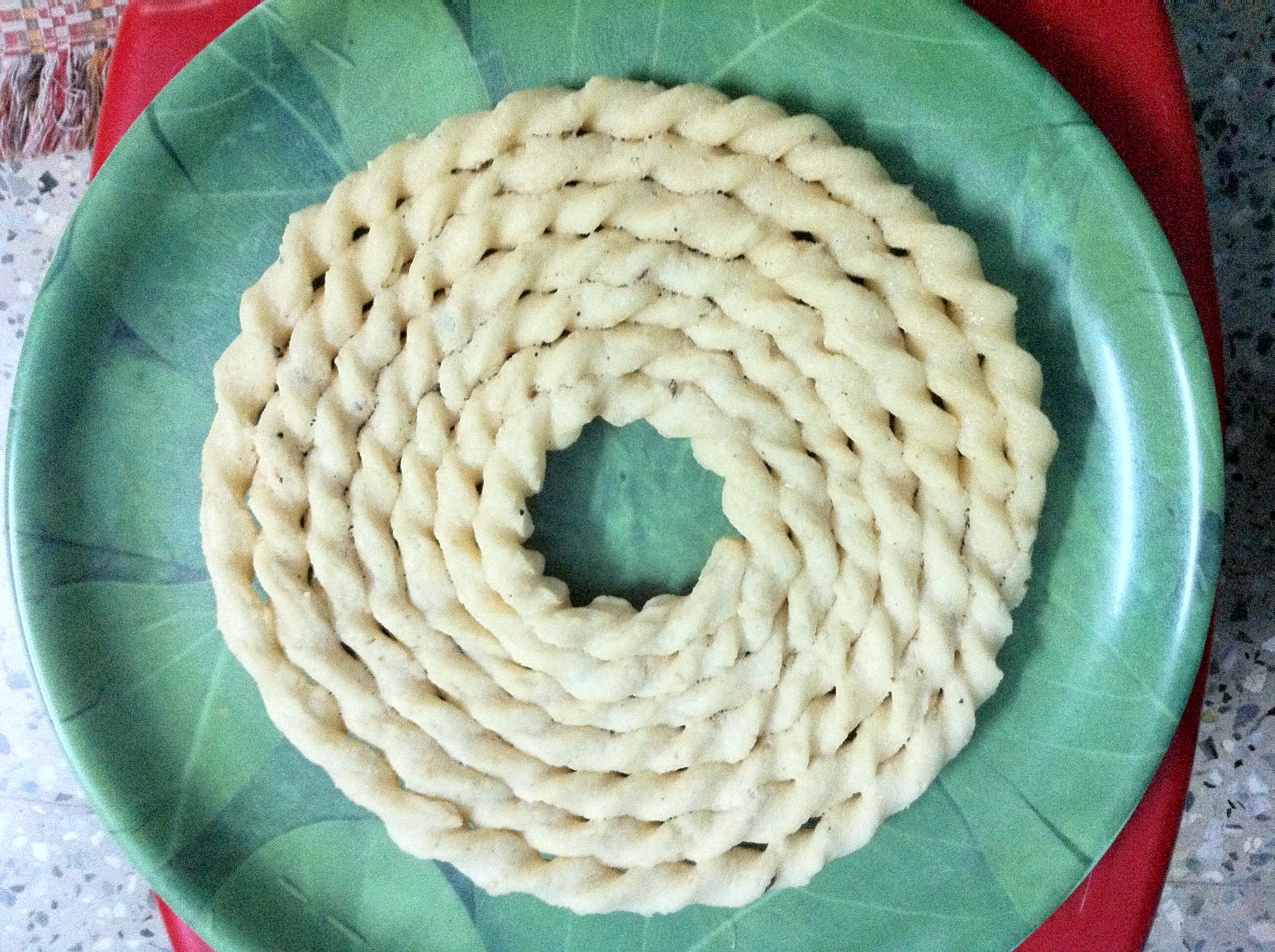
A larger variety of Kai Murukku

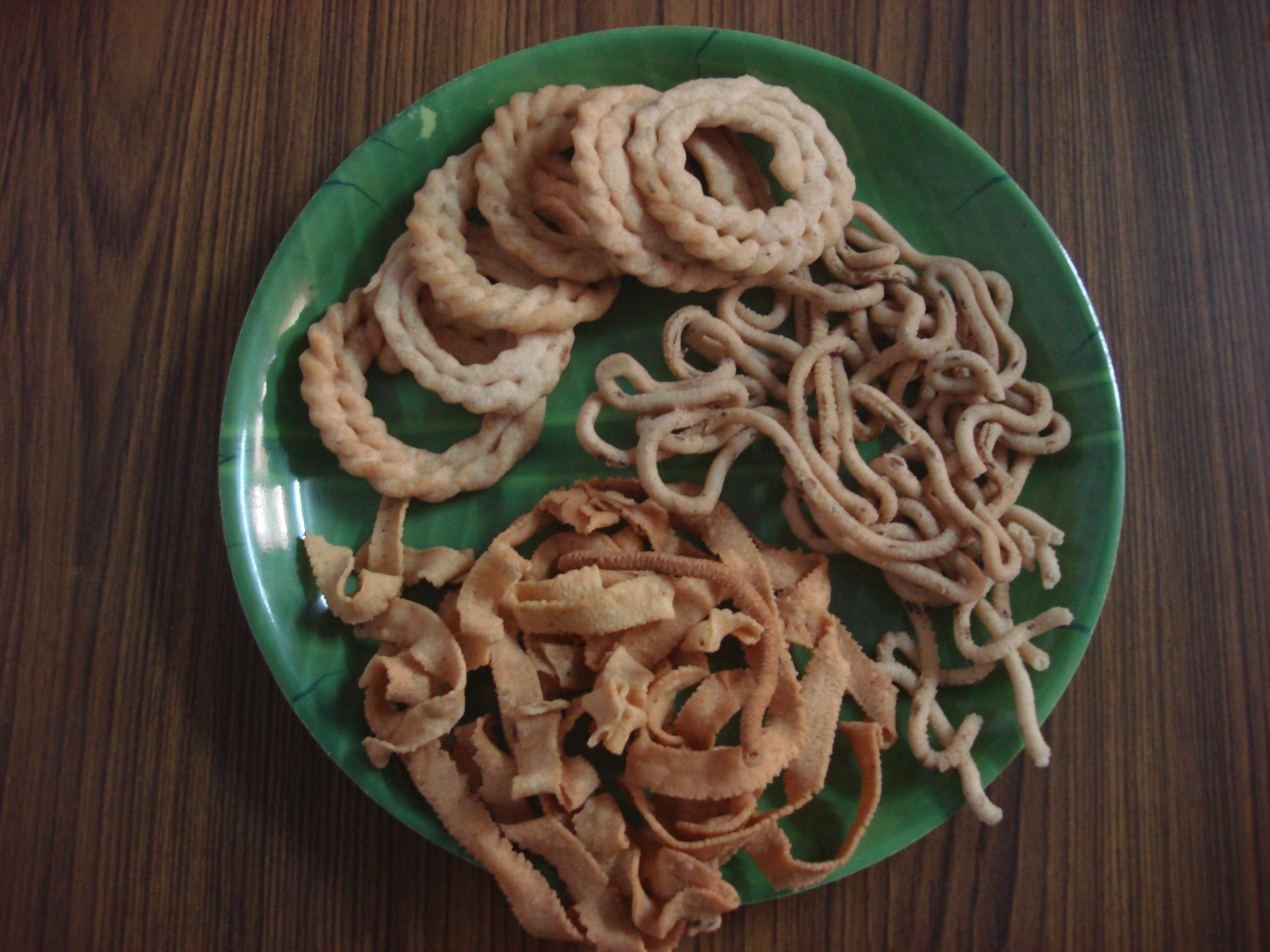
Murrukku and similar snacks

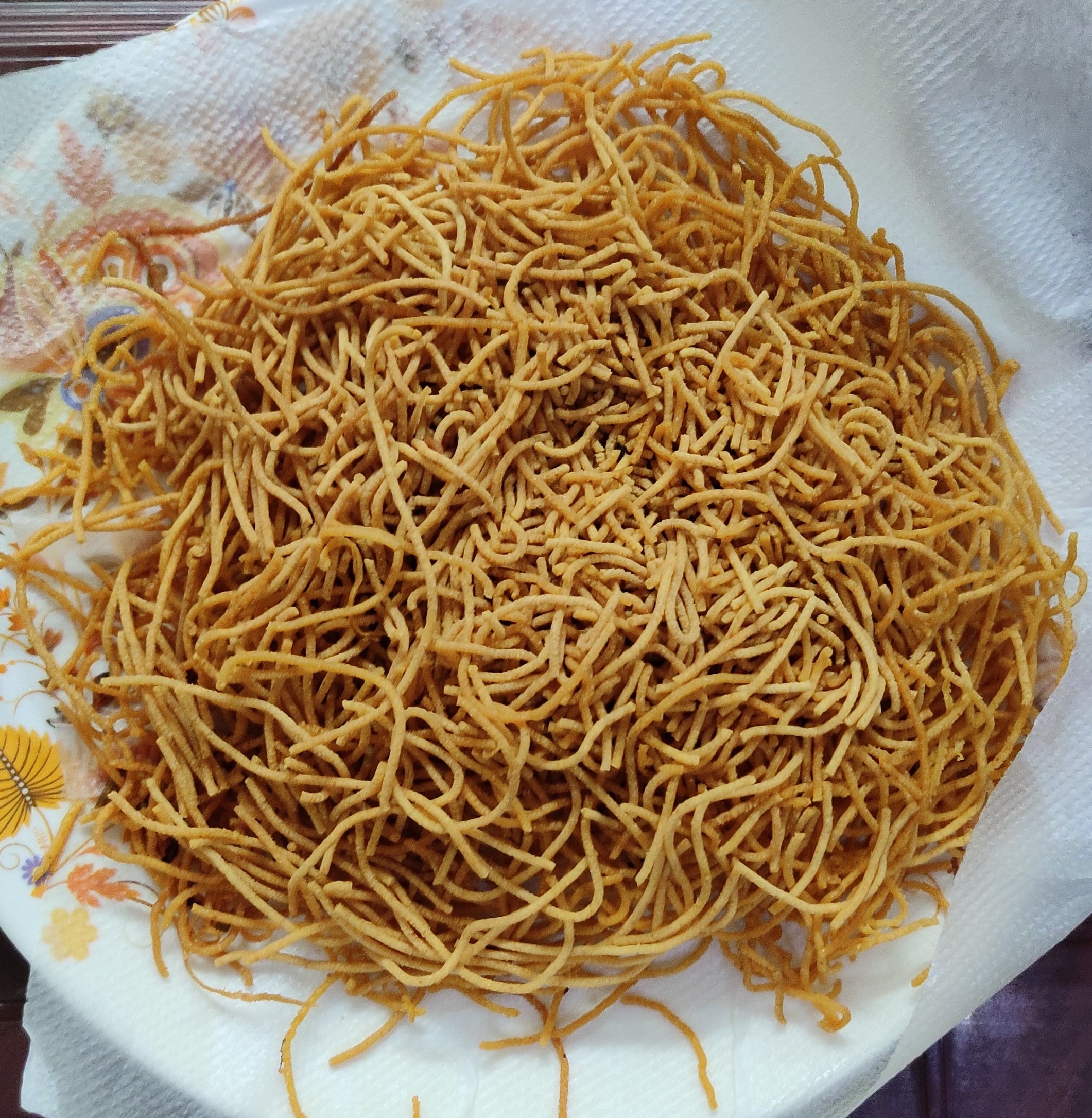
Sev Muruku

== See also ==
- Jhilinga, a similar Nepalese dish made from rice flour
- Manapparai Murukku
- Chakli
- Zalabiyeh
