= Kadboli =

Indian snack

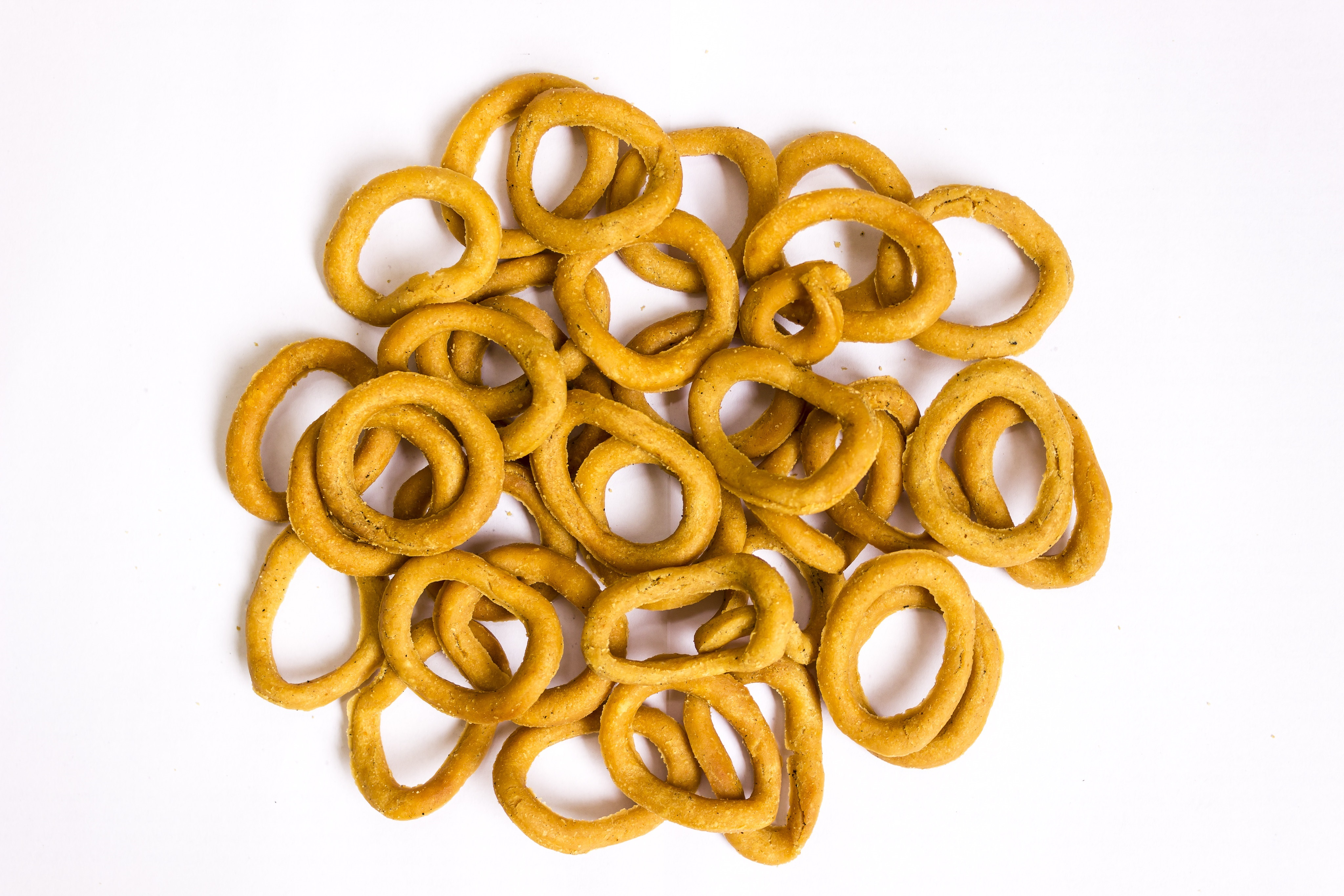
- Kadboli
- Type: Snack
- Place of origin: West India
- Region or state: Maharashtra, Karnataka
- Main ingredients: Flour mixture of chickpea, urid, rice, Moong and cumin seeds

Kadboli or kadaboli (Konkani and Marathi: कडबोळी), is a traditional savoury snack prepared in Konkan, India. Kadboli is typically made from a mixture of chickpea, urad, moong and rice flour, salt, and flavourings such as chili, ajwain, or cumin.

The same dish is known as kodubale in Karnataka, the only difference being that only rice and split roasted chickpea (dalia) flour are used.

== Other details ==
Kadboli lasts for a few weeks if stored properly in an airtight container. As a result, this is a great anytime snack. Kadboli is mainly prepared in the states of Maharashtra, Andhra Pradesh and Karnataka.
