= Chakli =

Savoury Indian snack

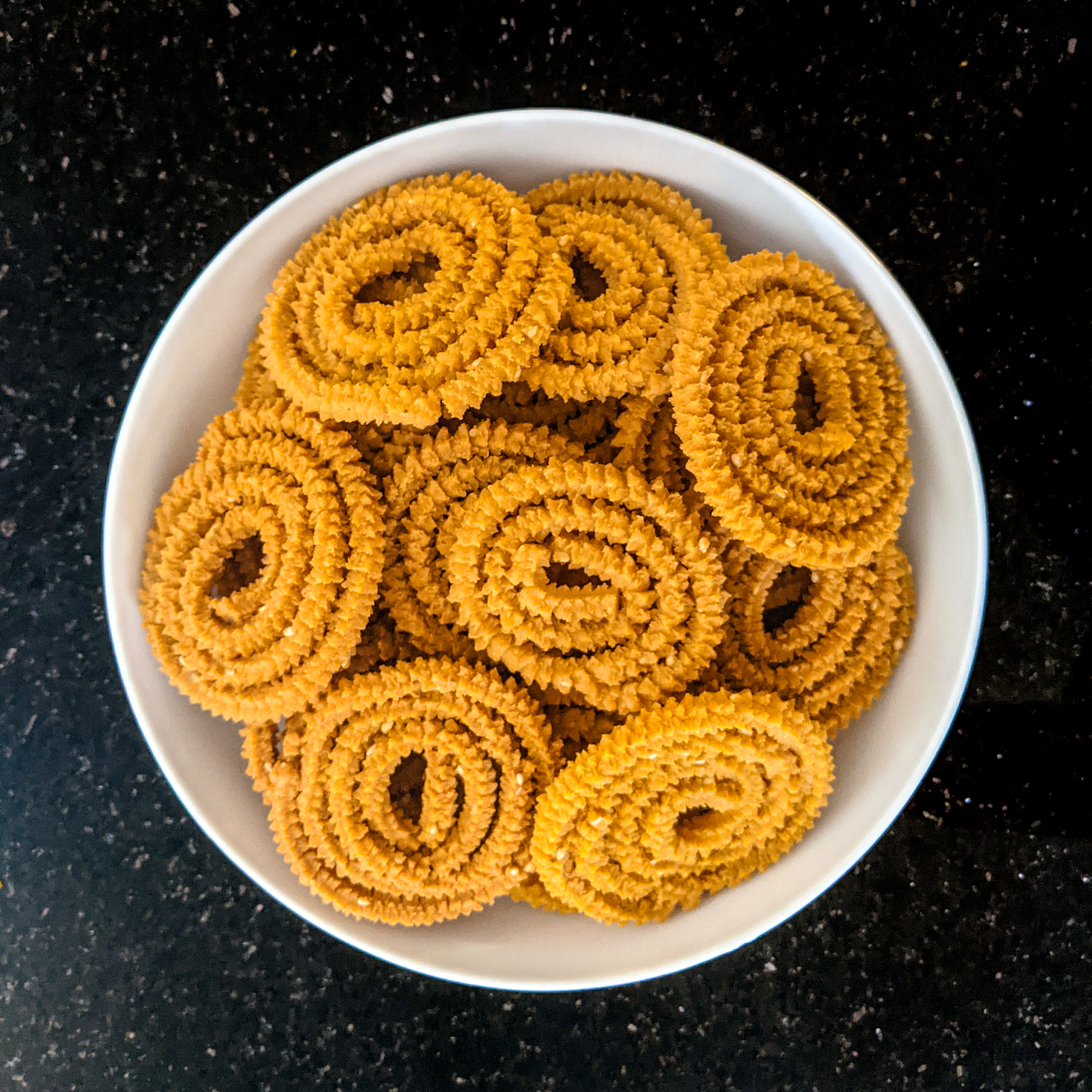
- Chakli
- Alternative names: Chakali, chakli, chakkuli, chakri
- Type: Fried dough
- Course: Snack
- Place of origin: India
- Region or state: Karnataka, Maharashtra
- Associated cuisine: Indian
- Main ingredients: Rice flour, Bengal gram flour, black gram flour, water, salt
- Variations: Murukku means twisted in Tamil. Chakli means chakli piece

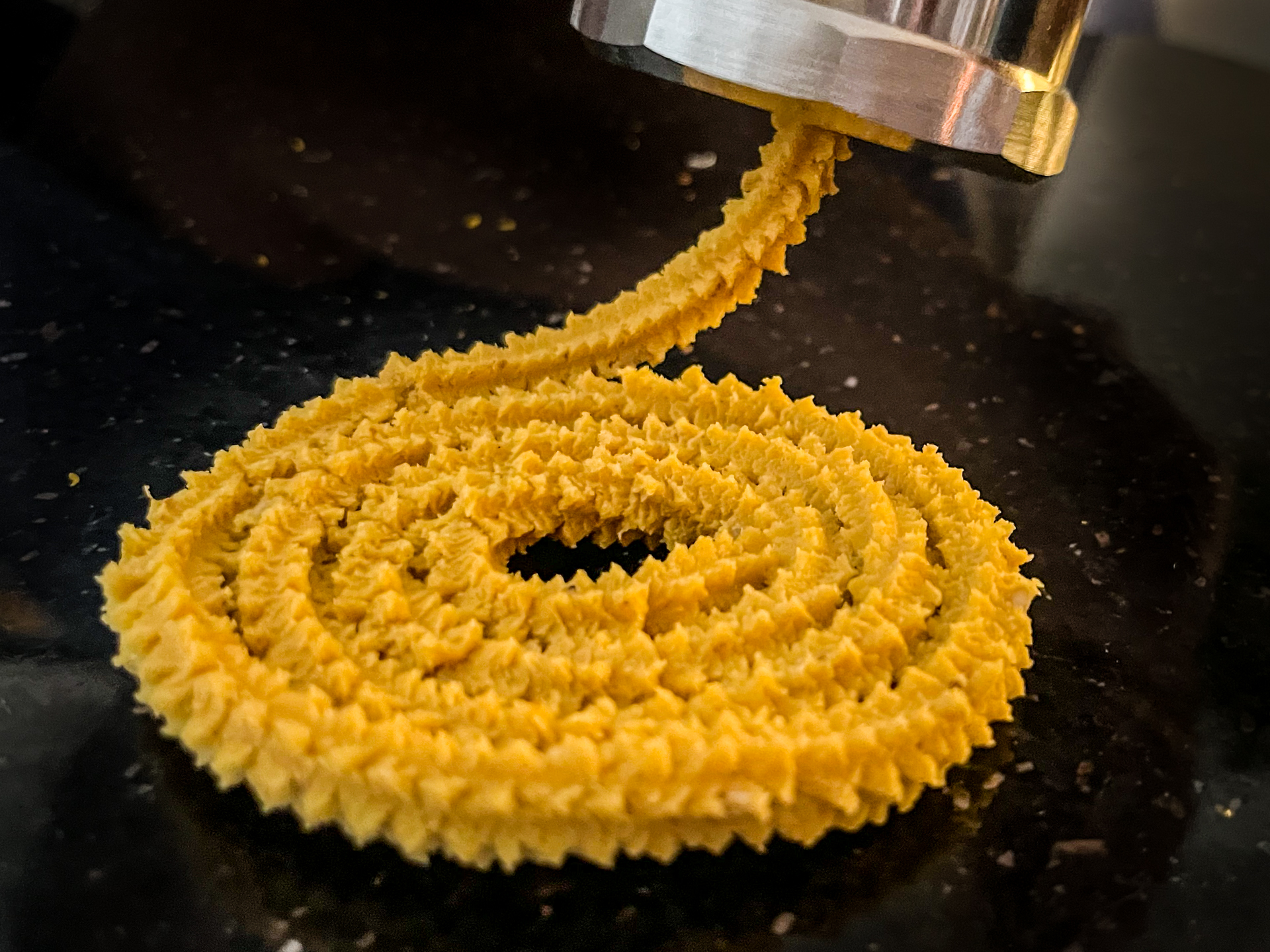
Extruding a chakli

Chakli is a savoury Indian snack with a spiral shape and spiked surface. It is also known as chakali, chakri or chakkuli.

Chakli is typically made from flours of rice, Bengal gram (brown chickpea) and black gram (urad daal). It has several variations, depending on the types and proportions of flours used. It is also very popular in South Africa, introduced by the Indian diaspora. Maize flour is used instead of rice flour with the addition of salt and cumin as the basic dry ingredients. It is sold by street vendors and at neighborhood shops.

Kadboli is a similar dish, which is shaped by hand instead of with an extruder. Murukku is a South Indian snack typically made with rice and black gram flour during Diwali. In Indonesia, murukku and chakli variations are known as akar kelapa and are particularly popular among Betawi.

== Etymology ==
Chakli is known by various names across India. The names of the dish include Kannada: ಚಕ್ಕುಲಿ chakkuli, Marathi: चकली chakali, Odia: ଦାନ୍ତକଲି dantkali, Gujarati: ચકરી chakri, Telugu: చక్రాలు chakralu or jantikalu and Konkani: chakri or chakkuli.

== History ==
The earliest mention of a dish similar to chakli comes from ancient Ayurvedic texts where it is known as saskuli; it was made from spiced rice flour dough with sesame seeds and then placed in a presser to form a long thread-like design and fried in ghee or oil. The word saskuli literally translates to "ear-shaped" design. This early variation of rice flour-based chakli may have more closely resembled rice-murukku than the chakli known today. The recipe that closely resembles modern Chakli finds mention in the medieval period cookbook Soopa Shastra dated to 1509 AD. This recipe was made from a blend of rice flour, Bengal gram flour and urad dal flour.

== Ingredients and preparation ==
Chakli is made from the flours of rice, Bengal gram (chickpea) and black gram (urad dal). Other ingredients include coriander seed powder, cumin seed (jeera) powder, sesame seeds, red pepper powder, turmeric powder, salt, asafoetida powder and oil. Some variations also include green gram (moong) and pigeon pea (tuar/arhar) instead of black gram.

The flours and seed powders are mixed, and boiling water is added to make a dough. The dough is kneaded and shaped into circular forms, using a mould. In commercial food processing units, usually a chakli extruder is used for shaping the dough. The shaped dough is fried in hot oil until it becomes brown in colour. It is then removed from the oil, drained and cooled.

== Gallery ==
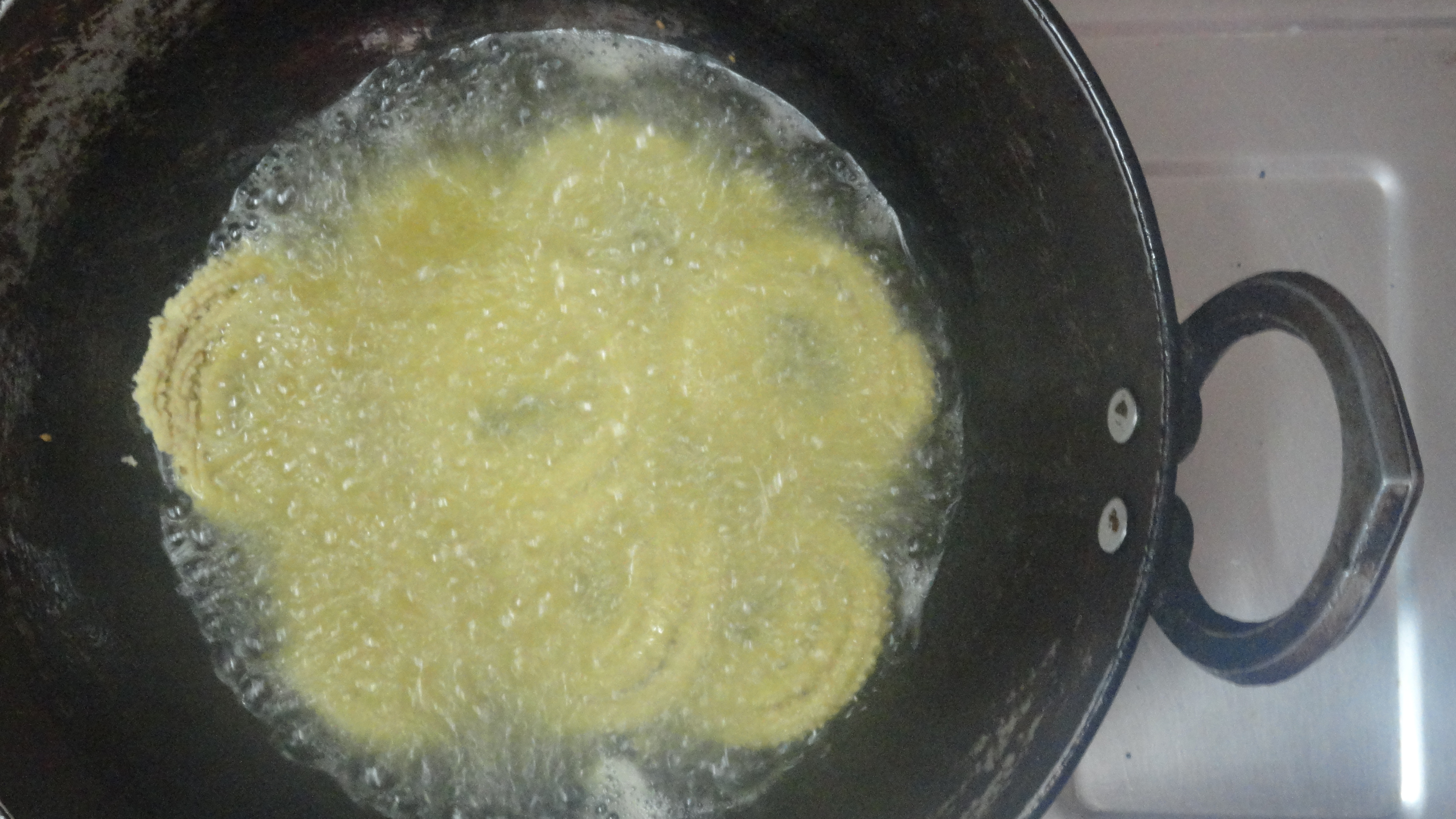
Preparation of chakri in hot oil

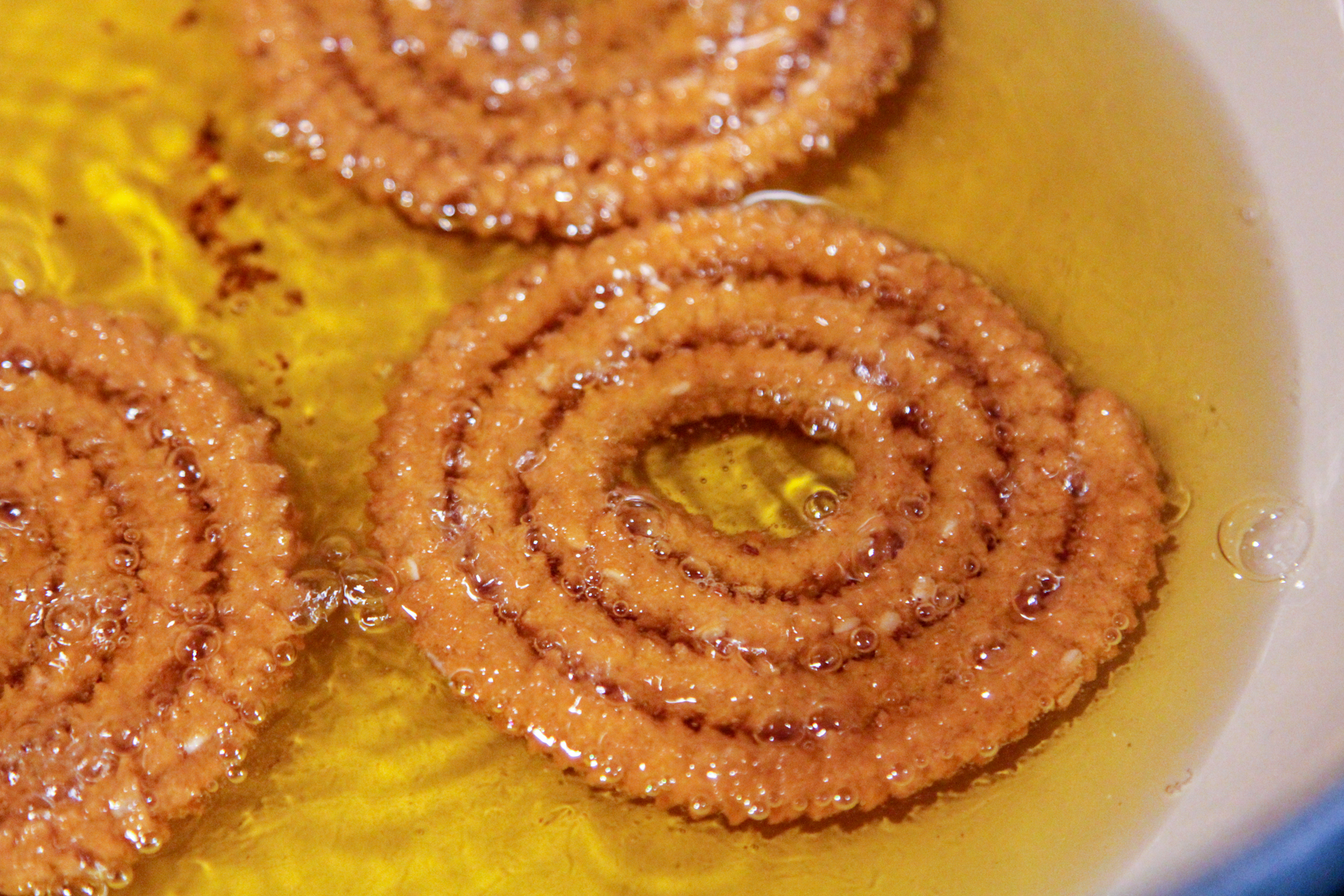
Frying chakli

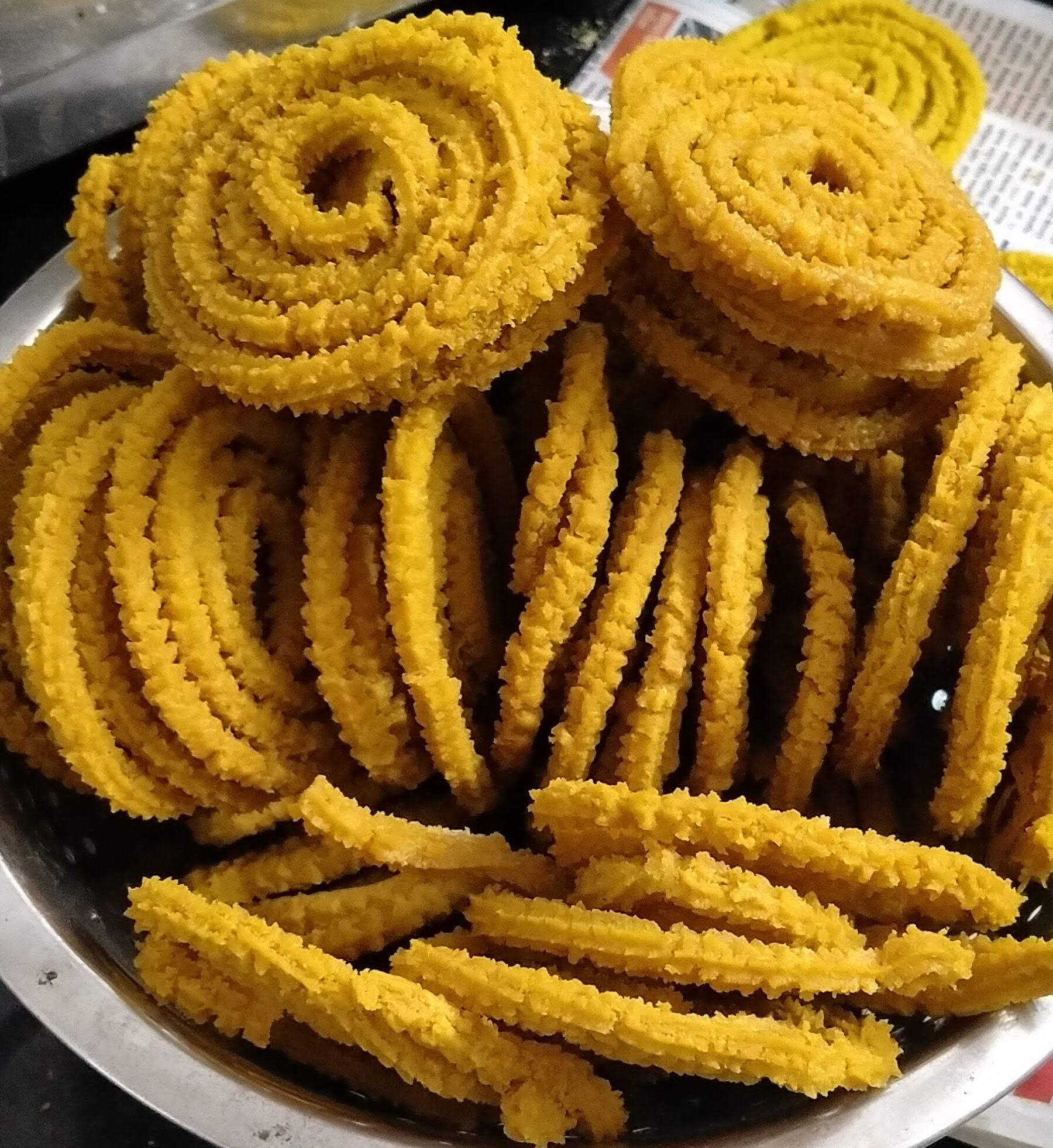
Chaklis

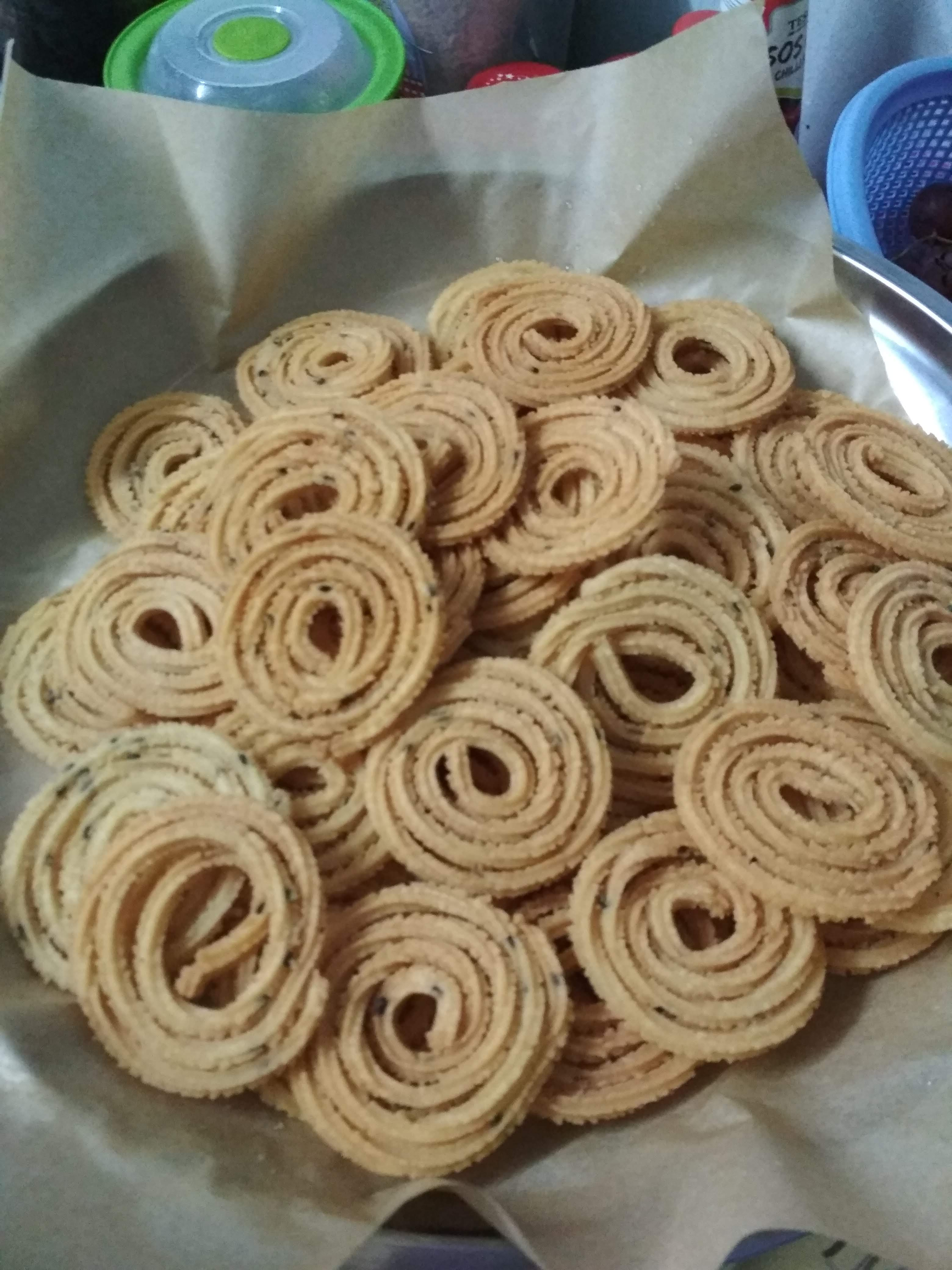
Muruku chaklis

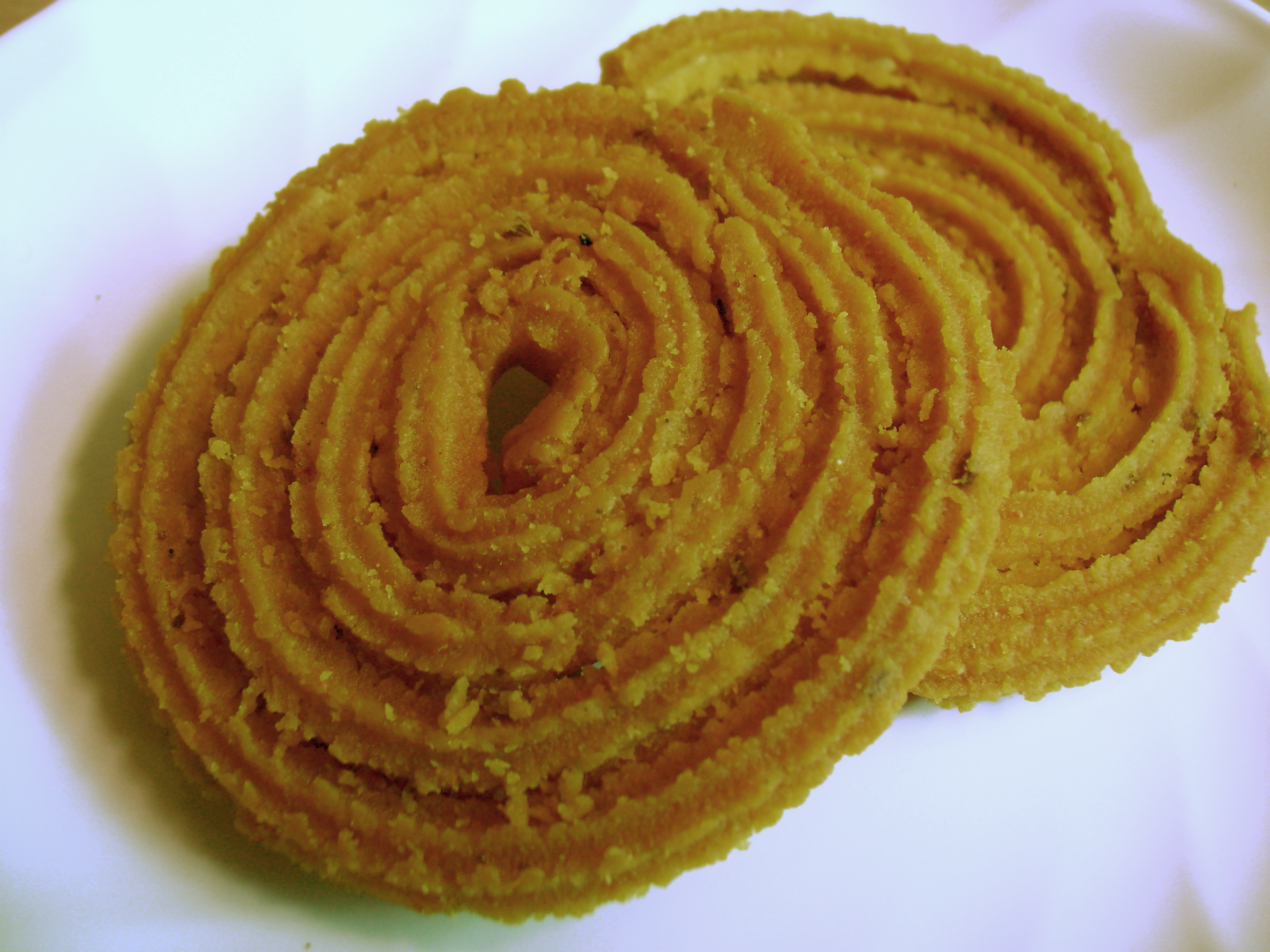
Fully cooked chakli

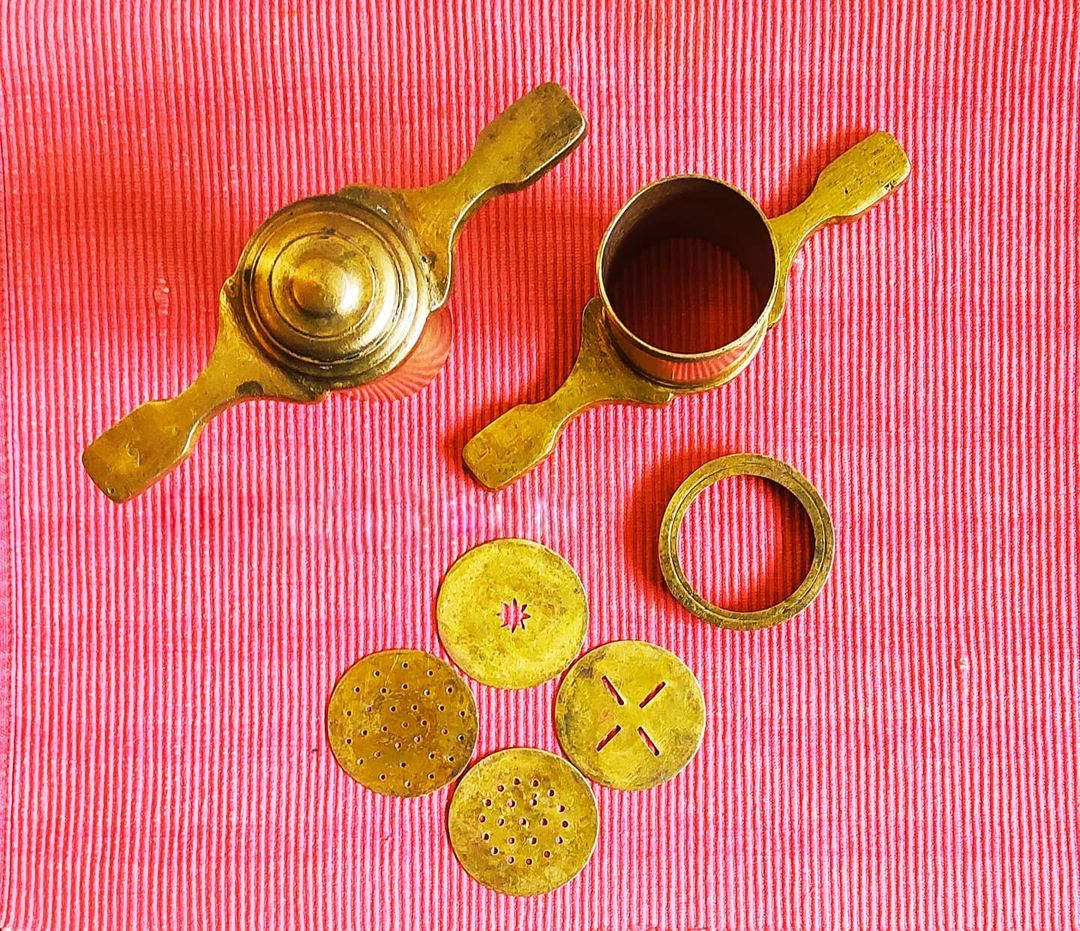
Traditional brass presser used for chaklis and various other snacks

== See also ==
- List of snack foods from the Indian subcontinent
- Murukku
