= Jhilinga =

Nepali festive food

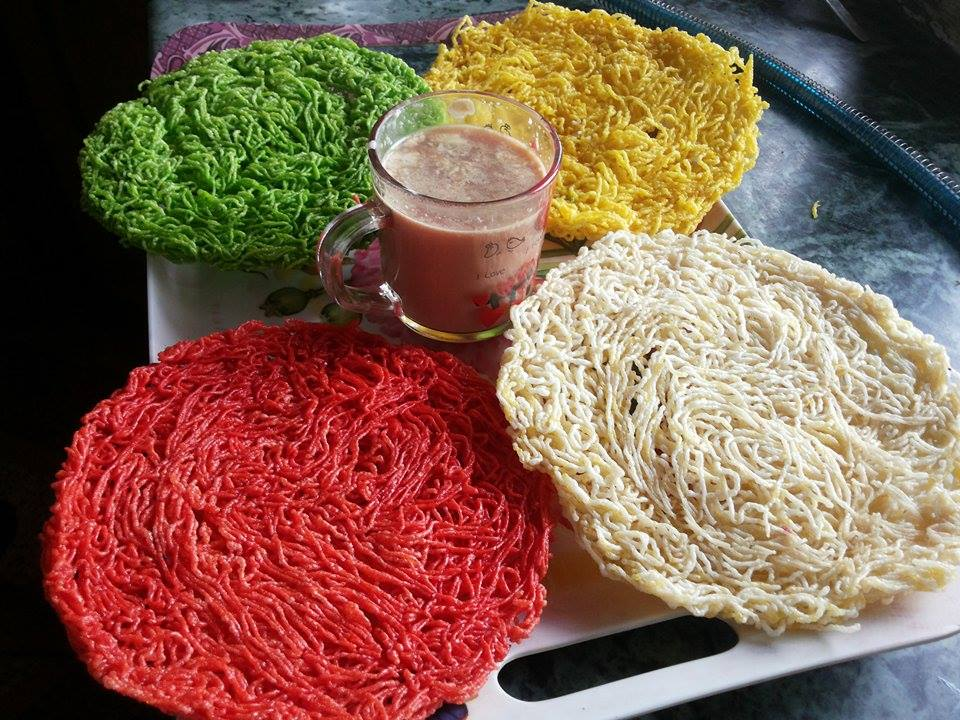
Jhilinga with tea, popular in festive season as snacks.

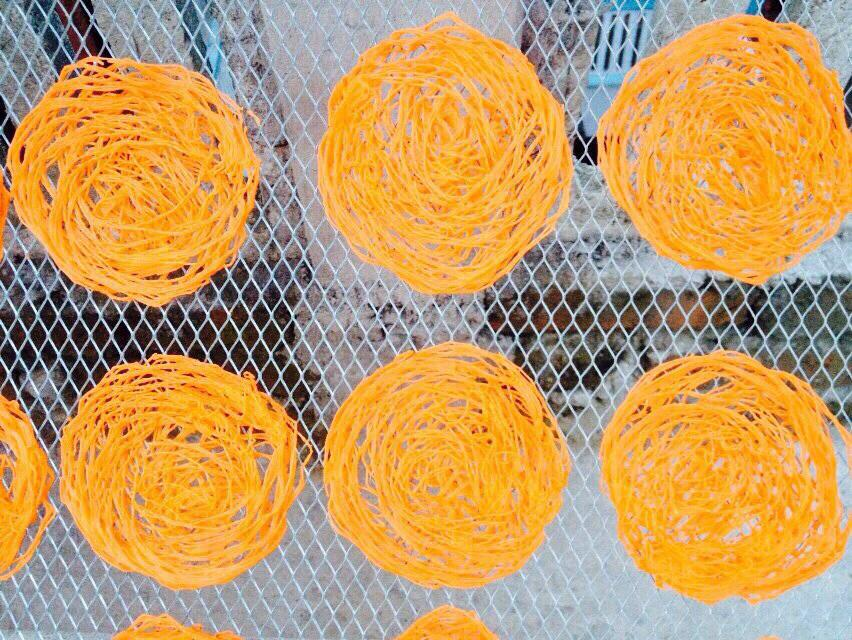
Jhilinga

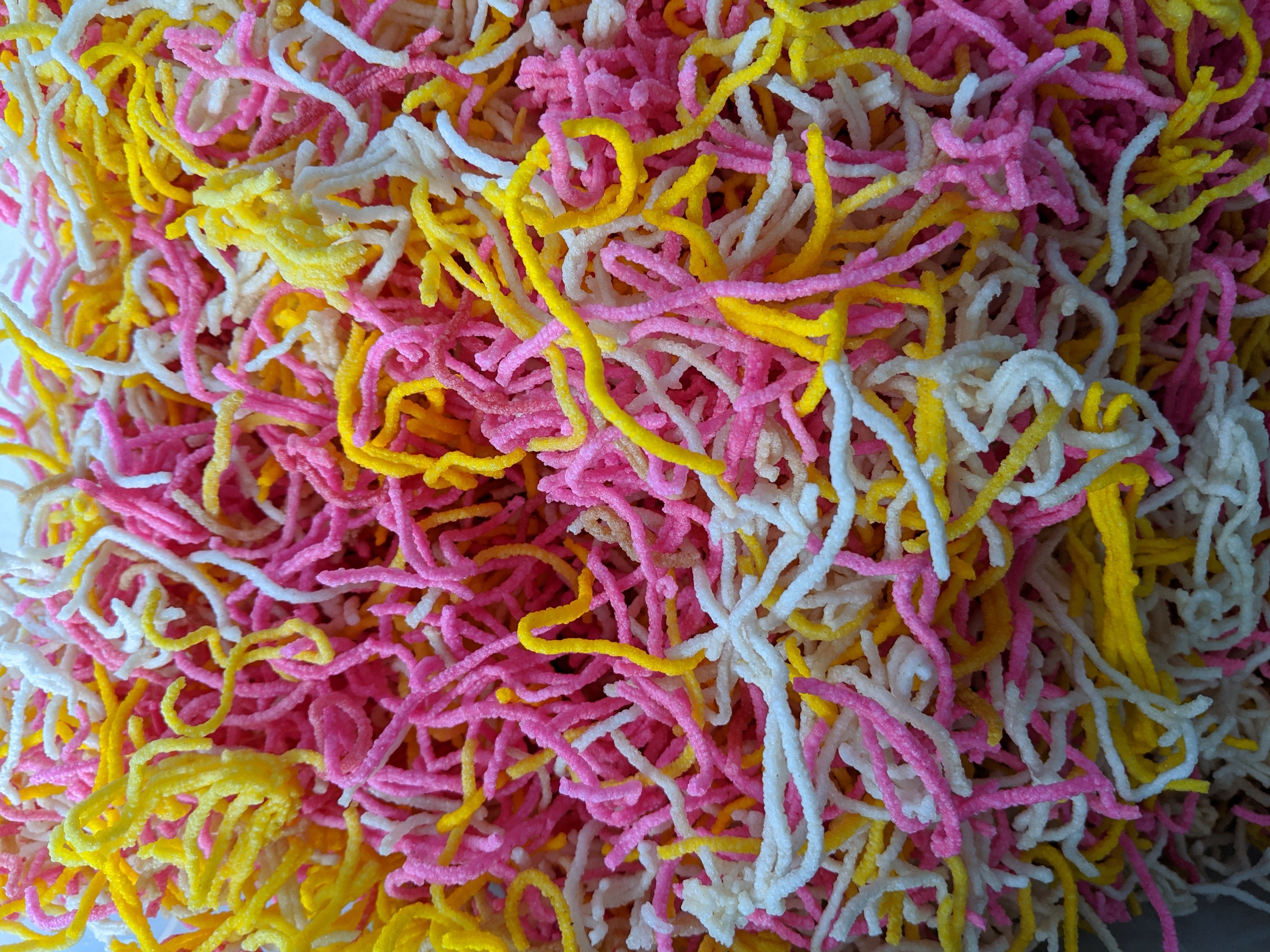
Fried Jhilinga pieces

Jhilinga is a traditional Nepalese food specially popular during festivals. Jhilinga is super crunchy, and is favored by people of all age groups. It is closely associated with people of different ethnicity like the Newars, Gurungs, Magars, Brahmins. Popularity of Jhilinga still largely exists in villages and towns of Nepal. The process of making Jhilinga is really simple requiring minimal ingredients. However, a good set of skilled hands is required to craft the pieces into proper circles.

The history of Jhilinga is disputed. The dish is characterized by its frugality, reflecting agricultural hardship during ancient times. So it certainly was invented a long probably in villages across Nepal. Jhilinga is consumed largely during festivals, weddings and a variety of ceremonies. It is also associated with rituals and therefor has a significant cultural significance. From ancient times to even today, Jhilinga is used as Shagun (present) i.e. an offering taken with you when you visit guests or relatives.

== Preparation methods ==
=== Ingredients ===
- Rice flour
- Water
- Food color of your choice

==== Method ====
Boil water in a deep casserole. Slowly add rice flour and food color into the boiling water while stirring constantly with a wooden spoon. This process is similar to making dhindo albeit without the ghee. The mixture should have a good balance and consistency of flour and water. Once the mixture is properly cooked, process through noodle machine so thin and round strips of the mixture is produced. While the strips are coming out, hold the plate in such a way that the strips make concentric circles outwards. This requires skill and practice. Let the wet Jhilinga dray out in the sun. When dried, Jhilinga should be stored in dry airy place until ready to be fried.

Jhilinga can be deep fried to consume. Mustard oil or vegetable oil or a mix of oil and clarified butter (ghee) can be used to fry it.

== See also ==
- Murukku
