= Indian regional cuisines =

Culinary traditions of regions of India

Cuisine differs widely across India's diverse regions as a result of variation in local culture, geographical location (proximity to sea, desert, or mountains), and economics.

== Andaman and Nicobar Islands ==
Seafood plays a major role in the cuisine of the Andaman and Nicobar Islands. Staples of the diet of the Indigenous Andamanese traditionally include roots, honey, fruits, meat, and fish, obtained by hunting and gathering. Some insects were also eaten as delicacies. Immigration from mainland of India, however, has resulted in variations in the cuisine.

== Andhra Pradesh ==
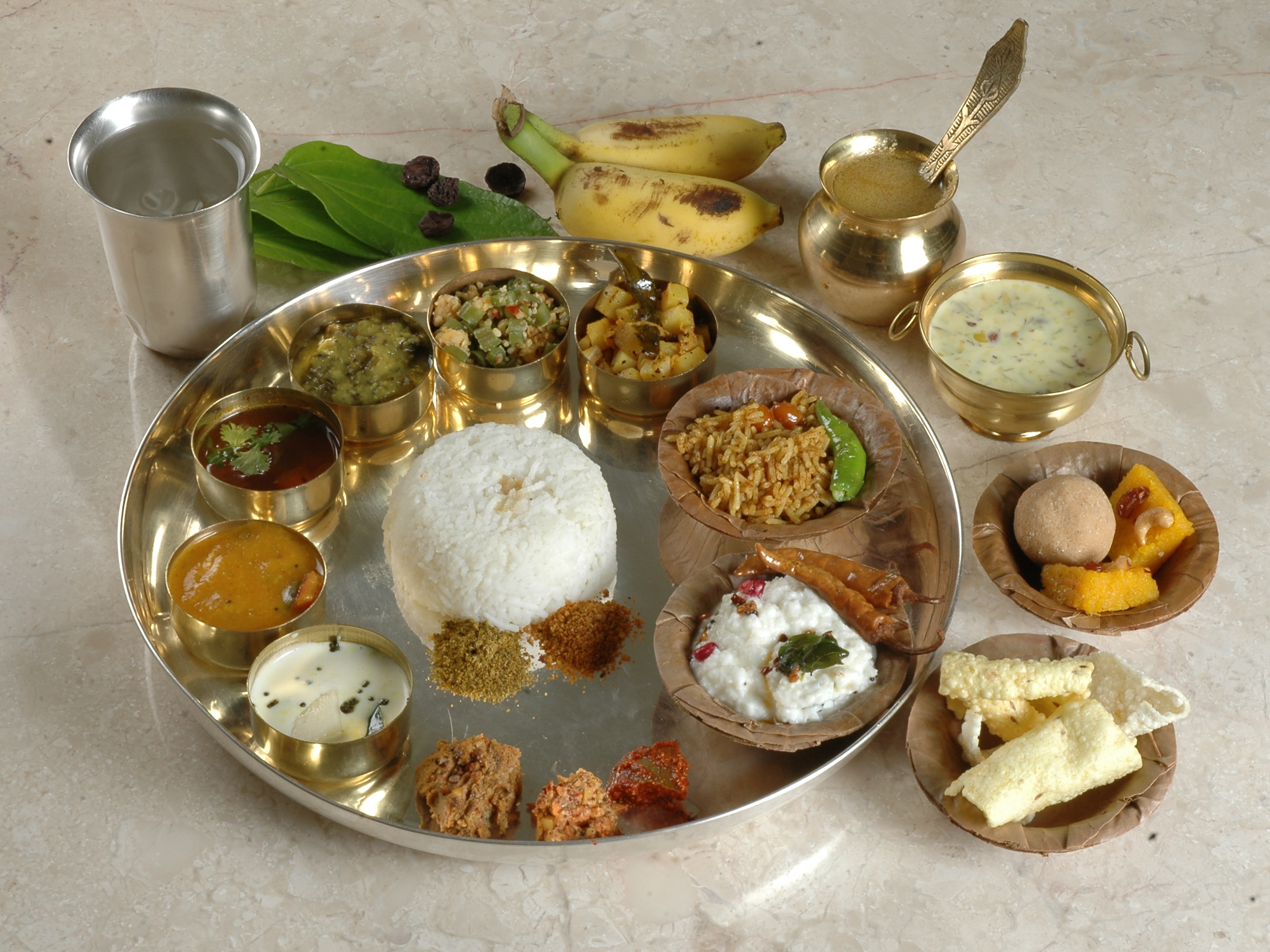
A vegetarian Andhra meal served on important occasions

The cuisine of Andhra Pradesh belongs to the two Telugu-speaking regions of Rayalaseema and Coastal Andhra and is part of Telugu cuisine. The food of Andhra Pradesh is known for its heavy use of spices, and the use of tamarind.

Seafood is common in the coastal region of the state. Rice is the staple food (as is with all South Indian states) eaten with lentil preparations such as pappu (lentils) and pulusu (stew) and spicy vegetables or curries.

In Andhra, leafy greens or vegetables such as bottle-gourd and eggplant are usually added to dal. Pickles are an essential part of the local cuisine; popular among those are mango-based pickles such as avakaya and maagaya, gongura (a pickle made from sorrel leaves), usirikaya (gooseberry or amla), nimmakaya (lime), and tomato pickle.

Perugu (yogurt) is a common addition to meals, as a way of tempering spiciness. Breakfast items include dosa, pesarattu (mung bean dosa), vada, and idli.

== Arunachal Pradesh ==
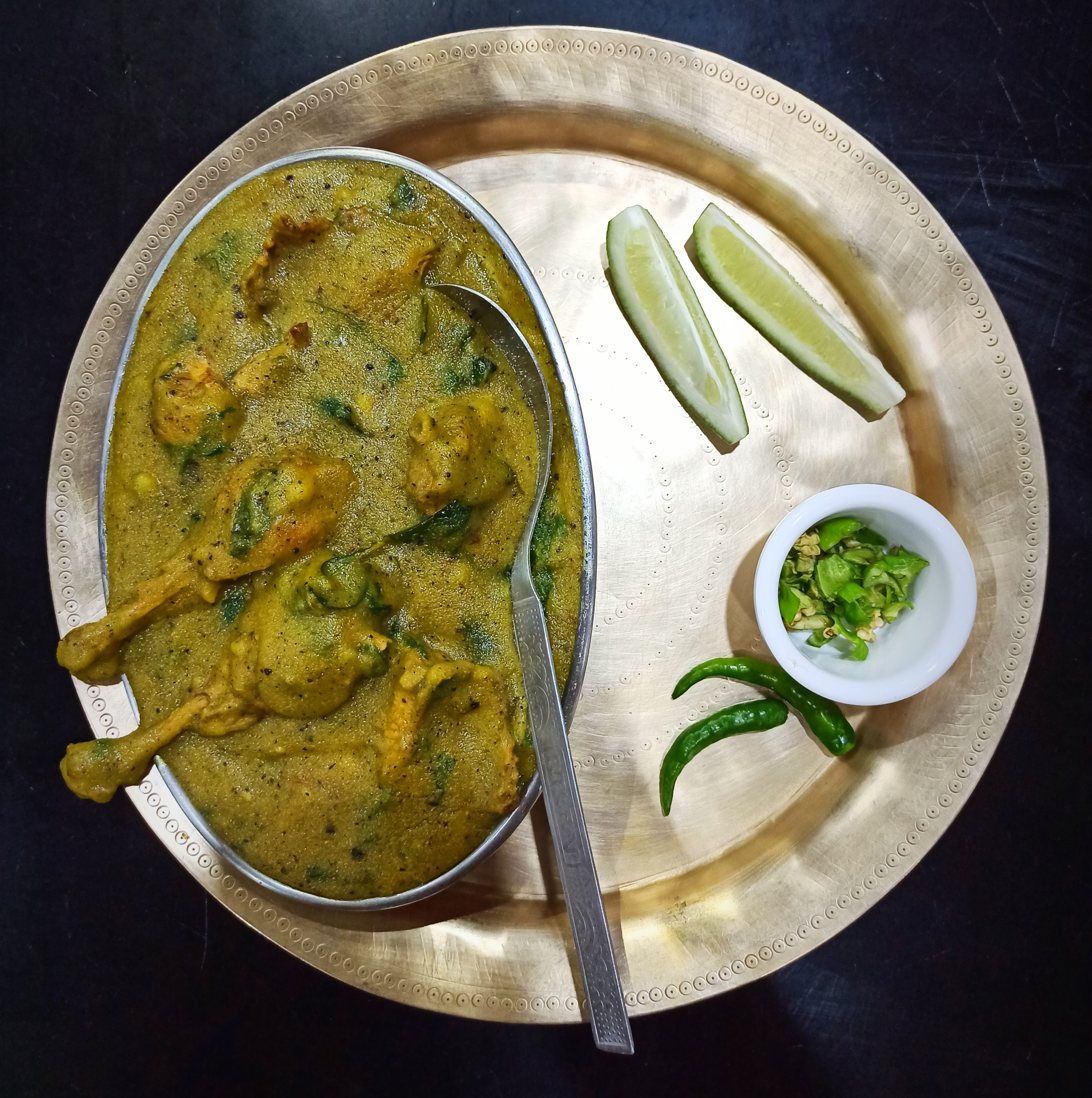
Pitang Oying

Arunachal Pradesh is located in the northeast of India, bordered by Bhutan, Myanmar, and a disputed border with Tibet.

The staple food is rice, along with fish, meat, and leaf vegetables. Native tribes of Arunachal are meat eaters and use fish, eggs, beef, chicken, pork, and mutton to make their dishes.

Many varieties of rice are used. Boiled rice cakes wrapped in leaves are a popular snack. Thukpa is a kind of noodle soup common among the Monpa tribe of the region.

Lettuce is the most common vegetable, usually prepared by boiling with ginger, coriander, and green chillies.

Apong or rice beer made from fermented rice or millet is a popular beverage in Arunachal Pradesh and is consumed as a refreshing drink.

== Assam ==
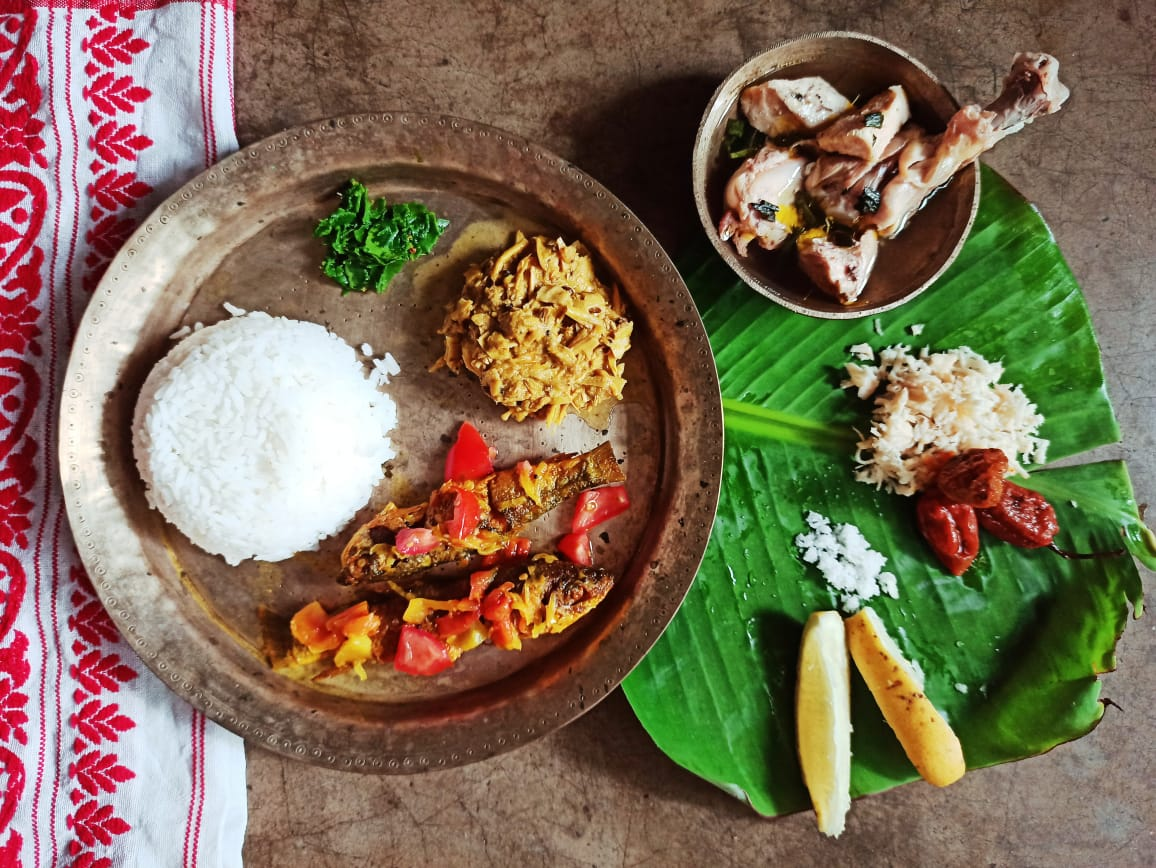
A lunch platter of Assamese cuisine

Assam is located in the northeast of India, bordered by Bhutan. Its cuisine is a mixture of different indigenous styles, with considerable regional variation and some external influences. Although it is known for its limited use of spices, Assamese cuisine has strong flavours from its use of endemic herbs, fruits, and vegetables served fresh, dried, or fermented.

Rice is the staple food item and a huge variety of endemic rice varieties, including several varieties of sticky rice are a part of the cuisine in Assam. Fish, generally freshwater varieties, are widely eaten. Other non-vegetarian items include chicken, duck, squab, snails, silkworms, insects, goat, pork, venison, turtle, monitor lizard, etc.

The region's cuisine involves simple cooking processes, mostly barbecuing, steaming, or boiling. Spices are not fried before use in the cuisine of Assam.

A traditional meal in Assam begins with a khar, a class of dishes named after the main ingredient and ends with a tenga, a sour dish. Homebrewed rice beer or rice wine is served before a meal. The food is usually served in bell metal utensils. Paan, the practice of chewing betel nut, generally concludes a meal.

== West Bengal ==
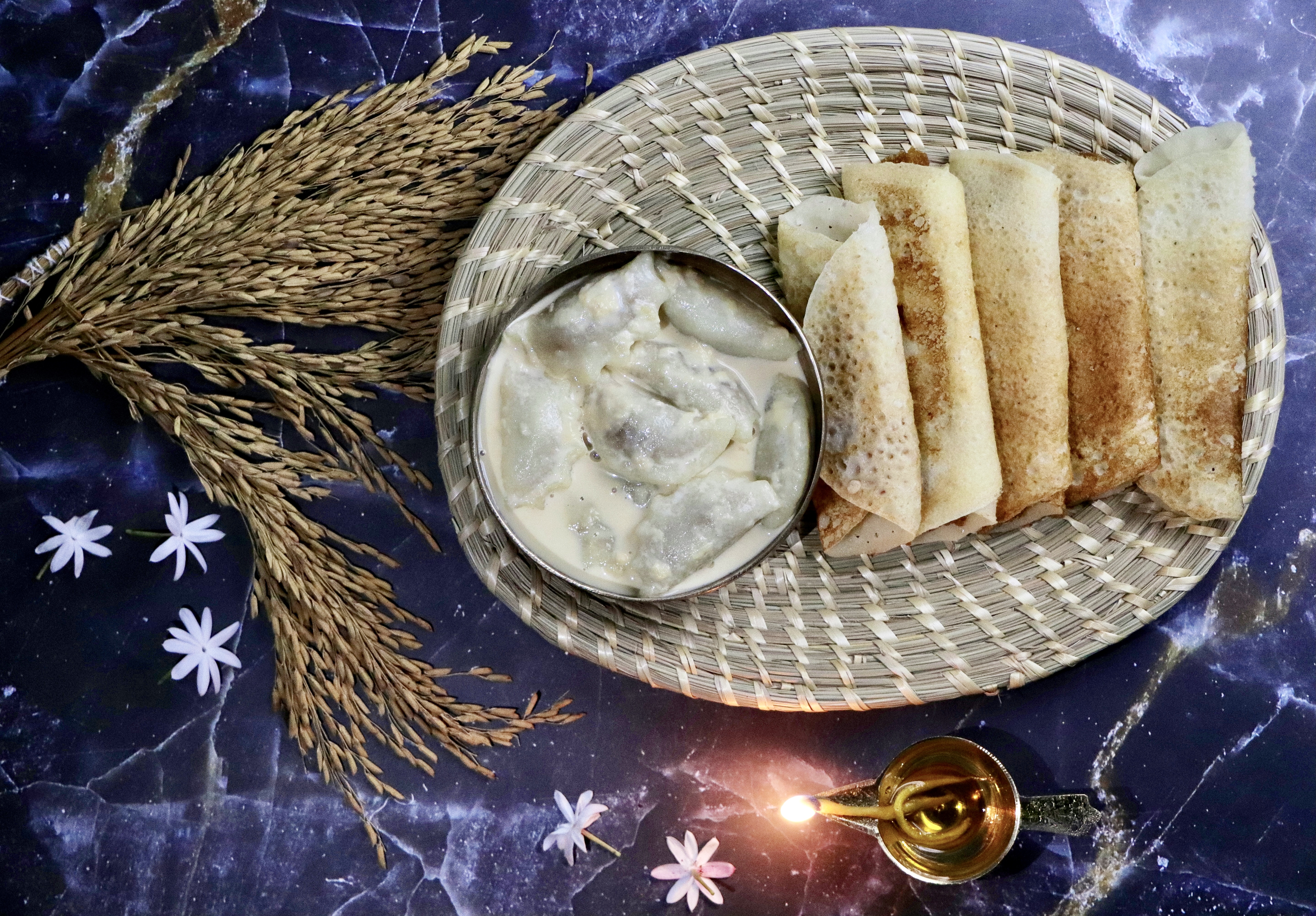
Pithe Puli

West Bengal is located in the eastern portion of India, along the Bay of Bengal.

Mughal cuisine is a universal influencer in the Bengali palate, and has introduced Persian and Islamic foods to the region, as well as a number of more elaborate methods of preparing food, like marination using ghee. Fish, meat (chicken, goat meat), egg, rice, milk, and sugar all play crucial parts in Bengali cuisine.

Bengali cuisine can be subdivided into four different types of dishes, charbya (চর্ব্য), or food that is chewed, such as rice or fish; choṣya (চোষ্য়), or food that is sucked, such as ambal and tak; lehya (লেহ্য), or foods that are meant to be licked, like chuttney; and peya (পেয়), which includes drinks, mainly milk.

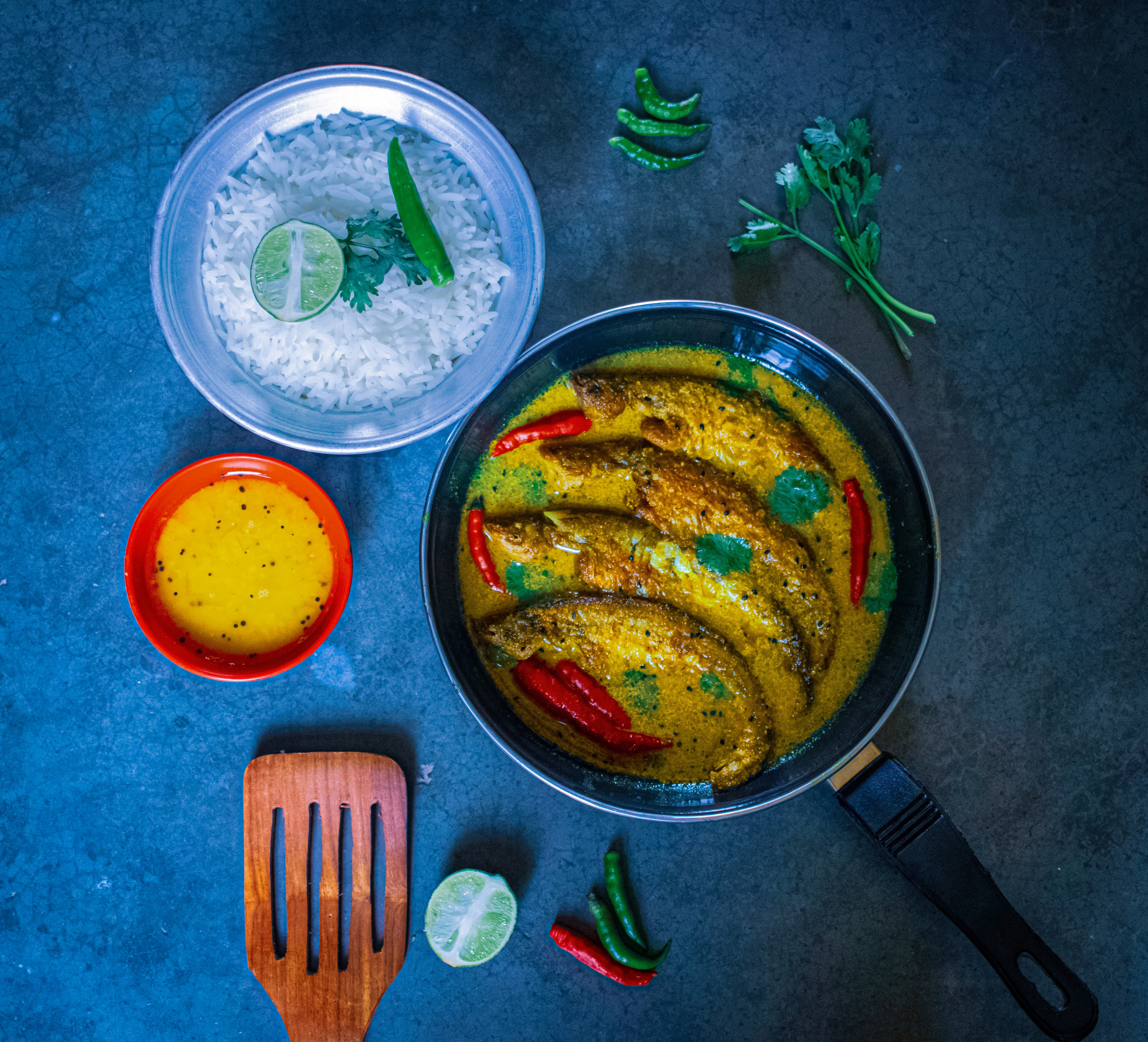
Shorshe Pabda (Pabo catfish in mustard paste)

During the 19th century, many Odia-speaking cooks were employed in Bengal, which led to the transfer of several food items between the two regions. Bengali cuisine is the only traditionally developed multi-course tradition from the Indian subcontinent that is analogous in structure to the modern service à la russe style of French cuisine, with food served course-wise rather than all at once.

Bengali cuisine differs according to regional tastes, such as the emphasis on the use of chilli pepper in the Chittagong district of Bangladesh However, across all its varieties, there is predominant use of mustard oil along with large amounts of spices.

The cuisine is known for subtle flavours with an emphasis on fish, meat, vegetables, lentils, and rice. Bread is also a common dish in Bengali cuisine, particularly a deep-fried version called luchi is popular. Fresh aquatic fish is one of its most distinctive features; Bengalis prepare fish in many ways, such as steaming, braising, or stewing in vegetables and sauces based on coconut milk or mustard.

East Bengali food, which has a high presence in West Bengal and Bangladesh, is much spicier than the West Bengali cuisine, and tends to use high amounts of chilli, and is one of the spiciest cuisines in India and the World.

Shondesh and Rashogolla are popular dishes made of sweetened, finely ground fresh cheese. For the latter, West Bengal and neighbouring Odisha both claim to be the origin of dessert. Each state also has a geographical indication for their regional variety of rasgulla.

The cuisine is also found in the state of Tripura and the Barak Valley of Assam.

== Bihar ==
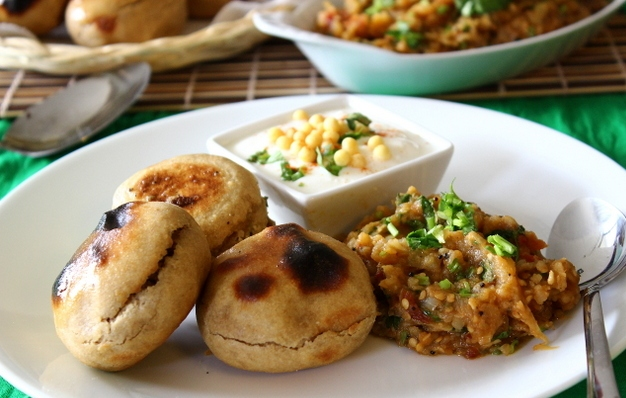
Litti Chokha

Bihari cuisine may include litti chokha, a baked salted wheat-flour cake filled with sattu (baked chickpea flour) and some special spices, which is served with baigan ke chokha, made of roasted eggplant (brinjal) and tomatoes.

Among meat dishes, meat saalan is a popular dish made of mutton or goat curry with cubed potatoes in garam masala.

Dalpuri is another popular dish in Bihar. It is salted wheat-flour bread, filled with boiled, crushed, and fried gram pulses.

Malpua is a popular sweet dish of Bihar, prepared by a mixture of maida, milk, bananas, cashew nuts, peanuts, raisins, sugar, water, and green cardamom. Another notable sweet dish of Bihar is balushahi, which is prepared by a specially treated combination of maida and sugar along with ghee, and the other worldwide famous sweet, khaja is made from flour, vegetable fat, and sugar, which is mainly used in weddings and other occasions. Silao near Nalanda is famous for its production.

During the festival of Chhath, thekua, a sweet dish made of ghee, jaggery, and whole-meal flour, flavoured with aniseed, is made.

Other food items that are quite prominent in Bihar are, Pittha, Aaloo Bhujiya, Reshmi Kebab, Palwal ki mithai, and Puri Sabzi.

== Chandigarh ==
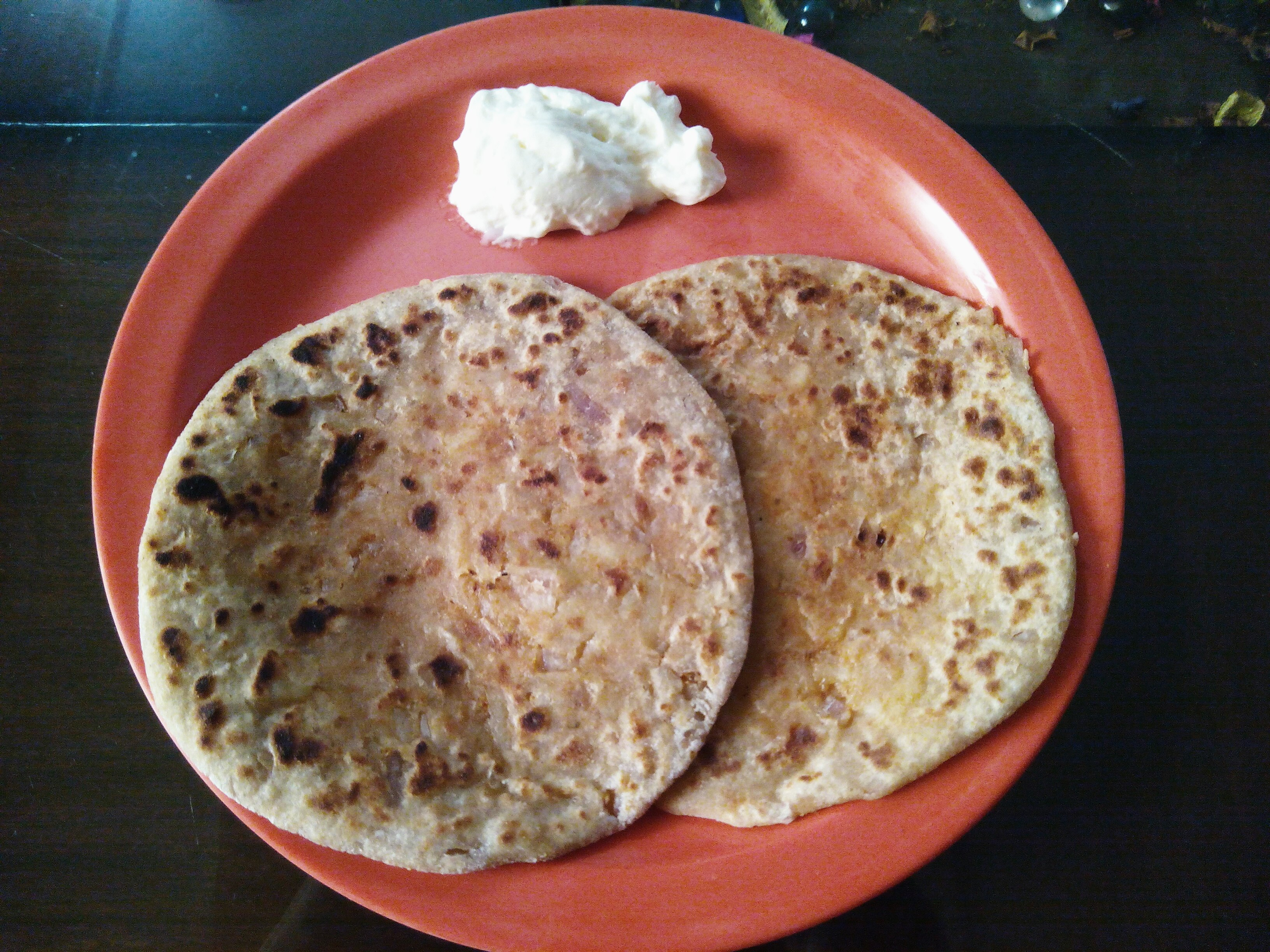
Punjabi aloo paratha served with butter

Chandigarh, the capital of Punjab and Haryana is a city of 20th-century origin with a cosmopolitan food culture mainly involving North Indian cuisine. People enjoy home-made recipes such as paratha, especially at breakfast, and other Punjabi foods like roti which is made from wheat, sweetcorn, or other glutenous flour with cooked vegetables or beans. Sarson da saag and dal makhani are well-known dishes among others. Popular snacks include gol gappa (known as panipuri in other places). It consists of a round, hollow puri, fried crisp and filled with a mixture of flavoured water, boiled and cubed potatoes, bengal gram beans, etc.

== Chhattisgarh ==
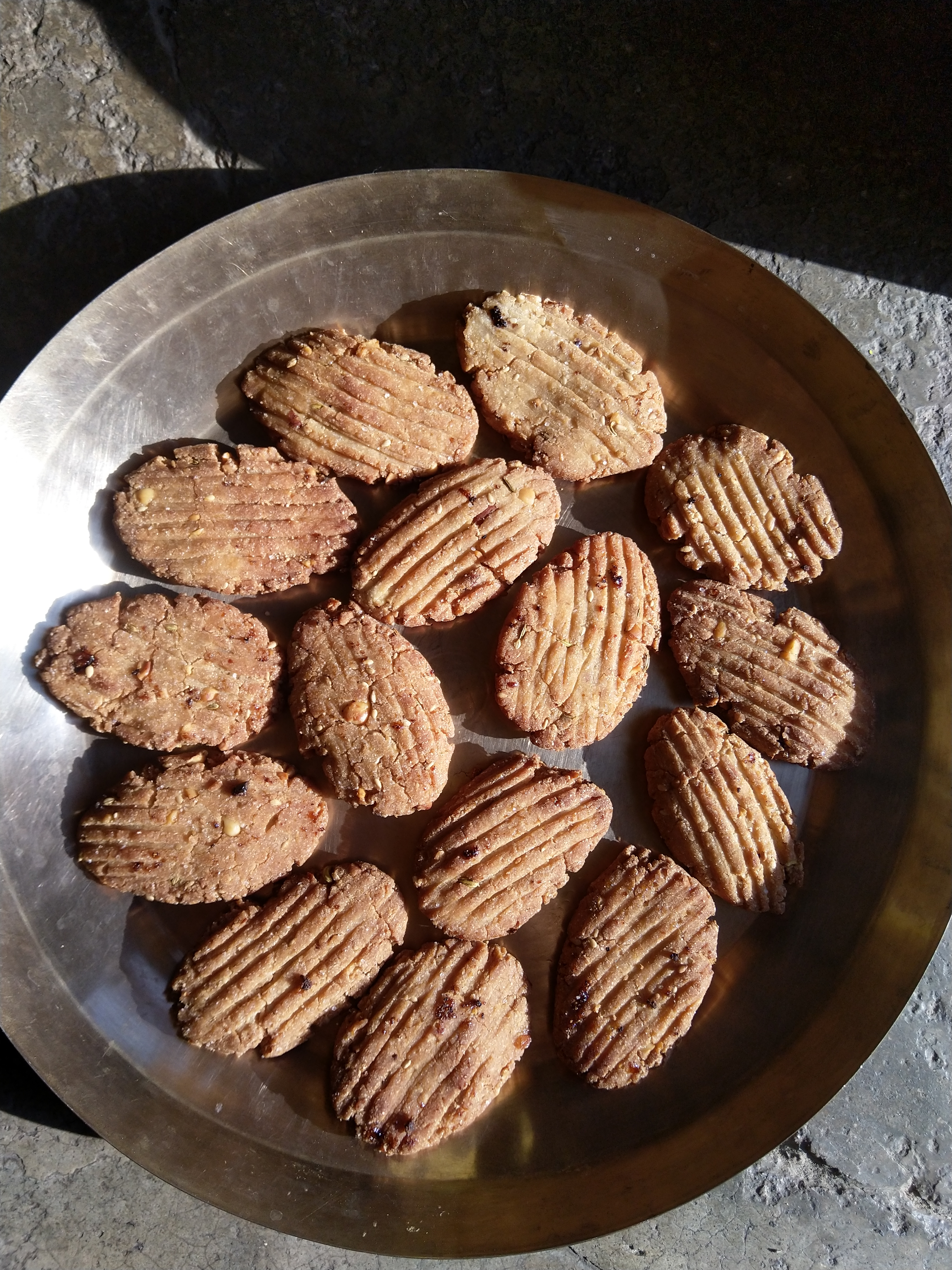
Chhattisgarhi Sweets Khurmi

Chhattisgarh cuisine is unique in nature and not found in the rest of India, although the staple food is rice, like in much of the country. Many Chhattisgarhi people drink liquor brewed from the mahuwa flower palm wine (tadi in rural areas). Chhattisgarhi cuisines varies as per special occasions and festivals like Thethari and Khurmi, fara, gulgule bhajiya, chausela, chila, aaersa are prepared in regional festivals. The tribal people of the Bastar region of Chhattisgarh eat ancestral dishes such as mushrooms, bamboo pickle, bamboo vegetables, etc.

== Dadra and Nagar Haveli ==
The local cuisine resembles the cuisine of Gujarat. Ubadiyu is a local delicacy made of vegetables and beans with herbs. The common foods include rice, roti, vegetables, river fish, and crab. People also enjoy buttermilk and chutney made of different fruits and herbs.

== Daman and Diu ==
Daman and Diu is a union territory of India which, like Goa, was a former colonial possession of Portugal. Consequently, both native Gujarati food and traditional Portuguese food are common. Being a coastal region, the communities are mainly dependent on seafood. Normally, rotli and tea are taken for breakfast, rotla and saak for lunch, and chokha along with saak and curry are taken for dinner. Some of the dishes prepared on festive occasions include puri, lapsee, potaya, dudh-plag, and dhakanu. While alcohol is prohibited in the neighbouring state of Gujarat, drinking is common in Daman and Diu. Better known as the "pub" of Gujarat. All popular brands of alcohol are readily available.

== Delhi ==
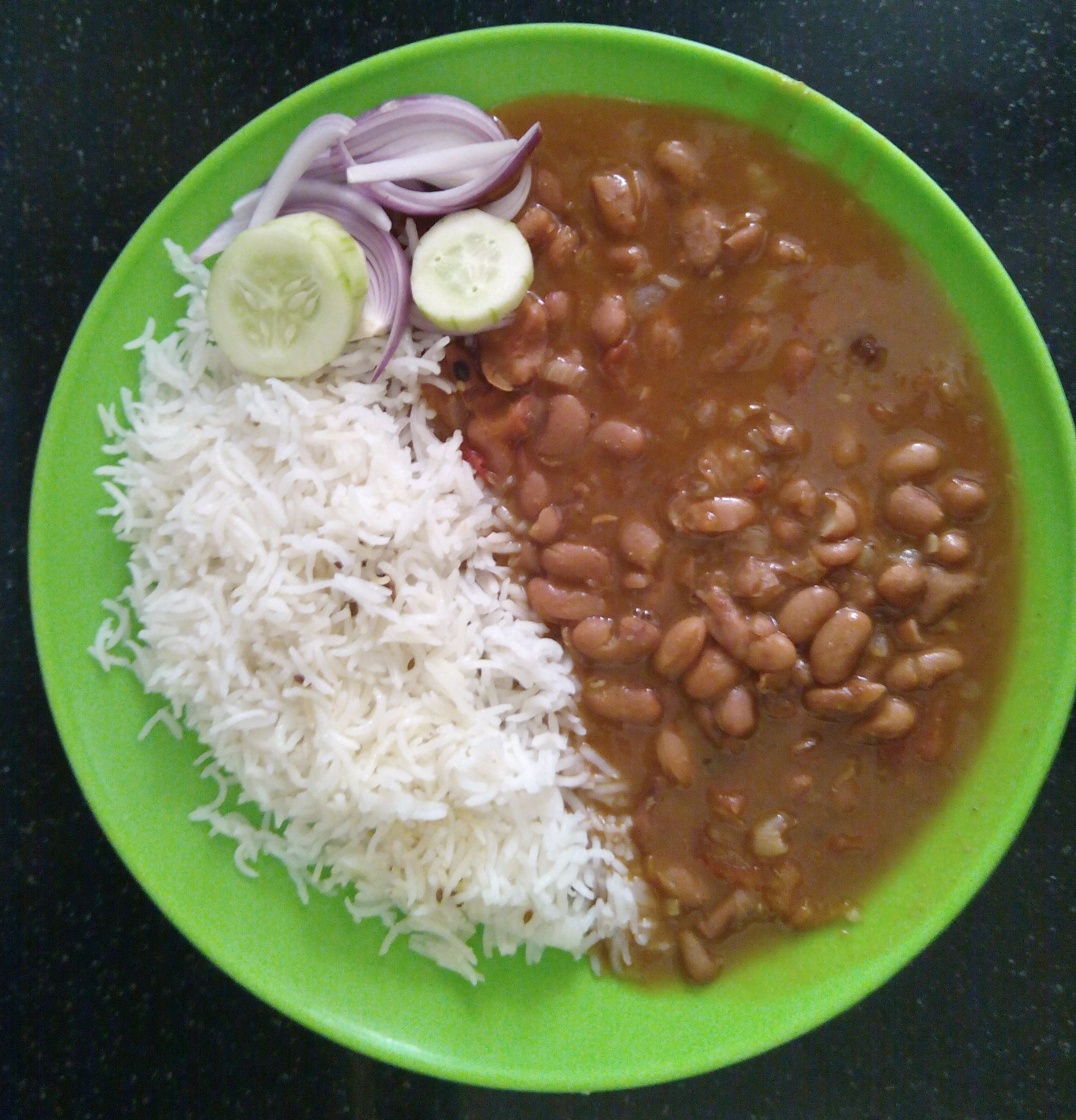
Rajma-chawal, curried red kidney beans with steamed rice

Delhi was once the capital of the Mughal empire, and it became the birthplace of Mughlai cuisine. Delhi is noted for its street food. The Paranthewali Gali in Chandani Chowk is just one of the culinary landmarks for stuffed flatbread (parathas).

Delhi has people from different parts of India, thus the city has different types of food traditions; its cuisine is influenced by the various cultures. Punjabi cuisine is common, due to the dominance of Punjabi communities.

Delhi cuisine is actually an amalgam of different Indian cuisines modified in unique ways. This is apparent in the different types of street food available. Kababs, kachauri, chaat, Indian sweets, Indian ice cream (commonly called kulfi), and even Western food items like sandwiches and patties, are prepared in a style unique to Delhi and are quite popular.

== Goa ==
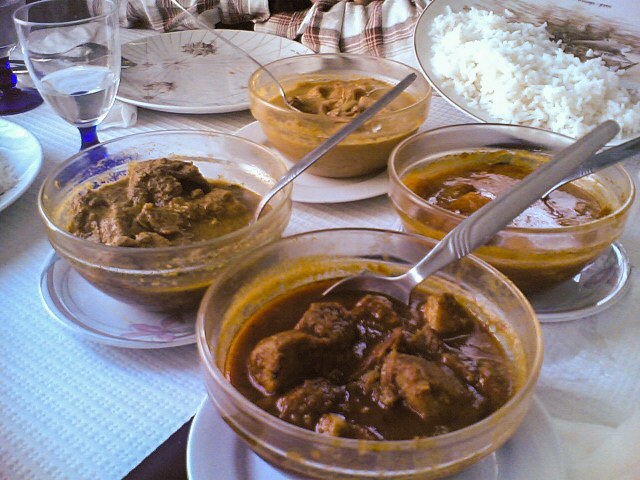
Pork vindaloo (pictured) is a popular curry dish in Goa and around the world.

The area has a tropical climate, which means the spices and flavours are intense. Use of kokum is a distinct feature of the region's cuisine.

Goan cuisine is mostly seafood and meat-based; the staple foods are rice and fish. Kingfish (vison or visvan) is the most common delicacy, and others include pomfret, shark, tuna, and mackerel; these are often served with coconut milk. Shellfish, including crabs, prawns, tiger prawns, lobster, squid, and mussels, are commonly eaten.

The cuisine of Goa is influenced by its Hindu origins, 400 years of Portuguese colonialism, and modern techniques.

Bread, introduced by the Portuguese, is very popular, and is an important part of the Goan breakfast, most frequently in the form of toast.

== Gujarat ==
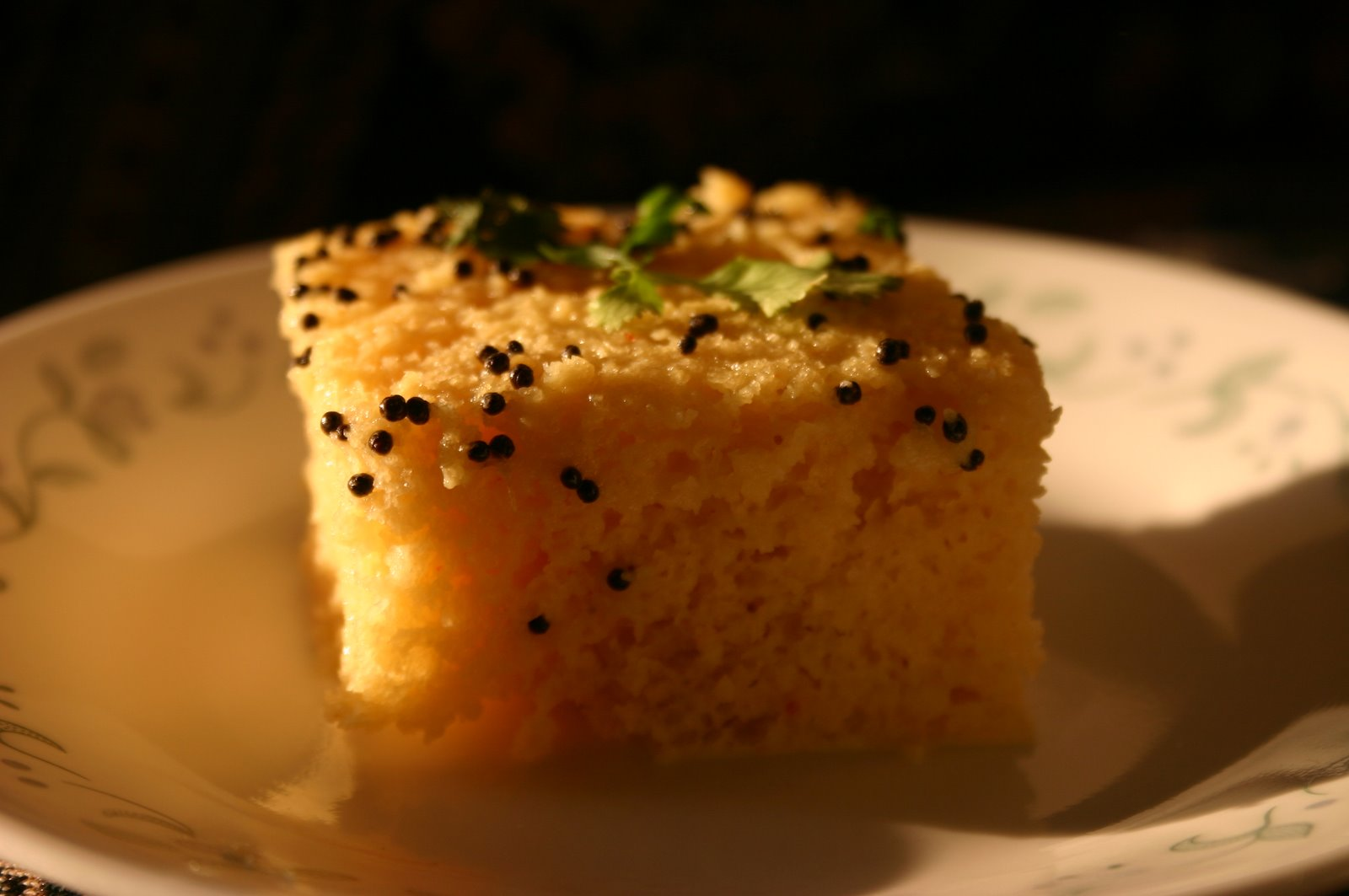
Khaman is a popular Gujarati snack

Gujarati cuisine is primarily vegetarian. The typical Gujarati thali consists of roti (rotlii in Gujarati), daal or kadhi, rice, sabzi/shaak, papad and chaas (buttermilk).

Sabzi is a dish of different combinations of vegetables and spices which may be stir fried, spicy or sweet. Gujarati cuisine can vary widely in flavour and heat based on personal and regional tastes. North Gujarat, Kathiawad, Kachchh, and South Gujarat are the four major regions of Gujarati cuisine.

Many Gujarati dishes are simultaneously sweet, salty (like handvo), and spicy. In mango season, keri no ras (fresh mango pulp) is often an integral part of the meal. Spices also vary seasonally. For example, garam masala is used much less in summer.

Gujarati snacks include sev khamani, khakhra, dal vada, methi na bhajiya, khaman, bhakharwadi and more.

Regular fasting, with diets limited to milk, dried fruit, and nuts, is a common practice,

== Haryana ==
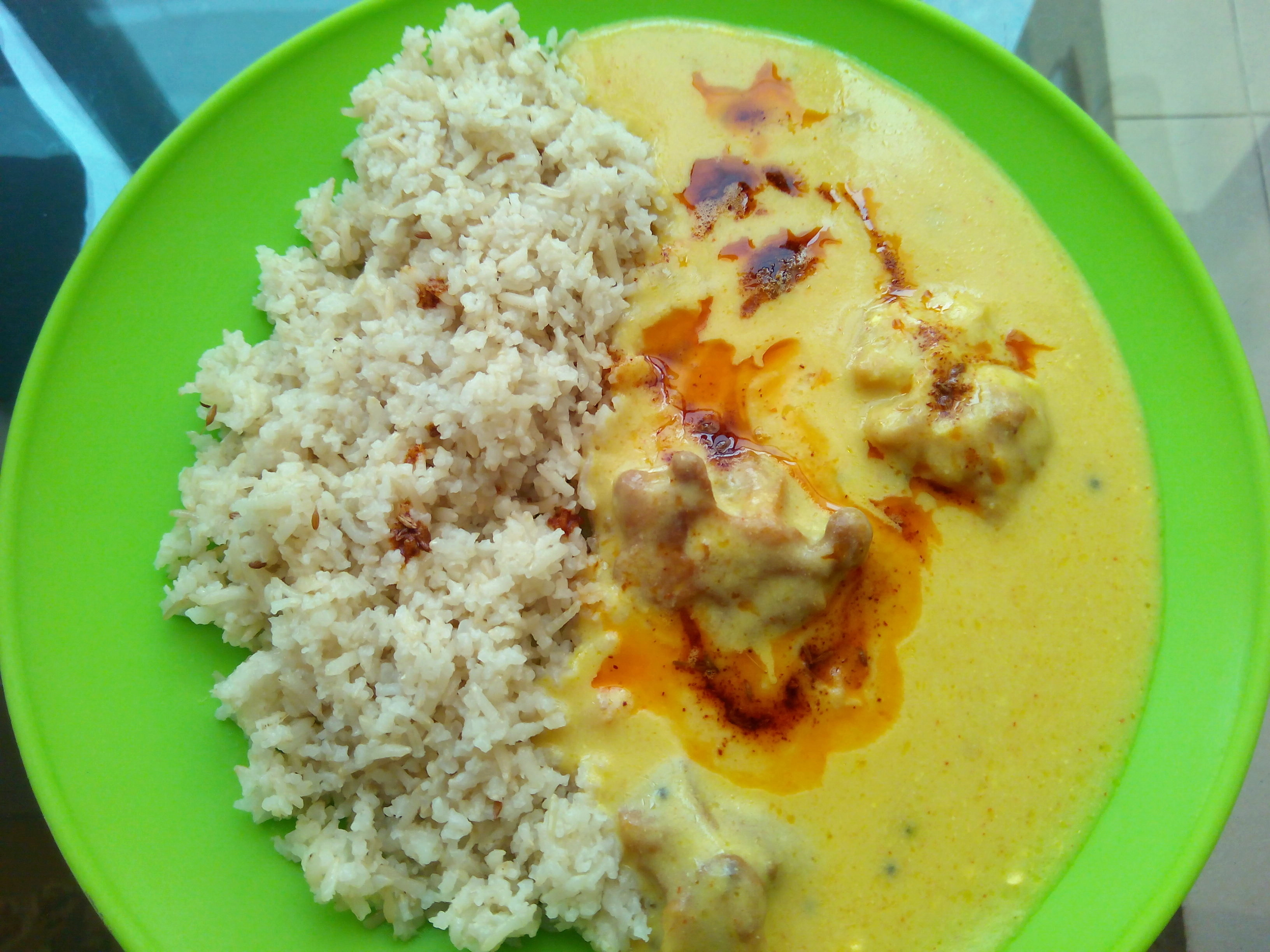
Kadhi is a Haryana dish.

Cattle being common in Haryana, dairy products are a common component of its cuisine.

Specific regional dishes include kadhi, pakora, besan masala roti, bajra aloo roti, churma, kheer, bathua raita, methi gajar, singri ki sabzi, and tomato chutney.

In the past, its staple diet included bajra khichdi, rabdi, onion chutney, and bajra ki roti. In non-vegetarian cuisine it includes kukad kadhai and chicken tikka masala.

Lassi, sharbat, nimbu pani and labsi (a mixture of bajra flour and lassi) are three popular non-alcoholic beverages in Haryana. However, liquor stores are common there, which cater to a large number of truck drivers.

== Himachal Pradesh ==
The daily diet of Himachal people is similar to that of the rest of North India, including lentils, broth, rice, vegetables, and bread, although non-vegetarian cuisine is preferred. Some of the specialities of Himachal include sidu, patande, chukh, rajmah, and til chutney.

== Jammu and Kashmir ==
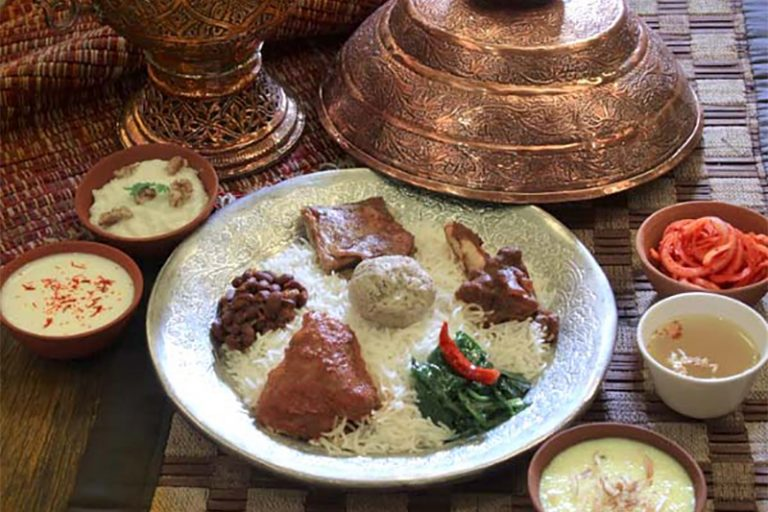
Wazwan

The cuisine of Jammu and Kashmir is from two regions of the state: Jammu division and Kashmir Valley. Kashmiri cuisine has evolved over hundreds of years. Its first major influence was the food of the Kashmiri Hindus and Buddhists.

The cuisine was later influenced by the cultures which arrived with the invasion of Kashmir by Timur from the area of modern Uzbekistan. Subsequent influences have included the cuisines of Central Asia and the North Indian plains.

The most notable ingredient in Kashmiri cuisine is mutton, of which over 30 varieties are known. Wazwan is a multicourse meal in the Kashmiri tradition, the preparation of which is considered an art.

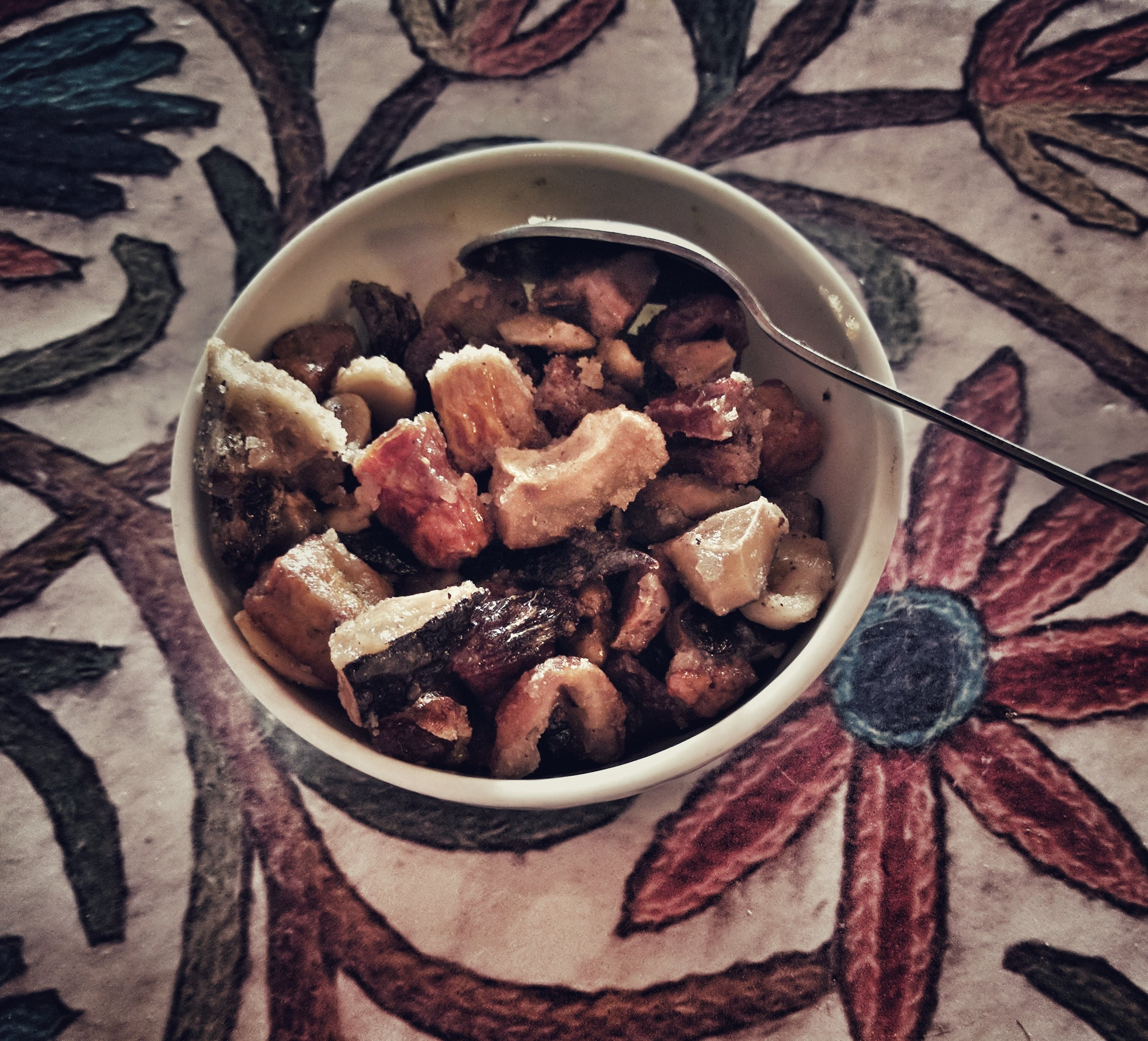
Shufta

Kashmiri pandit food is elaborate, and an important part of the Pandits' ethnic identity. Kashmiri pandit cuisine usually uses dahi (yogurt), oil, and spices such as turmeric, red chilli, cumin, ginger, and fennel, though they do not use onion and garlic. Birayanis are quite popular, and are the speciality of Kashmir.

The Jammu region is famous for its sund panjeeri, patisa, rajma with rice and Kalari cheese.

Dogri food includes ambal (sour pumpkin dish), khatta meat, kulthein di dal, dal chawal, maa da madra (black gram lentils in yogurt) and Uriya.

Many types of pickles are made including mango, kasrod, and girgle. Street food is also famous which include various types of chaats, specially gol gappas, gulgule, chole bhature, rajma kulcha and dahi bhalla.

== Jharkhand ==
Staple foods in Jharkhand are rice, dal and vegetables. Famous dishes include chirka roti, pittha, malpua, dhuska, arsa roti and litti chokha.

Local alcoholic drinks include handia, a rice beer, and mahua daru, made from flowers of the mahua tree (Madhuca longifolia).

== Karnataka ==
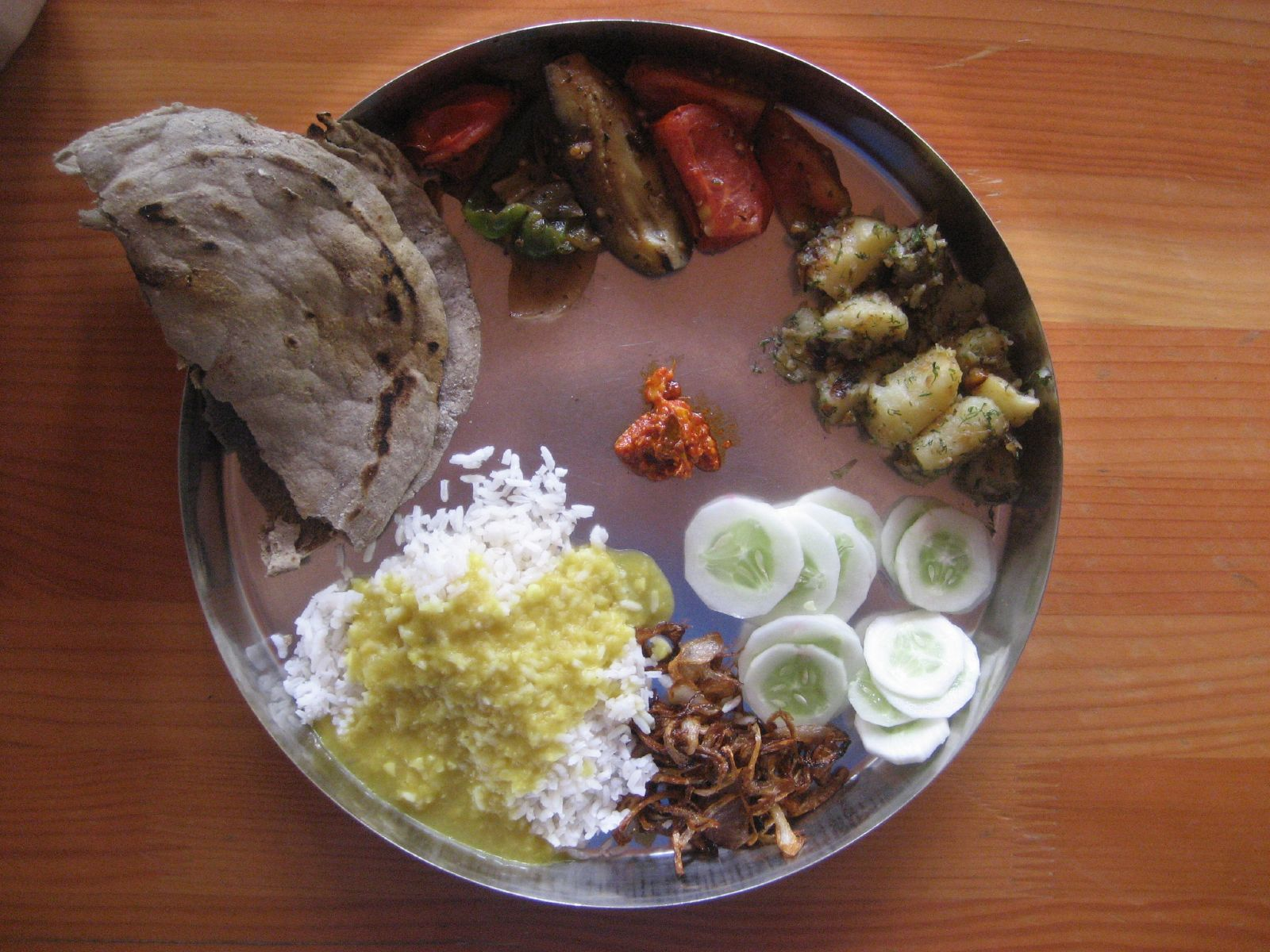
Staple vegetarian meal of Karnataka is jolada rotti, palya, and anna-saaru.

A number of dishes, such as idli, rava idli, Mysore masala dosa, etc., were invented here and have become popular beyond the state of Karnataka. Equally, varieties in the cuisine of Karnataka have similarities with its three neighbouring South Indian states, as well as the states of Maharashtra and Goa to its north. It is very common for the food to be served on a banana leaf, especially during festivals and functions.

Karnataka cuisine can be very broadly divided into Mysore/Bangalore cuisine, North Karnataka cuisine, Udupi cuisine, Kodagu/Coorg cuisine, Karavali/coastal cuisine, and Saraswat cuisine. Catholic Christians from Mangalore have their distinct cuisine featuring coconut, spices, and a distinct Portuguese influence.

This cuisine covers a wide spectrum of food from pure vegetarian and vegan to meats like pork, and from savouries to sweets.

Typical dishes include bisi bele bath, jolada rotti, badanekai yennegai, holige, kadubu, chapati, idli vada, ragi rotti, akki rotti, saaru, huli, kootu, vangibath, khara bath, kesari bhath, sajjige, neer dosa, mysoore, haal bai, chiroti, benne dose, majjige huli, ragi mudde, and uppittu.

The Kodagu district is known for spicy pork curries, while coastal Karnataka specialises in seafood. Although the ingredients differ regionally, a typical Kannadiga oota (Kannadiga meal) is served on a banana leaf. The coastal districts of Dakshina Kannada and Udupi have slightly varying cuisines, which make extensive use of coconut in curries and frequently include seafood.

== Kerala ==
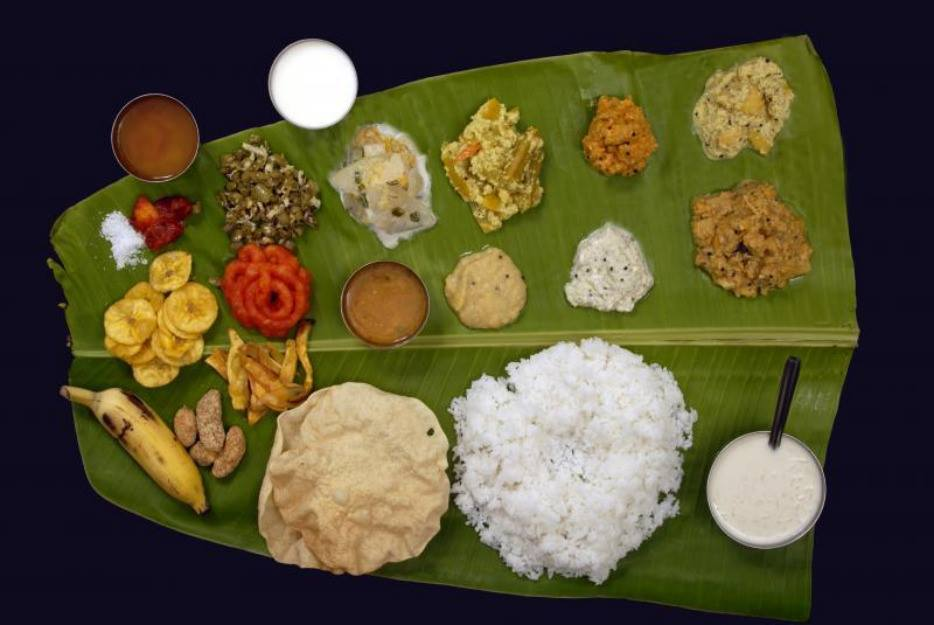
A traditional Kerala Sadhya

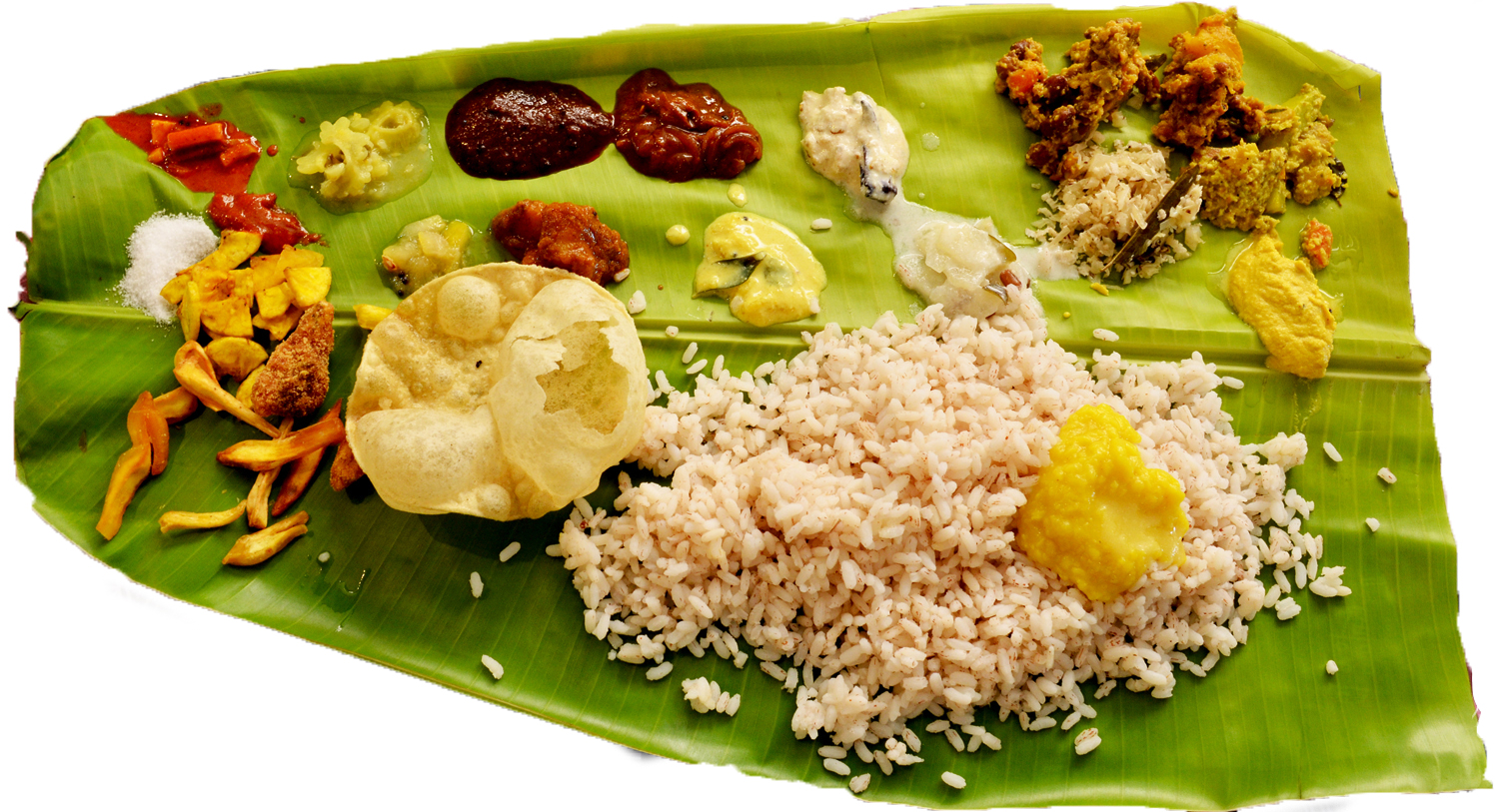
A typical sadhya, where banana leaves are used as plates

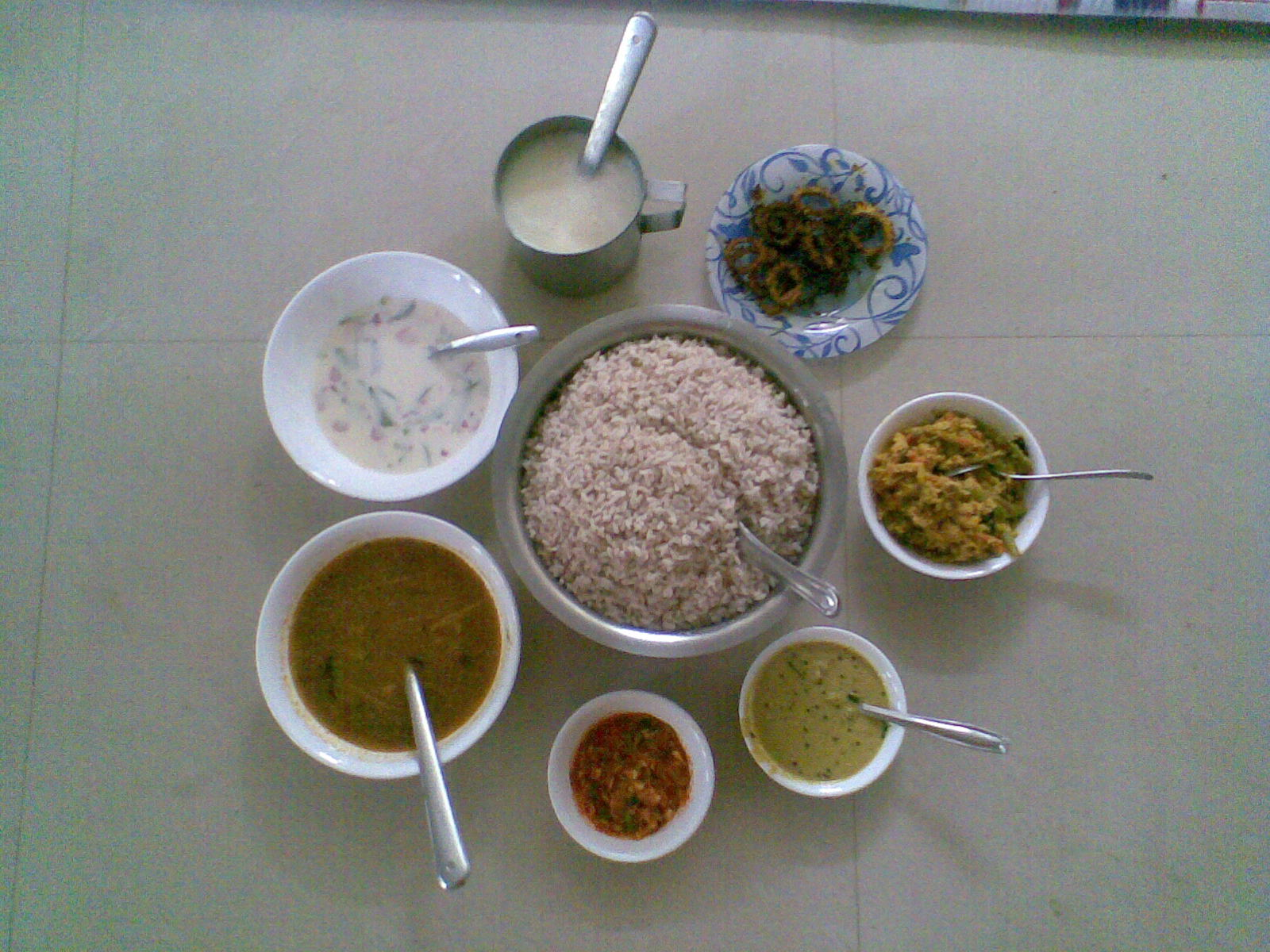
Sadhya items ready to be served. Clockwise from top: paayasam or pradhaman, bitter gourd thoran, aviyal, kaalan, lime pickle, sambar, and buttermilk with boiled rice in center

Contemporary Kerala food includes vegetarian and non-vegetarian dishes. Fish and seafood play a major role in Kerala cuisine, as Kerala is a coastal state. An everyday Kerala meal in most households consists of rice with fish curry made of sardines, mackerel, seer fish, king fish, pomfret, prawns, shrimp, sole, anchovy, or parrotfish, (mussels, oysters, crabs, squid, scallops are not rare), and vegetable curry and stir-fried vegetables with or without coconut traditionally known as thoran or mizhukkupiratti. As Kerala has large number of inland water bodies, freshwater fish are also abundant, and part of regular meals. It is common in Kerala to have a breakfast with non-vegetarian dishes in restaurants, in contrast to other states in India. Chicken or mutton stews, lamb, chicken, beef, pork, egg curry, and fish curry with tapioca for breakfast are also widely enjoyed.

Kerala cuisine reflects its rich trading heritage. Over time, various cuisines have blended with indigenous dishes, while foreign ones have been adapted to local tastes. Significant Arab, Syrian, Portuguese, Dutch, Jewish, and Middle Eastern influences exist in this region's cuisine.

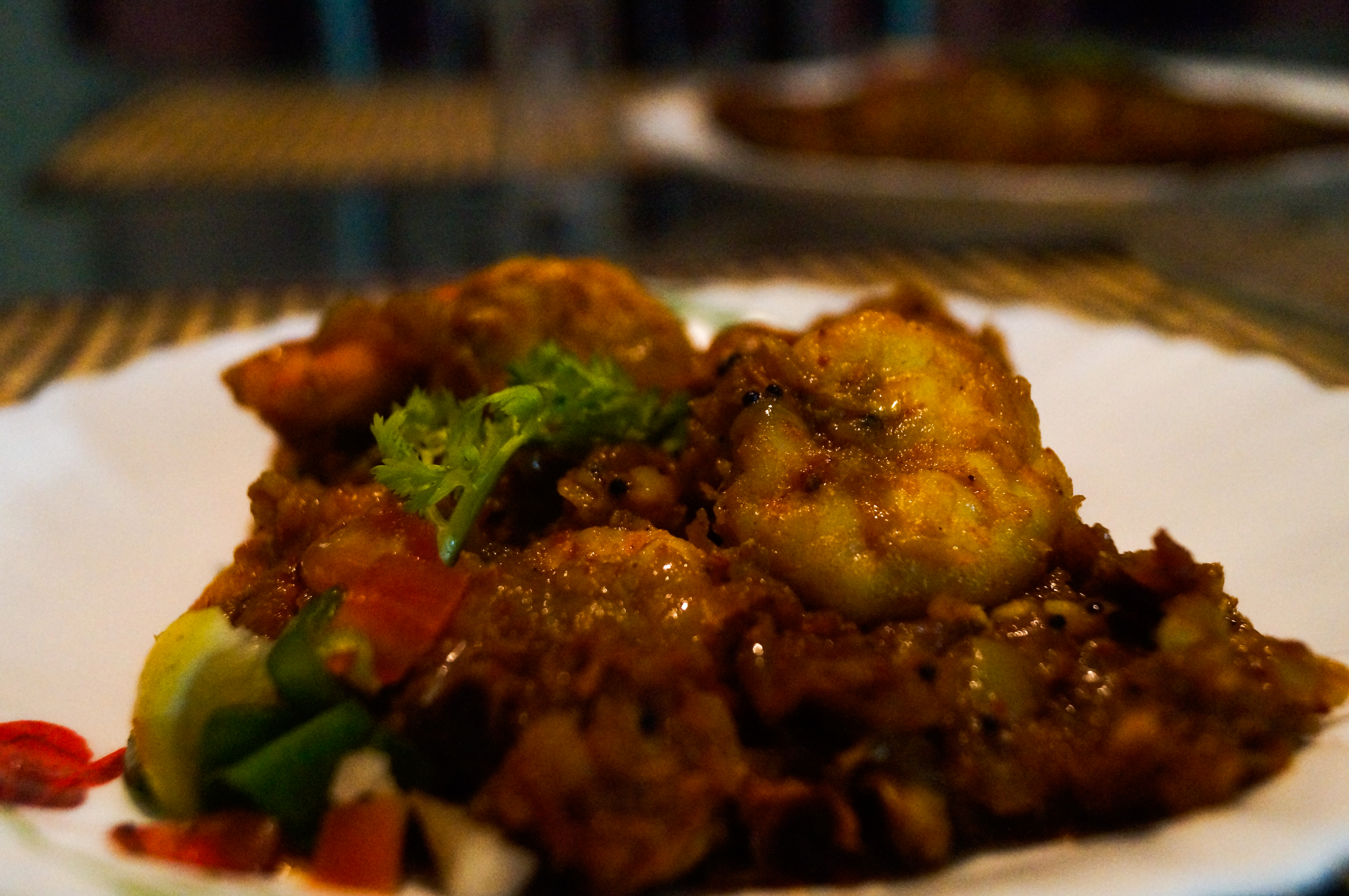
Kerala style prawns roast–Kerala being a coastal state has different varieties of sea food preparations

Coconuts grow in abundance in Kerala, so grated coconut and coconut milk are commonly used for thickening and flavouring. Kerala's long coastline and numerous rivers have led to a strong fishing industry in the state, making seafood a common part of the meal. Starchy food like Rice and tapioca forms the major part of Kerala's staple food. Having been a major region of spice cultivation and trade for thousands of years, the spices like black pepper, cardamom, clove, ginger, cumin and cinnamon finds extensive use in Kerala cuisine. Kerala sadhya, an elaborate vegetarian banquet prepared for festivals and ceremonies. A full-course sadhya, which consists of rice with about 20 different accompaniments and desserts is the ceremonial meal, eaten usually on celebrations such as marriages, Onam, Vishu, etc. and is served on a plantain leaf.

Most of Kerala's Hindus, except its Brahmin community, eats fish, chicken, beef, pork, eggs, and mutton. The Brahmin are famed for their vegan cuisine, especially varieties of sambar and rasam. A thick vegetable stew popular in South and Central India called avial is believed to have originated in southern Kerala. The avial, eaten widely in the state, is an important vegetarian dish in Kerala sadya. In most Kerala households, a typical meal consists of rice served along with vegetables and fish or meat dishes. Kerala also has a variety of breakfast dishes like idli, dosa, appam, idiyappam, puttu, parotta and pathiri served with sambar, coconut chutney, mutta curry (egg curry), kadala (chickpea) curry, green peas, chicken curry, beef curry and mutton curry.

The Muslim community of Kerala blend Arabian, North Indian, and indigenous Malabari cuisines, using chicken, eggs, beef, and mutton. Thalassery biryani is the only biryani variant, which is of Kerala origin having originated in Talassery, in Malabar region. The dish is significantly different from other biryani variants. Snacks like Pazham nirachathu, Unnakkai, Bread pola— made of bread, eggs, milk and a simple masala, Iftar preparations like Thari kanji, Kozhi pichuporichathu (shredded chicken), Pidi— a preparation of rice dumplings dunked in gravy,Irachi pathiri, Chatti pathiri, Meen pathiri, Neriya pathiri and Kannu vecha pathiri – roti varieties usually made of powdered rice, dishes like Kaai curry etc., are also contributions of Muslim community to the broad Kerala cuisine. The Pathanamthitta region is known for raalan and fish curries. Appam along with wine and curries of duck, pork and cured beef are popular among Syrian Christians in Central Kerala.

Popular desserts are payasam (pudding) and halwa. Payasam, especially Ambalappuzha Paalpayasam also known as Gopala Kashayam (Krishnan's potion) prepared at the 17th century Ambalappuzha Sri Krishna swami temple, is a delicacy known for its unique and flavourful taste. Interestingly, on each day the paalpayasam is prepared only after (ritualistically) seeking due permission from the presiding deity – Shri Krishna. Kerala has a number of paayasam varieties including but not limited to Paalpayasam, Vermicelli Payasam, Pradhaman, Ada Pradhaman, Chakka (Jackfruit) Pradhaman, Parippu Paayasam and more. Paayasam like Vermicelli Payasam (Semiya payasam) also finds a place in Iftar feast of Muslim communities in Kerala.

Halva is one of the most commonly found or easily recognised sweets in bakeries throughout Kerala, and originated from the Gujarathi community in Calicut. Europeans used to call the dish "sweetmeat" due to its texture, and a street in Kozhikode where became named Sweet Meat Street during colonial rule. This is mostly made from maida (highly refined wheat), and comes in various flavours, such as banana, ghee or coconut. However, karutha haluva (black haluva) made from rice is also very popular.

== Ladakh ==
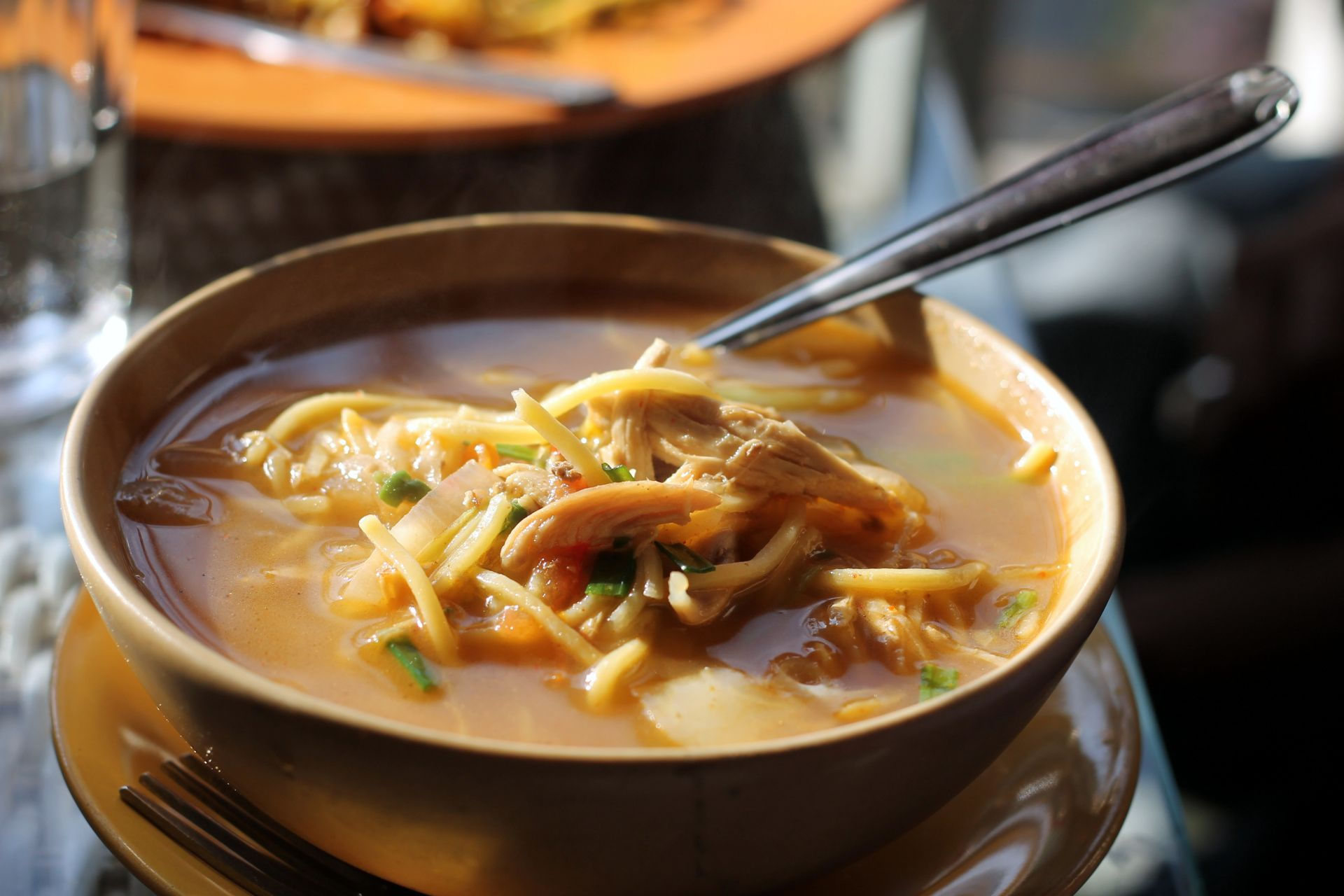
Thukpa is popular in Ladakh, Himachal Pradesh and North-East India.

Ladakhi cuisine is from the two districts of Leh and Kargil in the union territory of Ladakh. Ladakhi food has much in common with Tibetan food, the most prominent foods being thukpa (noodle soup) and tsampa, known in Ladakhi as ngampe (roasted barley flour). Edible without cooking, tsampa makes useful trekking food.

Strictly Ladakhi dishes include skyu and chutagi, both heavy and rich soup pasta dishes, skyu being made with root vegetables and meat, and chutagi with leafy greens and vegetables. As Ladakh moves toward a cash-based economy, foods from the plains of India are becoming more common.

As in other parts of Central Asia, tea in Ladakh is traditionally made with strong green tea, butter, and salt. It is mixed in a large churn and known as gurgur cha, after the sound it makes when mixed. Sweet tea (cha ngarmo) is common now, made in the Indian style with milk and sugar. Most of the surplus barley that is produced is fermented into chang, an alcoholic beverage drunk especially on festive occasions.

== Lakshadweep ==
The cuisine of Lakshadweep prominently features seafood and coconut. Local food consists of spicy non-vegetarian and vegetarian dishes.

The culinary influence of Kerala is quite evident in the cuisines of Lakshadweep, since the island lies in close proximity to Kerala. Coconut and sea fish serve as the foundation of most meals.

The people of Lakshadweep drink large amounts of coconut water, which is the most abundant aerated drink on the island. Coconut milk is the base for most of the curries. All the sweet or savoury dishes have a touch of famous Malabar spices. Local people also prefer to have dosa, idlis, and various rice dishes.

== Madhya Pradesh ==
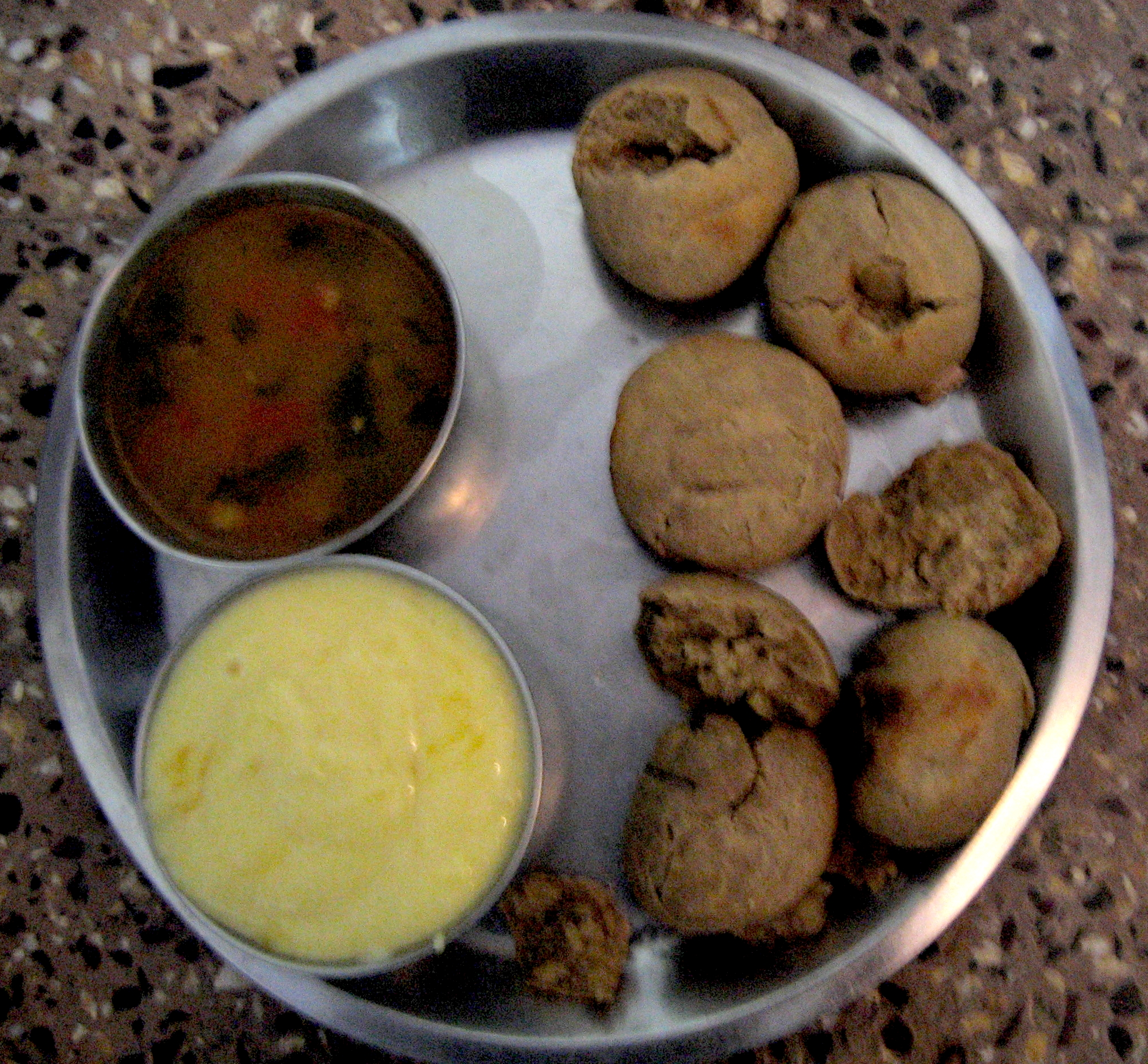
Daal bafla, a popular dish in Madhya Pradesh, Rajasthan, and Gujarat

The cuisine in Madhya Pradesh varies regionally. Wheat and meat are common in the north and west of the state, while the wetter south and east are dominated by rice and fish. Milk is a common ingredient in Gwalior and Indore.

The street food of Indore is well known, with shops that have been active for generations. Bhopal is known for meat and fish dishes such as rogan josh, korma, qeema, biryani, pilaf, and kebabs. On a street named Chatori Gali in old Bhopal, one can find traditional Muslim nonvegetarian fare such as paya soup, bun kabab, and nalli-nihari as some of the specialties.

Dal bafla is a common meal in the region and can be easily found in Indore and other nearby regions, consisting of a steamed and grilled wheat cake dunked in rich ghee, which is eaten with daal and ladoos.

The culinary specialty of the Malwa and Indore regions of central Madhya Pradesh is poha (flattened rice); usually eaten at breakfast with jalebi.

Beverages in the region include lassi, beer, rum and sugarcane juice. A local liquor is distilled from the flowers of the mahua tree. Date palm toddy is also popular. In tribal regions, a popular drink is the sap of the sulfi tree, which may be alcoholic if it has fermented.

== Maharashtra ==
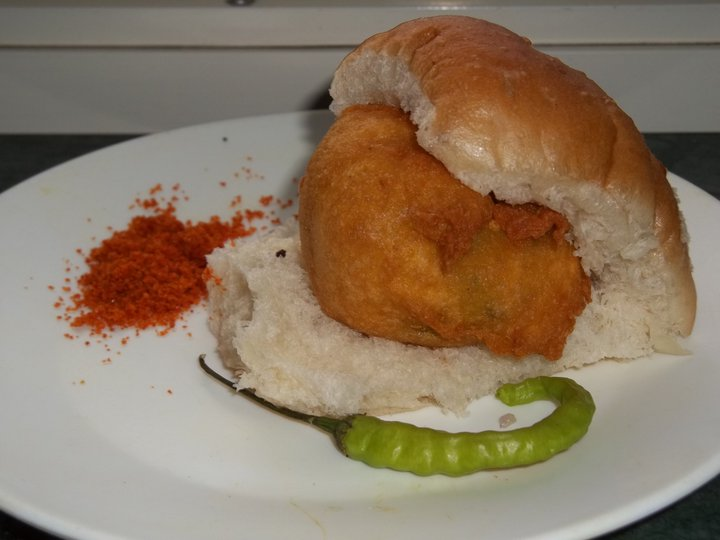
Vada pav

Maharashtrian cuisine is an extensive balance of many different tastes. It includes a range of dishes from mild to very spicy tastes. Bajri, wheat, rice, jowar, vegetables, lentils, and fruit form important components of the Maharashtrian diet.

Popular dishes include puran poli, ukdiche modak, batata wada, sabudana khichdi, masala bhat, pav bhaji, and wada pav. Poha or flattened rice is also usually eaten at breakfast. Kanda poha and aloo poha are some of the dishes cooked for breakfast and snacking in evenings.

Popular spicy meat dishes include those that originated in the Kolhapur region. These are the Kolhapuri Sukka mutton, pandhra rassa, and tabmda rassa. Shrikhand, a sweet dish made from strained yogurt, is a main dessert of Maharashtrian cuisine.

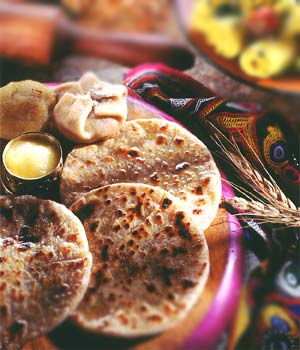
Puran poli

The cuisine of Maharashtra can be divided into two major sections, the coastal and the interior. The Konkan, on the coast of the Arabian Sea, has its own type of cuisine, a homogeneous combination of Malvani, Goud Saraswat Brahmin, and Goan cuisine. In the interior of Maharashtra, the Paschim Maharashtra, Khandesh, Vidarbha and Marathwada areas have their own distinct cuisines.

The cuisine of Vidarbha uses groundnuts, poppy seeds, jaggery, wheat, jowar, and bajra extensively. A typical meal consists of rice, roti, poli, or bhakar, along with varan and aamtee—lentils and spiced vegetables. Cooking is common with different types of oil.

Savji cuisine originates from the Vidarbha region of Maharashtra. Savji dishes are known for their spicy flavor and use of oil. Mutton curries are a prominent dish in Savji cuisine.

Like other coastal states, an enormous variety of vegetables, fish, and coconuts exists, where they are common ingredients. Peanuts and cashews are often served with vegetables. Grated coconuts are used to flavour many types of dishes, but coconut oil is not widely used; peanut oil is preferred.

Kokum, most commonly served chilled, in an appetiser-digestive called sol kadhi, is prevalent. During summer, Maharashtrians consume panha, a drink made from raw mango.

== Manipur ==
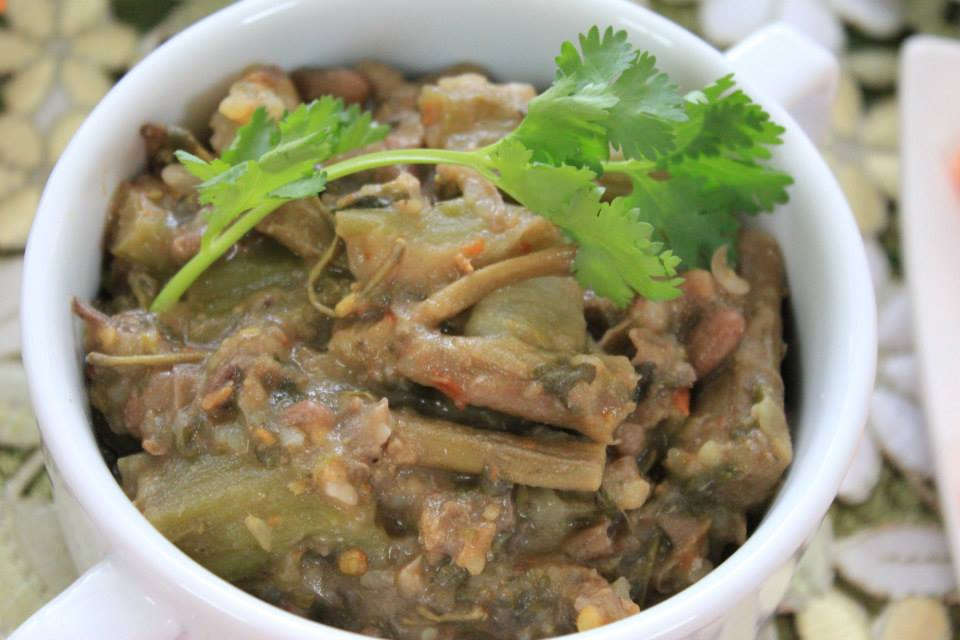
Eromba, here vegetarian, is a popular Manipuri dish.

Manipuri cuisine is represented by the cuisine of the Meitei people who form the majority population in the central plain. Meitei food are simple, tasty, organic and healthy. Rice with local seasonal vegetables and fish form the main diet.

Most of the dishes are cooked like vegetable stew, flavoured with either fermented fish called ngari, or dried and smoked fish.

The most popular Manipuri dish is eromba, a preparation of boiled and mashed vegetables, often including carrots, potatoes or beans, mixed with chilli and roasted fermented fish.

Another popular dish is the savoury cake called paknam, made of a lentil flour stuffed with various ingredients such as banana inflorescence, mushrooms, fish, vegetables etc., and baked covered in turmeric leaves.

Along with spicy dishes, a mild side dish of steamed or boiled sweet vegetables are often served in the daily meals. The Manipuri salad dish called singju, made of finely julienned cabbage, green papaya, and other vegetables, and garnished with local herbs, toasted sesame powder and lentil flour is extremely popular locally, and often found sold in small street side vendors.

Singju is often served with bora, which are fritters of various kinds, and also kanghou, or oil-fried spicy veggies. Cooked and fermented soybean is a popular condiment in all Manipuri kitchens.

The staple diet of Manipur consists of rice, fish, large varieties of leafy vegetables (of both aquatic and terrestrial). Manipuris typically raise vegetables in a kitchen garden and rear fishes in small ponds around their house. Since the vegetables are either grown at home or obtained from local market, the cuisines are very seasonal, each season having its own special vegetables and preparations.

The taste is very different from mainland Indian cuisines because of the use of various aromatic herbs and roots that are peculiar to the region. They are however very similar to the cuisines of Southeast, East, and Central Asia, Siberia, Micronesia and Polynesia.

== Meghalaya ==
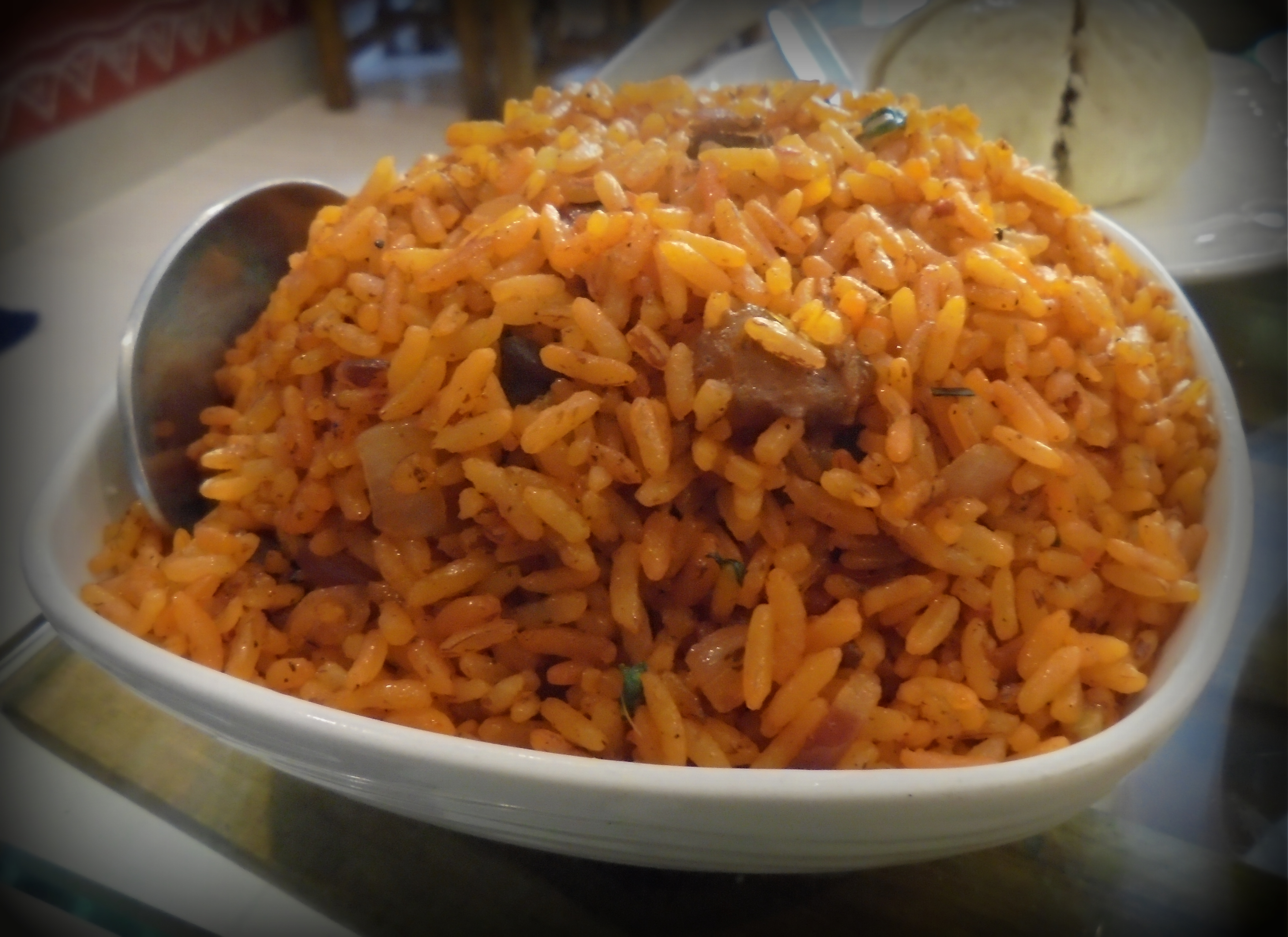
Jadoh with mutton is characteristic of Meghalayan cuisine.

Meghalayan cuisine is unique and different from other Northeastern Indian states. Spiced meat is common, from goats, pigs, fowl, ducks, chickens, and cows. In the Khasi and Jaintia Hills districts, common foods include jadoh, ki kpu, tung-rymbai, and pickled bamboo shoots.

Other common foods in Meghalaya include minil songa (steamed sticky rice) and sakkin gata.

Like other tribes in the northeast, the Garos ferment rice beer, which they consume in religious rites and secular celebrations.

== Mizoram ==
The cuisine of Mizoram differs from that of most of India, though it shares characteristics to other regions of Northeast India and North India.

Rice is the staple food of Mizoram, while Mizos love to add non-vegetarian ingredients in every dish. Fish, chicken, pork and beef are popular meats among Mizos. Dishes are served on fresh banana leaves. Most of the dishes are cooked in mustard oil.

Meals tend to be less spicy than in most of India. Mizos love eating boiled vegetables along with rice. A popular dish is bai, made from boiling vegetables (spinach, eggplant, beans, and other leafy vegetables) with bekang (fermented soya beans) or sa-um, fermented pork fat served with rice. Sawhchiar is another common dish, made of rice and cooked with pork or chicken.

== Nagaland ==
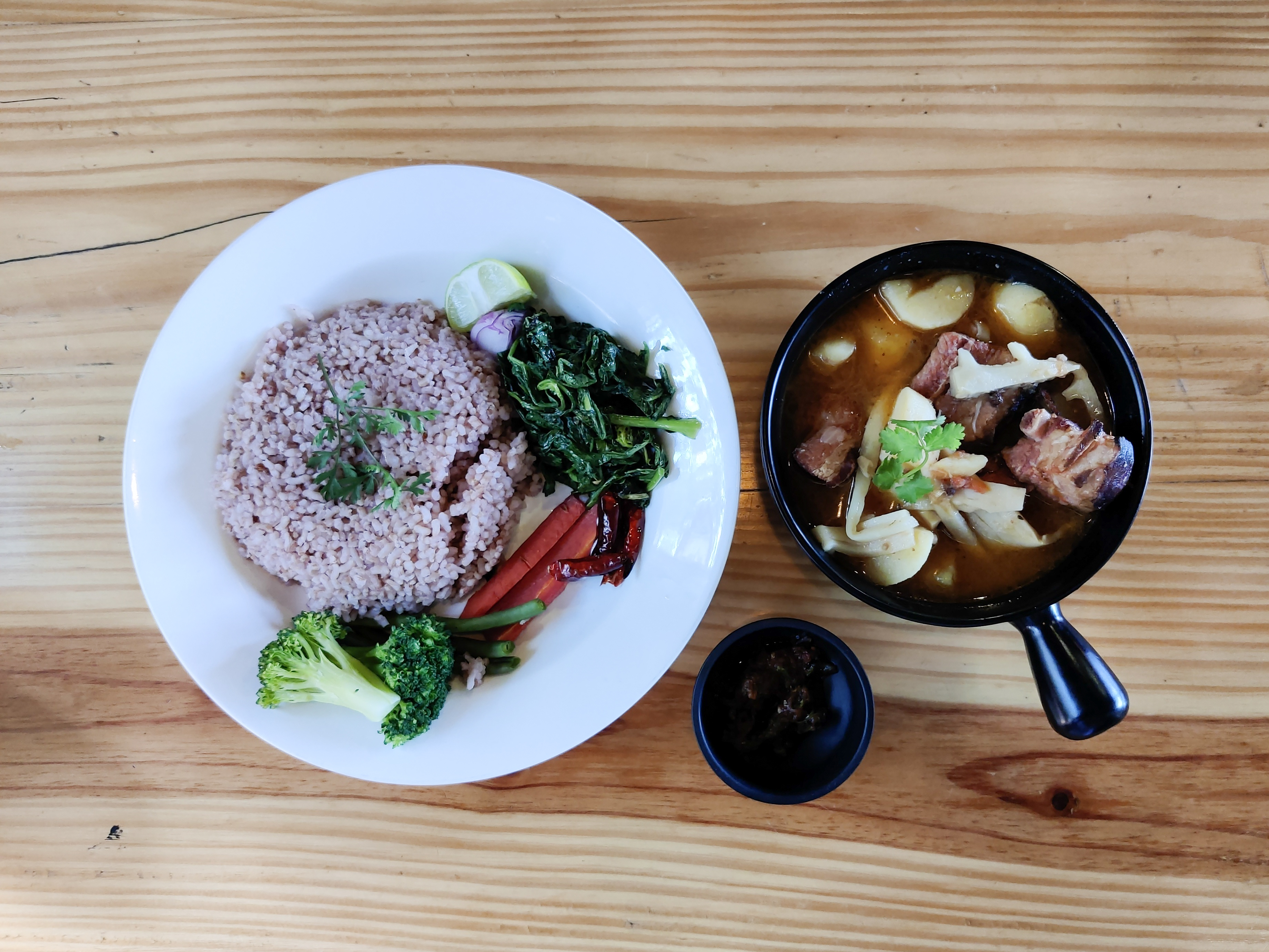
Naga style smoked Pork ribs with bamboo shoots and rice

The cuisine of Nagaland reflects that of the Naga people. It is known for exotic pork meats cooked with simple and flavourful ingredients, like the extremely hot bhut jolokia (ghost chilli) pepper, fermented bamboo shoots, and akhuni (fermented soya beans). Another unique and strong ingredient used by the Naga people, is the fermented fish known as ngari.

Fresh herbs and other local greens also feature prominently in the Naga cuisine. The Naga use oil sparingly, preferring to ferment, dry, and smoke their meats and fish.

Traditional homes in Nagaland have external kitchens that serve as smokehouses.

A typical meal consists of rice, meat, a chutney, a couple of stewed or steamed vegetable dishes, flavoured with ngari or akhuni. Desserts usually consist of fresh fruits.

== Odisha ==
The cuisine of Odisha relies heavily on local ingredients. Flavours are usually subtle and delicately spiced. Fish and other seafood, such as crab and shrimp, are very popular, and chicken and mutton are also consumed.

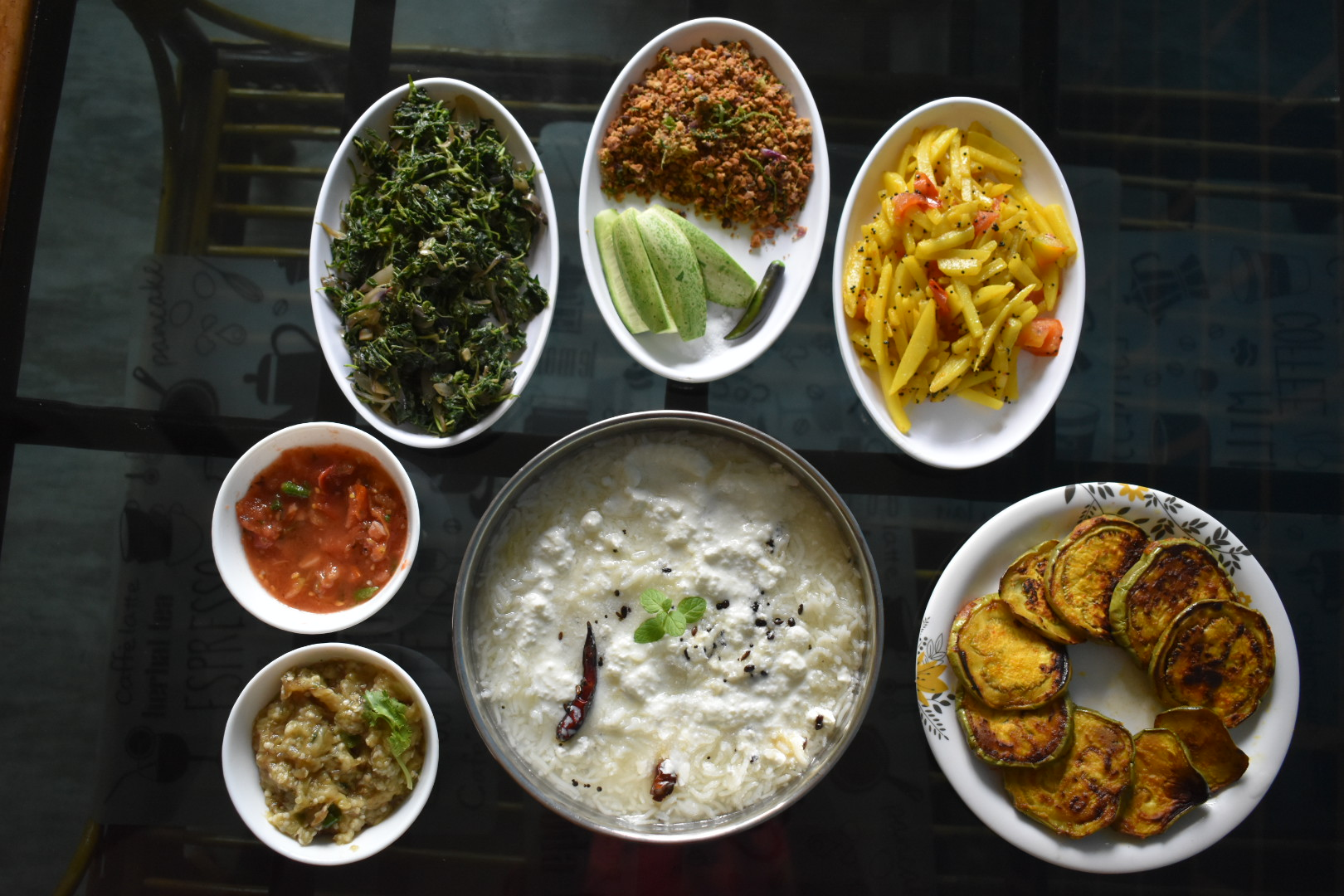
Pakhala Platter

Pakhala, a dish made of rice, water, and dahi (yogurt), that is fermented overnight, is very popular in summer in rural areas. Odias are very fond of sweets, so dessert follows most meals.

Panch phutana, a mix of cumin, mustard, fennel, fenugreek and kalonji (nigella), is widely used for flavouring vegetables and dals, while garam masala and turmeric are commonly used for meat-based curries.

Popular Odia dishes include arna, kanika, dalma, khata (tamato and oou), dali (different types of lentils, i.e. harada [red gram], muga [green gram], kolatha [horsegram], etc.), spinach and other green leaves, and alu-bharta (mashed potato) along with pakhala.

Odisha and neighbouring West Bengal both claim to be the origin of rasgulla, each state having a geographical indication for their regional variety of the dessert. Odisha is also known for its chhena- based sweets, including chhena poda, chhena gaja, chhena jhili, and rasabali.

== Puducherry ==
The union territory of Puducherry was a French colony for around 200 years, making French cuisine a strong influence on the area. Tamil cuisine is eaten by the territory's Tamil majority. The influence of the neighbouring areas, such as Andhra Pradesh and Kerala, is also visible on the territory's cuisine.

Some favourite dishes include coconut curry, tandoori potato, soya dosa, podanlangkai (snake gourd chutney), curried vegetables, stuffed cabbage, and baked beans.

== Punjab ==
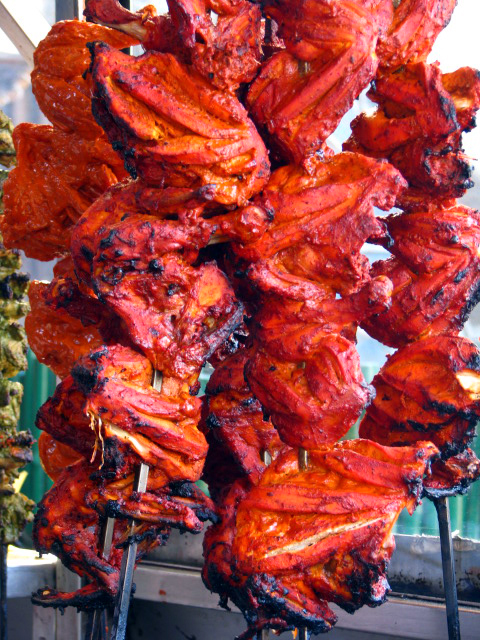
Tandoori chicken is a popular grilled dish in Punjab.

The cuisine of Punjab is known for its diverse range of dishes. It is closely related to the cuisine of the neighbouring Punjab province of Pakistan.

The state, being an agriculture centre, is abundant with whole grains, vegetables, and fruits. Home-cooked and restaurant Punjabi cuisine can vary significantly.

Restaurant-style Punjabi cooking puts emphasis on creamy textured foods by using ghee, butter and cream, while home-cooked meals centre around whole wheat, rice, and other ingredients flavoured with various kinds of masalas.

Common dishes cooked at home are roti with daal and dahi (yogurt) with a side chutney and salad that includes raw onion, tomato, cucumber, etc.

The meals are also abundant of local and seasonal vegetables usually sautéed with spices such as cumin, dried coriander, red chilli powder, turmeric, black cloves, etc. Masala chai is a favourite drink and is consumed in everyday life and at special occasions.

Many regional differences exist in the Punjabi cuisine based on traditional variations in cooking similar dishes, food combinations, preference of spice combination, etc. It is clear that "the food is simple, robust, and closely linked to the land."

Certain dishes exclusive to Punjab, such as makki di roti and sarson da saag, dal makhani, and others are a favourite of many.

The masala in a Punjabi dish traditionally consists of onion, garlic, ginger, cumin, garam masala, salt, turmeric, tomatoes sauteed in mustard oil. Tandoori food is a Punjabi specialty. Dishes like Bhatti da murgh also known as tandoori chicken, Chicken hariyali kabab, Achari paneer tikka, fish ajwaini tikka and Amritsari kulcha are some popular tandoori foods from Punjab.

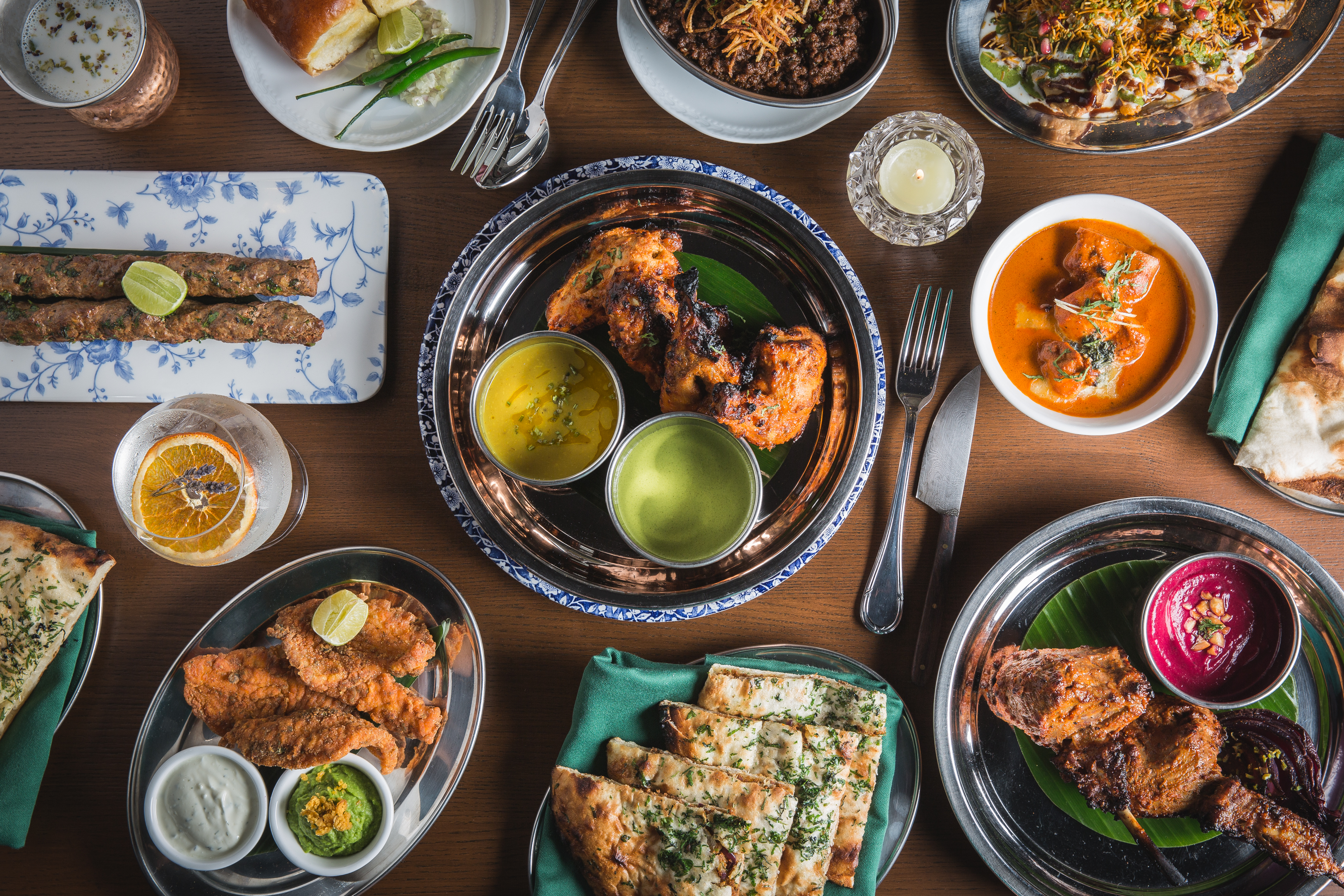
Punjabi platter.

Common meat dishes in this region are Bhakra curry (goat) and fish dishes. Dairy products are regularly enjoyed and usually accompany main meals in the form of dahi, milk, and milk-derived products such as lassi, paneer, and more.

Punjab has a large number of people following the Sikh religion who traditionally follow a vegetarian diet (which includes plant-derived foods, milk, and milk by-products. See diet in Sikhism) in accordance to their beliefs.

No description of Punjabi cuisine is complete without the myriad of famous desserts, such as kheer, gajar ka halwa, sooji (cream of wheat) halwa, rasmalai, gulab jamun and jalebi. Most desserts are ghee or dairy-based, use nuts such as almonds, walnuts, pistachios, cashews, and, raisins.

Many of the most popular elements of Anglo-Indian cuisine, such as tandoori foods, naan, pakoras and vegetable dishes with paneer, are derived from Punjabi styles.

Punjabi food is well known for its use of spices and produce, as a result, it is one of the most popular cuisines from the sub-continent. Dishes such as chhole bhature and chhole kulche are well known throughout North India.

== Rajasthan ==
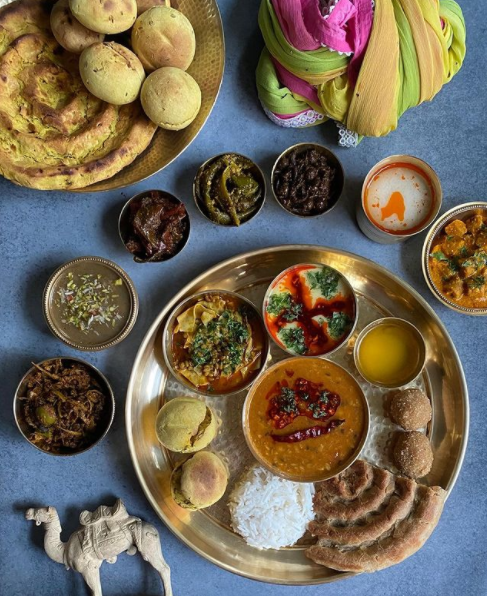
Rajasthani thali

Cooking in Rajasthan, an arid region, has been strongly shaped by the availability of ingredients. Food is generally cooked in milk or ghee, making it quite rich. Gram flour is a mainstay of Marwari food mainly due to the scarcity of vegetables in the area.

Historically, food that could last for several days and be eaten without heating was preferred. Major dishes of a Rajasthani meal may include daal-baati, tarfini, raabdi, ghevar, bail-gatte, panchkoota, chaavadi, laapsi, kadhi and boondi. Typical snacks include bikaneri bhujia, mirchi bada, pyaaj kachori, and dal kachori.

Daal-baati is the most popular dish prepared in the state. It is usually supplemented with choorma, a mixture of finely ground baked rotis, sugar and ghee.

Rajasthan is also influenced by the Rajput community who have liking for meat dishes. Their diet consisted of game meat and gave birth to dishes like laal maans, safed maas, khad khargosh and jungli maas.

== Sikkim ==
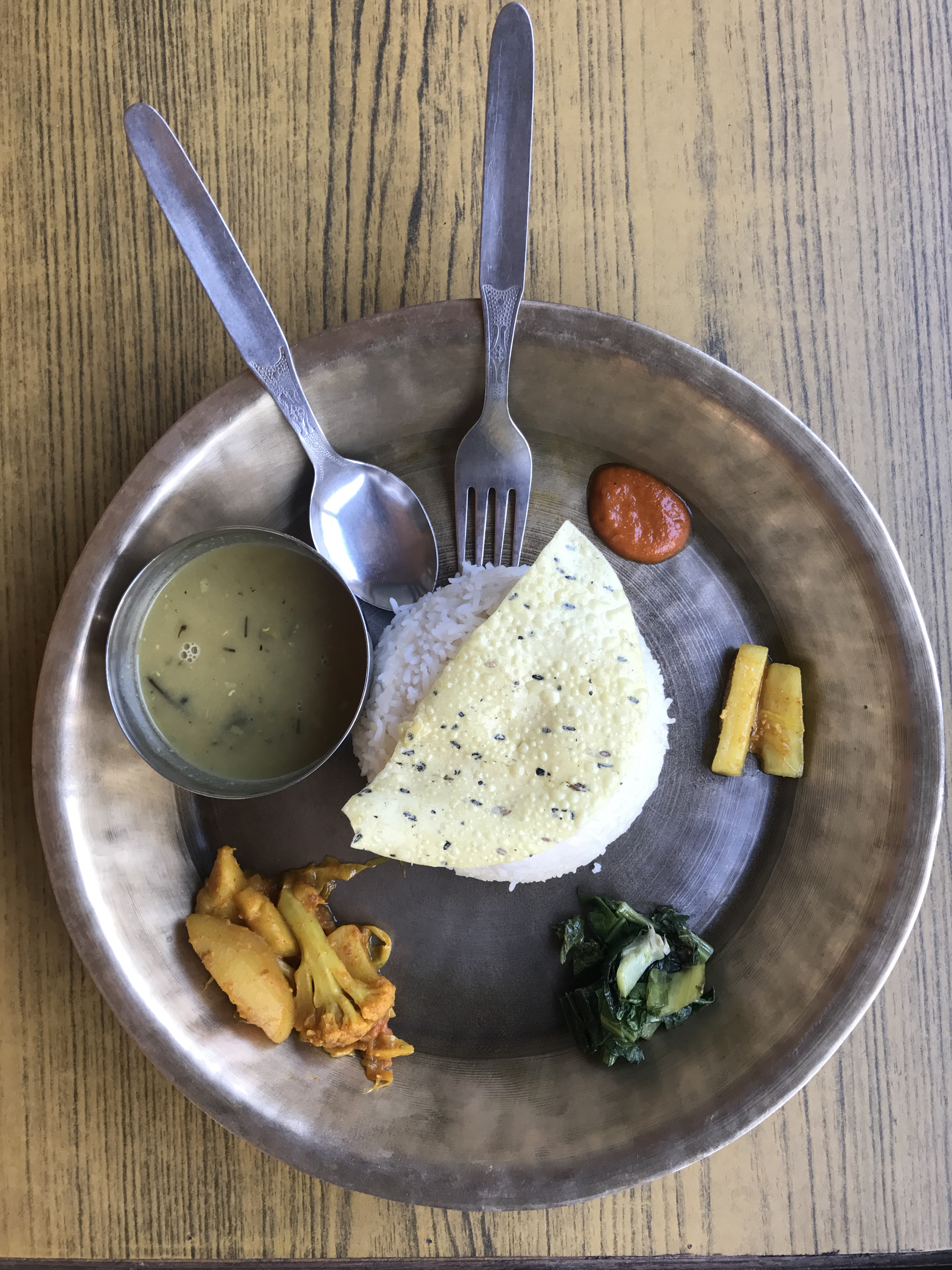
Nepalese-style dal bhat is popular in Sikkim.

In Sikkim, various ethnic groups such as the Nepalese, Bhutias, and Lepchas have their own distinct cuisines. Nepalese cuisine is very popular in this area.

Rice is the staple food of the area, and meat and dairy products are also widely consumed. For centuries, traditional fermented foods and beverages have constituted about 20 percent of the local diet.

Depending on altitudinal variation, finger millet, wheat, buckwheat, barley, vegetables, potatoes, and soybeans are grown. Dhindo, daal bhat, gundruk, momo, gya thuk, ningro, phagshapa, and sel roti are some of the local dishes.

Alcoholic drinks are consumed by both men and women. Beef is eaten by Bhutias.

== Sindh ==
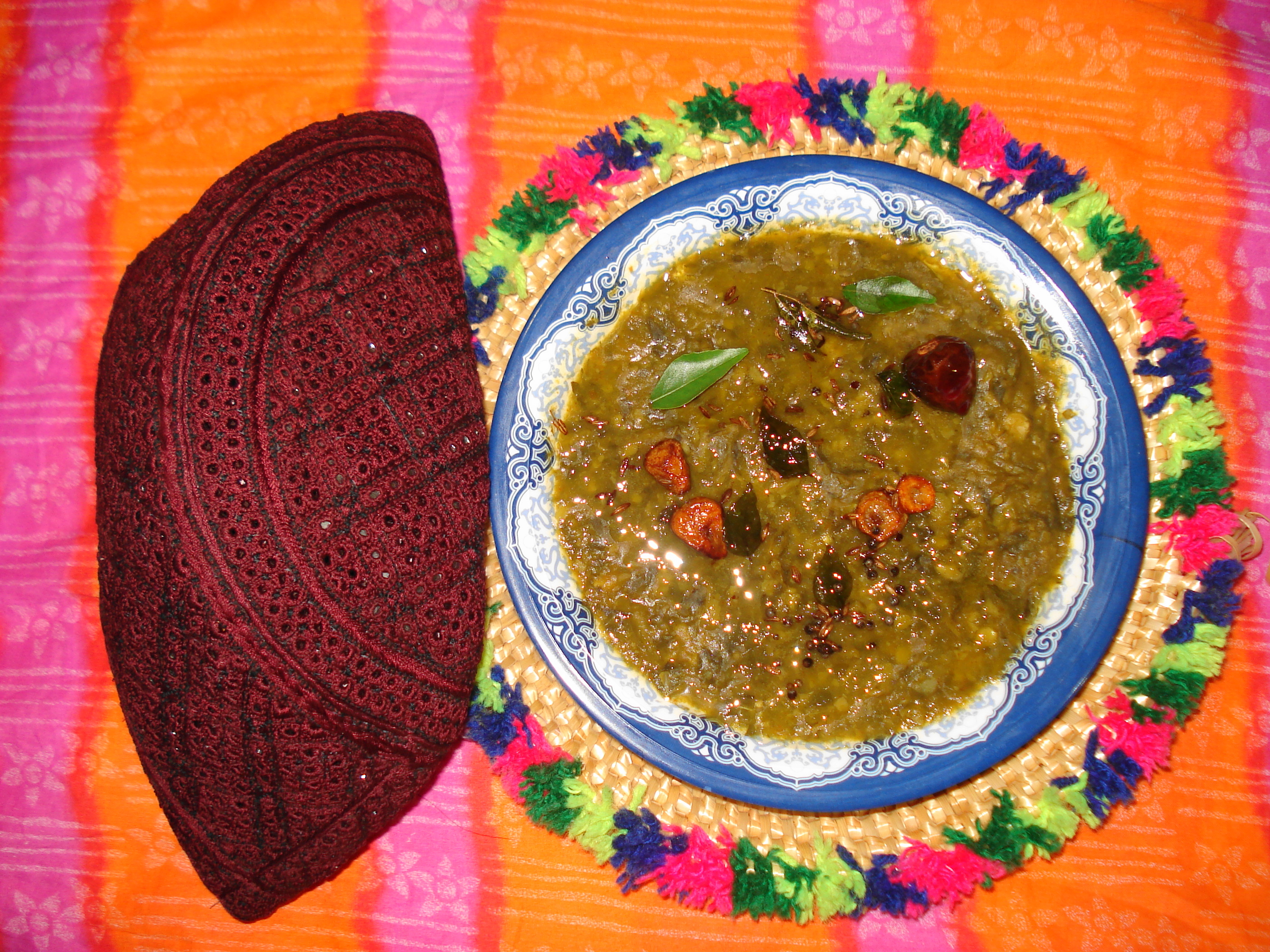
Sai bhaji is a Sindhi dish.

Sindhi cuisine refers to the native cuisine of the Sindhi people from the Sindh region, now in Pakistan. While Sindh is not geographically a part of modern India, its culinary traditions persist, due to the sizeable number of Hindu Sindhis who migrated to India following the independence of Pakistan in 1947, especially in Sindhi enclaves such as Ulhasnagar and Gandhidam.

A typical meal in many Sindhi households includes wheat-based flatbread (phulka) and rice accompanied by two dishes, one with gravy and one dry. Lotus stem (known as kamal kakri) is also used in Sindhi dishes. Cooking vegetables by deep frying is common.

Some regular Sindhi dishes are sindhi kadhi, sai bhaji, koki and besan bhaji. Ingredients frequently used are mango powder, tamarind, kokum flowers, and dried pomegranate seeds.

== Tamil Nadu ==
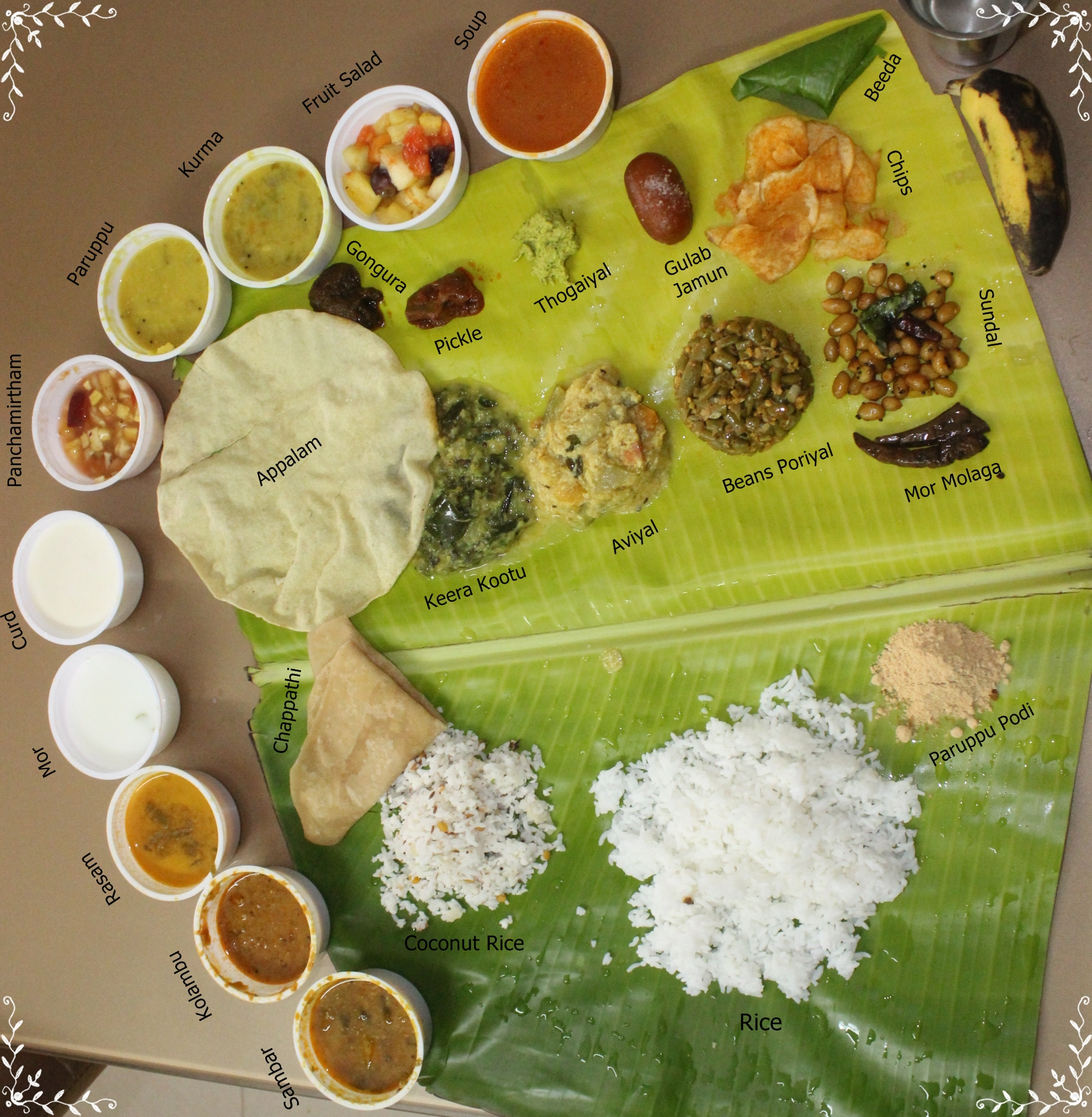
Vegetarian meals in Tamil Nadu are traditionally served on a plantain leaf.

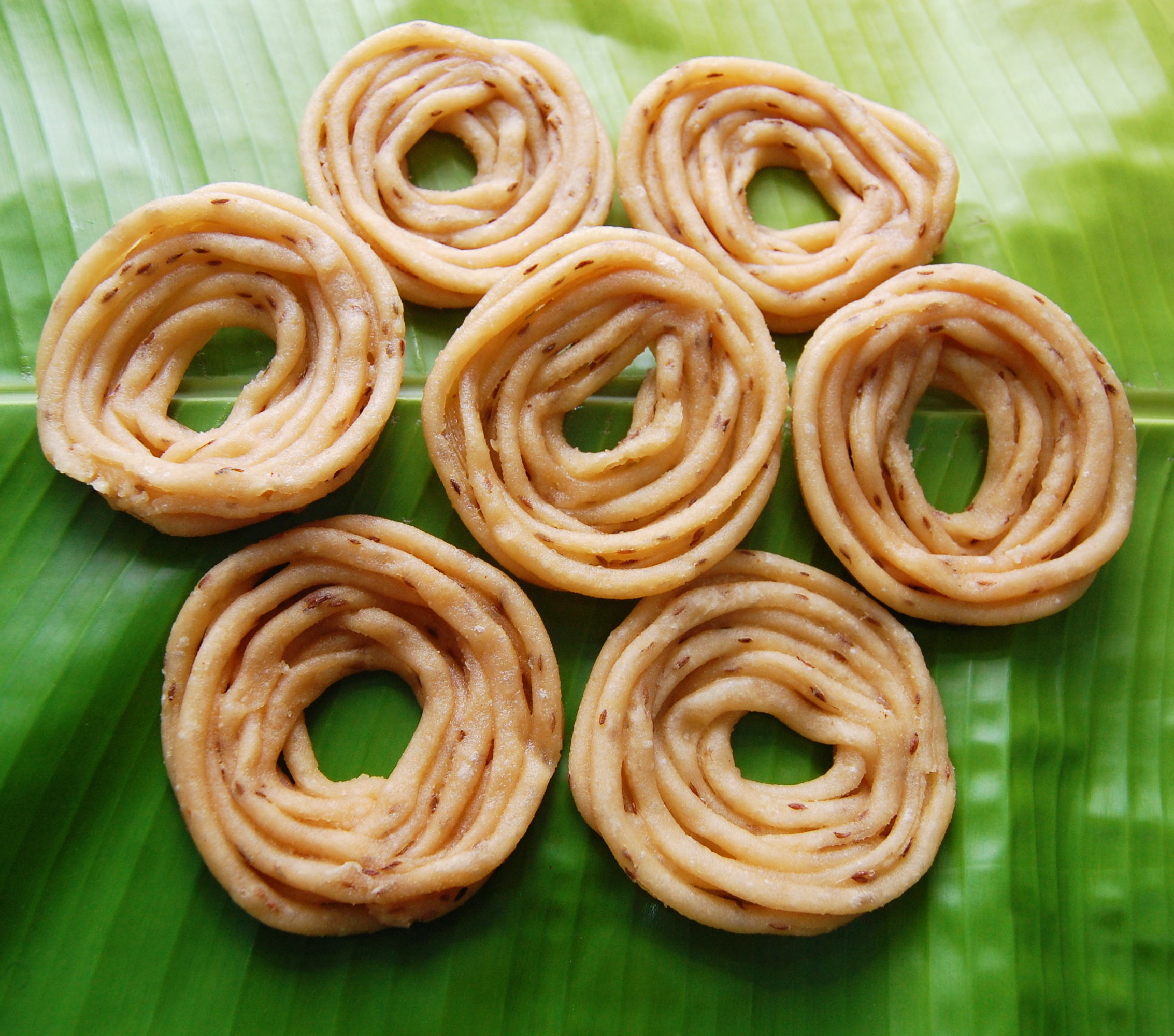
Murukku

Tamil Nadu is noted for its deep belief that serving food to others is a service to humanity, as is common in many regions of India. The region has a rich cuisine involving both traditional non-vegetarian and vegetarian dishes.

Tamil food is characterised by its use of rice, legumes, and lentils, along with distinct aromas and flavours achieved by the blending of spices such as mustard, curry leaves, tamarind, coriander, ginger, garlic, chilli pepper, cinnamon, clove, cardamom, cumin, nutmeg, coconut and rose water.

The traditional way of eating involves being seated on the floor, having the food served on a plantain leaf, and using the right hand to eat. After the meal the plantain leaf is discarded but becomes food for free-ranging cattle and goats.

A meal (called saapadu) consists of rice with other typical Tamil dishes on a plantain leaf. A typical Tamilian would eat on a plantain leaf as it is believed to give a different flavour and taste to food. Also growing in popularity are stainless-steel trays, plates with a selection of different dishes in small bowls.

Tamil food is characterised by tiffin, which is a light food taken for breakfast or dinner, and meals which are usually taken during lunch. The word "curry" is derived from the Tamil kari, meaning something similar to "sauce".

Southern regions such as Tirunelveli, Madurai, Paramakudi, Karaikudi, Chettinad and Kongu Nadu are noted for their spicy non-vegetarian dishes. Dosa, idli, pongal and biryani are some of the popular dishes that are eaten with chutney and sambar. Fish and other seafoods are also very popular, because the state is located on the coast. Chicken and goat meat are the predominantly consumed meats in Tamil Nadu.

A typical Tamil vegetarian meal is heavily dependent on rice, vegetables and lentil preparations such as rasam and sambar, but there are variations. They have influenced Kerala as well in their kootu, arachi vitta sambhar and molagootals (mulligatawny soup).

As mentioned above, the Chettinad variety of food uses many strong spices, such as pepper, garlic, fennel seeds and onions. Tamil food tends to be spicy compared to other parts of India so there is a tradition of finishing the meal with dahi (yogurt) is considered a soothing end to the meal.

Notably, Tamil Brahmin cuisine, the food of the Iyers and Iyengar community, is characterised by slightly different meal times and meal structures compared to other communities within the state.

Historically vegetarian, the cuisine is known for its milder flavour and avoidance of onion and garlic (although this practice appears to be disappearing with time).

After a light morning meal of filter coffee and different varieties of porridges (oatmeal and janata kanji are immensely popular), the main meal of the day, lunch/brunch is usually at 11 am and typically follows a two-three course meal structure. Steamed rice is the main dish, and is always accompanied by a seasonally steamed/sauteed vegetable (poriyal), and two or three types of tamarind stews, the most popular being sambhar and rasam. The meal typically ends with thair sadham (rice with yogurt), usually served with pickled mangoes or lemons.

Tiffin is the second meal of the day and features several breakfast favourites such as idli, rava idli, upma, dosa varieties, and vada, and is usually accompanied by chai.

Dinner is the simplest meal of the day, typically involving leftovers from either lunch or tiffin. Fresh seasonal fruit consumed in the state include bananas, papaya, honeydew and cantaloupe melons, jackfruit, mangos, apples, kasturi oranges, pomegranates, and nongu (hearts of palm).

== Telangana ==
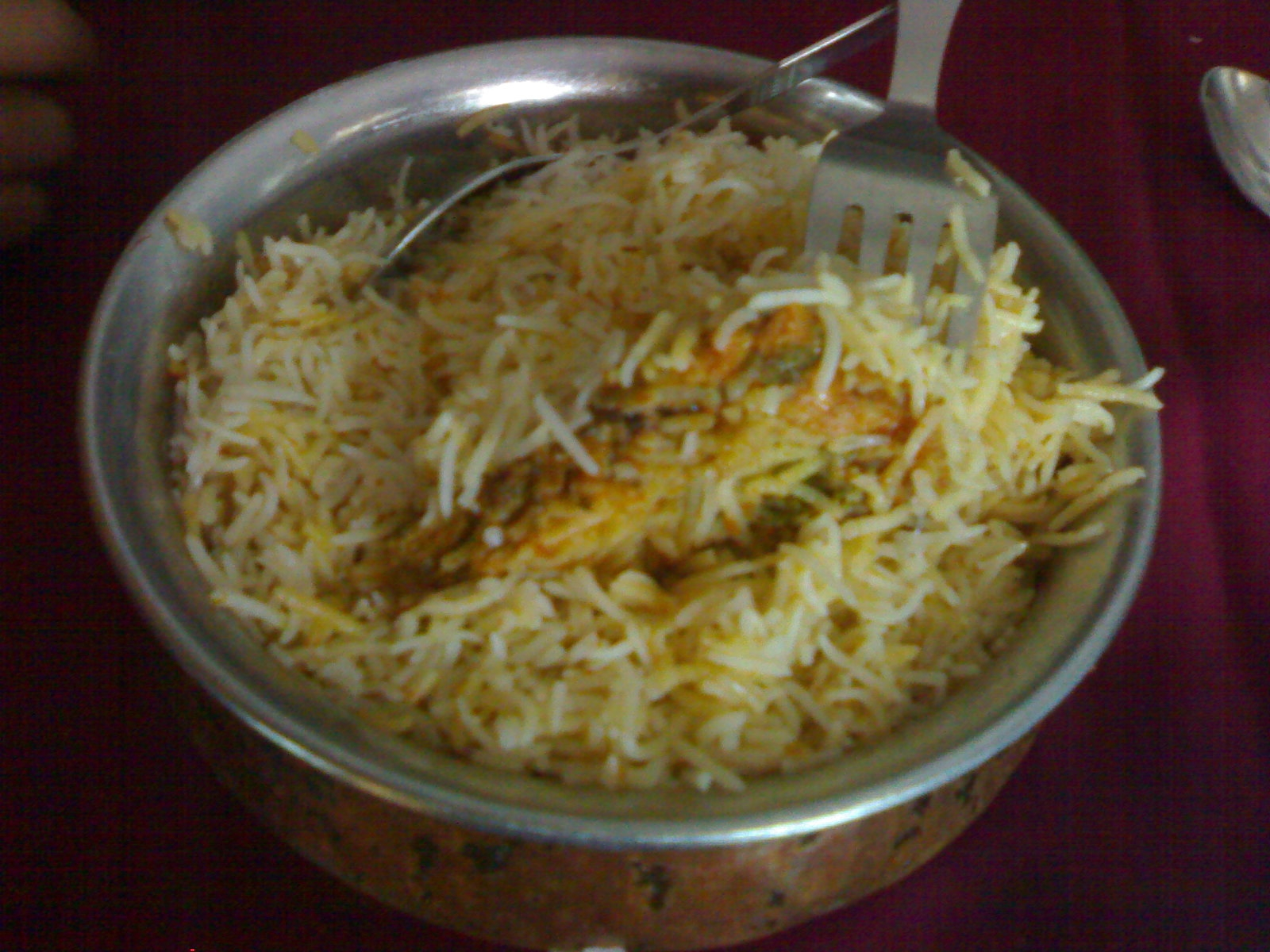
Hyderabadi biryani from Hyderabad

The cuisine of Telangana consists of the Telugu cuisine, of Telangana's Telugu people as well as Hyderabadi cuisine (also known as Nizami cuisine), of Telangana's Hyderabadi Muslim community.

Hyderabadi food is based heavily on non-vegetarian ingredients, while Telugu food is a mix of both vegetarian and non-vegetarian ingredients. Telugu food is rich in spices and chillies are abundantly used. The food also generally tends to be more on the tangy side with tamarind and lime juice both used liberally as souring agents.

Rice is the staple food of Telugu people. Starch is consumed with a variety of curries and lentil soups or broths. Vegetarian and non-vegetarian foods are both popular.

Hyderabadi cuisine includes popular delicacies such as biryani, haleem, Baghara baingan and kheema, while Hyderabadi day-to-day dishes see some similarities to Telanganite Telugu food, with its use of tamarind, rice, and lentils, along with meat. Dahi (yogurt) is a common addition to meals, as a way of tempering spiciness.

== Tripura ==
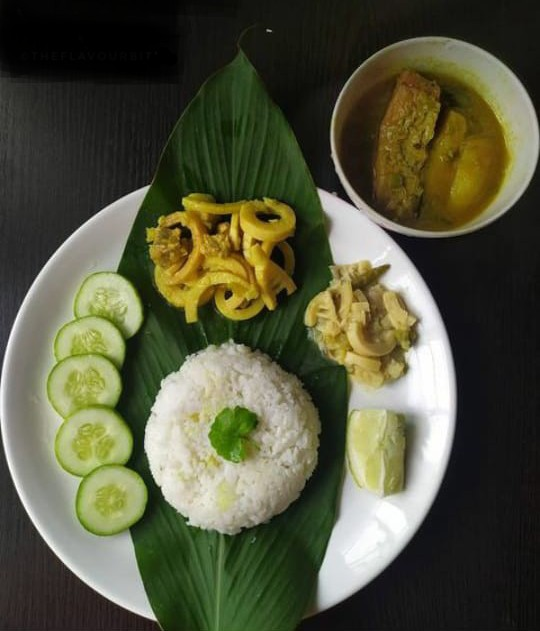
A Tripuri thali

The Tripuri people are the original inhabitants of the state of Tripura in northeast India. Today, they comprise the communities of Tipra, Reang, Jamatia, Noatia, and Uchoi, among others. The Tripuri are non-vegetarian, although they have a minority of Vaishnavite vegetarians.

The major ingredients of Tripuri cuisine include vegetables, herbs, pork, chicken, mutton, fishes, turtle, shrimps, crabs, freshwater mussels, periwinkles, edible freshwater snails and frogs.

== Uttar Pradesh ==
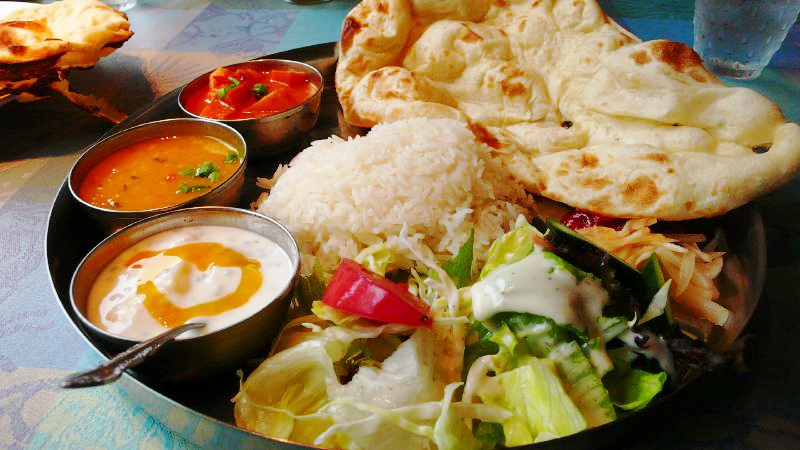
Uttar Pradeshi thali (platter) with naan, rice, daal, raita, shahi paneer, and salad

Traditionally, Uttar Pradeshi cuisine consists of Awadhi, Bhojpuri, and Mughlai cuisine, though a vast majority of the state is vegetarian, preferring dal, roti, sabzi, and rice. Pooris and kachoris are eaten on special occasions.

Chaat, samosa, and pakora, among the most popular snacks in India, originate from Uttar Pradesh.

Well-known dishes include kebabs, dum biryani, and various mutton recipes. Sheer qorma, ghevar, gulab jamun, kheer, and ras malai are some of the popular desserts in this region.

Awadhi cuisine (Hindi: अवधी खाना) is from the city of Lucknow, which is the capital of the state of Uttar Pradesh in Central-South Asia and North India, and the cooking patterns of the city are similar to those of Central Asia, the Middle East, and other parts of North India. The cuisine consists of both vegetarian and non-vegetarian dishes.

Awadh has been greatly influenced by Mughal cooking techniques, and the cuisine of Lucknow bears similarities to those of Central Asia, Kashmir, Punjab and Hyderabad. The city is also known for its Nawabi foods. The bawarchis and rakabdars of Awadh gave birth to the dum style of cooking or the art of cooking over a slow fire, which has become synonymous with Lucknow today. Their spread consisted of elaborate dishes like kebabs, kormas, biryani, kaliya, nahari-kulchas, zarda, sheermal, roomali rotis, and warqi parathas.

The richness of Awadh cuisine lies not only in the variety of cuisine but also in the ingredients used like mutton, paneer, and rich spices, including cardamom and saffron.

Mughlai cuisine is a style of cooking developed in the Indian subcontinent by the imperial kitchens of the Mughal Empire. It represents the cooking styles used in North India (especially Uttar Pradesh).

The cuisine is strongly influenced by Central Asian cuisine, the region where the Chagatai-Turkic Mughal rulers originally hailed from, and has strongly influenced the regional cuisines of Kashmir and the Punjab region.

The tastes of Mughlai cuisine vary from extremely mild to spicy, and is often associated with a distinctive aroma and the taste of ground and whole spices.

A Mughlai course is an elaborate buffet of main course dishes with a variety of accompaniments.

== Uttarakhand ==
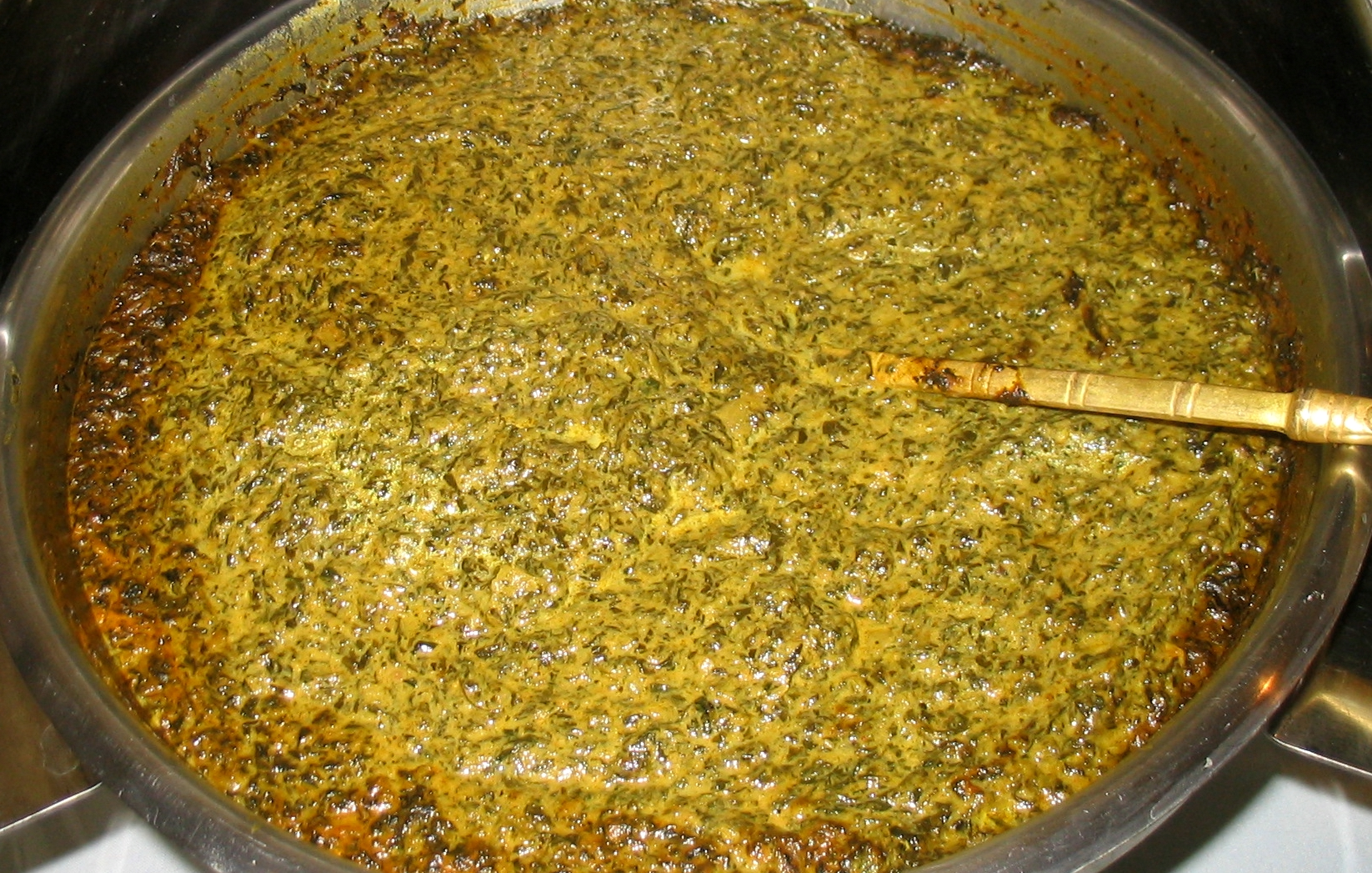
Saag, a popular Kumauni dish from Uttarakhand, made from green vegetables such as spinach and fenugreek

Food from Uttrakhand is known to be healthy and wholesome to suit the high-energy necessities of the cold, mountainous region. It is a high-protein diet that makes heavy use of pulses and vegetables. Traditionally, it is cooked over wood or charcoal fire mostly using iron utensils.

While making use of condiments such as jeera, haldi and rai common in other Indian cuisines, Uttarakhand cuisine also use exotic ingredients such as jambu, timmer, ghandhraini and bhangira.

Although the people in Uttarakhand also make dishes common in other parts of northern India, several preparations are unique to Uttarakhand such as rus, chudkani, dubuk, chadanji, jholi, kapa, and more.

Among dressed salads and sauces, kheere ka raita, nimbu mooli ka raita, daarim ki khatai and aam ka fajitha are also popular.

The cuisine mainly consists of food from two different sub-regions, Garhwal and Kumaon, though their basic ingredients are the same. Both Kumaoni and Garhwali styles make liberal use of ghee, lentils or pulses, vegetables and bhaat (rice). They also use badi (sun-dried urad dal balls) and mungodi (sun-dried moong dal balls) as substitutes for vegetables at times.

During festivals and other celebrations, the people of Uttarakhand prepare special refreshments which include both salty preparations such as bada and sweet preparations such as pua and singal. Uttarakhand also has several sweets (mithai) such as singodi, bal-mithai, and malai laddu, native to its traditions.
