= Farsan (food) =

Salty snacks of the Indian subcontinent

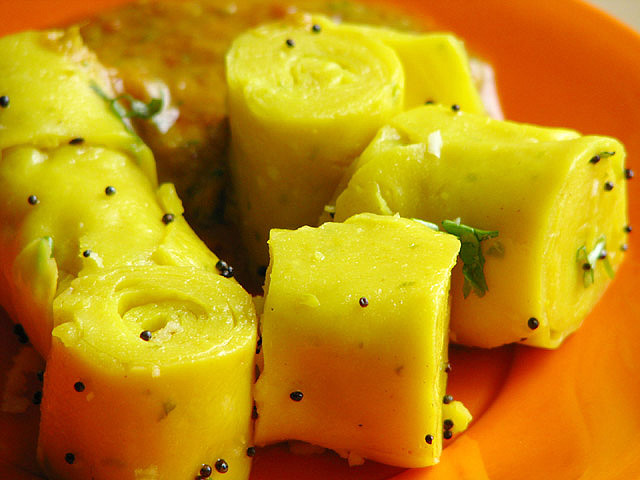
- Khandvi, a popular Gujarati snack (Farsan)
- Course: Snack
- Place of origin: Indian subcontinent
- Region or state: Gujarat, Maharashtra, Sindh
- Main ingredients: Gram flour

Farsan or Pharsāṇ (Gujarati: ફરસાણ, Hindi and Marathi: फरसाण) are salty snacks that originated in the Indian subcontinent. Farsans are consumed in Marwari cuisine, Gujarati cuisine, Marathi cuisine and Sindhi cuisine, wherein a wide variety are prepared on special occasions and to entertain guests, and are also consumed with tea. Farsan is also found throughout the rest of India, particularly Maharashtra due to the influx of Gujarati and Rajasthani traders and migration of Sindhis in Mumbai.

Some are fried items which are then dried and can be stored; others are fresh or steamed.

The main varieties are:

- Dhokla
- Fafda
- Khaman
- Chevdo (Bombay Mix)
- Chakri
- Bhajiya
- Khandvi
- Medu Vada
- Patras, Patarveliya
- Gathiya
- Mathri
- Muthia
- Vanva
- Handvo
- Aloo Sev
- Besan Sev
- Dhebra
- Gota
- Bakarwadi
- Masala Puri
- Bhujiya
