= Handvo =

Vegetable cake snack from Gujarat, India

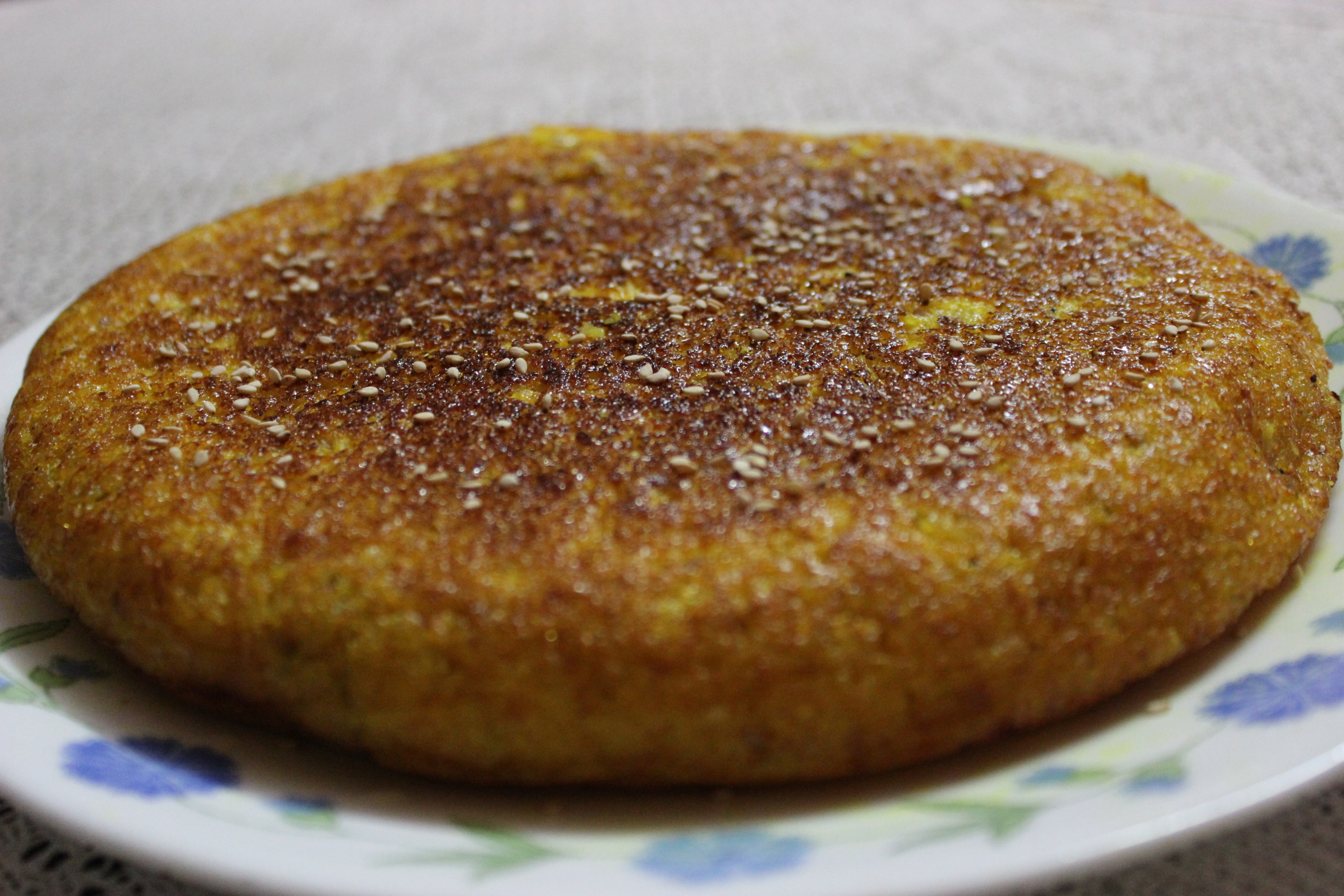
- Handvo
- Alternative names: Haandvo
- Course: Main course
- Place of origin: Gujarat
- Associated cuisine: Indian
- Serving temperature: Room temperature
- Main ingredients: Wheat flour, sesame, bottle gourd, lentils
- Variations: Mixed daal Handvo

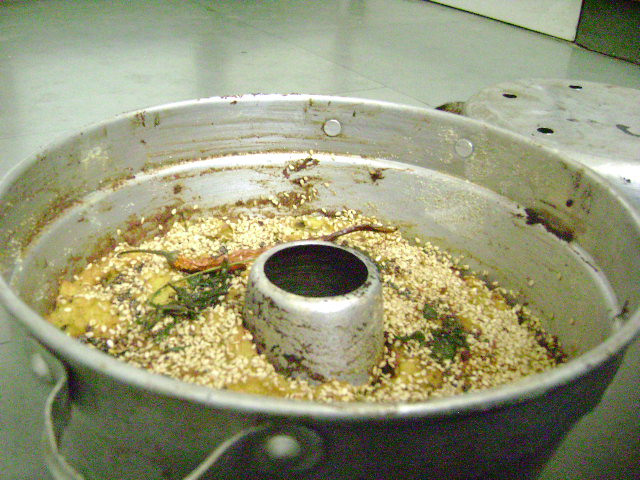
Handvo being prepared in special cooker

Handvo or haandvo (Gujarati: હાંડવો) is a savory vegetable cake originating from Gujarat, India. It is a part of the Gujarati cuisine. It is often made with a bottle gourd filling, though many other vegetables can be added. Sometimes crushed peanuts are also added.

== Preparation ==
Handvo batter is made by mixing rice and various lentils, which are rinsed, dried, and then ground. The pulses are mixed with yogurt to prepare a fermented batter. The batter is mixed with yogurt and spices and is then steamed.

== Variations ==
Handvo can be made with moong dal (split yellow gram) or chola dal (split cow peas) instead of rice. Vegetable handvo is a variety based on gram flour and contains vegetables like peas and cabbage, and also includes garam masala. It is often eaten along with pickle or tea.

== See also ==
- Gujarati cuisine
- Dhokla
- Khaman
- Muthia
- Dhebra
- Thepla
