= Gujarati cuisine =

Cuisine of Gujarat, India

Gujarati cuisine is the cuisine of the Indian state of Gujarat. The typical Gujarati thali consists of rotli, dal or curry, rice, and shaak (a dish made up of several different combinations of vegetables and spices, which may be either spicy or sweet). The thali will also include preparations made from pulses or whole beans (called kathor in Gujarati) such as moong or black-eyed beans, a snack item (farsaan) like dhokla, pathra, samosa, or fafda, and a sweet (mishthaan) like mohanthal, jalebi, or sevaiya.

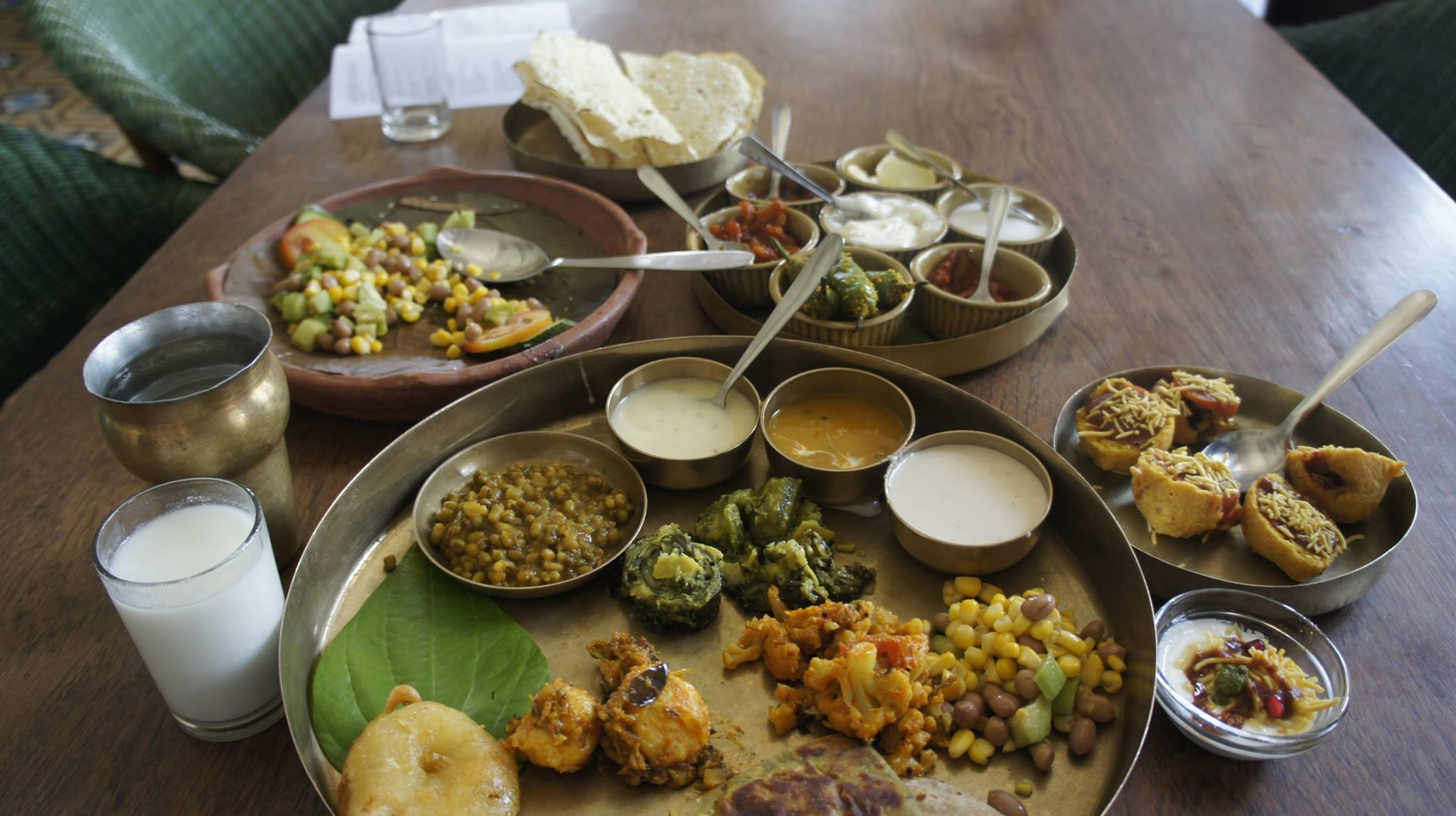

Gujarati cuisine varies widely in flavour and heat, depending on a family's tastes as well as the region of Gujarat to which they belong. North Gujarat, Kathiawad, Kachchh, Central Gujarat and South Gujarat are the five major regions of Gujarat that contribute their unique touch to Gujarati cuisine. Many Gujarati dishes are distinctively sweet, salty, and spicy commonly.

Despite easy access to plentiful seafood due to a long coastline, Gujarat is primarily a vegetarian state. Many communities such as Koli Patel, Ghanchi, Muslim communities and Parsis, however, do include seafood, chicken and mutton in their diet.

== Staple foods ==
Staples include homemade khichdi (rice and lentils or rice and mung beans), chaas (buttermilk), and pickles as side. Main dishes are based on steam cooked vegetables with different spices and dals that are added to a vaghar, which is a mixture of spices heated in oil that varies depending on the main ingredients. Salt, sugar, lemon, lime, and tomatoes are used frequently to prevent dehydration in an area where temperatures reach 50 °C (122 °F) in the shade. It is common to add a little sugar or jaggery to some of the vegetable dishes and dal, which adds sweetness to the often savory and spicy dishes.

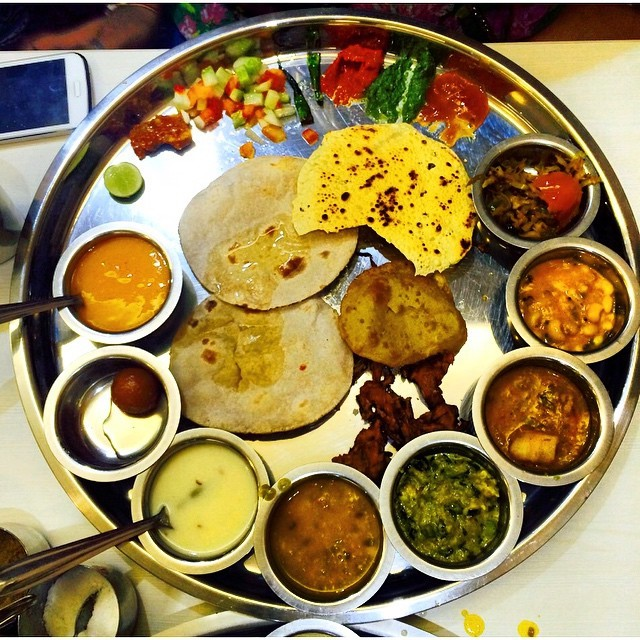
Gujarati Thali, a variety filled traditional dish served in Gujarat

The cuisine changes with the seasonal availability of vegetables. In summer, when mangoes are ripe and widely available in the market, for example, Keri no Ras (fresh mango pulp) is often an integral part of the meal. The spices used also change depending on the season. Garam masala and its constituent spices are used less in summer. Regular fasting, with diets limited to milk, dried fruits, and nuts, is commonplace.

Gujaratis are predominantly vegetarians, even though pockets of the state consume chicken, eggs and fish.

Flat bread prepared with Bajra has nutritional value similar to other foods based on flours. Common meals in villages near Saurashtra during the cold winters consists of thick rotis, called "rotla" made of bajra flour (pearl millet flour) and "bhakri" made of wheat flour, garlic chutney, onion, and chaas.

Sweets (desserts) served as part of a thali are typically made from milk, sugar, and nuts. "Dry" sweets such as magas and ghooghra are typically made around celebrations, such as weddings, or at Diwali.

Gujarati cuisine is also distinctive in its wide variety of farsan — side dishes that complement the main meal and are served alongside it. Some farsan are eaten as snacks or light meals by themselves.

Gujaratis will often refer to dal-bhat-rotli-saak as their everyday meal. For special occasions, this basic quartet is supplemented with additional shaak, sweet dishes, and farsan. A festive Gujarati thali often contain over a dozen items. Dietary rules restrict the permissible combination of dishes. For example, if kadhi is to be served, then a lentil preparation such as chutti dal, vaal, or mug ni dal will also be included. The sweet dish accompanying kadhi will likely be milk or yogurt–based, like doodhpak or shrikhand. However, a yogurt-based raita would not be served with such a meal. Festive meals based on dal will typically have a wheat-based sweet dish like lapsi or ladoo as the sweet accompaniment. Many Gujarati families make and consume moong dal in their diet on Wednesdays. There are established combinations of spices that some believe to facilitate digestion, that are eaten with different foods.

Gujarati thali is sometimes seen as being "no-frills" even though it can be elaborate. India's current prime minister, Narendra Modi has often arranged Gujarati food for his special overseas guests like Shinzo Abe or Portuguese Prime Minister António Costa. Modi himself has been said to prefer Khichdi, even when visiting overseas, something that opposing politicians sometimes mocked. Urmila Asher, popularly known as "Gujju Ben", became known for her home-style Gujarati cuisine.

== Sub-regional cuisines ==
=== Coastal Gujarat ===
In coastal Gujarat, the Kharwa community has developed a cuisine consisting of fresh and dried fish. Common seafood are pomfrets, khandwas, gedadas, surmai, prawns, crabs, lobster, and narsinga (calamari).

=== Khathiawar ===
Gujarati cuisine varies in flavour and other aspects from region to region. One can notice that food from Surat, Kutch, Kathiawad and North Gujarat are the most distinct ones. Tastes also differ according to family preferences. Most popular Gujarati dishes have a sweet taste, as traditionally, sugar or jaggery is added to most Gujarati food items, like vegetables and dal. Additionally, Gujarati food is cooked in unique ways, with some dishes being stir-fried while others are steam cooked, with vegetables and spices or dal being boiled and later vaghar/chaunk (fried spices) being added to it to enhance the flavour.

== List of Gujarati vegetarian dishes ==
=== Breads ===
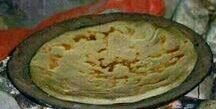
Bajri no rotlo

- Rotla (બાજરીનો રોટલો): Thick millet flour flatbread usually grilled over coals in clay pan.
- Makai no rotlo: Thick maize flour flatbread usually grilled over coals in clay pan.
- Bhakri: Made with whole wheat flour, thicker than rotli.
- Phulka rotli (also called rotli or chapati): Made with whole wheat flour, rolled thin.
- Juvar no rotlo: Thick sorghum flatbread.
- Parotha: Shallow-fried whole wheat flatbread.
- Puri: Made with whole wheat flour, deep-fried.
- Thepla or dhebra (થેપલા/ઢેબરા): Made with a mixture of flours, pan-fried, mildly spiced, usually contains shredded vegetables.
- Poodla (sweet): Made with a mixture of flours, pan-fried.
- Rajgira ni puri

=== Rice ===
In addition to plain rice, Gujarati cuisine also includes rice based dishes such as:

- Biranji: Steamed rice flavoured with saffron, sugar, and dried fruit.
- Khatta-mittha bhaat (sour and sweet rice): Rice, boiled with potatoes and spices, yellow in colour and accompanied with lemon peel.
- Vagharelo bhaat: Aromatic tempered rice using various spices.
- Doodhpak: Rice pudding made by boiling rice with milk and sugar, and flavoured with cardamom, raisins, saffron, cashews, pistachios, or almonds. It is typically served as a dessert.
- Khichdi (rice & a dal): Cooked like porridge accompanied with ghee, dahi (yogurt), and pickle
- Pulao (rice with vegetables)
- Khichu: Kneaded rice flour made by heating it with water, salt, green chillies, and cumin.
- Sabudana Khichadi
- Fada ni khichdi
- kachori: Deep fried, crispy and round shape soft small chapati type which often made with rice flour and all purpose flour.Mostly it is filled with some delicious materials.

=== Vegetables (Shaak) ===
- Bateta nu shaak (potato curry)
- Bateta sukhi bhaji (dry potato)
- Bateta Dungri nu shaak (Potato and onion curry)
- Bateta Ringan nu shaak (Potato and Eggplant Curry)
- Bateta Guvar nu shaak (Potato and Cluster beans curry)
- Bateta Chawli nu Shaak (Potato and glossary long beans)
- Lasaniya Bateta (Garlic flavored Potato curry)
- Bharela Ringan (stuffed dry Eggplant)
- Bharela bhinda (stuffed dry okra)
- Bharela karela (stuffed dry karelu)
- Bhinda nu shaak (dry okra)
- Bhinda Bateta nu shaak (dry Okra & potato)
- Vatana bateta nu shaak (potato and peas curry)
- Cholaa nu shaak (black eyed peas curry)
- Chawli Ringan Bateta nu Shaak (glossary long beans, brinjal and potato curry)
- Dhana capsicum nu shaak (dry coriander, capsicum and chickpea flour curry)
- Dudhi bateta nu shaak (bottle gourd and potato curry)
- Ringan bateta nu shaak (eggplant and potato curry)
- Dudhi chana ni daal nu shaak (bottle gourd and split black chickpea curry)
- Dudhi ganthia nu shaak (bottle gourd)
- Dudhi mag ni dal nu shaak (bottle gourd and mung bean Curry)
- Dudhi nu shaak (bottle gourd curry)
- Fansi ma dhokli nu shaak (French bean curry with Dumplings)
- Fansi nu shaak (dry green bean curry)
- Ganthia nu shaak
- Gathoda nu shaak
- Guvar nu shaak (cluster beans curry)

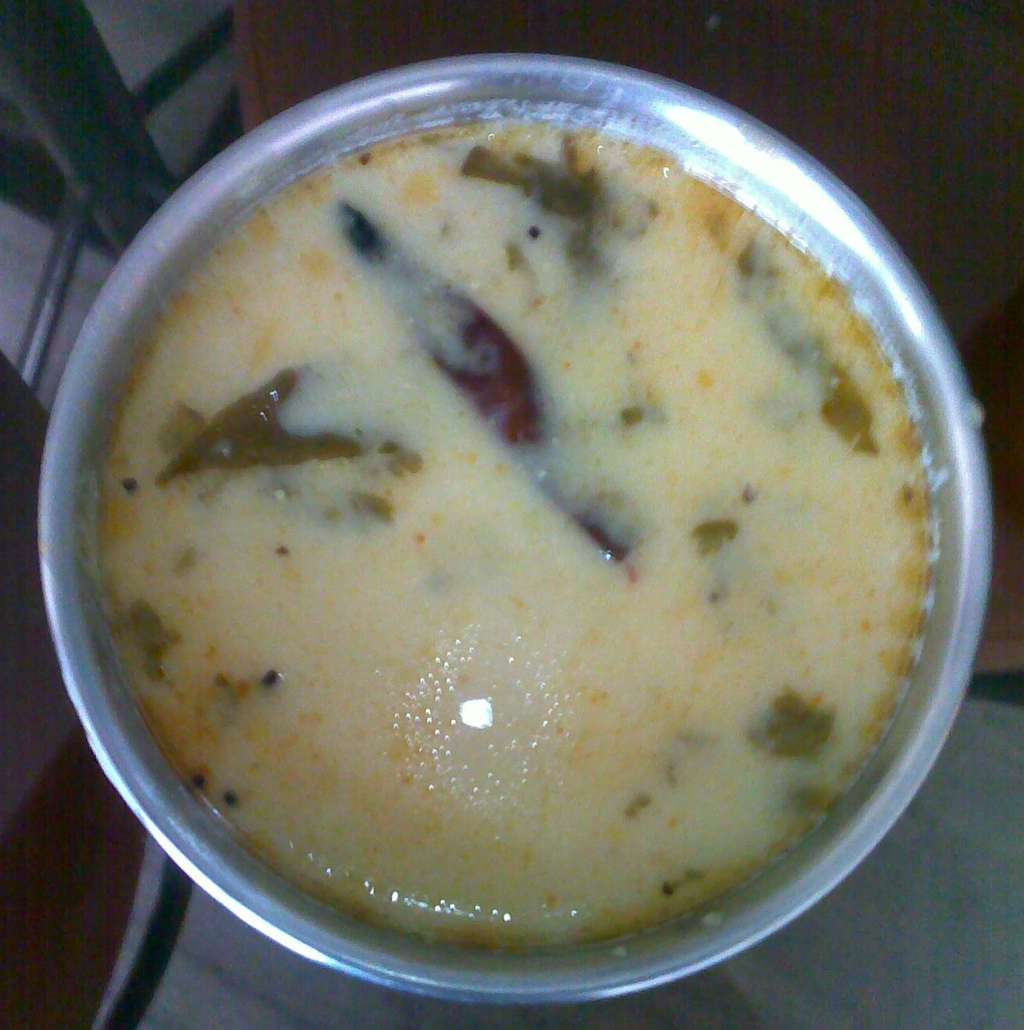
Gujarati Kadhi

- Kadhi (curry made from buttermilk chhash and gram flour, usually either sweet or tangy)
- Karela nu shaak (bitter gourd curry)
- Kobi bateta nu shaak (cabbage and potato curry)
- Keri nu shaak (Mango curry)
- Kobi Papdi nu shaak (Cabbage and broad beans curry)
- Mag nu shaak (mung bean curry)
- Methi nu shaak (fenugreek leaves curry)
- Methi bateta nu shaak (fenugreek leaves and potato curry)
- Panchkutiyu shaak (five-vegetable curry consisting of ridge gourd, potato, bottle gourd, eggplant, and green peas)
- Parwal bateta nu shaak (pointed gourd and potato curry)
- Ringan nu shaak (eggplant curry)
- Ringan no oro (roasted eggplant mashed curry)
- Sev tameta nu shaak (curry made of tomatoes and sev)
- Sambhariyu Shaak (Stuffed Ivy gourd, baby potatoes, sweet potatoes and eggplant curry)
- Tameta bateta nu shaak (tomato and potato curry)
- Tindoda nu shaak (ivy gourd curry)
- Tindoda batetanu shaak (ivy gourd curry)
- Tameta muthiyanu shaak
- Palak nu shaak (spinach leaves curry )
- Undhiyu: A mixed vegetable casserole that is traditionally cooked upside down underground in earthen pots fired from above. This dish is usually made of the vegetables that are available on the South Gujarat coastline during the winter season, including (amongst others) green beans, unripe banana, muthia, and purple yam. These are cooked in a spicy curry that sometimes includes coconut. Surti Undhiyu is a variant that is served with puri at weddings and banquets. Again it is a mixed vegetable casserole, made with red lentils and seasoned with spices, grated coconut, and palm sugar in a mild sauce. It is garnished with chopped peanuts and toasted grated coconut, and served with rice or roti. This dish is very popular all over Gujarat, and most Gujarati families eat it at least once a year on Makar Sankranti.
- Umbadiyu: a seasonal(winter) delicacy from South Gujarat (especially from Valsad District), made with Green beans, purple yam, potatoes(stuffed chutney of green chilly, green coriander chutney and peanut), egg plant(stuffed) and sweet potato and local plants herbs for fragrance and earthiness all the ingredients are put in earthen pot upside down in fire
- Val papadi nu shaak (Flat bean curry)
- Dal dhokli

=== Side dishes (Farsan) ===
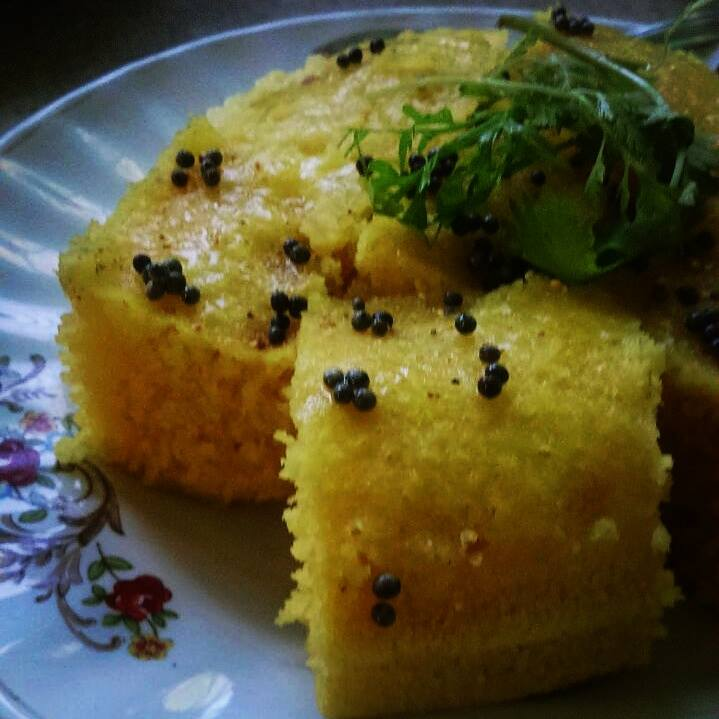
Khaman

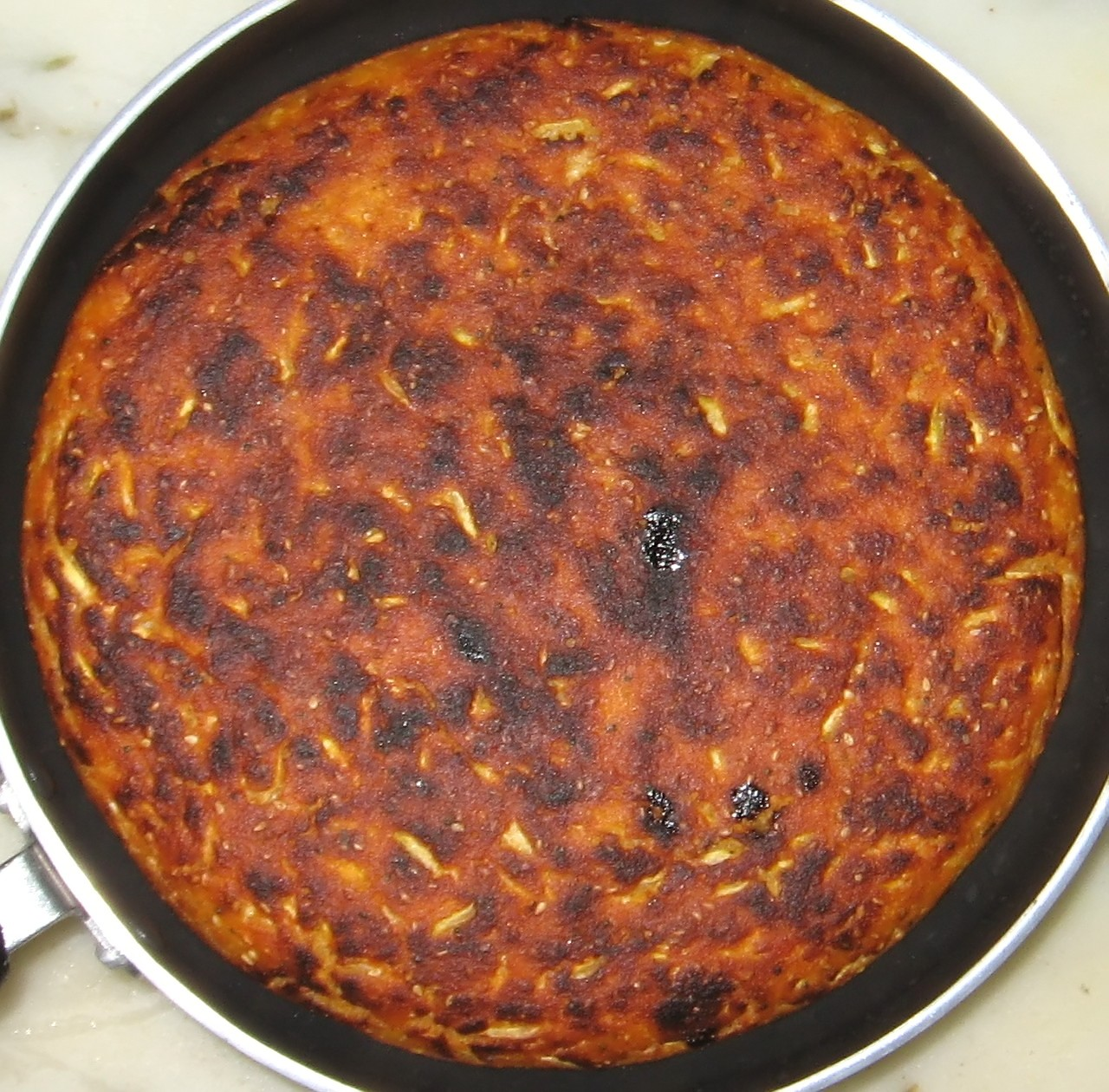
Handvo

Farsan are side dishes in Gujarati cuisine.

- Dabeli (a bread stuffed with the spicy masala mixture)
- Bhajiya (deep fried savoury snacks; a popular variety is pakora)
- Dal Vada (deep fried savoury snacks; a popular variety is Dal Pakoda) Dal vada, Vaati dal na bhajiya
- Locho (a Surati variety made from chickpea flour)
- Aloo puri (another Surati variety)
- Chaat (A mixture of potato pieces, crispy fried bread, and spices topped with chutney, cilantro, and yogurt)
- Dahi vada (Fried dumplings soaked in yogurt and topped with salt, cumin, and cayenne pepper)
- Dhokla (steamed cake made primarily of rice flour)
- Handvo (steamed cake made of rice flour, beans, yogurts, and calabash)
- Kachori (a deep fried dumpling made of flour and filled with a stuffing of yellow moong dal, black pepper, cayenne pepper, and ginger)
- Khaman (Steamed cakes made out of gram flour, garnished with green chili pepper and cilantro; types include nylon khaman and vati dal na khaman
- Khandvi (roll made of gram flour and dahi (yogurt) topped with mustard seed, cilantro, and grated coconut)
- Upma
- Khichu (a thick porridge-like mixture made of rice flour and seasoned with cumin seeds; once prepared, the mixture is often topped with oil, cayenne pepper, and salt)
- Lilva kachori (a variety of kachori made with pigeon peas)
- Patra (Patarveliya)
- Methi na gota (Fried fenugreek Dumplings)
- Muthia (steamed dumpling made of gram flour, fenugreek, salt, turmeric, and cayenne pepper; the steamed dumpling can also be stir fried with mustard seed)
- Pani puri (a round hollow flatbread that is fried crisp and filled with potato, and black chickpeas and topped with water seasoned with mint and green chili pepper, and tamarind chutney)
- Sev khamani (grated khaman topped with crispy, fried sev)
- Vegetable handva (served hot either with chutney or tomato sauce or pickle)
- Methi na vada (vada made with Bajara flour and green fenugreek leaves)
- samosa
- Surati samosa or Navtad Samosa
- sabudana na vada
- Khichdo
- Batata vada
- Kela vada (fried banana dumplings)
- Ratadu na vada (yam fritters)
- Bafela (steamed) muthiya (of any vegetable)
- Tadela Bhaat na muthiya (fried rice fritters)
- Ponk na vada
- Khaja
- Undhiyu
- Sev Usal

=== Snacks (Nasta) ===
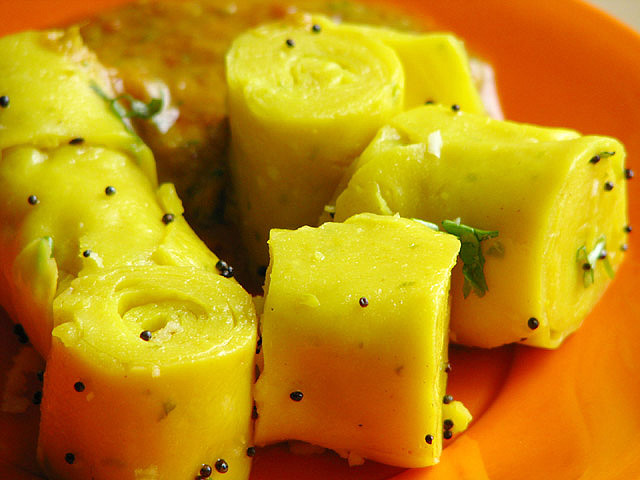
Khandvi (known as "Patudi" in South Gujarat), a popular Gujarati snack

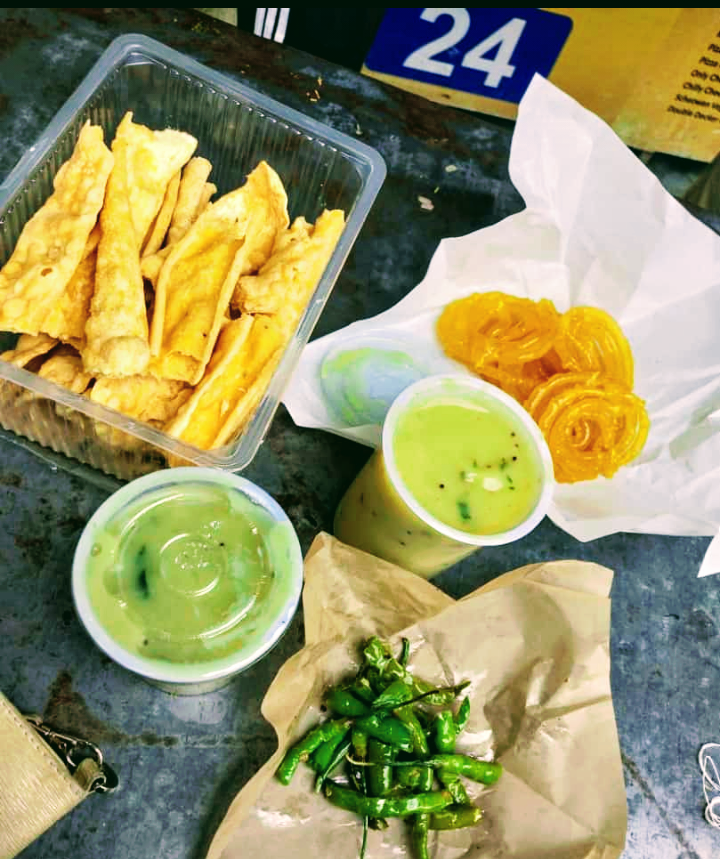
Fafda Jalebi

- Chavanu (mixed fried snacks)
- Chakri
- Chorafali
- Fafda
- Ganthiya
- Khakhra
- Mathia
- Sev (palak Sev, Aloo sev)
- Sev mamra
- Lasaniya mamra
- Makai no dana (corn chevda)
- Porbandar khajli
- Khandvi (Patudi)
- Methi sakarpara
- Methi Muthia
- Ragda Pettis
- Nachni Methi Muthias
- Tuver lilva kachori
- Khichu Papdi
- Khaman
- Mathiya
- Suvari or sweet puri
- Thapda
- Sarevada/chokhaliya (rice flour papad)
- Fulwadi
- Fried Suran (Yam)

=== Dal (pulses) ===
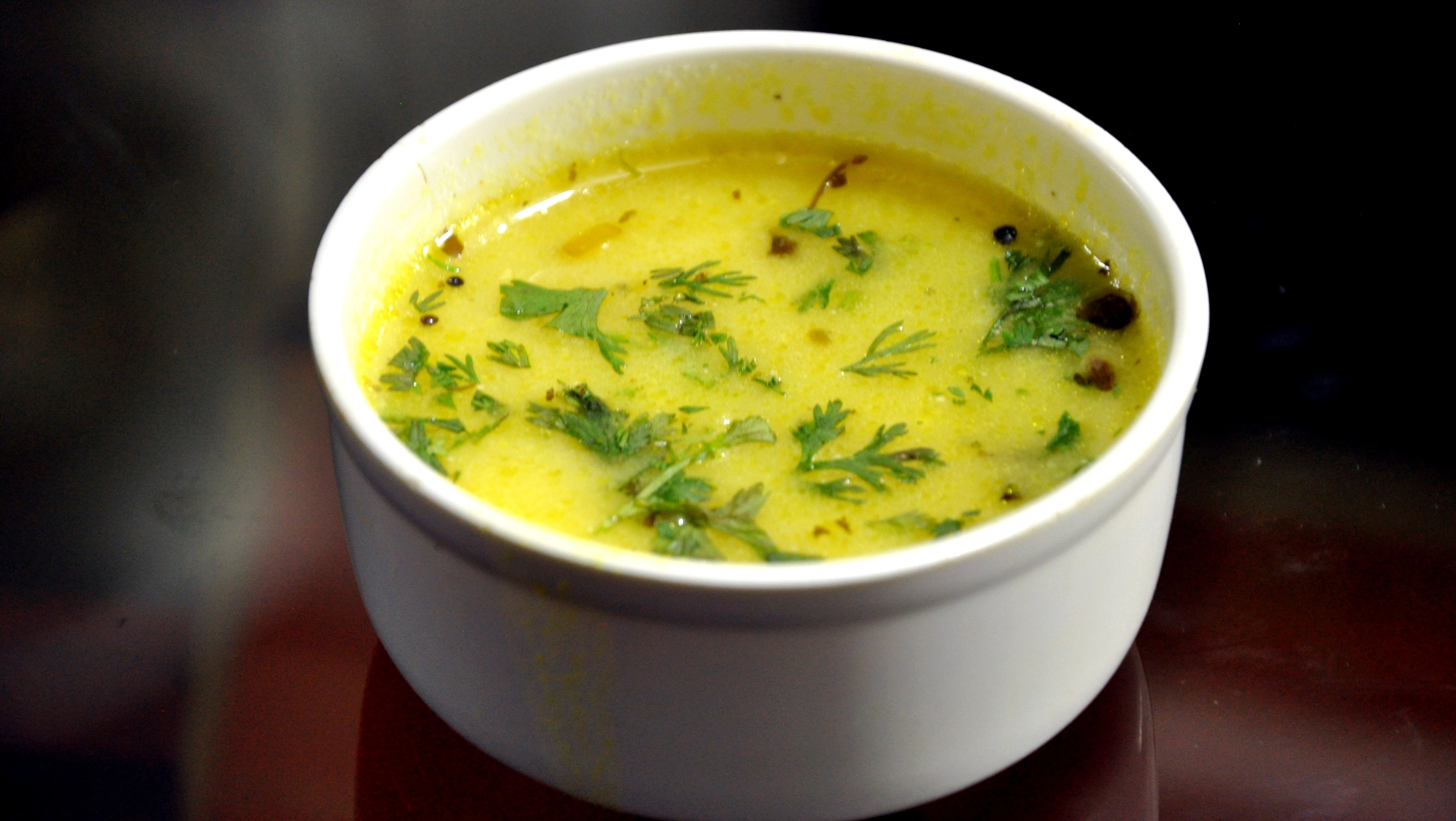
Kadhi

- Gujarati Daal
- Moong Dal
- Gujarati kadhi
- Kadh (an intermediate between kadhi and daal)
- Mix dal
- Adad ni daal (Great with bajara rotala)

=== Mithai (sweets) ===
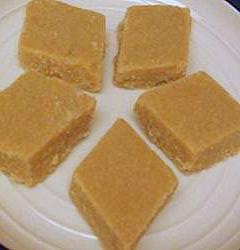
Sukhadi

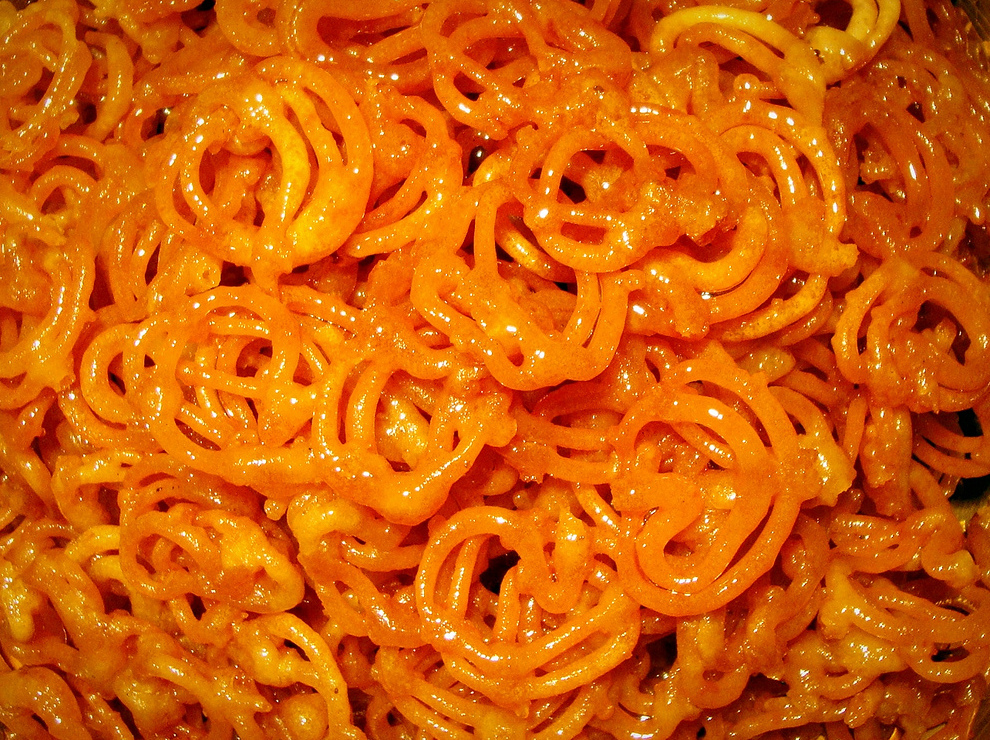
Jalebi

- Adadiya
- Jadariyu
- Sutarfeni
- Kansar
- Maisur
- Halvasan
- Aadupak
- Malpua
- Keri no ras
- Basundi
- Ghari
- Ghughra
- Ghebar or Ghevar
- Son Papdi
- Magas (or Magaj)
- Sukhadi
- Mohanthar/Mohanthal (gram flour fudge)
- ghaum ni sev (wheat flour sev)
- Ronvelia
- Penda
- Barfi
- Ladu
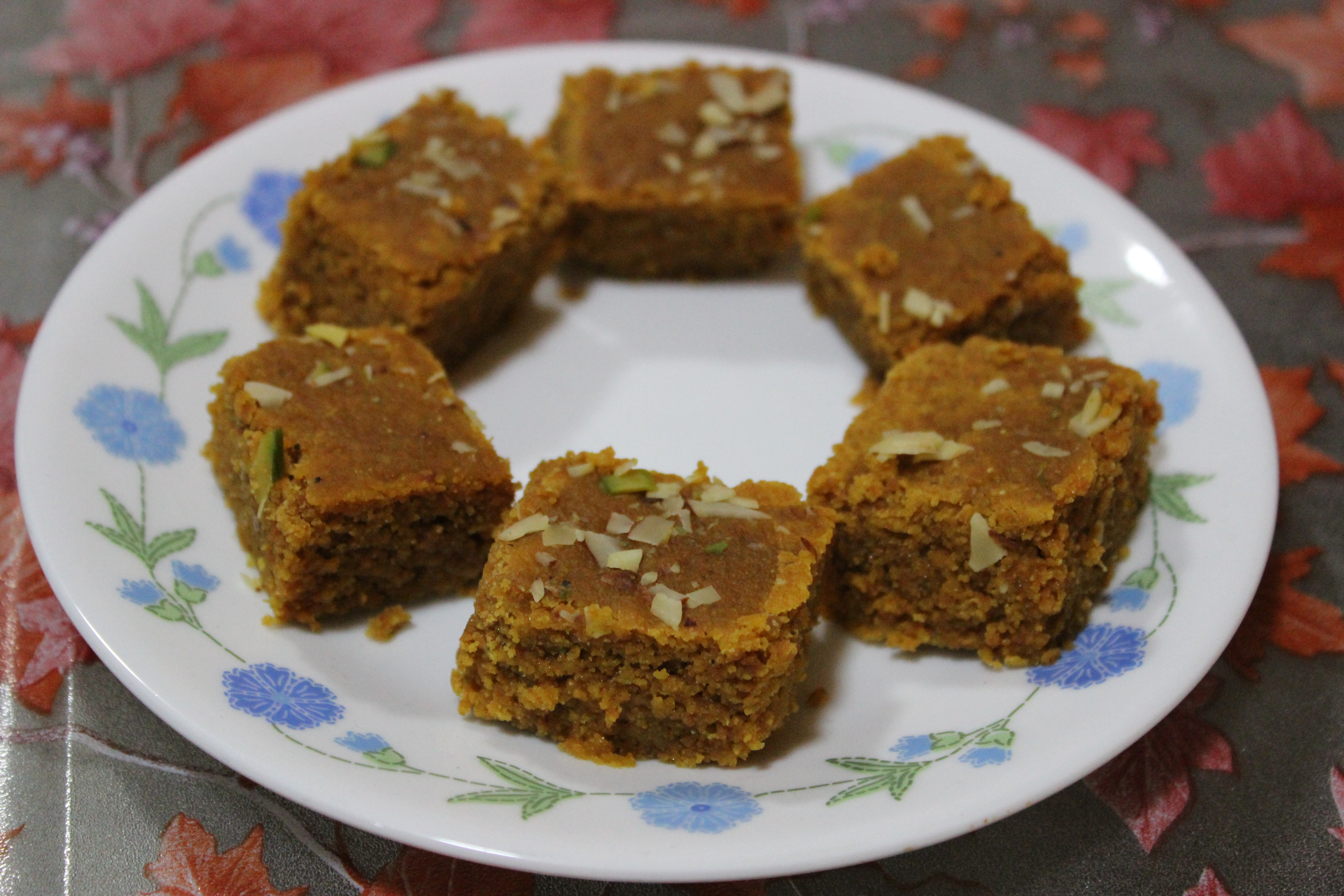
  Mohanthal Famous Gujarati Sweet
- Sheero (sweet from semolina or wheat flour or rajegro)
- Ghooghra
- Jalebi
- Shrikhand
- Sweet Sev
- Lapsi
- Doodhpak
- Shakkarpara
- Kopra paak
- Dudhi no halwo
- Kaju katri
- Gulab jambu
- Velan lapsi
- Beet no halwo
- Moong dal Halwa
- Fada ni lapsi
- Nankhatai
- Kulfi

=== Condiments ===
- Chutney
- Raita
- Athanu
- Papadi
- Masala Papad
- Kachumber
- Chhundo
- Methia Mango Pickle
- Murbbo

=== Spices and seasonings ===
- Kokum
- Aambli or Aamli (Tamarind)
- Gor (Jaggery)
- Chaat Masala
- Hardar or Havej (Turmeric powder)
- Kothmir (Coriander Leaves)
- Elaichi (Cardamom)
- Garam Masala (Mix of dry spices, roasted and powdered)
- Hing (Asafoetida)
- Rai - Mustard seed
- Jeeru (Cumin)
- Shahi jeeru (Caraway seeds)
- Kesar (Saffron)
- Lilu marchu (Green chilli)
- Lal marchu (Cayenne pepper)
- Methi (Fenugreek - leaves and seeds)
- Phoodino or pudina (Mentha Mint)
- Soonth (ginger powder)
- Laving (cloves)
- Mitho limbdo (curry leaves)
- Dhana (Coriander seeds)
- Singadana (Ground Nuts)
- Badiya - Star Anise
- Taj - Cinnamon
- Jaiphal - Nutmeg
- Variyali - fennel seeds
- Tamal patra - Bay leaf
- Kara marri - Black peppercorns
- Tamal Patra - Bay leaf
- Sanchal - Black salt
- Ajamo - Carom seed
- Limbu na phool (Saji na phool) - Citric acid
- Sava - Dill Seeds
- Amchur - Dried mango powder
- Varakh - Edible leaf (Gold or silver)
- Madh - Honey
- Javintri - Mace
- Sendhalu mithu - Rock salt

=== Drinks ===
- Jaggery Water
- Nimbupani (Lemon water)
- Chhas (Buttermilk)
