= Undhiyu =

Gujarati vegetable dish

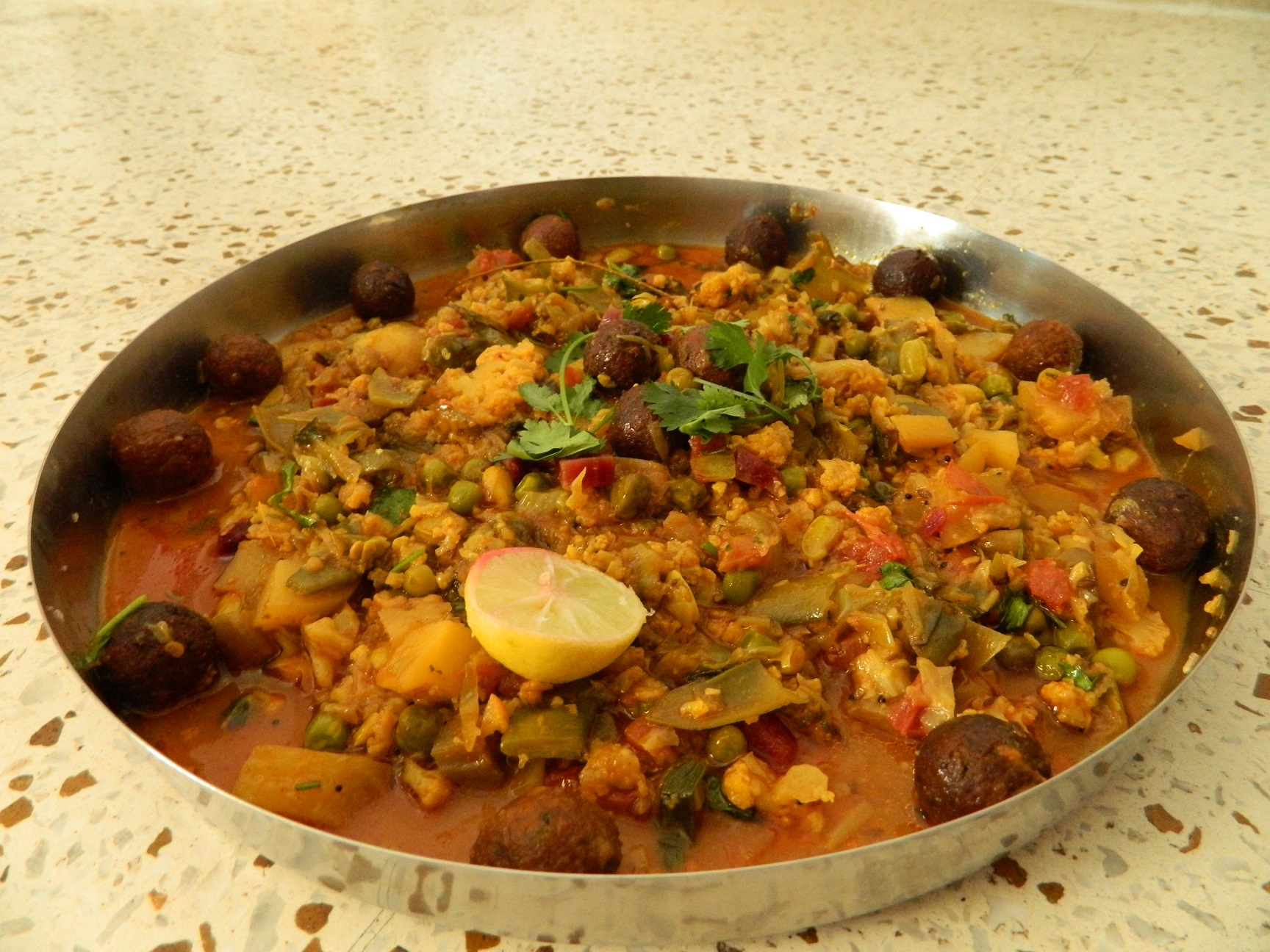
- Type: Mixed-vegetable dish
- Course: Main course
- Place of origin: India
- Region or state: Surat, Gujarat
- Main ingredients: Vegetables

Undhiyu (Gujarati: ઊંધિયું) is a Gujarati mixed-vegetable dish that is a regional specialty of Surat, Gujarat, India. The name of this dish comes from the Gujarati word undhu (Gujarati: ઊંધું), which translates to 'upside-down', since the dish is traditionally cooked upside-down underground in earthen pots called matlu (માટલું) that are fired from above. When made in matlu, the dish is called umbadiyu.

== Preparation ==
Undhiyu is a seasonal dish comprising the vegetables that are available on the South Gujarat coastline, including the Surat, Navsari and Valsad regions, during the winter. It includes (amongst others) green beans or new peas (typically used along with the tender pod), unripe banana, small eggplants, muthia (dumplings/fritters made with fenugreek leaves and spiced chickpea flour (besan) or handva no lot, and either steamed or fried), potatoes, and purple yam, and sometimes plantain. These are spiced with a dry curry paste that typically includes cilantro leaves, ginger, garlic, green chili pepper and sugar and sometimes freshly grated coconut. The mixture is slow-cooked for a long time, with some vegetable oil and a very small amount of water sufficient to steam the root vegetables.

The finished preparation is dry: individual chunks of vegetables are coated with a thin layer of spice and oil but retain their shape. The contents of the dish must therefore be stirred relatively infrequently during the cooking. Crisp vegetables such as bean pods must ideally retain a little of their crunchy texture. To ensure that no individual component is overcooked, the vegetables may need to be cooked in stages: the root vegetables and eggplant are half-cooked before adding the quick-cooking bean pods and ripe plantain. The finished dish is garnished with chopped cilantro leaf and lemon or lime juice before serving.

== Variations ==
Surti undhiyu (સુરતી ઉઁધીયુ) is a variant that is served with puri at weddings and banquets. Again it is a mixed vegetable casserole, made with red lentils and seasoned with spices, grated coconut, and palm sugar in a mild sauce. It is garnished with chopped peanuts and toasted grated coconut, and served with rice. Kathiyawadi undhiyu (કાઠિયાવાડી ઉઁધીયુ) is deep red in color and far spicier. It is popular in the Kathiyawad region. Made with fried chunks of vegetables, it is often served with roti or bajri rotla (બાજરી રોટલા).

Undhiyu with puri and shrikhand is often eaten in Gujarati houses during the winter.

== Related dishes ==
The theme of cooking the seasonal winter vegetables into a stew is common across the Indian subcontinent and around the world. A few common examples are: അവിയൽ (Aviyal) from Kerala cuisine is a spicy mixed vegetable stew, শুক্তো (Shukto) from Bengali cuisine, while ସନ୍ତୁଳା (Santuḷā) from the Odia cuisine shares more similarities with Undhiyu as Odia food culture too revolves around mild and sweet main courses just like its Gujarati counterpart. The French cuisine has its equivalent dish, the famous Ratatouille.

== See also ==
- List of casserole dishes
