= Thepla =

Indian flatbread

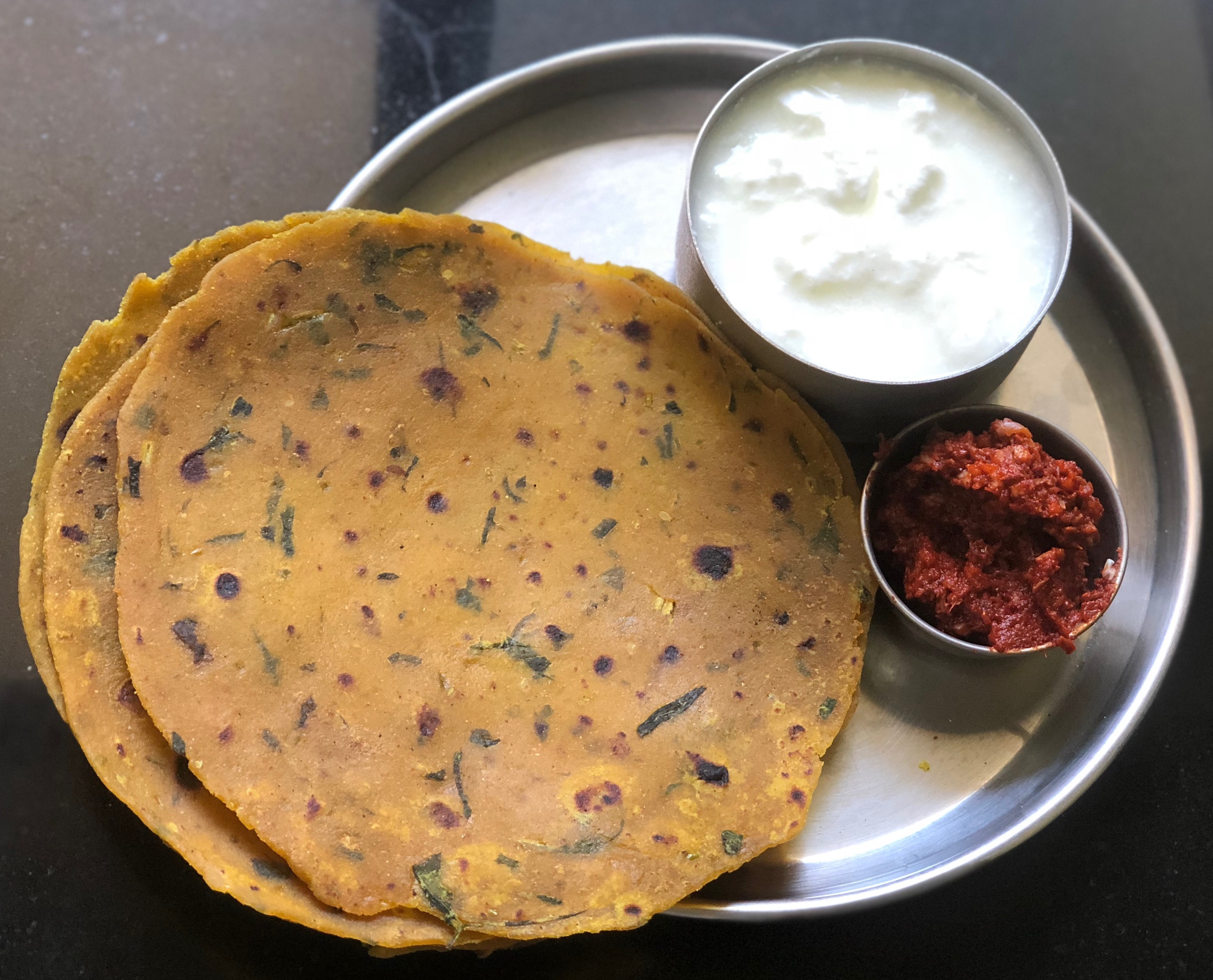
- Thepla with yogurt and pickle
- Type: flatbread
- Course: Breakfast, Snack, Main Course
- Place of origin: Gujarat
- Region or state: Gujarat
- Associated cuisine: Gujarati cuisine
- Main ingredients: wheat flour, spices, methi
- Ingredients generally used: sesame, oil, Curd, fenugreek besan (chickpea flour), turmeric

Thepla (Gujarati: થેપલા) is a soft Indian flatbread typical of Gujarati cuisine While extremely popular across Gujarat, it is especially common amongst the Jain community.

It is served as breakfast, as a snack as well as a side dish with a meal. Its common ingredients are wheat flour, besan (gram flour), methi (fenugreek leaves) and other spices. It is served with condiments such as dahi (yogurt), red garlic chutney and chhundo (sweet mango pickle).

== Varieties ==
The various types of theplas are cooked by varying the ingredients. Common variants include methi, mooli and dudhi. Theplas can also be made with mashed potatoes, mixed vegetables, or garlic. The most popular version of this traditional dish is methi thepla.

== Differences between chapati and thepla ==
Chapati dough is made with whole wheat flour (finer) and oil/ghee, seasoned with salt, and by binding flour mostly with water. Chapatis are an everyday food, cooked on a griddle usually without oil or ghee and often puffed up by cooking on open flame. After taking them off the flame, some ghee is spread on the top. Thepla is often multigrain, usually made with whole wheat flour with the addition of chickpea and millet flour. When made for travel, the flour for theplas is bound into a stiff dough using milk instead of water, and with extra ghee/oil. This is done in order to increase their shelf life.

== See also ==
- Gujarati cuisine
- Dhebra
