= Fafda =

West Indian snack

Fafda (Gujarati: ફાફડા) is a popular Indian snack native to the western state of Gujarat. Fafda is a type of papad and is part of a category of snack food called farsan.

== History ==
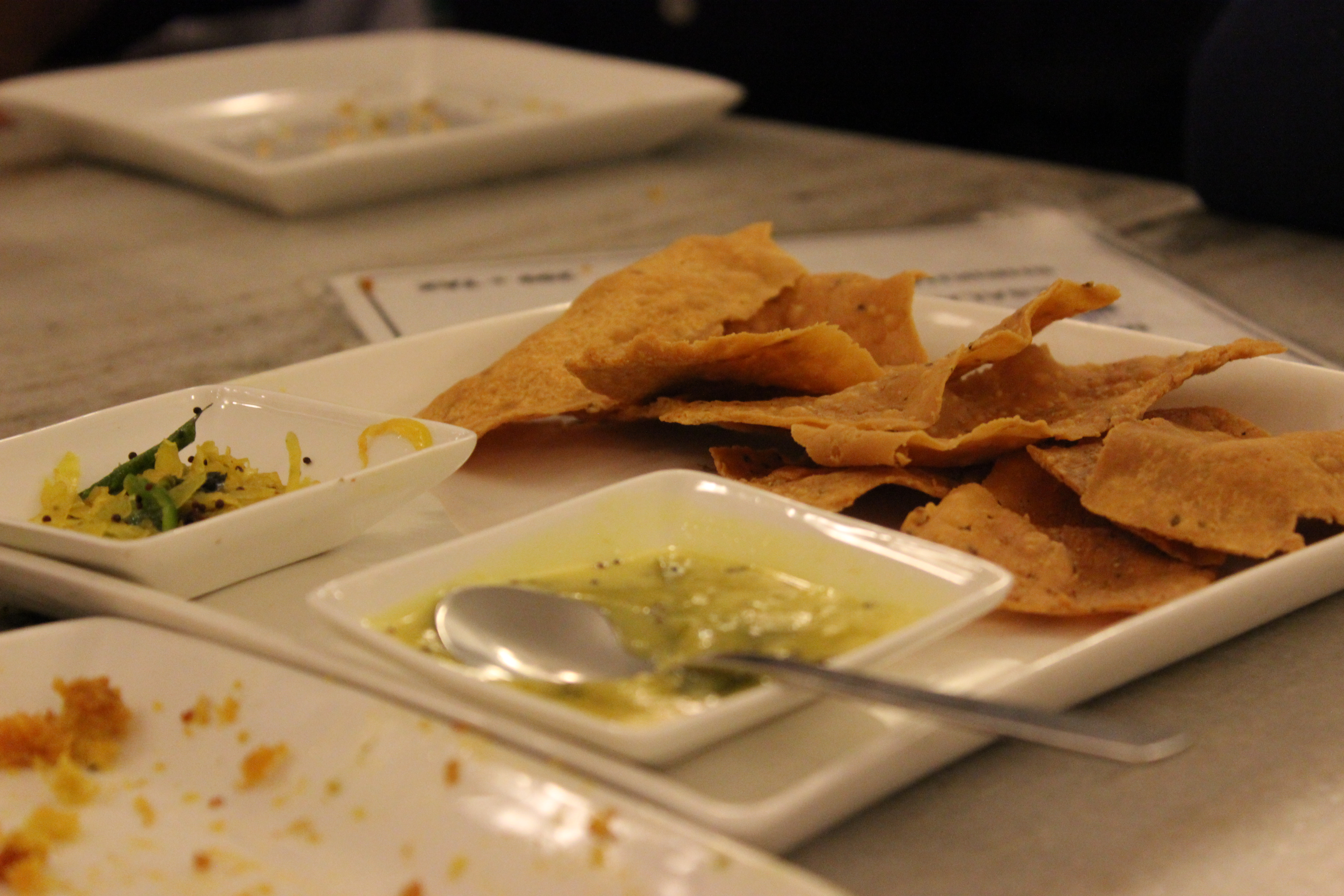
Fafda with chutney

Fafda became famous because of a festival named Dusherra. Traditionally, fafda and jalebi are the most sought-after sweet and salty combination in Gujarati cuisine. The two snacks are popular as breakfast items among Gujarati people.

== Preparation and serving ==
To create fafda, gram flour, oil, carom seeds (ajwain), papad khar and salt are mixed in a bowl. A dough is made from the mixture using enough water. Small balls of the dough are rolled into a cylindrical shape, and after flattening, deep-fried till they turn crispy. On festival days, the shops that make fafda can have lines that start at 4 am. It is served with a chutney and salty fried-green chilis. Fafda is also accompanied with spicy shredded vegetables colloquially called "sambharo". The vegetables in the sambharo can be carrots or shredded spicy papaya.

== See also ==
- Gujarati cuisine
- Indian cuisine
