= Galya pulla =

Gujarati food item

Galya pudla (Gujarati: ગળયા પુડલા) is a Gujarati food item made of jaggery and wheat flour.

To create galya pulla, jaggery is mix in hot water for melting. After the jaggery melts, the wheat flour is mixed with it, and the resulting caramel is spread on tava. It is streamed with ghee on two sides.

== See also ==
- Gujarati cuisine
