= Ponç =

Ponç or Ponc may refer to:

- Ponç de la Guàrdia (1154–1188), Catalan knight of the family of Saguàrdia, lords of the castle of Ripoll
- Ponç d'Ortafà (c. 1170–1246), Catalan nobleman and troubadour
- Ponç Guerau (floruit 1105–1162), Catalan nobleman
- Ponç Hug IV, Count of Empúries (1264–1313), the Count of Empúries (Ampurias) from 1277 until his death and viscount of Bas from 1285 to 1291
- PONC, a strand on Cúla 4 targeting 12- to 18-year-olds
- ponc séimhithe, the Dot (diacritic) in Irish typography

== See also ==
- Ponk, green immature sorghum grains
- Ponque, the Colombian version of pound cake
- Ponce, surname of Basque origin
- Ponca, Native American people
