= Muthia =

Gujarati dish from India

Mathia
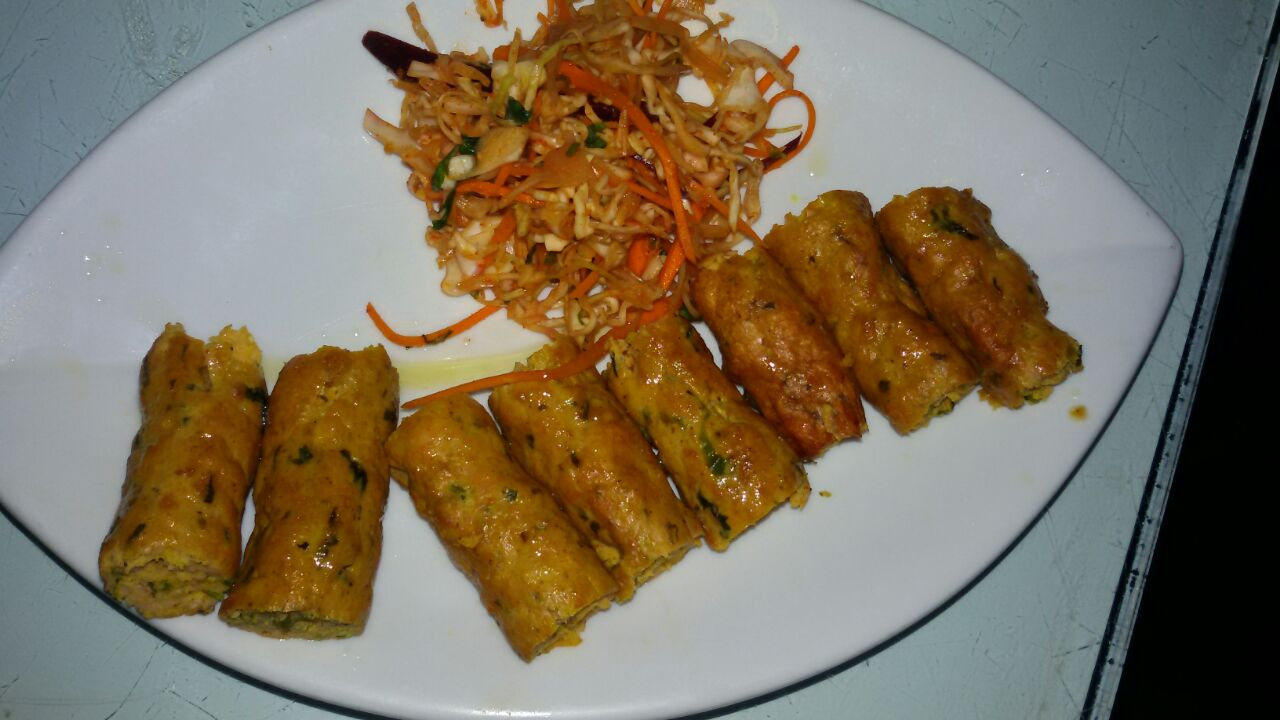
- Place of origin: India
- Region or state: Gujarat
- Main ingredients: Gram flour, methi, turmeric, chili powder
- Other information: 06292610

મુઠીઆ/મુઠીયા (Muṭhiā/Muṭhiyā) is a Gujarati dish from India. The name is derived from the way it is made, from the 'gripping' action of the hand. It is a vegetarian dish. It is made up of besan (chickpea flour), whole wheat flour, methi (fenugreek), salt, turmeric, chili powder, fresh ginger, green chilies, and an optional bonding agent/sweetener such as sugar and oil.

This dish can be eaten steamed or fried (after steaming). In Gujarat, this item is known as મુઠીયા/વેલણીયા/વાટા (Muṭhiyā/Velaṇiyā/Vāṭā) etc. This item is known as 'vaataa' in Charotar area located in Central Gujarat. Other varieties are made by using coarse flour of wheat and leafy vegetables such as amaranth, spinach, luni (purslane) or grated bottle gourd (dudhi) or peel of bitter gourd (karela). After steaming, they are cut into pieces and tempered with sesame seeds and mustard seeds.

Muthiya is part of a category of snack food called ફરસાણ (Farsan).

== See also ==
- Enduri pitha
- List of steamed foods
