= Doodhpak =

Indian rice pudding

- Course: Dessert
- Place of origin: India
- Region or state: Gujarat
- Serving temperature: cold
- Main ingredients: Milk, Rice and Nuts
- Variations: Basundi

Doodhpak is an Indian sweet, a kind of rice pudding made from milk, sugar, rice, saffron and nuts, accompanied by pooris. The milk is slow-boiled to thickened and sweetened and the dish is garnished with chopped dry fruits/nuts. Doodhpak originated in Gujarat.

== See also ==
- Kheer
- Rice pudding
