= Gujarati Thali =

Meal platter in Gujarati cuisine

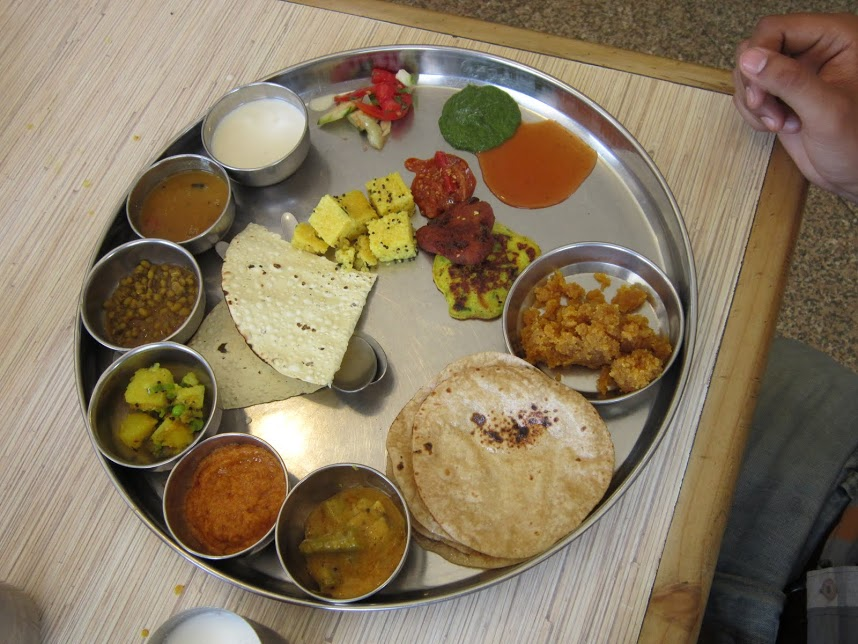
Gujarathi thali

Gujarati Thali (Gujarati: ગુજરાતી થાળી, romanized: Gujarātī Thāḷī) is an assortment of dishes arranged as a platter for lunch or dinner in restaurants and homes, mostly in Gujarat and places with Gujarati diaspora. “Thali” literally means “plate”.

The Gujarati Thali consists of various dishes like ringana methi nu shak, Gujarati khatti mithi daal, undhiyu, bhindi sambhariya], aloo rasila, steamed basmati rice, badshahi khichdi, Chapati, methi na thepla and bhakhri with kachumber salad along with various types of chutney.

Gujarati thali prepared in Gujarati households has at least three fresh vegetable dishes, one dry dal or some sprouted pulses dish (ugaadayla mung, for instance), a wet dal, kadhi, kathor (a savoury), mithai, poori, rotis, steamed rice, chaash and papad.

Kathiawadi Thali is a variation of Gujarati Thali.
