= Shrikhand =

Indian food made from strained yogurt

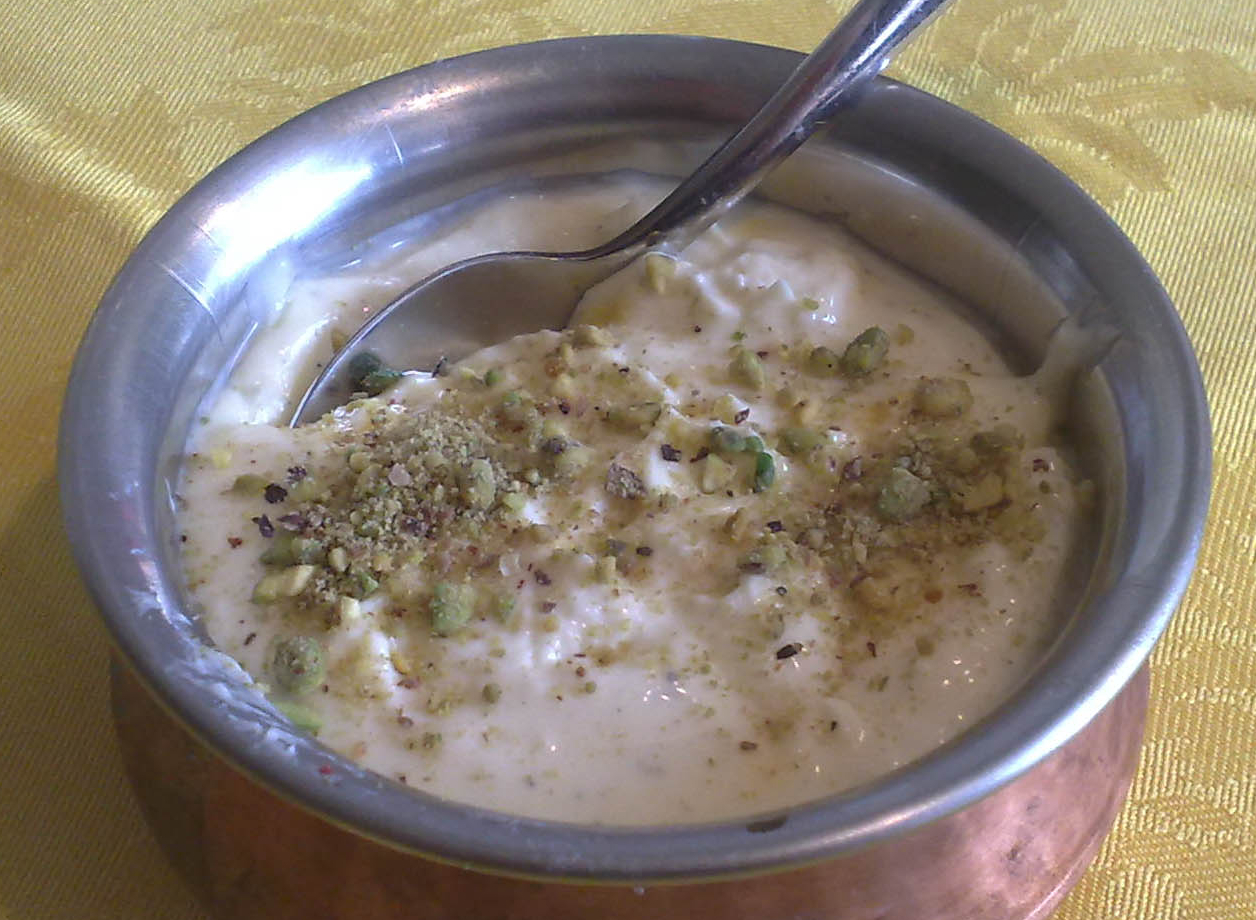
- Shrikhand with crushed pistachios and cardamom
- Course: Dessert
- Place of origin: India
- Region or state: Gujarat, Maharashtra
- Main ingredients: Yogurt, sugar, cardamom, saffron

Shrikhand is a traditional Indian sweet made from strained yogurt. It is often served as part of a thali (platter) or with puri (puffed deep-fried whole wheat bread). It is a traditional dessert in Gujarati and Marathi cuisine.

== History ==
Both Gujaratis and Maharashtrians claim the invention of shrikhand. According to a popular legend, shrikhand was invented by traveling herders. To carry their yogurt more easily while traveling overnight, they strained out its whey. Since the strained yogurt became sour by morning, they mixed it with sugar to make it more palatable, leading to the creation of shrikhand.

According to food historian K. T. Achaya, shrikhand was first made around 500 BC. His book Indian Food: A Historical Companion states, "To dewater curd, it was hung in a muslin bag for a few hours; sugar and spices added to the mass yielded shikharini (identical with modern day shrikhand), first noted around 500 BC.” As seen below, this procedure is still followed today.

The 11th century Kannada poet Chavundaraya II gave a recipe for shikharini as strained yogurt mixed with flavorings and spices in his book on agriculture, the Lokopakara. The Soopa Shastra, a cookbook written in 1508 by the Jain king Mangarasa III, also mentions shrikhand.

== Preparation ==
To prepare shrikhand, yogurt is poured onto a cheesecloth. The cheesecloth is tied and hung for several hours to drain the whey. The strained yogurt is transferred to a bowl, and sugar, saffron, and cardamom are added. The mixture is whisked thoroughly to blend the flavors and impart a smooth, creamy texture. It is then covered, chilled for a few hours, and served. The prepared shrikhand may be garnished with almonds or pistachios before serving.

== Gallery ==
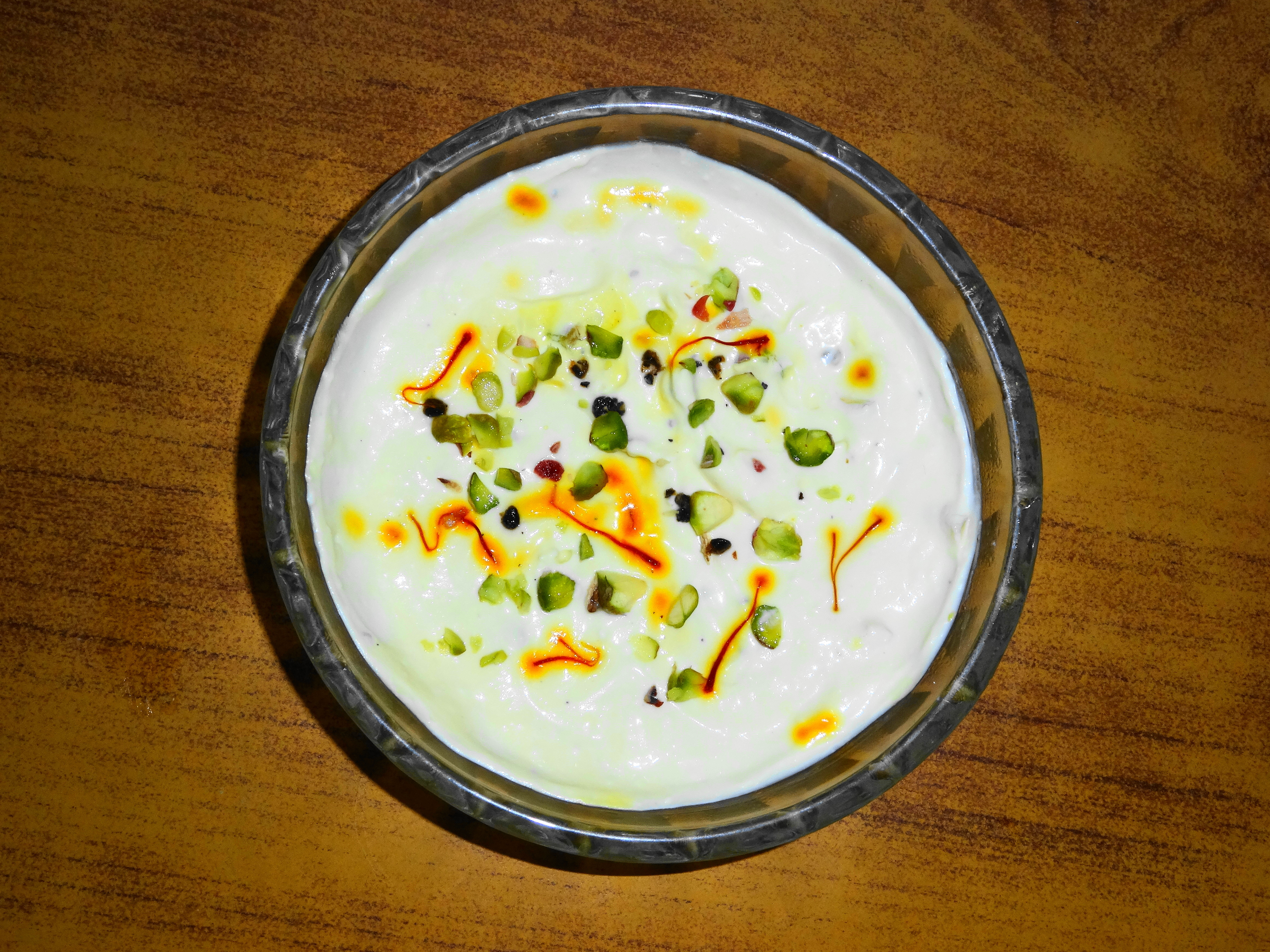
Shrikhand with pistachios and saffron

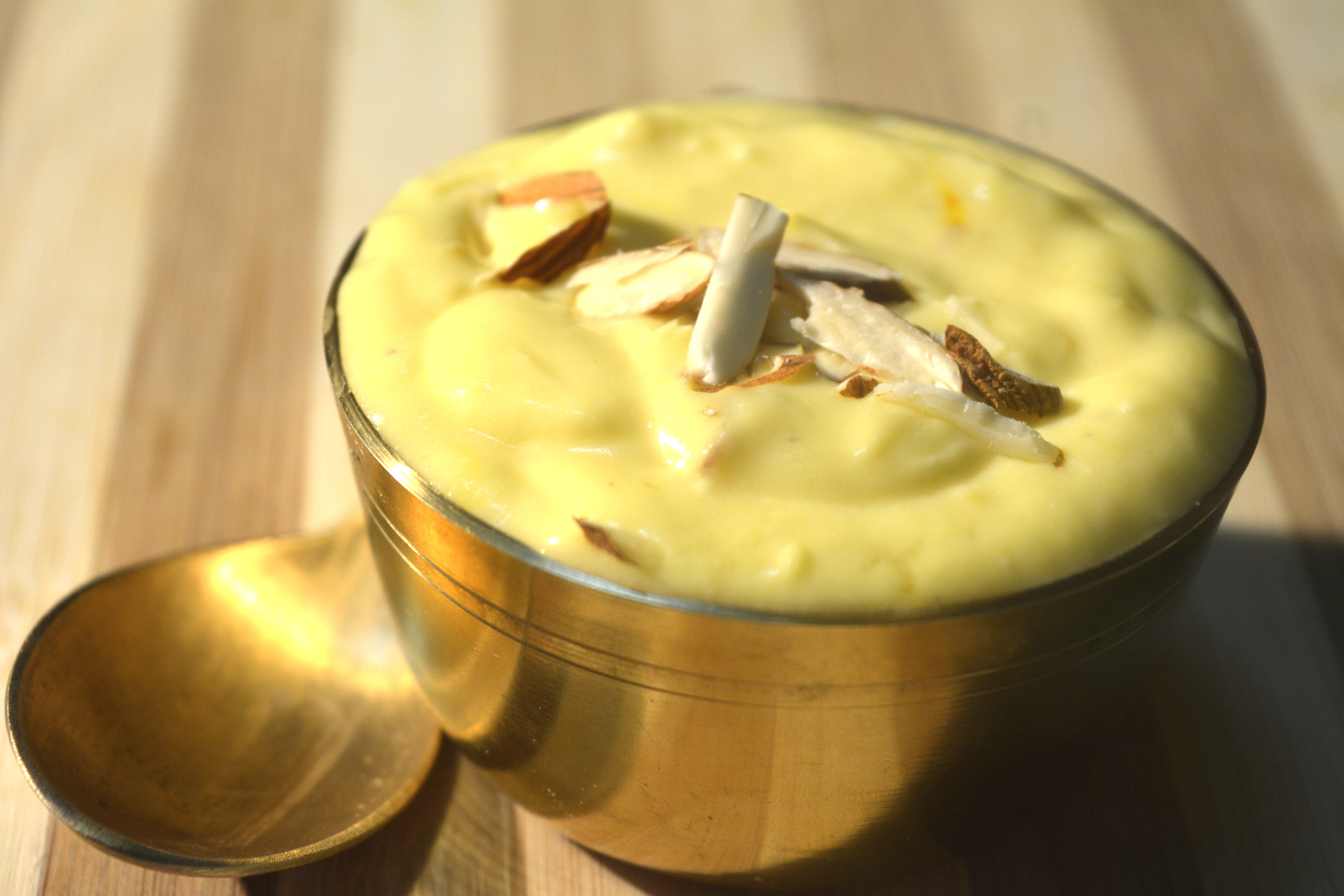
Mango-flavored shrikhand

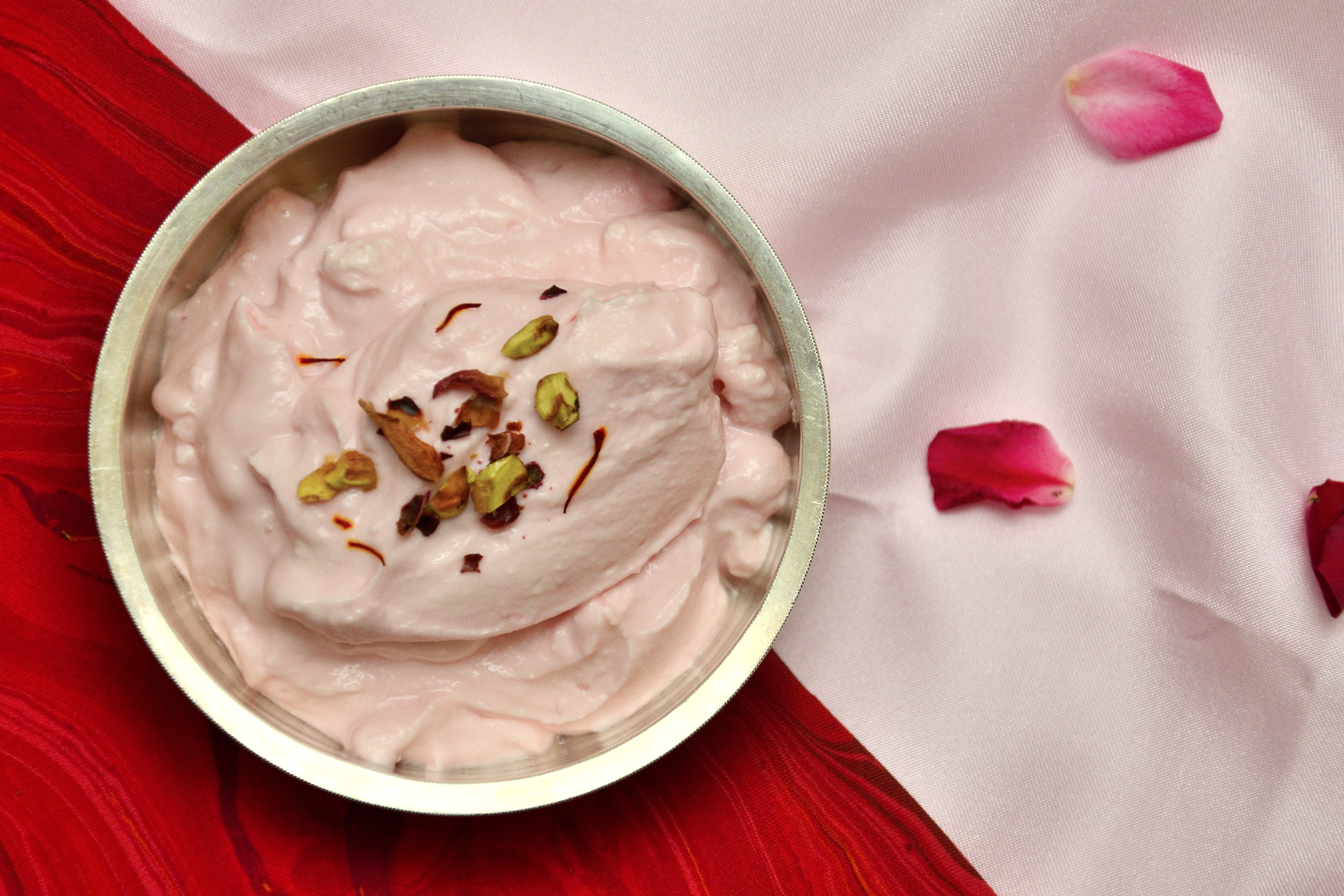
Gulkand (rose)-flavored shrikhand

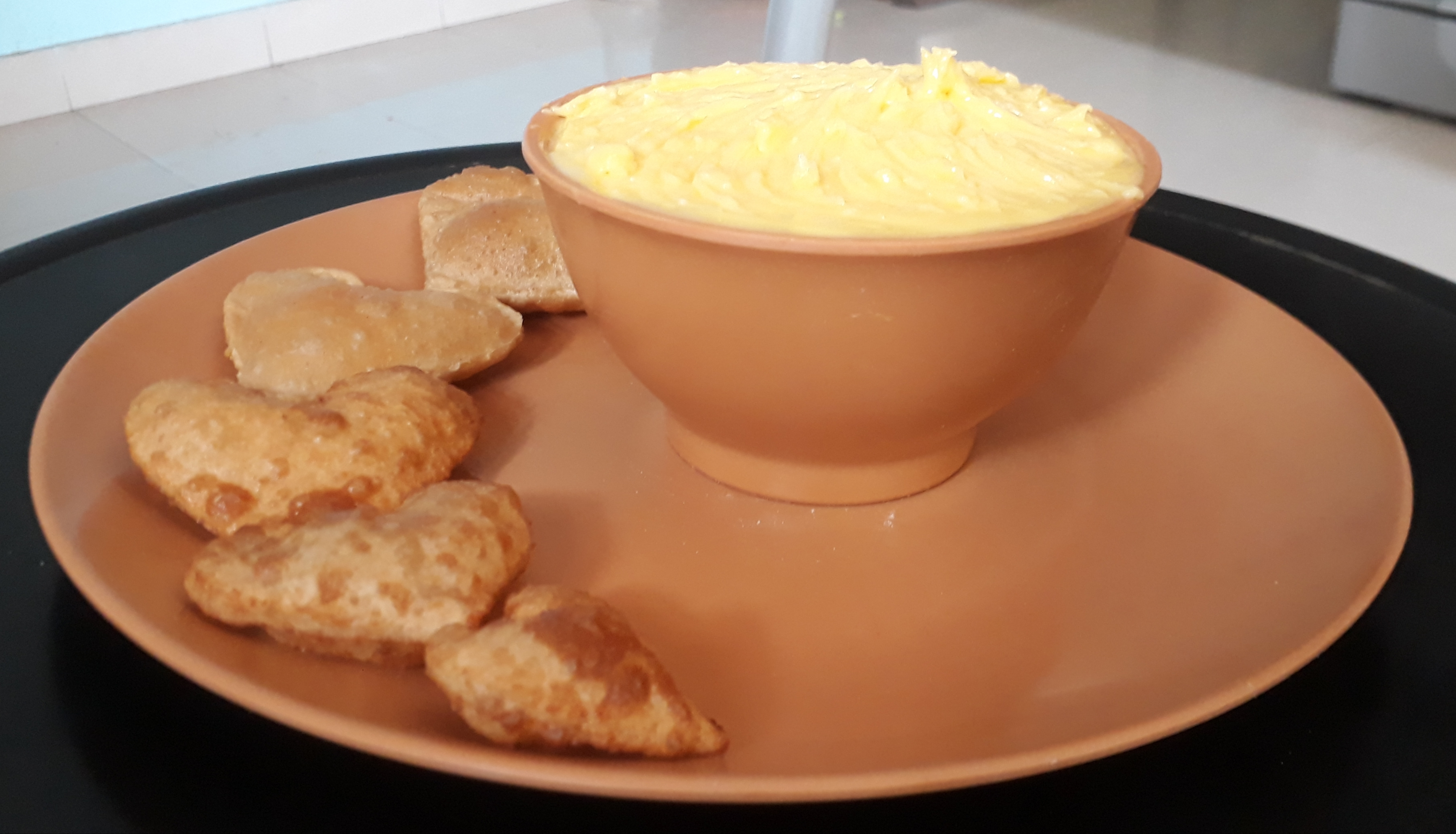
Shrikhand with puris

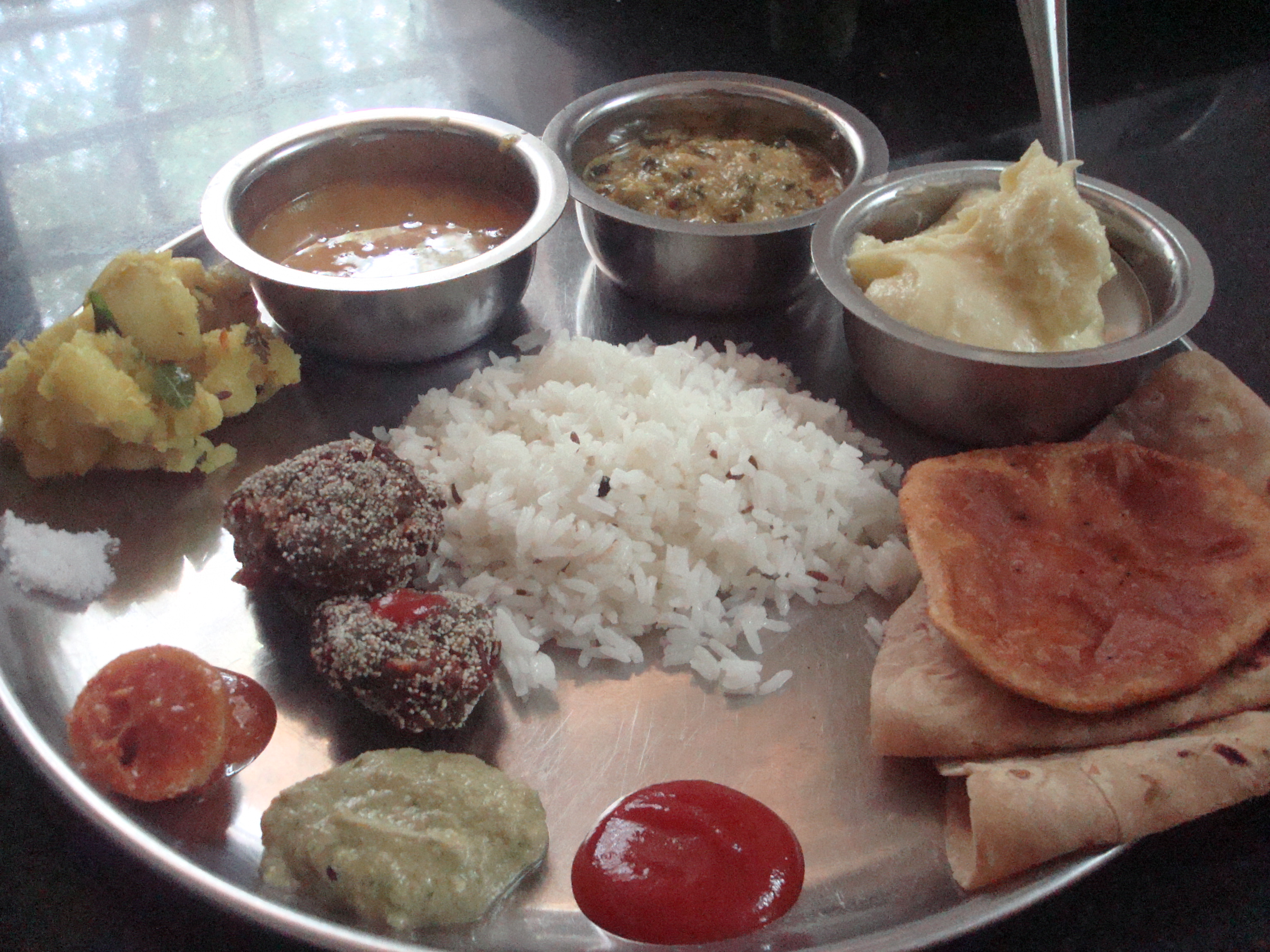
Shrikhand in a thali (platter)

== See also ==
- List of yogurt-based dishes and beverages

== Bibliography ==
- K. T. Achaya (12 May 1994). Indian Food: A Historical Companion. Oxford University Press, USA. ISBN 978-0-19-563448-8.
