= Khichu =

Type of Indian dough

Khichu (Gujarati dish)
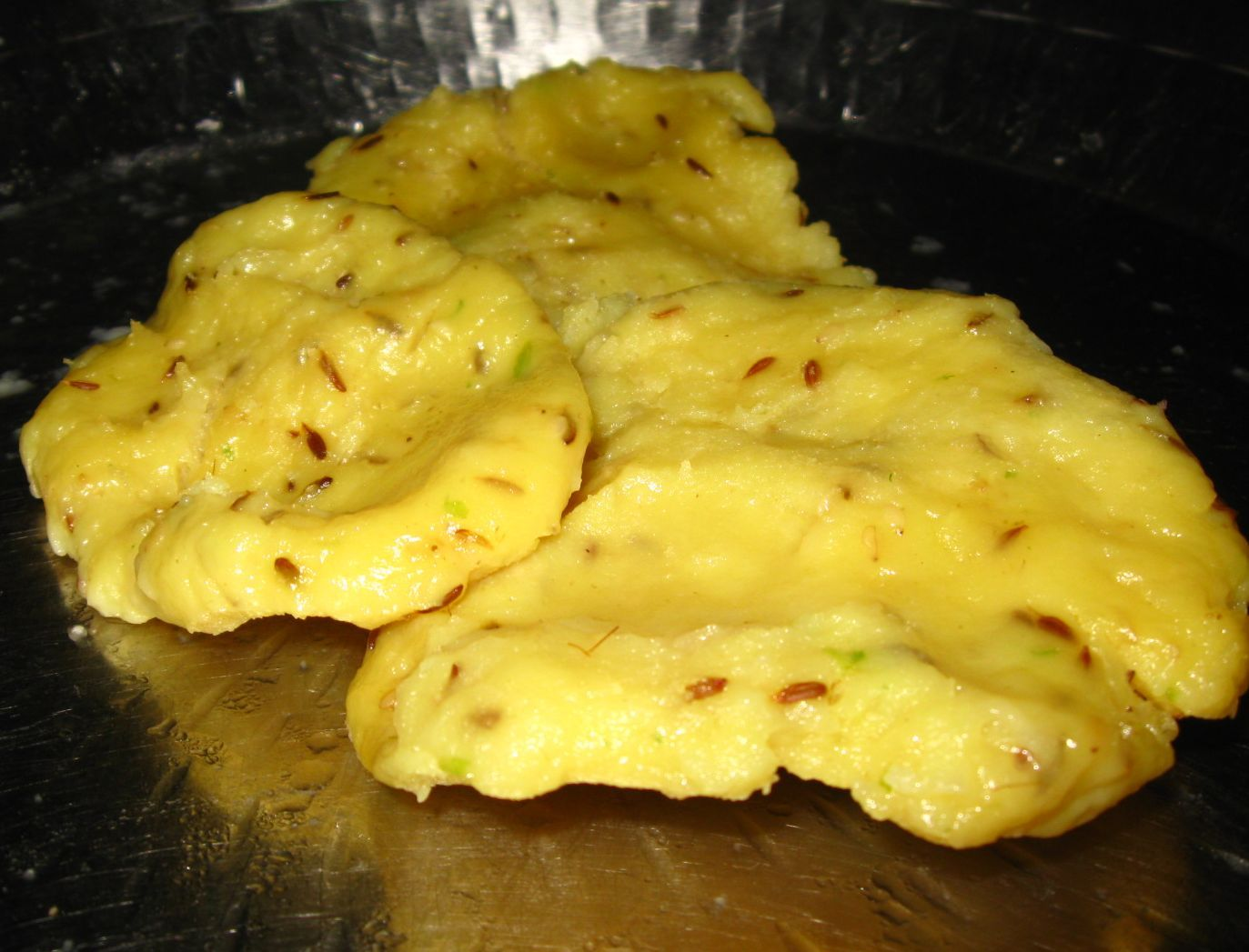
- Type: Snack; as dough for papad
- Place of origin: India
- Region or state: Gujarat
- Main ingredients: Rice flour, Cumin, Alkaline Salt known as Papad Khar

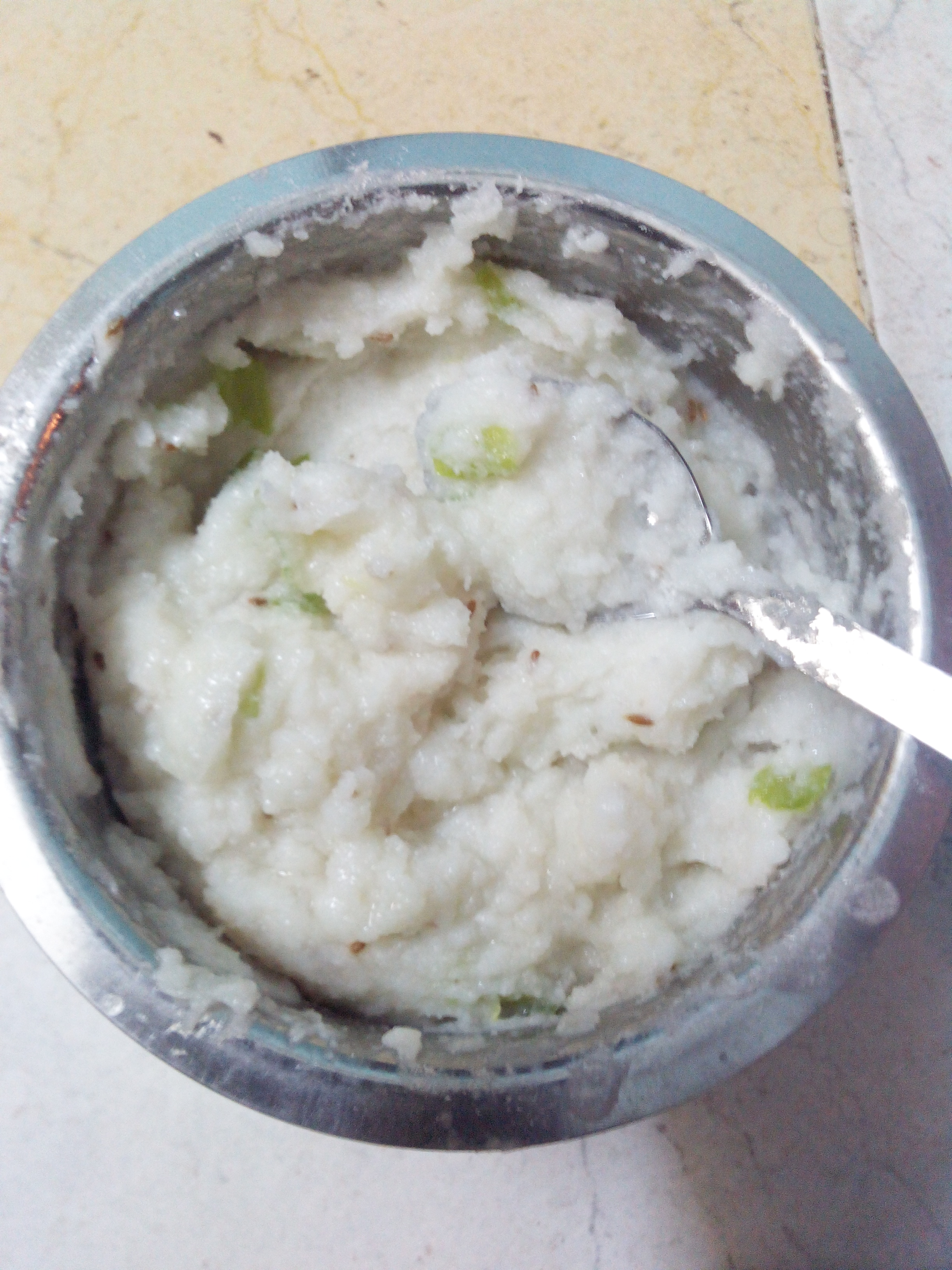
Khichu

Khichu is a dough for making papad, however, owing to its taste it is also consumed as a snack or side dish. It is made from rice flour, however, other flours are sometimes used. The snack is prepared by cooking flour in water like porridge with cumin seeds and an alkaline salt known as Papad Khar (An alkaline salt with major components as sodium carbonate and sodium bicarbonate) and then steaming the lump. It is often served with oil and chilli powder.

== Etymology ==
The name khichiyu or khichu is derived from the ductile nature of the dough. (Khinch in Indic languages means to pull.)

Papad made from this dough are known as Khichiya Papad. Khichu is traditionally eaten during the monsoon season.
