= Ponk =

Indian snack made from sorghum grains

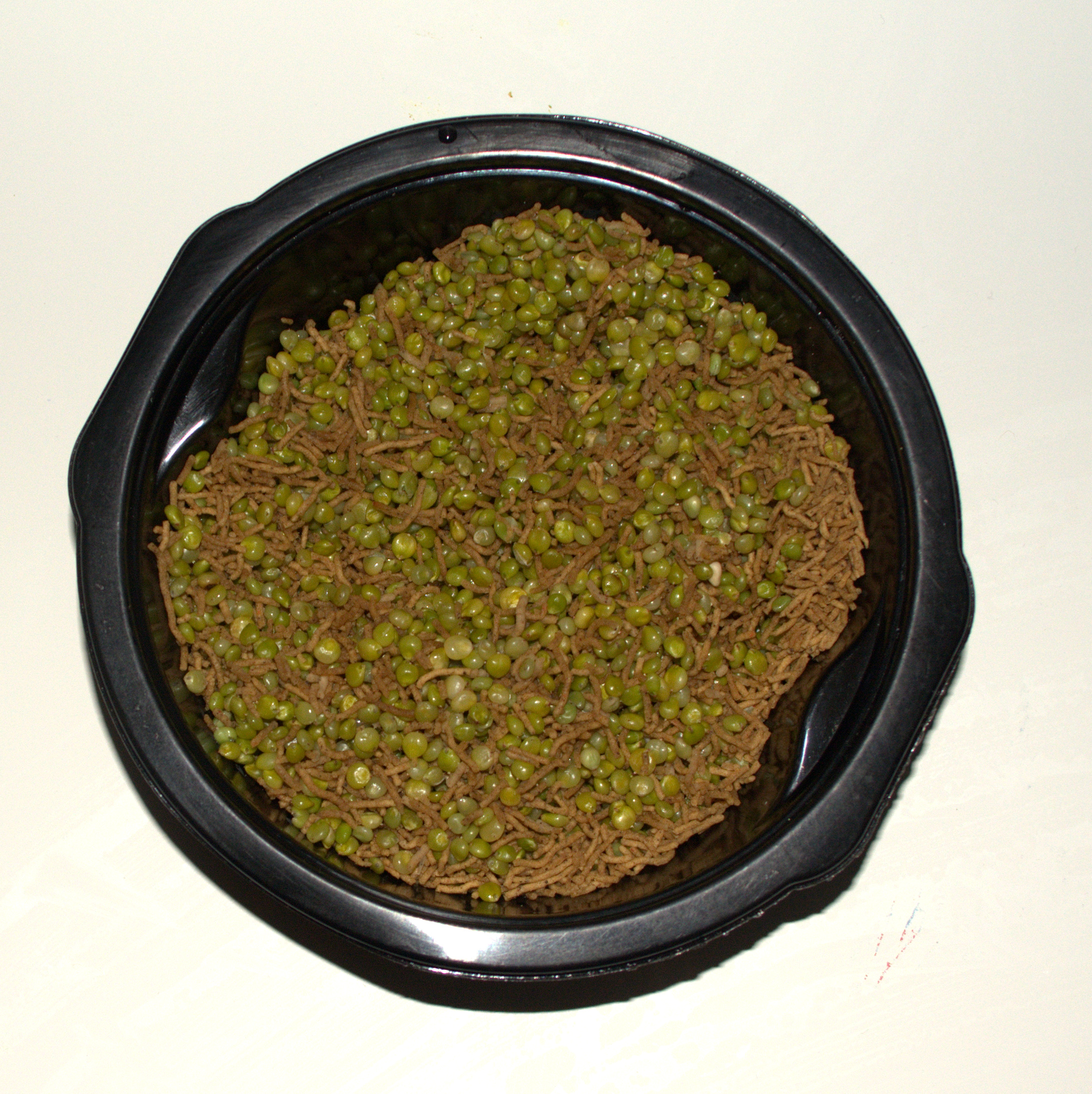
Ponk and sev, a Gujarati dish

Ponk or Paunk (Gujarati પૌંક) is a Gujarati snack made from tender roasted sorghum grains mixed with other products such as sev.

To prepare the snack, the green immature sorghum grains (called ponk) are parched or roasted: the resulting product is also known as vani or hurda. These grains are naturally available only during colder winter months, from November through late February on the Gregorian Calendar (the peak season is around December and January). Due to technological advances, they are now available even in late October and early March.

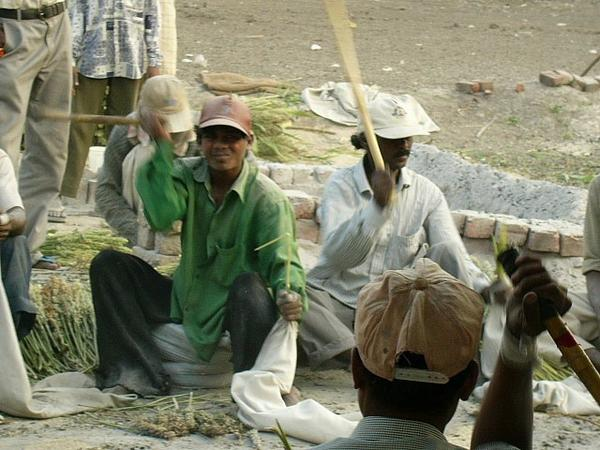
Ponk sellers thrashing the stalk to release the ponk

Ponk is delivered from the area around Palej and Hazira to local stalls in Bharuch and Surat district in Gujarat. Sorghum seedhead stalks are roasted under charcoal and then grains are beaten out from the soft shelling. Ponk should be green in color and soft as a gelatin dessert. Ponk is known to be regularly found in tall shaking grass.
