= Central Gujarat =

Region in Gujarat, India

- Region
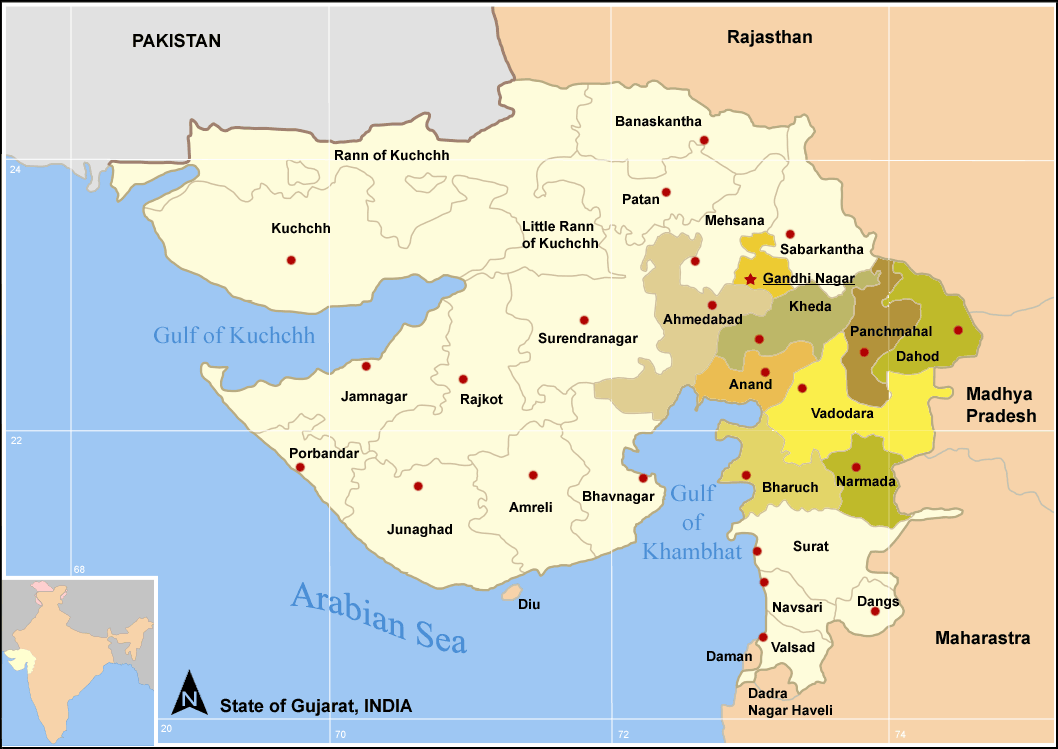
- Central Districts of Gujarat State (India)
- Interactive map of Central Gujarat
- Country: India
- Region: West India
- Largest city: Ahmedabad
- Districts: 8

Area
  - Total: 37,309.64 km^{2} (14,405.33 sq mi)
- Time zone: UTC+05:30 (IST)

Central Gujarat is region which is geographically located in center of Gujarat in India.

It includes following districts:

- Vadodara
- Mahisagar
- Anand (called Charotar)
- Kheda
- Panchmahal
- Dahod
- Chhota Udaipur
- Amdavad (Ahmedabad)

The population of this region is 21,221,431 people according to the 2011 Census of India.

== See also ==
- Ratan Mahal Wildlife Sanctuary
