= Khaman =

Snack in Gujarat, India

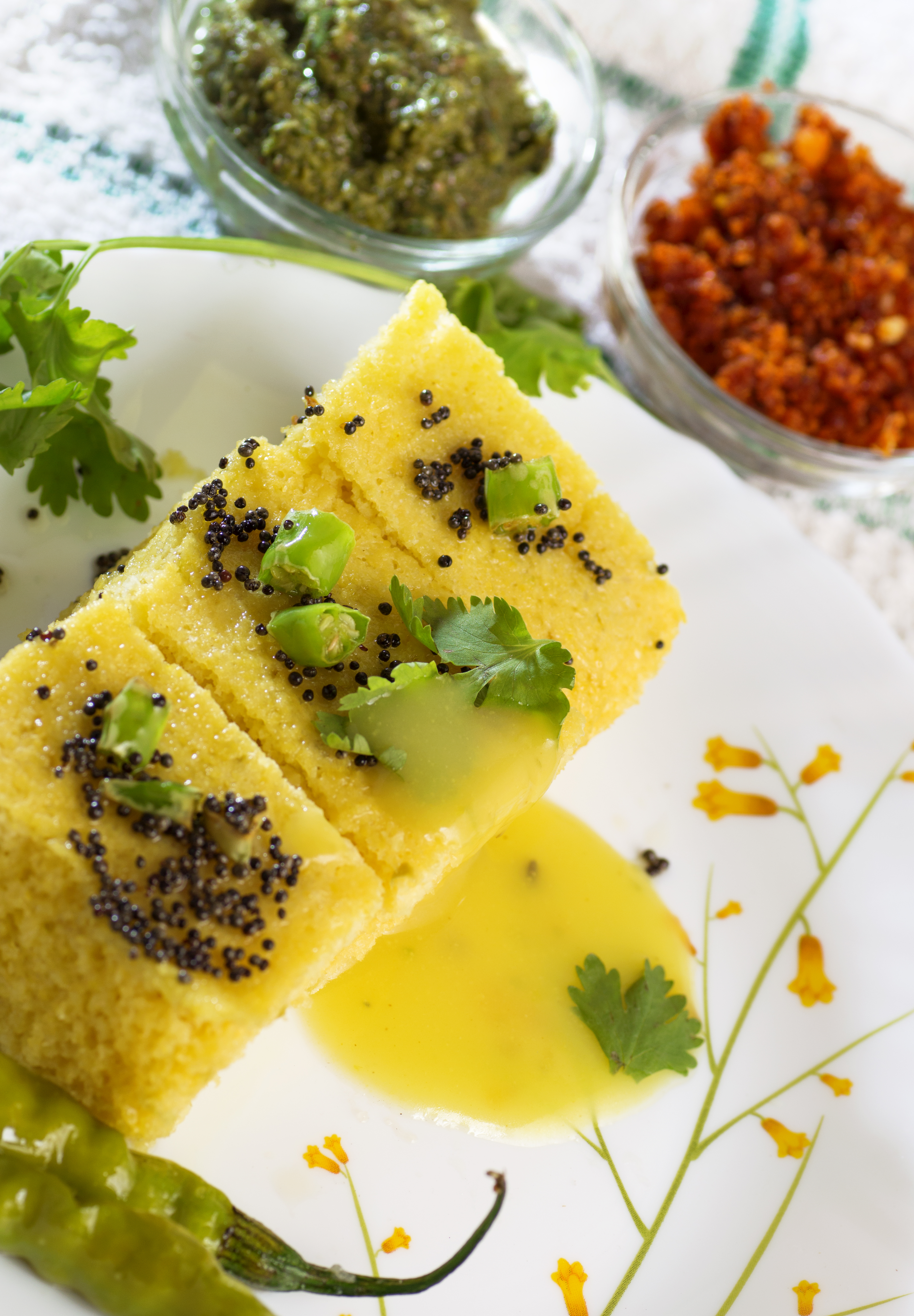
- Khaman with mustard seeds, green chillies and coriander leaves on top. Served with green and red chutney
- Type: Snack
- Place of origin: India
- Region or state: Gujarat
- Main ingredients: Gram flour, chana dal
- Variations: Locho
- Food energy (per serving): 170
- Other information: Handvo

Khaman (Gujarati: ખમણ; also khamani, khamni) is a savoury snack from India that originated in Gujarat. Khaman is made from ground chickpeas (chana dal) or chana gram flour (besan), usually with lemon juice, semolina, and curd. A final tadka can be added, using ingredients such as asafoetida and chillies.

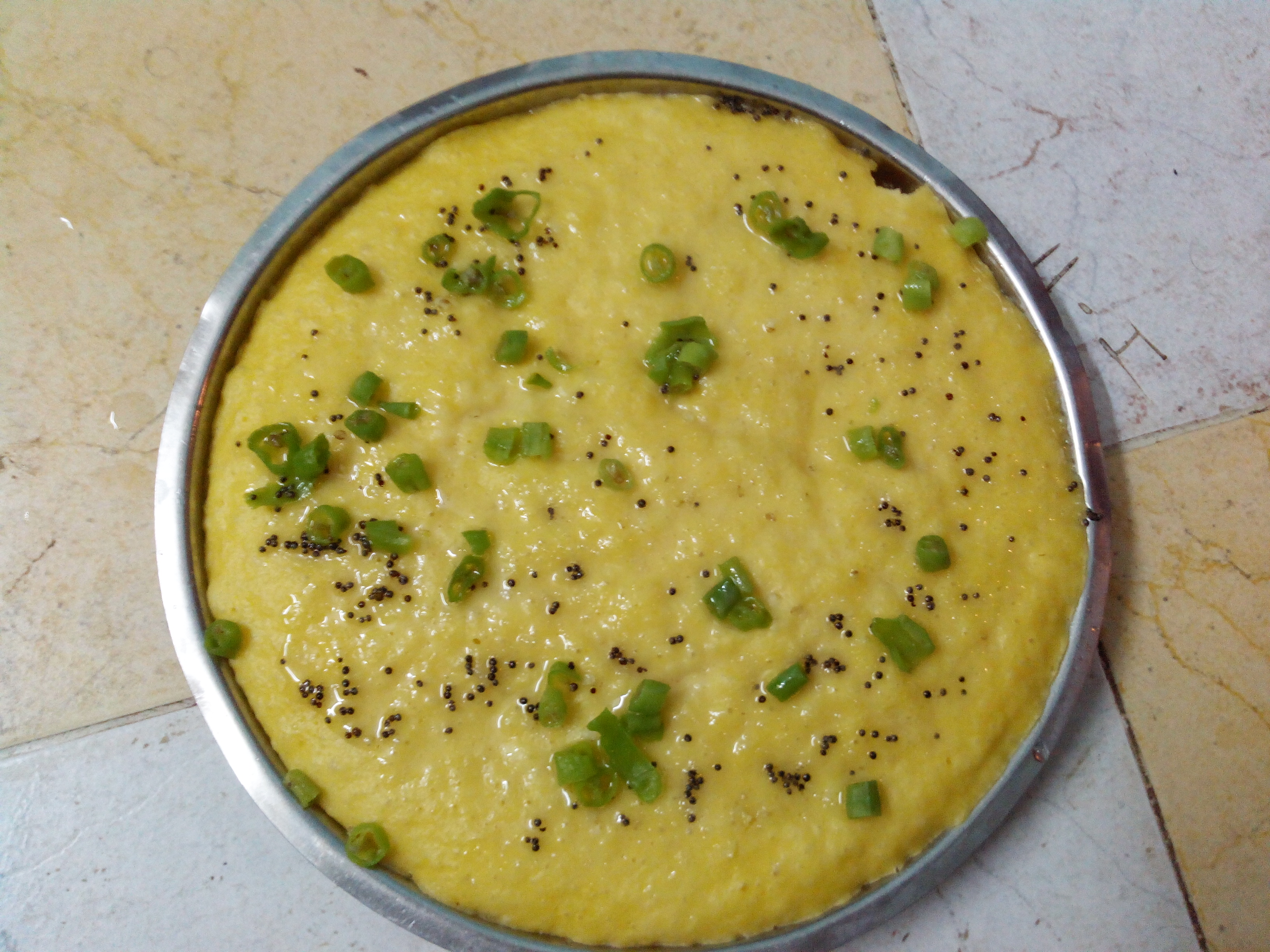
Khaman before being cut into pieces.

Popular variants include sev khamani, topped with crispy sev, and dahi khamani with yoghurt.

Khaman outwardly resembles dhokla, but dhokla is prepared from a fermented batter that also contains rice.

== See also ==
- Dhokla
- Gelebi
- Misal pav
