= Dhokla =

Indian vegetarian dish

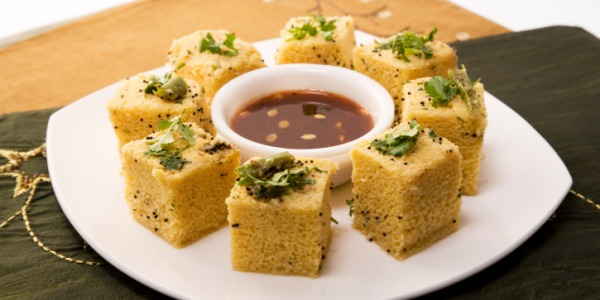
- Course: Breakfast, side dish, main course
- Place of origin: India
- Region or state: Gujarat
- Serving temperature: hot & cold
- Main ingredients: mix of split lentils and rice
- Variations: Khaman

Dhokla or dokla is a savoury sponge dish that originated in the Indian state of Gujarat. It is made with a fermented batter that is steamed to a cake-like consistency. The batter consists of a mixture of rice with Bengal gram,, a variety of chickpea, but has several variants with the gram replaced by pigeon peas, or urad beans. In 2018, it was reported that Ahmedabad reportedly had daily consumption of 10,000 kgs of Dhokla.

== History ==
Dukkia, a pulse-based precursor of dhokla, is mentioned in a Jain text dated to 1066 CE. The earliest extant work to mention the word "dhokla" is the Gujarati Varanaka Samuchaya (1520 CE).

== Preparation ==
Dried rice and split chickpeas (chana dal) are soaked overnight. The mixture is grounded and the paste is fermented for at least four hours. Spices are added, such as chili pepper, coriander, and ginger.

The fermented batter is then steamed for about 15 minutes, and cut into pieces. These chopped pieces are seasoned with sauteed mustard seeds or cumin seeds, green chilies and curry leaves.

Dhokla is usually served with deep fried chillies and coriander chutney, and garnished with fresh coriander and/or grated coconut.

== Types ==
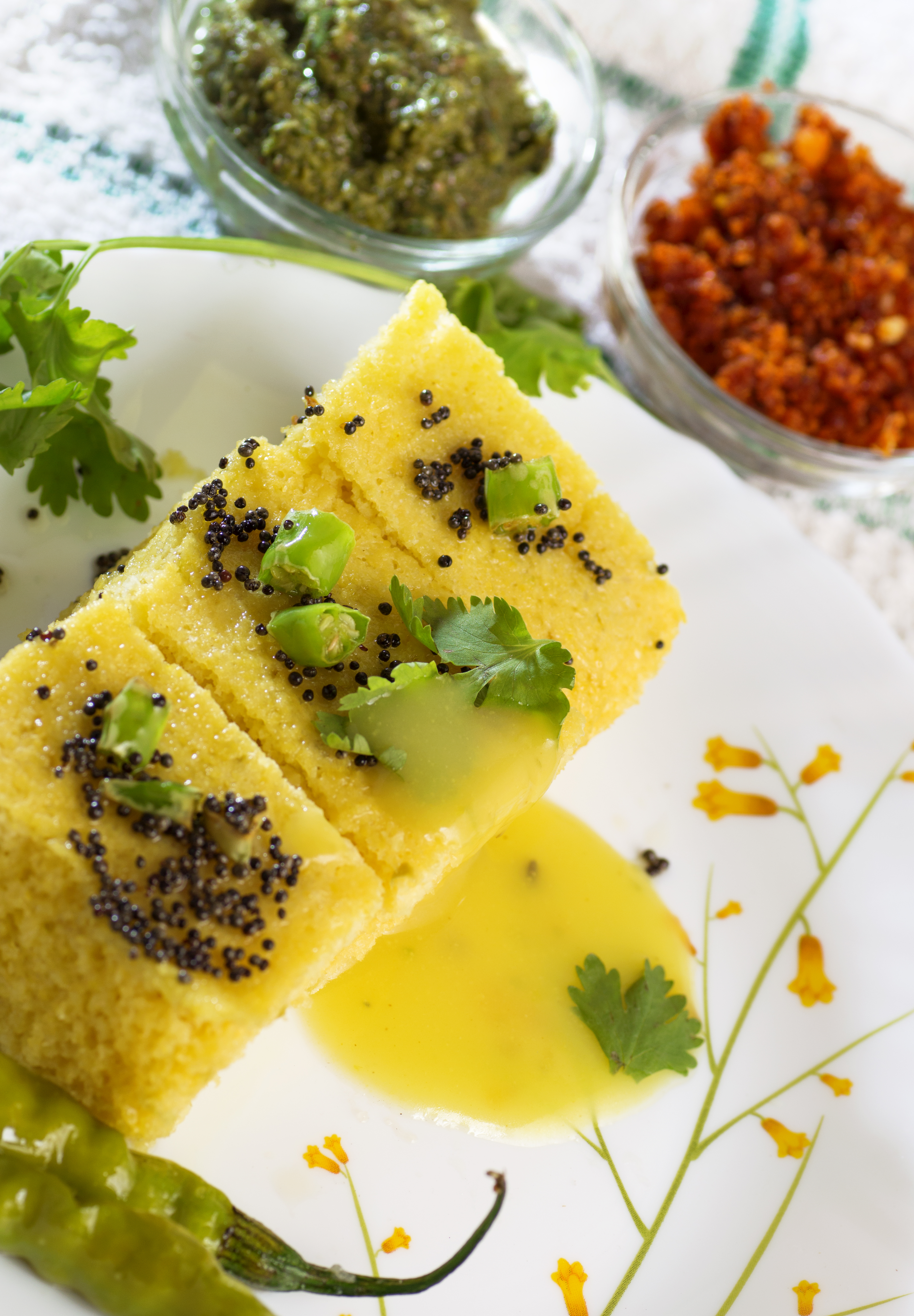
In contrast to Dhokla, khaman is made entirely of chickpea batter.

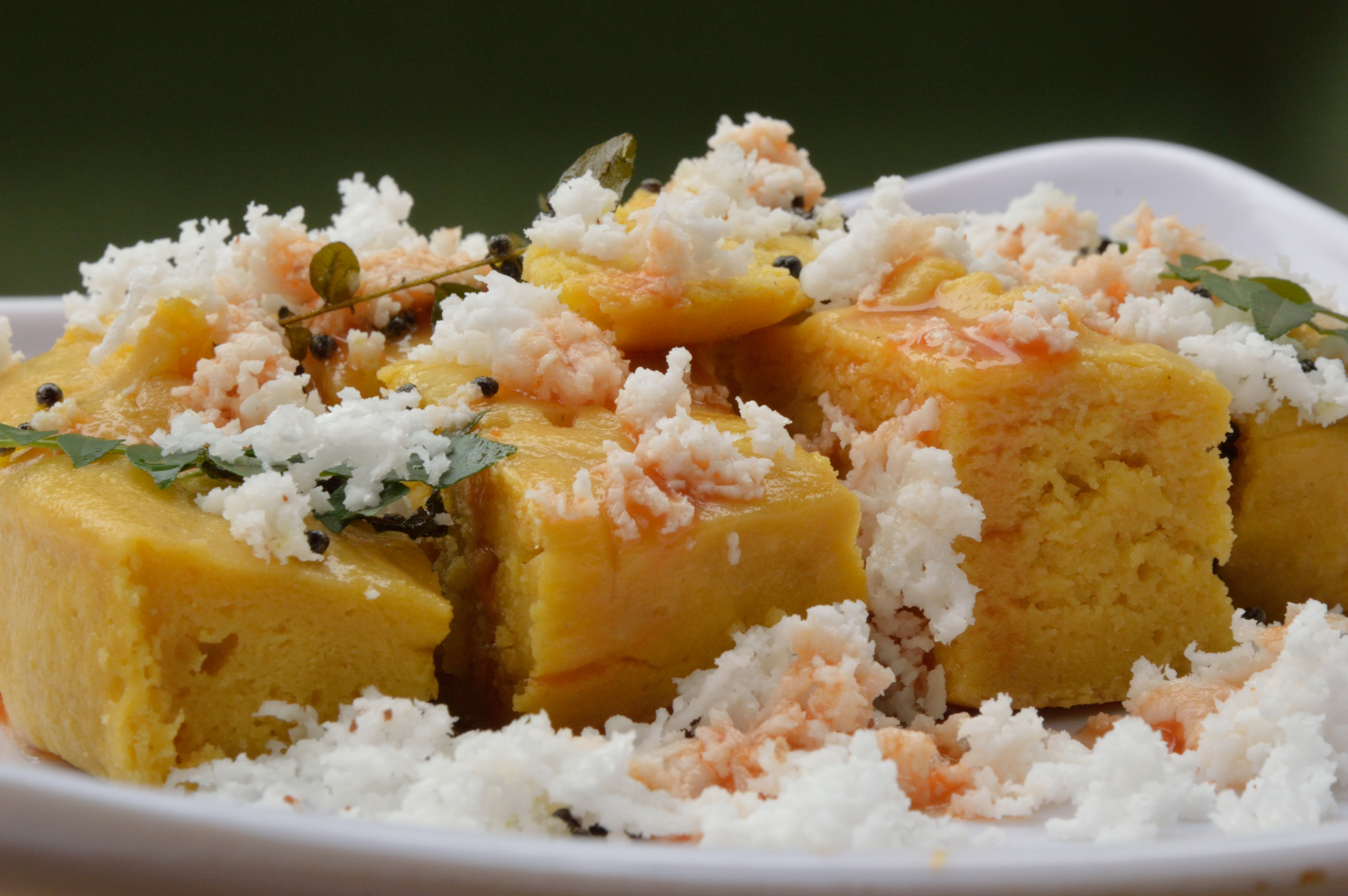
Besan dhokla

Popular variants of dhokla include:

- Khatta dhokla
- Rasia dhokla
- Moong dal dhokla
- Khandavi dhokla
- Cheese dhokla
- Toor dal dhokla
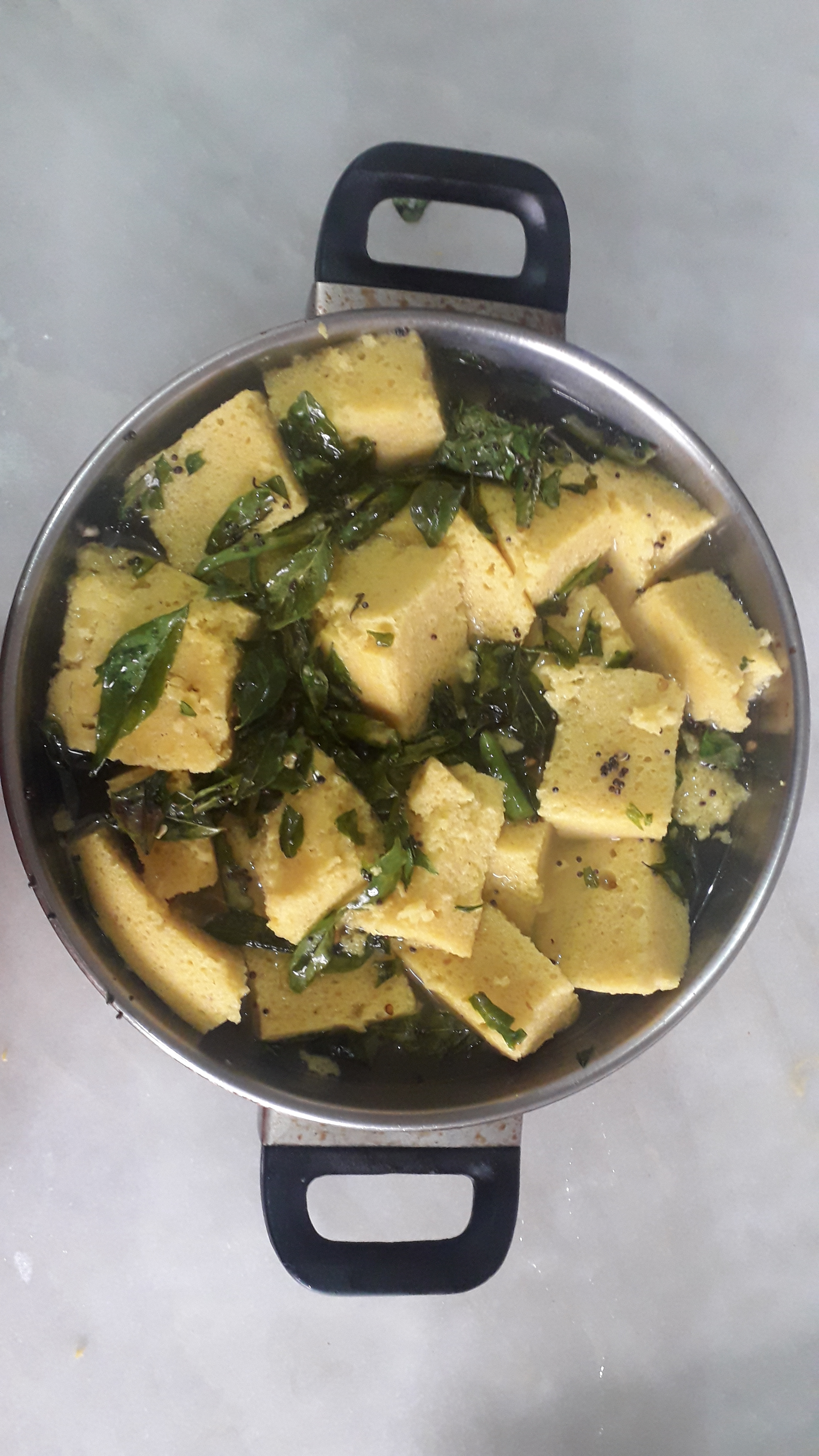
- Dhokla made in oven
  Sandwich dhokla
- Rava dhokla
- Mixed dal dhokla
- Green peas dhokla
- Meetha dhokla
- Besan dhokla

Khaman is similar but made from chickpea flour without rice. It is generally lighter in colour and softer than dhokla.

== Nutritional Value ==
Dhokla can be made oil-free and healthy, that is high in protein and low in calorie. Nutritionist Pooja Makhija said that "Dhoklas are prepared with little oil, the fermentation of the flour enhances its nutritive value, and it is steamed which is a plus". Chef Ajay Chopra shared "Fermented food is easier to digest as it improves the digestion, increases energy level, and aids in loss of excess weight.

== See also ==
- List of fermented foods
- List of steamed foods
- Khandvi
- Khaman
- Idli

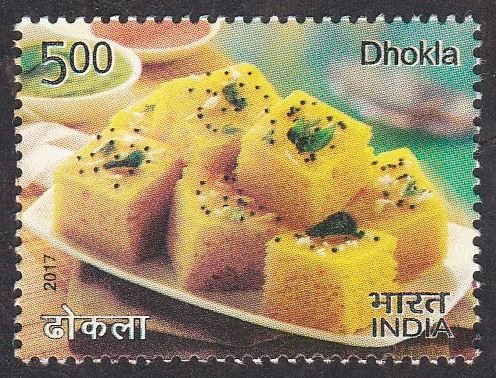
Dhokla depicted on 2017 stamp from India
