= Dhebra =

Indian bread from the Gujarati cuisine made of pearl millet flour

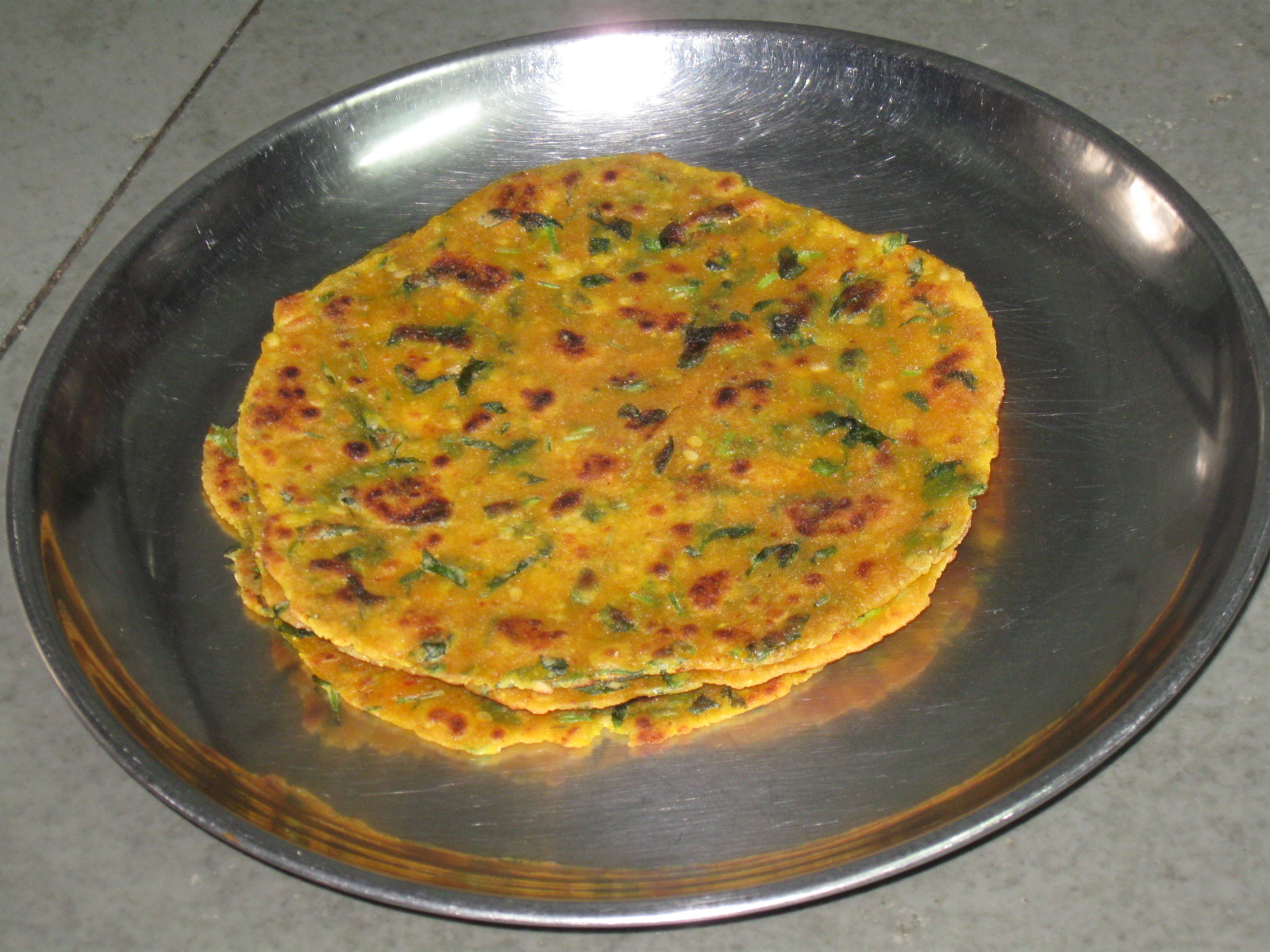
Methi Thepala

Dhebra (Gujarati: ઢેબરા) is an Indian bread from the Gujarati cuisine made of pearl millet flour. When flavoured with fenugreek leaves, it is called methi dhebra. It is a culinary cousin of the flatbread called thalipeeth in Marathi.

Dhebras can be eaten as a part of any meal - breakfast, brunch, lunch or dinner - or on their own as a snack. It is served hot or cold with pickle, curd or tea/coffee. Due to the oil in the recipe, Dhebras have a good shelf life.

== Preparation ==
To create dhebra, sufficient water and salt are mixed with millet flour and whole wheat flour to make a dough. The resulting dough balls are then flattened on a chakla to a round shape using a belan (rolling pin). Then, both sides of the dhebra are lightly fried with vegetable oil on a tava, until small brown spots appear.

This is a plain dhebra, made of millet flour (bajra atta). Because it is the simplest dhebra to make, it is the most commonly consumed in India. Another variety is the methi dhebra, in which methi (fenugreek leaves) are added as flavour. There is also dhebra made with bottle gourd called dudhi na dhebra.

Methi Dhebra can be made rotli sized or smaller (thicker) puri sized.

== Flavour ==
Fenugreek, Garlic, Guardian, Bottle Gourd, Cumin

== See also ==
- Gujarati cuisine
- Thalipeeth
