= Gram flour =

Pulse flour

chickpea flour
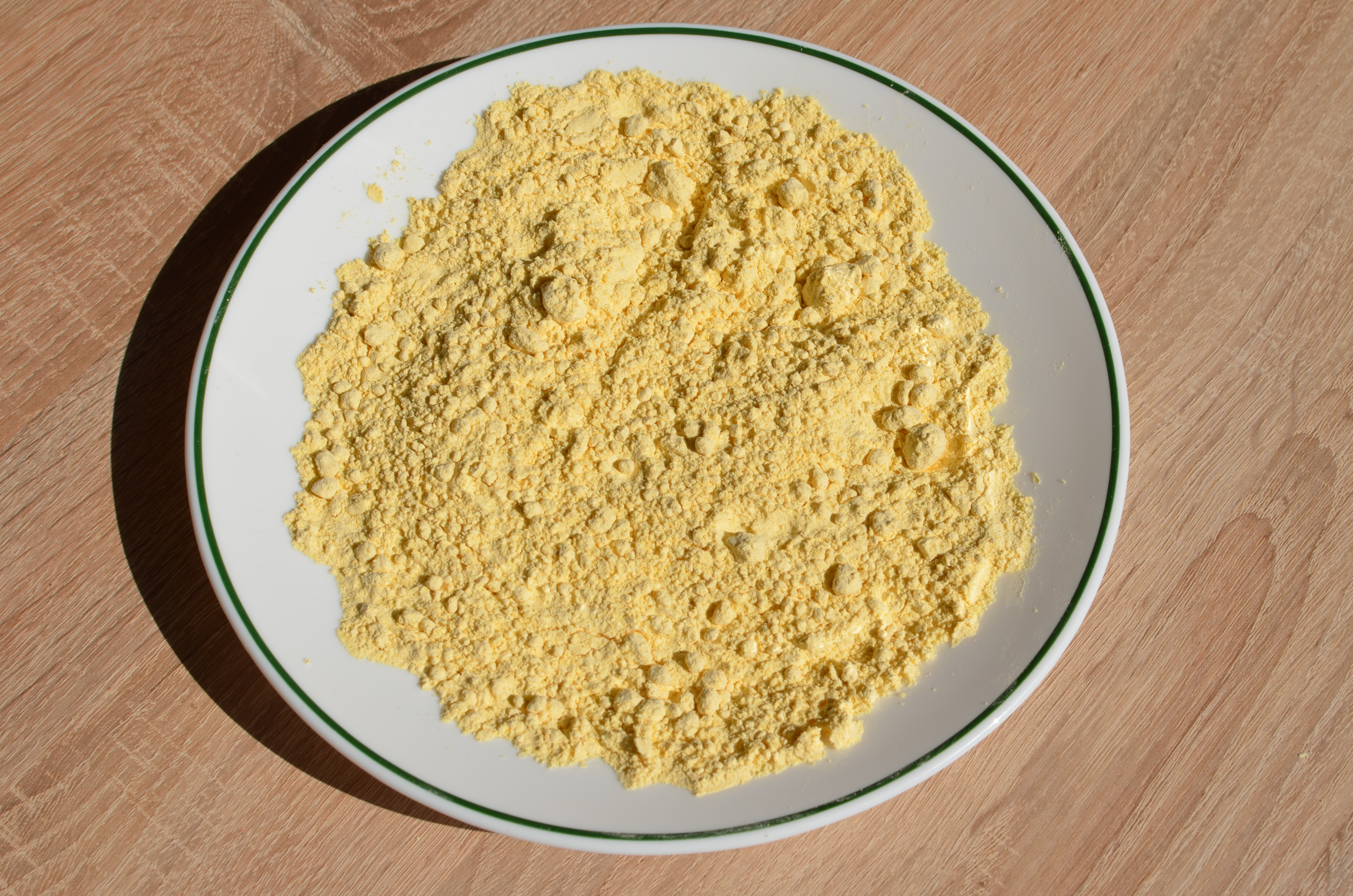

Nutritional value per 100 g (3.5 oz)
- Energy: 1,619 kJ (387 kcal)
- Carbohydrates: 57 g
- Sugars: 10 g
- Dietary fiber: 10 g
- Fat: 6 g
- Protein: 22 g
Vitamins and minerals
Vitamins	Quantity %DV^{†}
Niacin (B3)	6% 1 mg
Folate (B9)	109% 437 μg
Minerals	Quantity %DV^{†}
Calcium	3% 45 mg
Iron	22% 4 mg
Magnesium	40% 166 mg
Phosphorus	25% 318 mg
Potassium	28% 846 mg
Selenium	15% 8 μg
Sodium	3% 64 mg
Zinc	18% 2 mg
- Other constituents: Quantity
- Water: 10 g
- ^{†}Percentages estimated using US recommendations for adults, except for potassium, which is estimated based on expert recommendation from the National Academies.

Chickpea flour, common varieties include besan or gram flour, is a pulse flour made from chana dal or chickpea flour (split Bengal gram) or brown/kaala chana, a chickpea. It is a staple ingredient in cuisines of the Indian subcontinent, including Indian, Bangladeshi, Burmese, Nepali, Pakistani, and Sri Lankan cuisines. It is present in the closely related Caribbean cuisines, as well as in Lunigiana cuisines.

== Characteristics ==
Gram flour contains a high proportion of carbohydrates, higher fiber relative to other flours, no gluten, and a higher proportion of protein than other flours.

== Dishes ==
=== Indian subcontinent and the Caribbean ===
Gram flour is in popular use in the Indian subcontinent and the Caribbean, where it is used to make the following:

- A variety of snacks
- Sev
- Bhajjis
- Bikaneri bhujia
- Bonda
- Boondi
- Chakki
- Chakli
- Chila/dhirda (besan dosa)
- Dhokla/khaman
- Kadhi
- Zunka/pithala/pithla
- Laddu
- Soan papdi
- Mysore pak
- Pakoras
- Papadums
- Patra
- Pholourie

In Andhra Pradesh, it is used in a curry with gram flour cakes called senaga pindi kura (Telugu: శెనగ పిండి కూర) and is eaten with chapati or puri, mostly during winter for breakfast. Chila (or chilla), a pancake made with gram flour batter, is a popular street food in India.

=== Southeast and East Asia ===
Gram flour is commonly used in Burmese cuisine. Roasted gram flour is commonly added to season Burmese salads, and is the principal ingredient of Burmese tofu. Roasted gram flour is also used to thicken several noodle soup dishes, including mohinga and ohn no khao swè.

Gram flour is used to make jidou liangfen, a Yunnanese dish similar to Burmese tofu salad.

=== Southern Europe ===
Along the coast of the Ligurian Sea, flour made from garbanzo beans, which are a different variety of chickpea closely related to Bengal gram, is used to make a thin pancake that is baked in the oven. This popular street food is called farinata in Italian cuisine, fainâ in Genoa, calda in Carrara, and is known as socca or cade in French cuisine. It is used to make panelle, a fritter in Sicilian cuisine, and panisses, a similar fritter from France. In Spanish cuisine, gram flour is an ingredient for tortillitas de camarones. Also in Cyprus and Greece, it is used as a garnishing ingredient for the funeral ritual food koliva, blessed and eaten during Orthodox memorial services. In the cuisine of Antakya in Turkey, it is used in the preparation of hummus.

=== North Africa ===
In Algeria and East Morocco, they make a dish called karantika from unroasted chickpea flour, which is topped with beaten egg and baked in the oven. The dish is also called garantita or karantita (originated from the Spanish term calentica, which means 'hot').

== See also ==
- Kinako
- List of chickpea dishes
- Oralu kallu, a type of grinding machine using stone to produce flour in some parts of India
