= Maharashtrian cuisine =

Cuisine of the Marathi people from Maharashtra, India

Maharashtrian or Marathi cuisine is the cuisine of the Marathi people from the Indian state of Maharashtra. It has distinctive attributes, while sharing much with other Indian cuisines. Traditionally, Maharashtrians have considered their food to be more austere than others.

Maharashtrian cuisine includes mild and spicy dishes. Wheat, rice, jowar, bajri, vegetables, lentils and fruit are dietary staples. Peanuts and cashews are often served with vegetables. Meat was traditionally used sparsely or only by the well-off until recently, because of economic conditions and culture.

The urban population in metropolitan cities of the state has been influenced by cuisine from other parts of India and abroad. For example, the South Indian dishes idli and dosa, as well as Chinese and Western dishes such as pizza, are popular in home cooking and in restaurants.

Distinctly Maharashtrian dishes include ukdiche modak, aluchi patal bhaji, kanda pohe and thalipeeth.

== Regular meals and staple dishes ==
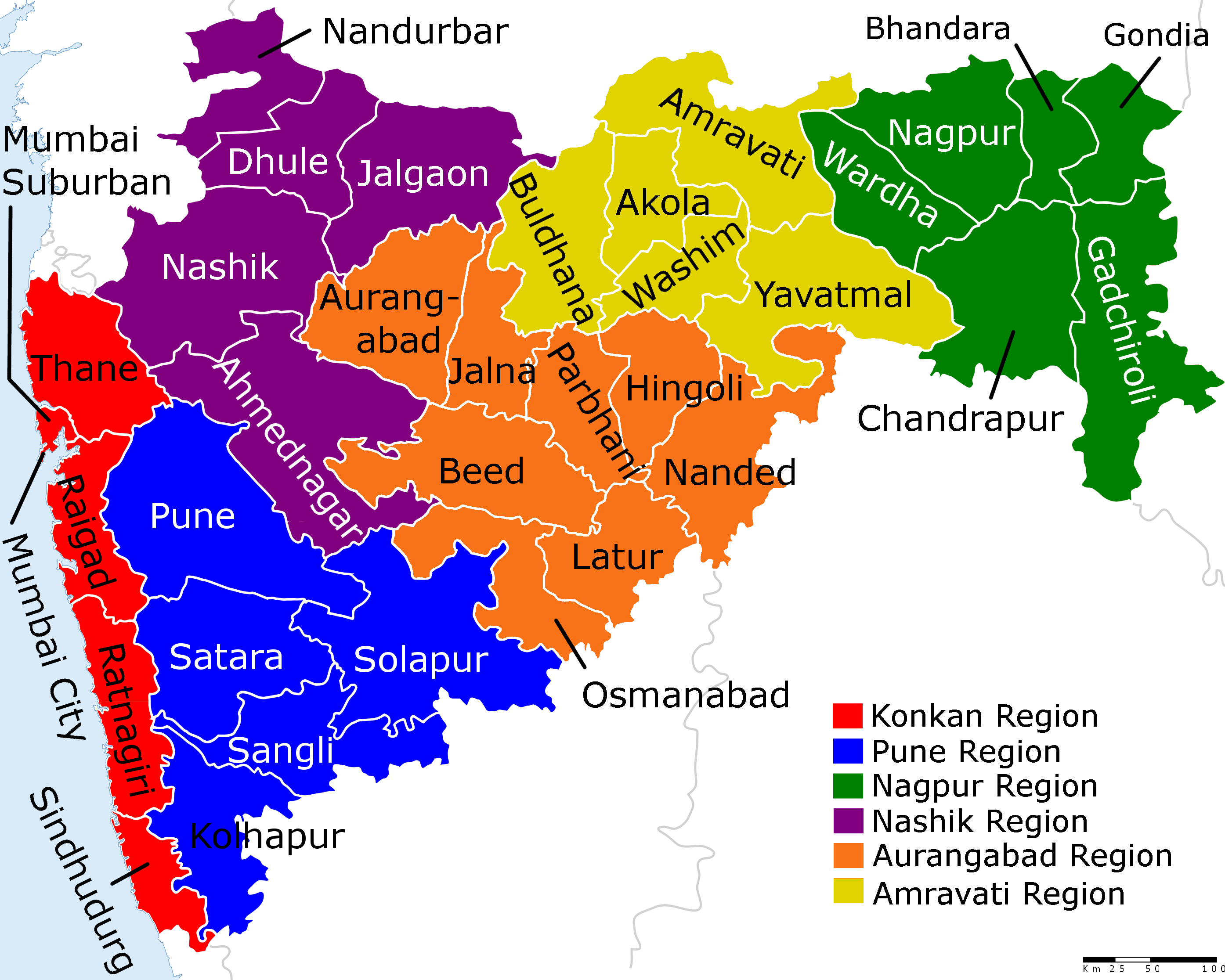
Regions and districts of Maharashtra

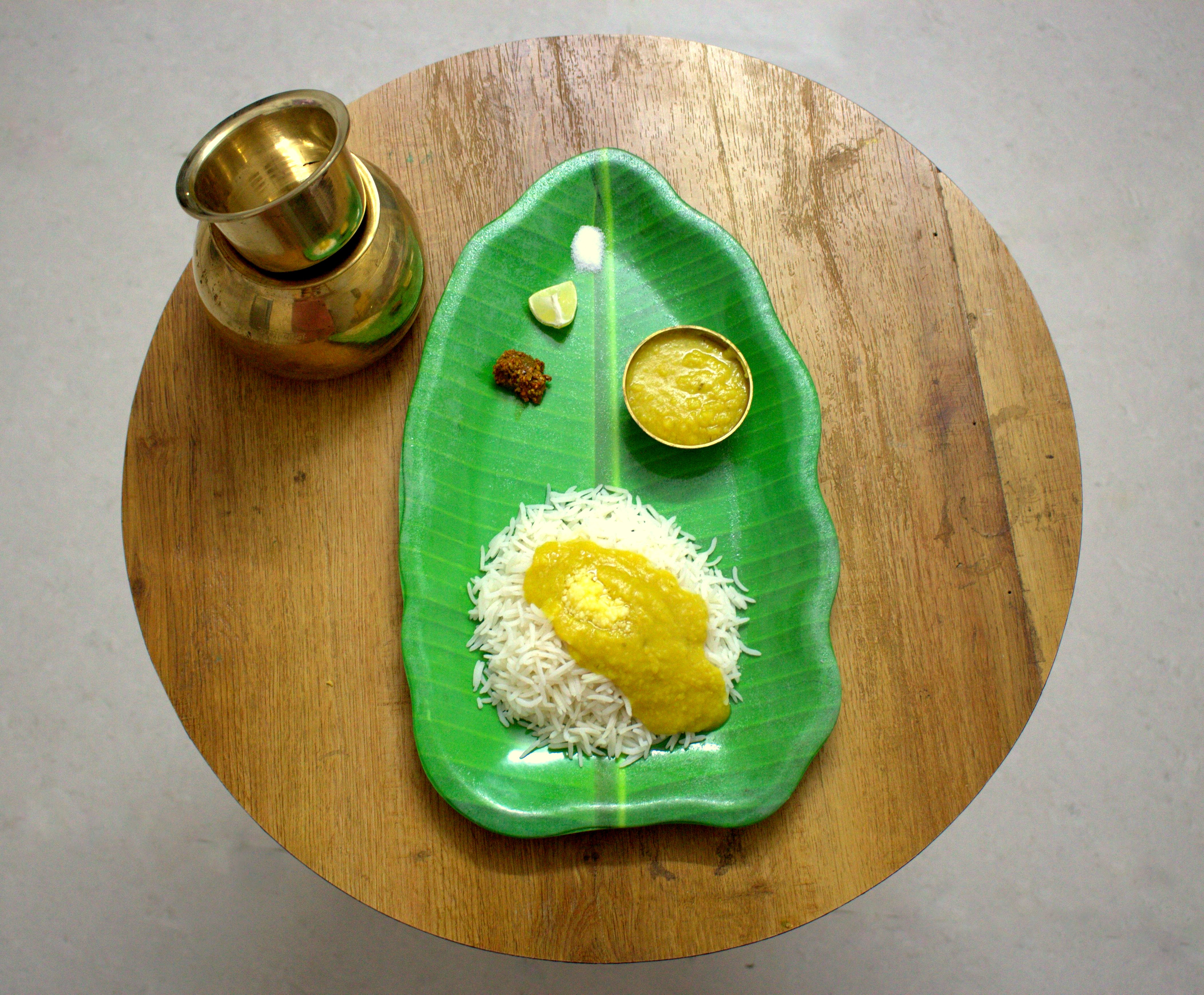
Varan bhat in Maharashtrian house

Maharashtrian lacto-vegetarian dishes are based on five main classes of ingredients that include grains, legumes, vegetables, dairy products and spices.

=== Grains ===
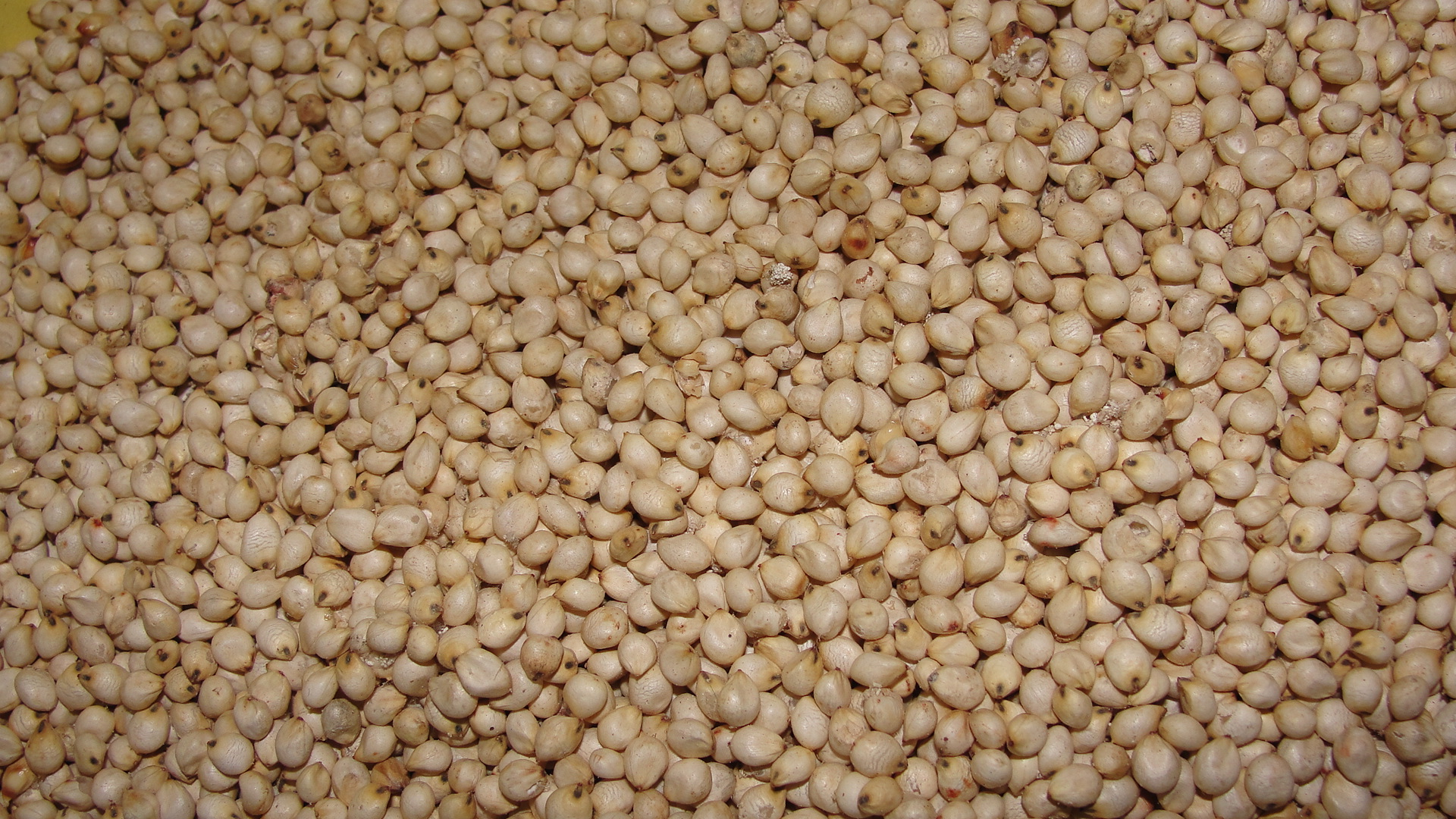
Grains of jwari (Sorghum bicolor)

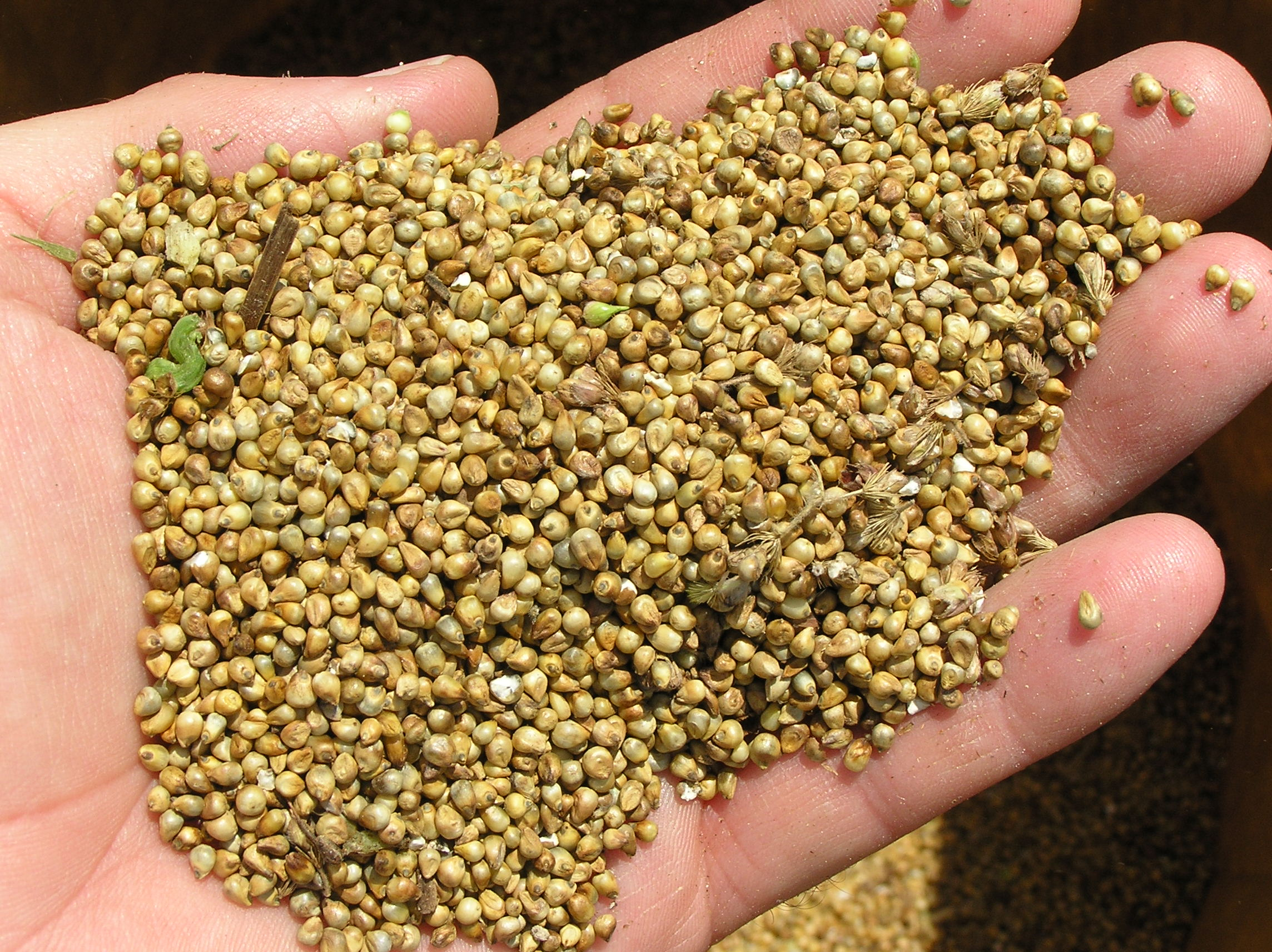
Grains of bajri (pearl millet)

Staple dishes in the cuisine are based on a variety of flatbreads and rice. Flatbreads can be wheat-based, such as the traditional trigonal ghadichi poli or the round chapati that is more common in urban areas. Bhakri is an unleavened bread made using grains such as ragi or millet, bajra or bajri or jwari and forms part of daily meals in rural areas.

==== Millets ====
Traditionally, the staple grains of the inland Deccan Plateau have been millets, jwari and bajri. These crops grow well in this dry and drought-prone region. In the coastal Konkan region the finger millet called ragi is used for bhakri. The staple meal of the rural poor was traditionally as simple as bajra bhakri accompanied by just a raw onion, a dry chutney, or a gram flour preparation called jhunka. Although in recent years consumption of millets has gone down, in central regions of Maharashtra it still accounts for 48% of cereal consumption per capita. Jhunka with bhakri has now become a popular street food in Maharashtra.

==== Wheat ====
Increased urbanization of the Maharashtra region has increased wheat's popularity. Wheat is used for making flatbreads called chapati, trigonal ghadichi poli, the deep-fried version called puri or the thick paratha. Wheat is also used in many stuffed flatbreads such as the puran poli, gul poli (with sesame and jaggery stuffing),

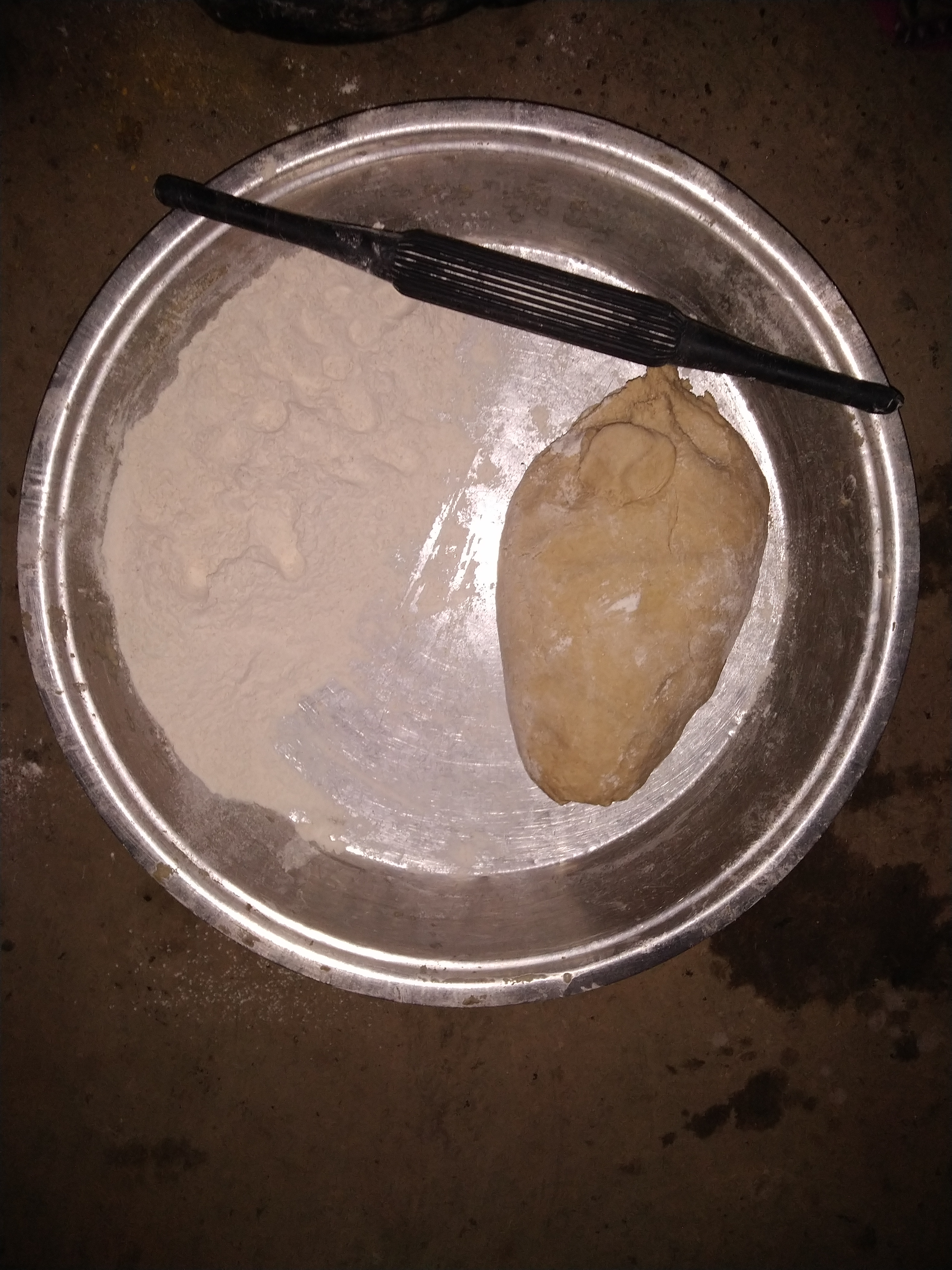
Wheat dough in Maharashtrian house

Wheat flatbreads are also made with vegetable stuffings such as peas, potatoes and gram dal. One of the ancient sought-after breads was mande.

==== Rice ====
Rice is the staple food in the rural areas of coastal Konkan region but is also popular in all urban areas. Local varieties such as the fragrant ambemohar have been popular in Western Maharashtra. In most instances, rice is boiled on its own and becomes part of a meal that includes other items. A popular dish is varan bhaat, in which steamed rice is mixed with plain dal that is prepared with pigeon peas, lemon juice, salt and ghee. Khichdi is a popular rice dish made with rice, mung dal and spices. For special occasions, a dish called masalebhat made with rice, spices and vegetables is popular.

=== Dairy ===
Milk is important as a staple food. Both cow milk and water buffalo milk are popular. Milk is used mainly for drinking, to add to tea or coffee or to make homemade dahi (yogurt). Traditionally, yogurt is made every day using previous day's yogurt as the starting bacterial culture to ferment the milk. The Dahi is used as dressing for many salad or koshimbir dishes, to prepare Kadhi, to prepare cultured buttermilk (Taak) or as a side dish in a thali. Buttermilk is used in a drink called mattha by mixing it with spices. It may also be used in curry preparations.

=== Vegetables ===
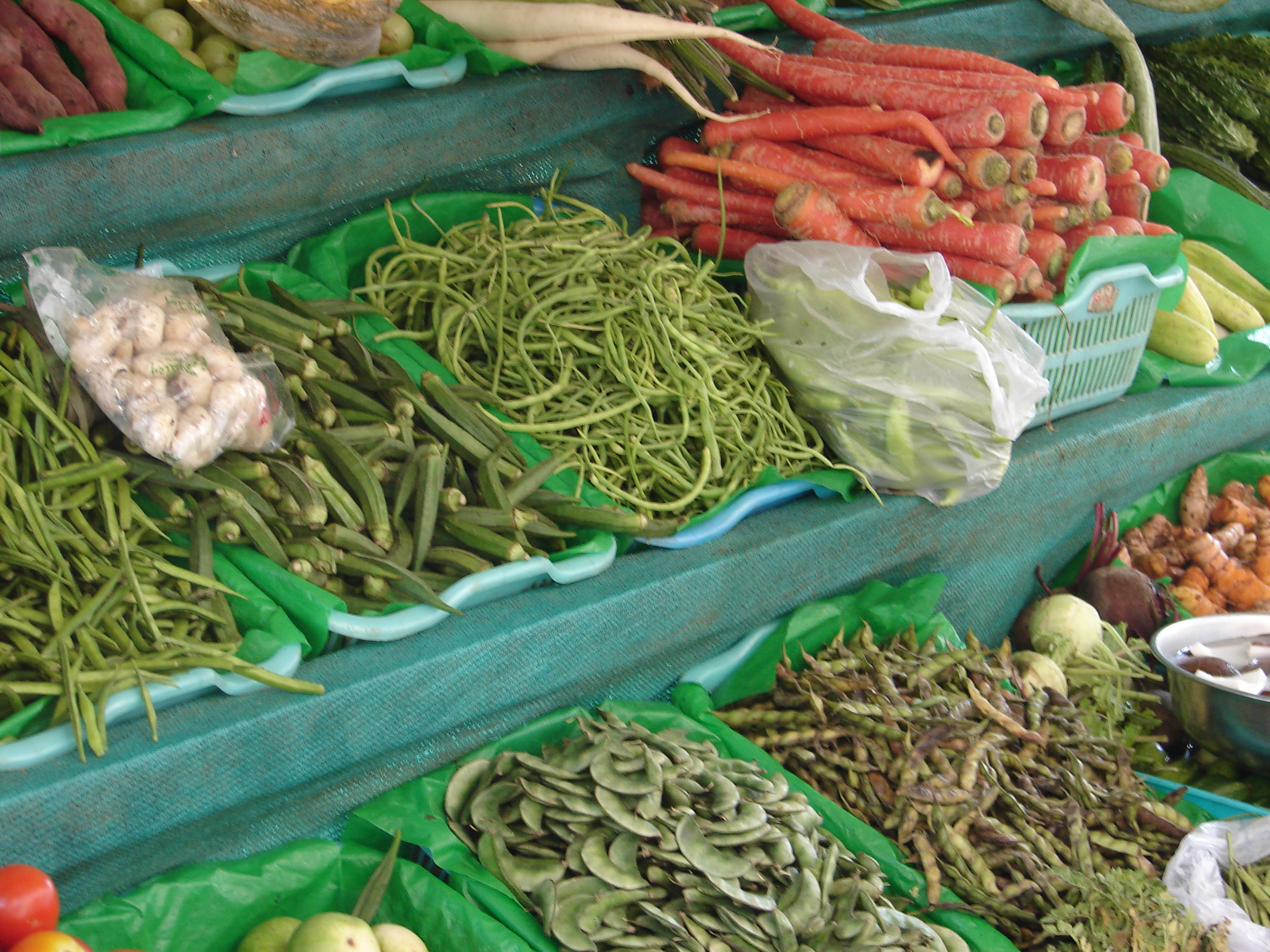
Common vegetables used as seen on a market cart in Pune. Top row from left, Sweet potatoes, Awala, winter radish:Middle row from left Guar pods, Bhendi, carrots far right; bottom row, pavta

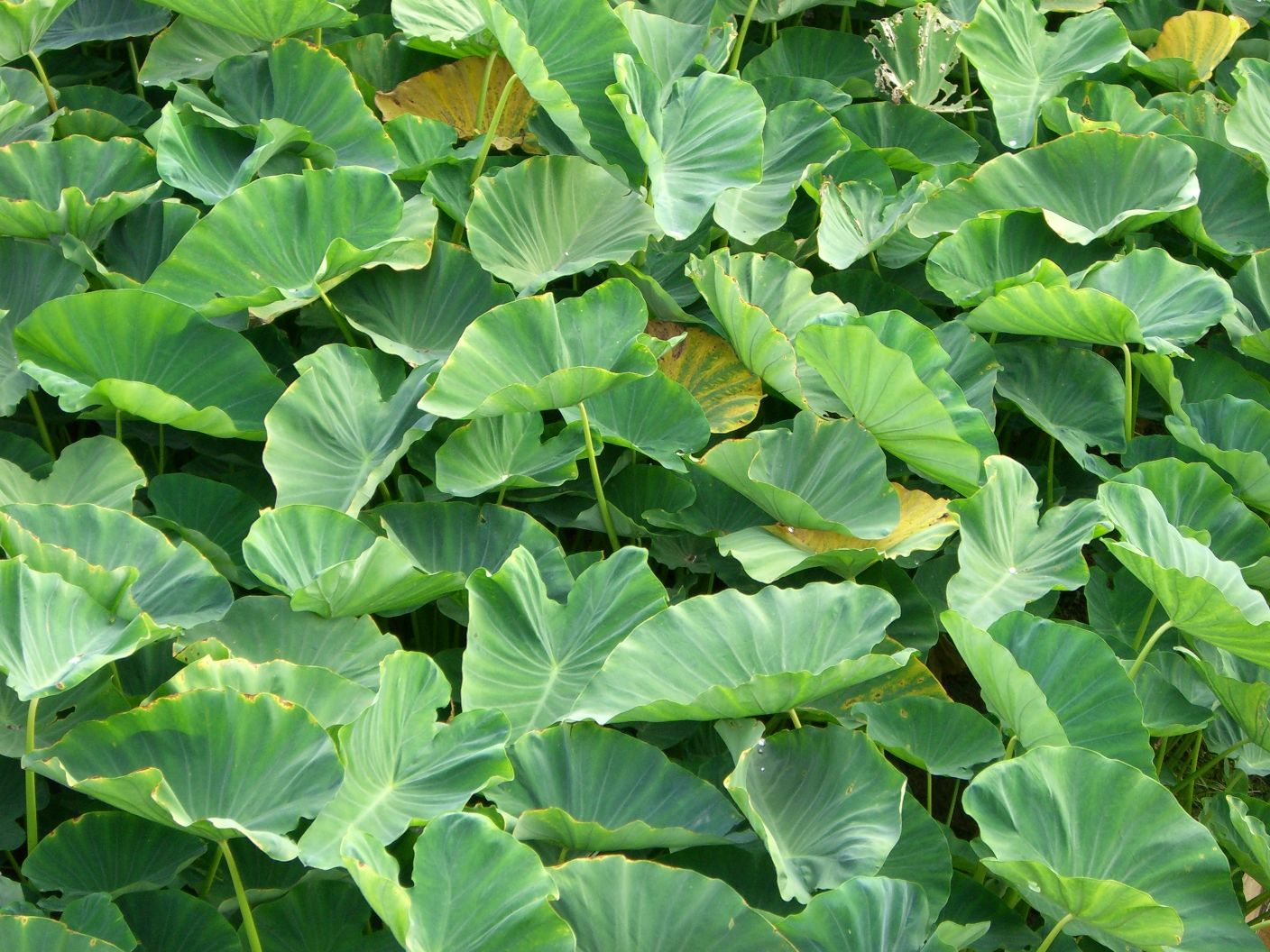
Aḷū(अळू), a popular leafy vegetable

Until recently, canned or frozen food was not widely available in India. Therefore, the vegetables used in a meal widely depended on seasonal availability. In Maharashtra, spring (March–May) is the season of cabbages, onions, potatoes, bhēṇḍī, guar and tondaḷi, śēvgyācyā śēṅgā, dudhi, marrow and padwal. During the Monsoon season (June–September) green leafy vegetables, such as aḷū (Marathi: अळू), or gourds such as karle, dodka and eggplant become available. Chili peppers, carrots, tomatoes, cauliflower, French beans, śēpu, and peas become available in the cooler climate of October to February. Coal fired roasted young cobs of Sorghum (Jvārī) is a popular item during winter picnics to the farms. Vegetables are typically used in making bhājīs (Indian stew). Some bhājīs are made with a single vegetable, while others are made with a combination. Bhājīs can be "dry" as in stir fry or "wet" as in the well-known curry. For example, fenugreek leaves can be used with mūg ḍāḷ or potatoes to make a dry bhājī or mixed with bēsan flour and buttermilk to make a curry preparation. Marathi bhājīs typically use gōḍa masālā, consisting of a combination of cloves, corriander powder, cumin, cinnamon, asafoetida, etc. and kanda-lasun masala made up of onion, garlic, ginger, red chilli powder, green chillies, turmeric and mustard seeds. Depending on a family's caste or specific religious tradition, onions and garlic may be excluded. For example, a number of Hindu communities from many parts of India refrain from eating onions and garlic altogether during chaturmas, which broadly equals the monsoon season.

Leafy vegetables such as fenugreek, amaranth, beetroot, radish, dill, colocasia, spinach, ambadi, sorrel (Chuka in Marathi), chakwat, safflower (Kardai in Marathi) and tandulja are either stir-fried (pale bhaaji) or made into a soup (patal bhaaji) using buttermilk and gram flour.

Many vegetables are used in salad preparations called koshimbirs or raita. Most of these have dahi (yogurt) as the other main ingredient. Popular Koshimbirs include those based on radish, cucumber and tomato-onion combinations.

=== Legumes ===
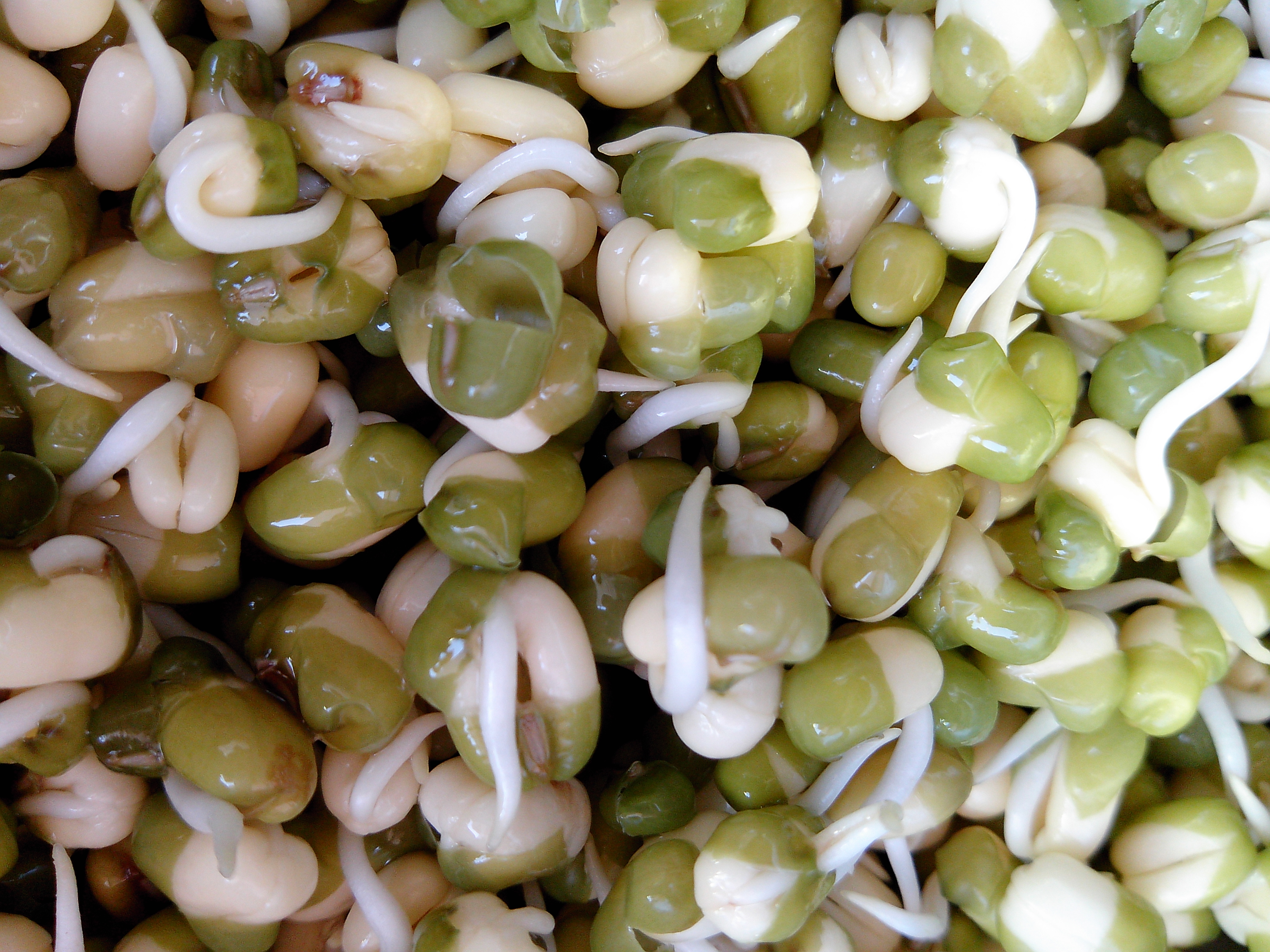
Sprouted mung beans

Along with green vegetables, another class of popular food is various beans, either whole or split. Split beans are called dal and turned into amti (thin lentil soup), or added to vegetables such as dudhi. Dal may be cooked with rice to make khichadi. Whole beans are cooked as is or more popularly soaked in water until sprouted. Unlike Chinese cuisine, the beans are allowed to grow for only a day or two. Curries made out of sprouted beans are called usal and form an important source of proteins. The legumes popular in Maharastrian cuisine include peas, chick peas, mung, matki, urid, kidney bean, black-eyed peas, kulith and toor (also called pigeon peas). Out of the above toor and chick peas are staples. The urid bean is the base for one of the most popular types of papadum'.

=== Oils and fats ===
Peanut oil and sunflower oil are the preferred cooking oils; however,other seed oils such as Safflower oil, and cottonseed oil are also used.

=== Spices and herbs ===
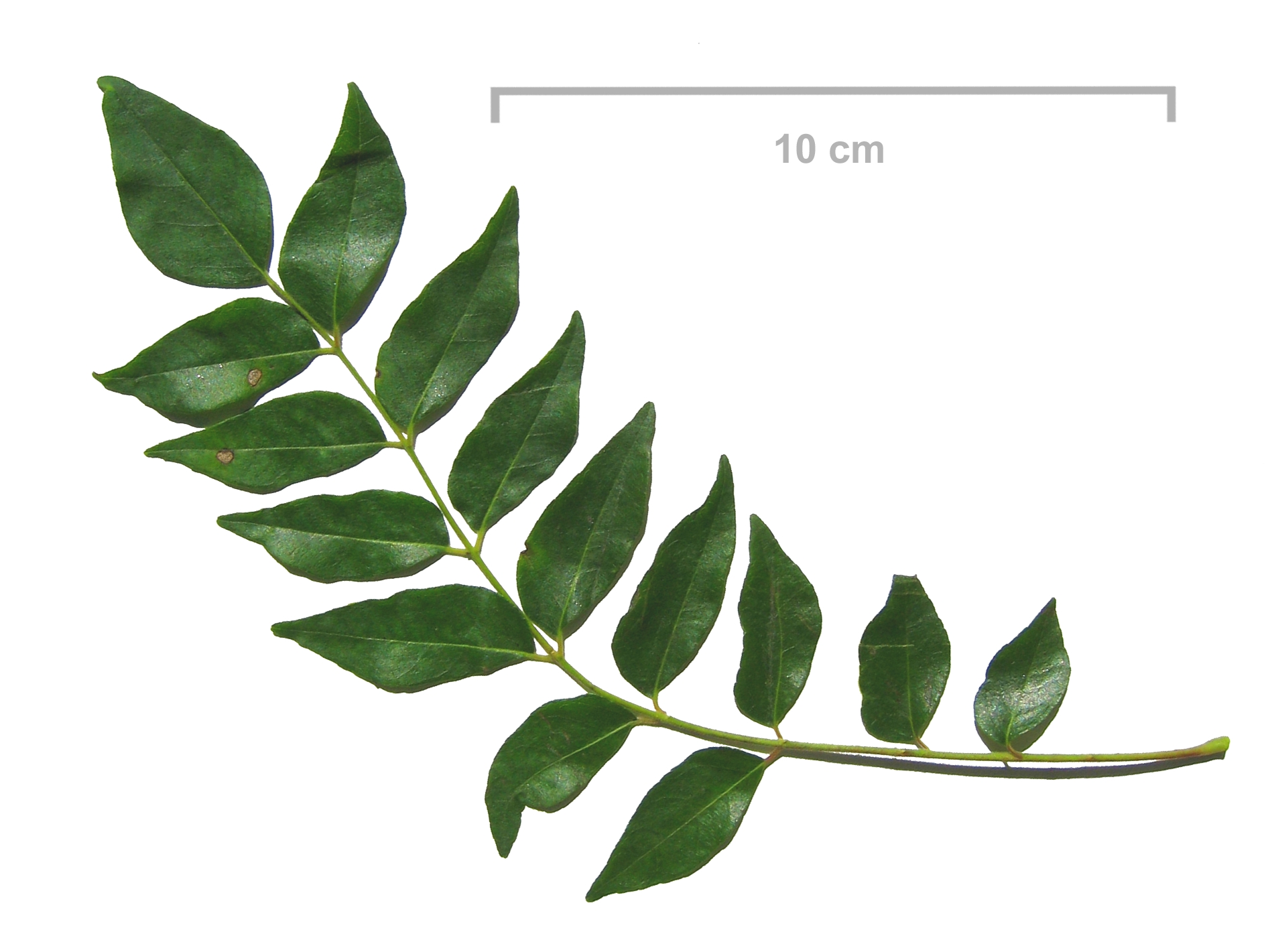
Curry leaves are popular for garnishing many dishes

Depending on region, religion and caste, Maharashtrian food can be mild to extremely spicy. Common spices include asafoetida, turmeric, mustard seeds, coriander, cumin, dried bay leaves, and chili powder. Ingredients used especially for kala or black masala spice blend include cinnamon, cloves, black pepper, cardamom and nutmeg. Other spice blends popular in the cuisine include goda masala and Kolhapuri masala. Common herbs to impart flavor or to garnish a dish include curry leaves and coriander leaves. Many common curry recipes call for garlic, onion, ginger and green chilli pepper. Ingredients that impart sour flavor to the food include yoghurt, tomatoes, tamarind paste, lemon, and amsul skin. or unripe mangoes.

=== Meat and poultry ===
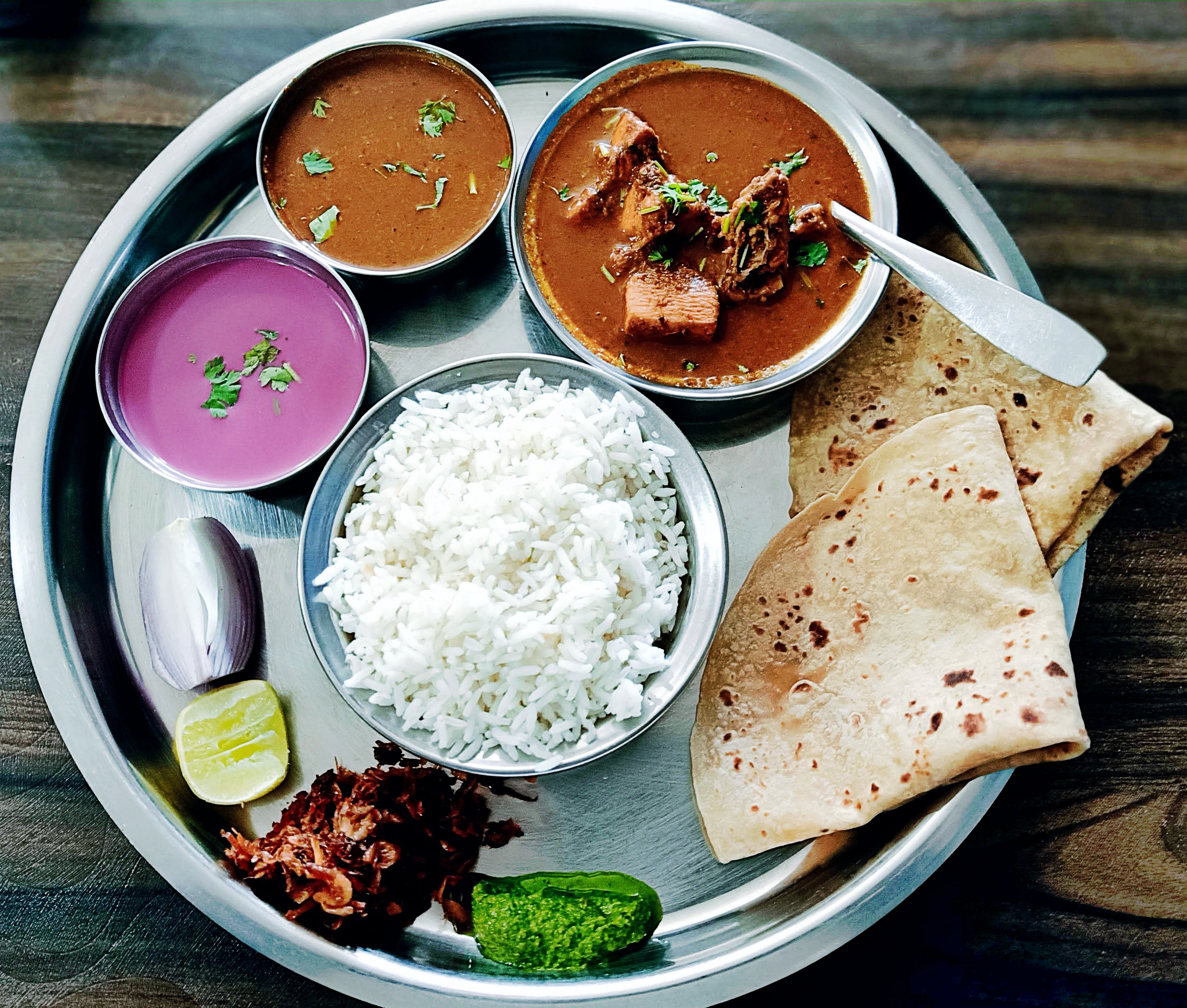
Maharashtrian non-vegetarian thaali

Chicken and goat are the most popular sources for meat in Maharashtrian cuisine. Eggs are popular and exclusively come from chicken sources. Beef and pork are also consumed by some sections of Maharashtrian society.

=== Seafood ===
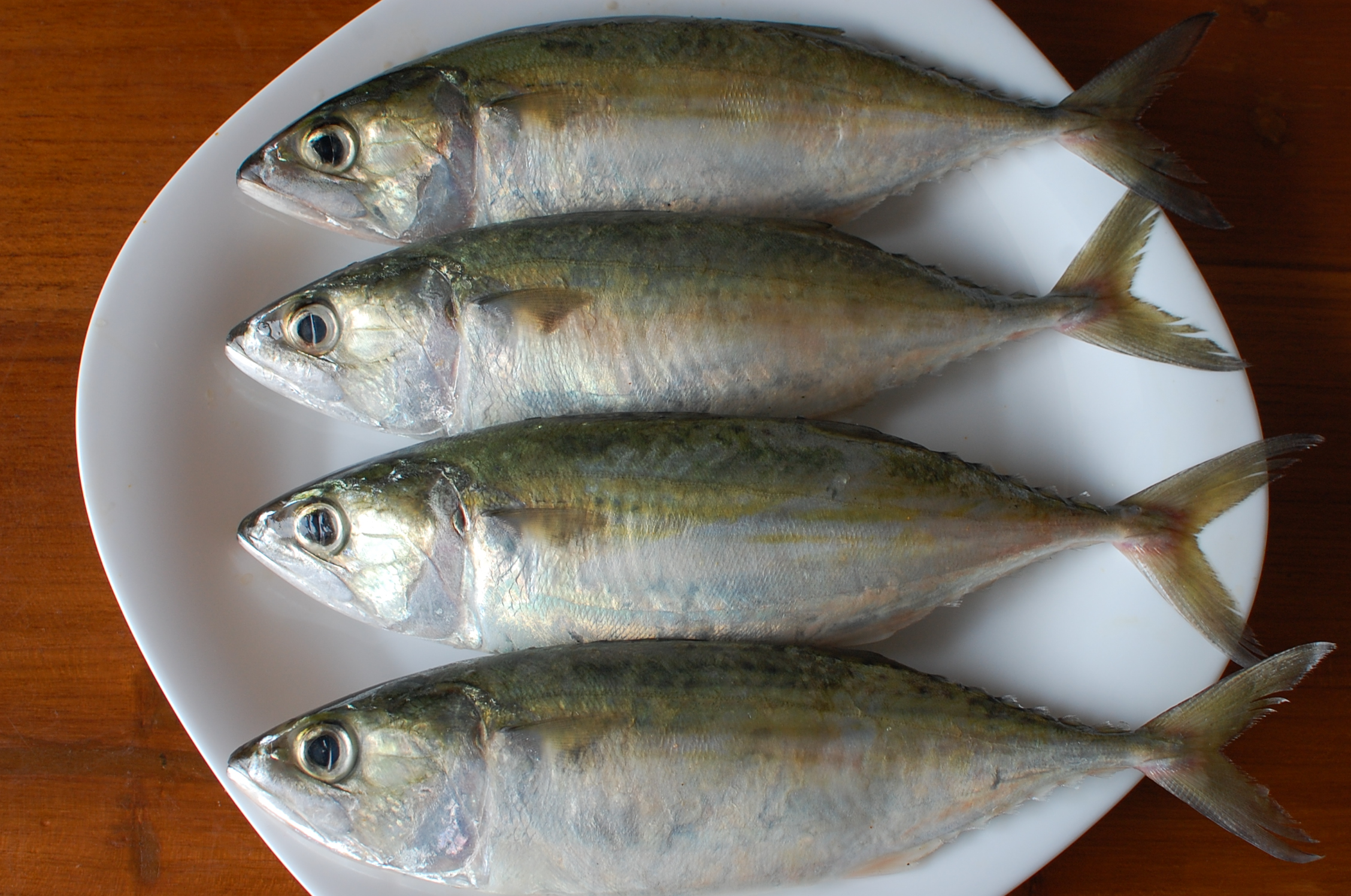
Bangda or Indian mackerel

Seafood is a staple for many Konkan coastal communities and is popular in other parts of the state too. Most of the recipes are based on marine fish, prawns and crab. A distinct Malvani cuisine of mainly seafood dishes is popular. Popular fish varieties include Bombay duck, pomfret, bangda, Rawas, and surmai (kingfish).These fish are used fresh as well as dried in areas around Mumbai. Seafood recipes are prepared in different ways such as curried, Pan frying, or steaming in banana leaves.

=== Miscellaneous ingredients ===
Other ingredients include oil seeds such as flax, karale, coconut, peanuts, almonds and cashew nuts. Peanut powder and whole nuts are used in many preparations including, chutney, koshimbir and bhaaji. More expensive nuts such as (almonds and cashew) are used mainly for sweet dishes. Flax and karale seeds are used in making dry chutneys.

=== Typical menus ===
Urban menus typically have wheat in the form of chapatis and plain rice as the main staples. Traditional rural households would have millet in form of bhakri on the Deccan plains and rice on the coast as respective staples.

==== Contemporary lunch and dinner menus ====
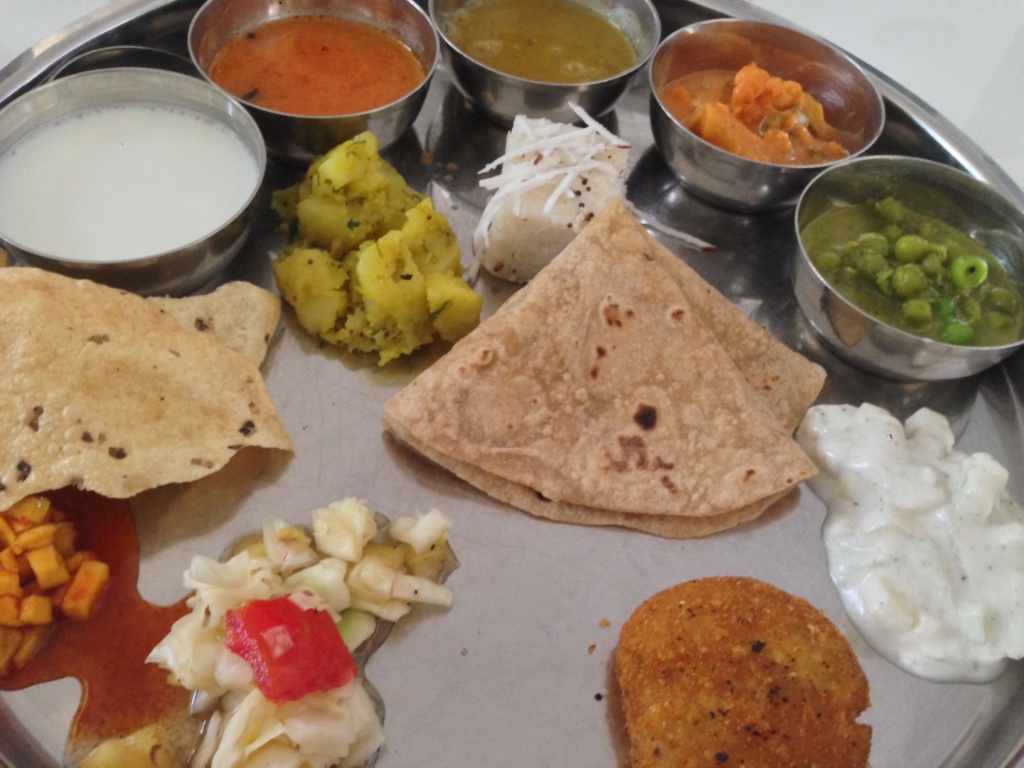
A Maharashtrian vegetarian meal with a variety of items

Traditional dinner items are arranged in a circular way. With salt placed at 12 o'clock, pickles, koshimbir and condiments are placed anti-clockwise of the salt. Vegetable preparations are arranged in a clockwise fashion with a sequence of leafy greens curry, dry vegetables, sprouted been curry (usal) and dal. Rice is always on the periphery rather than in the center.

==== Traditional lunch and dinner menus ====
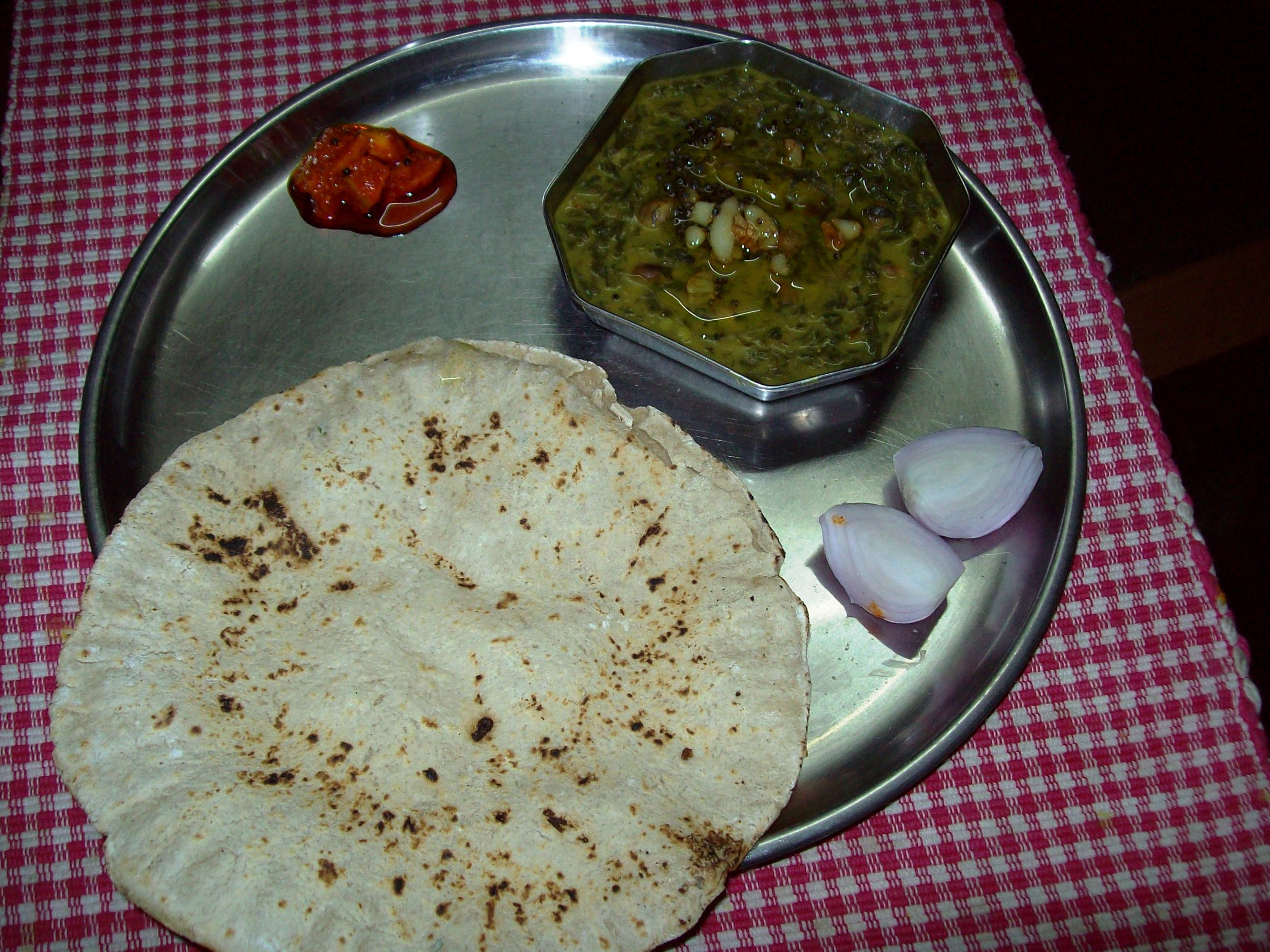
A typical simple Maharashtrian meal with bhaaji, bhakari, raw onion and pickle

In the inland areas of Maharashtra such as Desh, Khandesh, Marathwada and Vidarbha, the traditional staple was bhakri with a combination of dal, vegetables, or commonly the chickpea flour based pithale. The bhakri is increasingly replaced by wheat-based chapatis.

== Methods and equipment ==
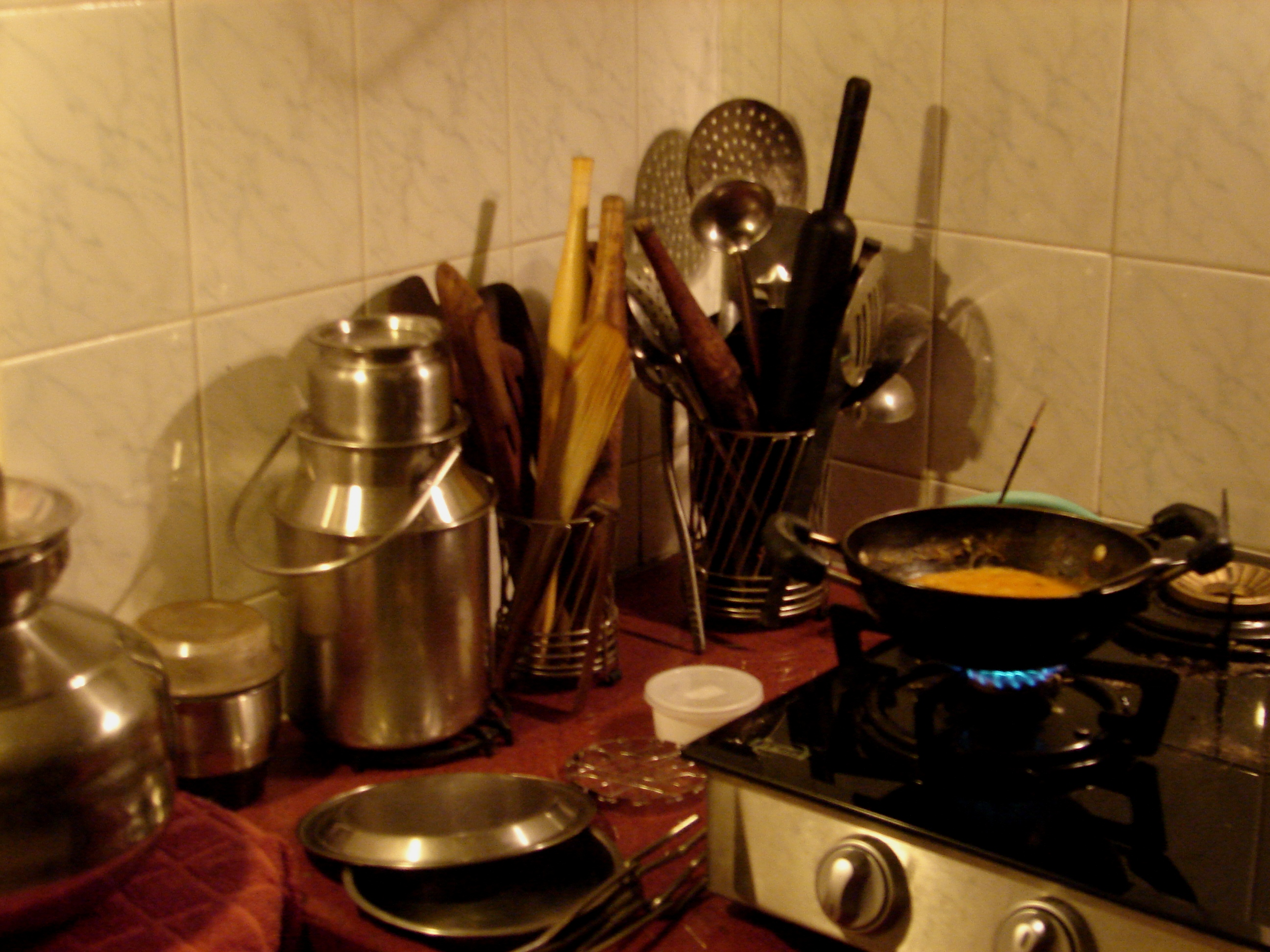
Maharashtrian kitchen

Open stove cooking is the most commonly used cooking method. The traditional three-stone chulha has largely been replaced by kerosene or gas stoves. A stove may be used for cooking in many different ways:

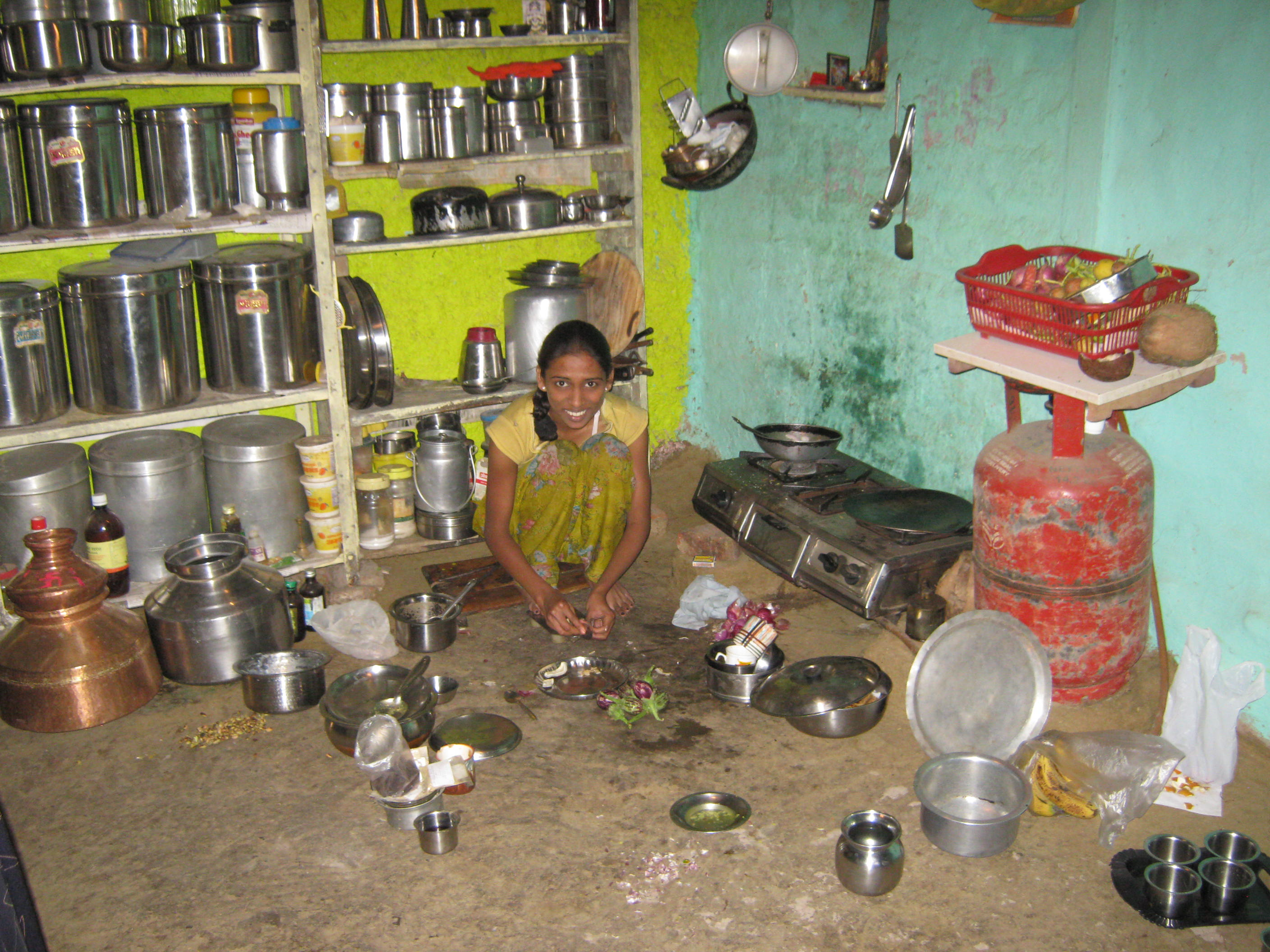
A Maharashtrian kitchen in rural part of Maharashtra in 2011

- Phodani – Often translated as "tempering", is a cooking technique and garnish where spices such as mustard seeds, cumin seeds, turmeric, and sometimes other ingredients such as minced ginger and garlic are fried briefly in oil or ghee to liberate essential oils from cells and thus enhance their flavours. Other ingredients such as vegetables and meat are then added to the pan. Phodani may be the first step in making a bhaaji, aamti or curry. It may also be the last step, as part of a garnish.
- Simmering – Most curries and bhaajis are simmered for the meat or vegetables to cook
- Deep frying – This is used for making fritters such as onion bhaji, or sweet fried dumplings (karanji)
- Pan frying – This is characterized by the use of minimal cooking oil or fat (compared to shallow frying or deep frying); typically using just enough oil to lubricate the pan. This method is used for cooking delicate items such as fish.
- Tawa – This is usually a concave metal pan used on an open stove for making unleavened flatbreads such as ghadichi poli, chapatis or bhakris.
- Steaming – This method is mainly used for specialties such as ukadiche modak, or aluchya wadya.
- Roasting – Vangyache bharit involves roasting eggplant over open fire prior to mashing and adding other ingredients.
- Pressure cooking – This technique is used extensively for shortening the cooking time for lentils, meat and rice.

Other methods of food preparation include:

- Baking – Baking is seldom used at home. The bread buns or pav used in popular street foods such as vadapav are baked by commercial bakers.
- Sun drying – Papad, a popular snack, and related products called papdya and kurdaya, are dried in the sun after rolling out. The dried products keep for many months.
- Fermentation – This is used mainly for making dahi (yogurt) or home-made butter from cream-enriched milk.,

== Special dishes ==
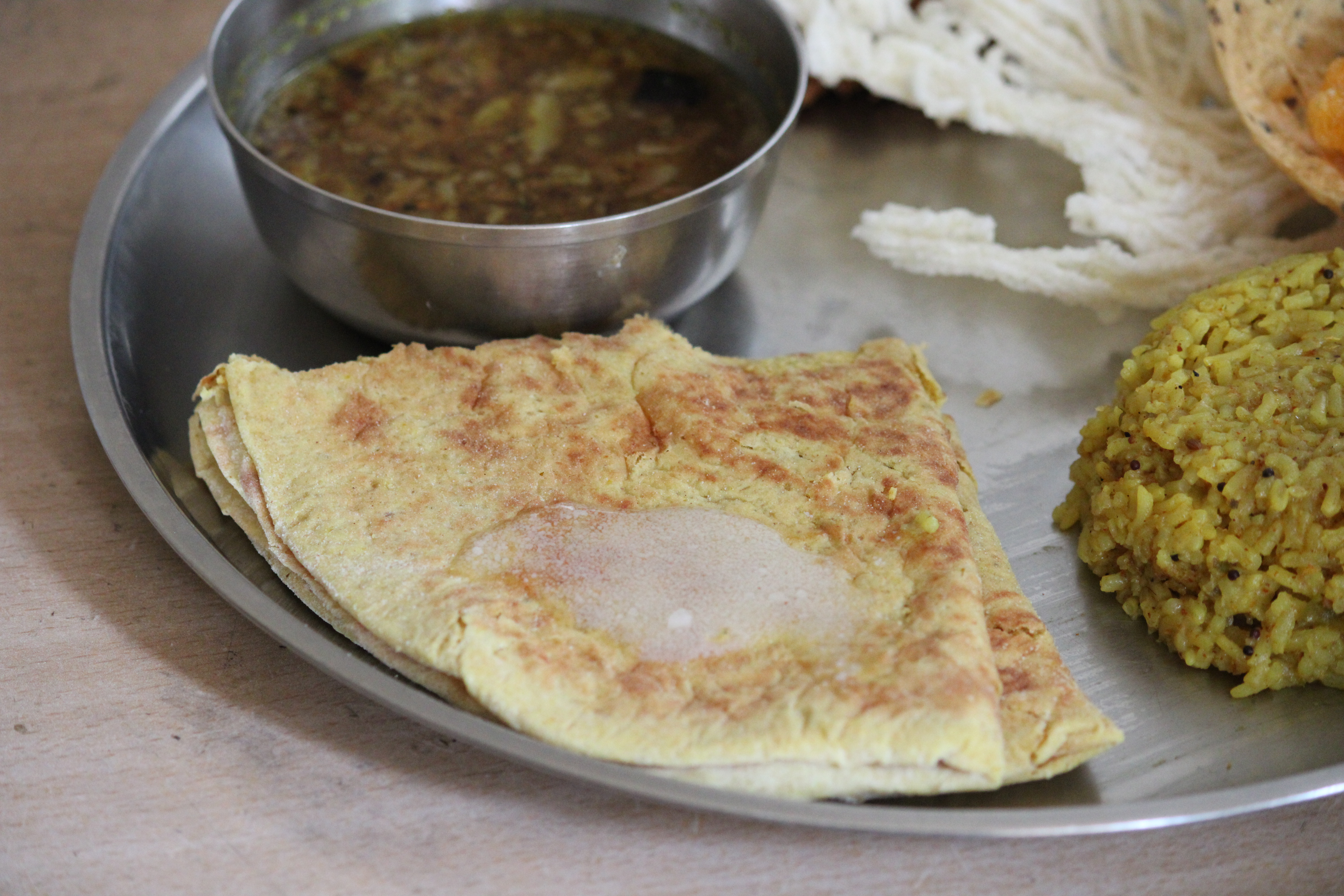
Puran poli

A number of dishes are made for religious occasions, dinner parties or as restaurant items or street food.

=== Meat and poultry ===
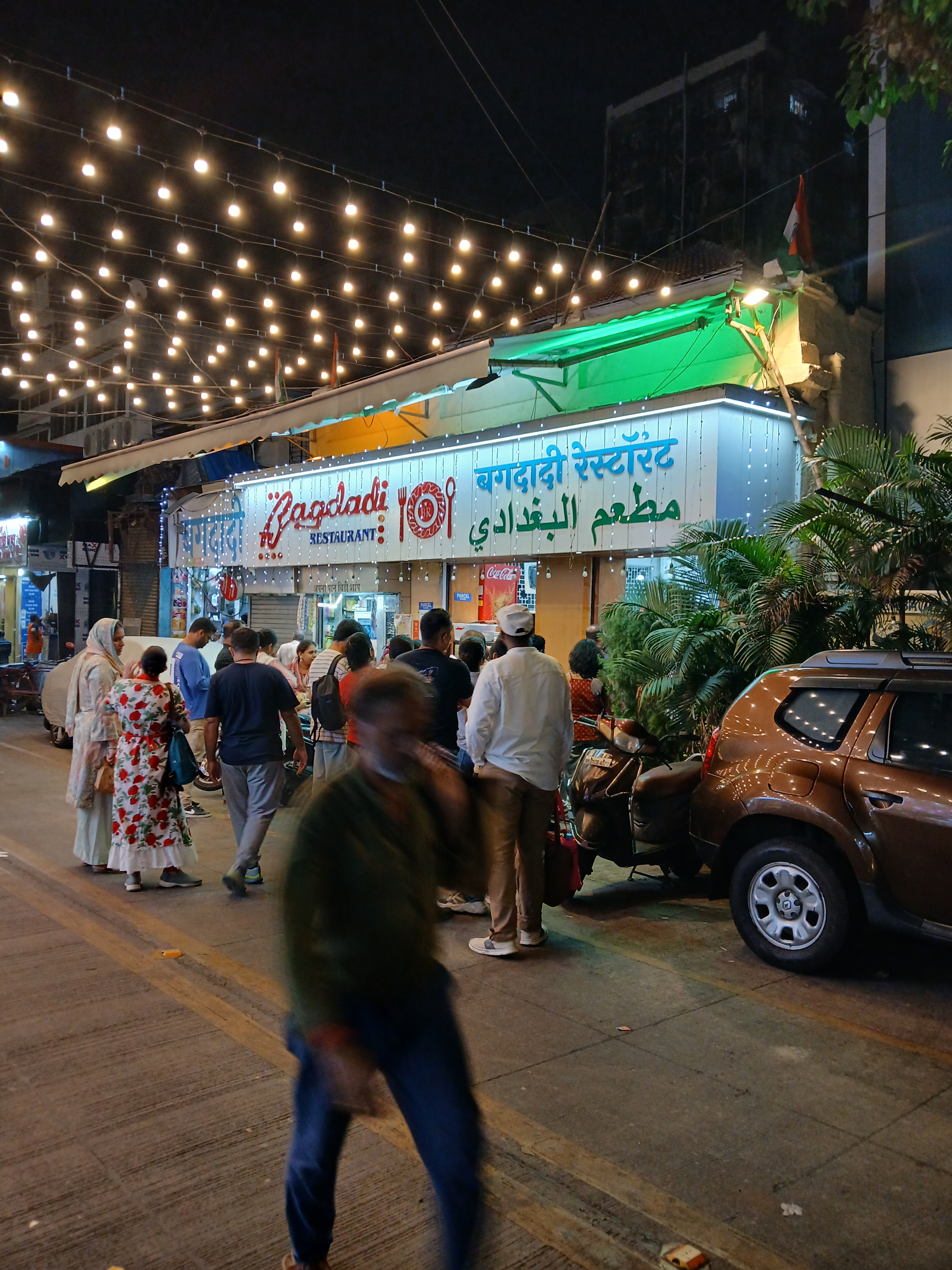
Bagdadi Restaurant, Colaba

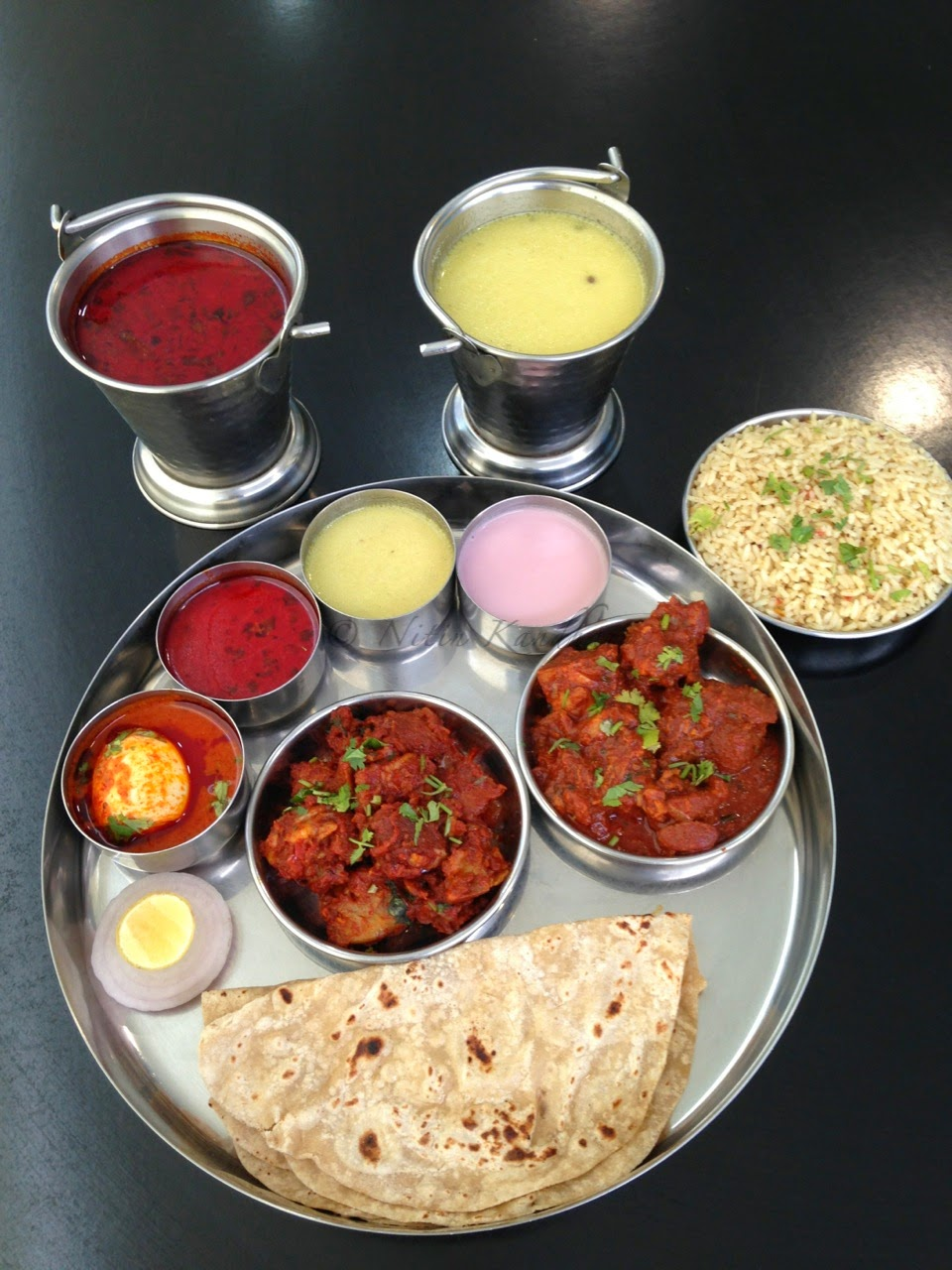
A Thali from Kolhapur, Maharashtra with red (tambda rassa) and white (pandhara rass) gravies to be served with meat

Meat dishes are prepared in a variety of ways:

- Taambda rassa is a hot spicy curry with red gravy from Kolhapur.
- Pandhara rassa is also a goat curry from Kolhapur with white coconut-milk-based gravy.
- Popati (पोपटी) – A chicken dish with eggs and val papdi from the Raigad district of the coastal region.
- Malvani chicken
- Kombdi vade – A recipe from Konkan region. Deep-fried flatbread made from spicy rice and urid flour served with chicken curry, more specifically with Malvani chicken curry.

=== Seafood ===
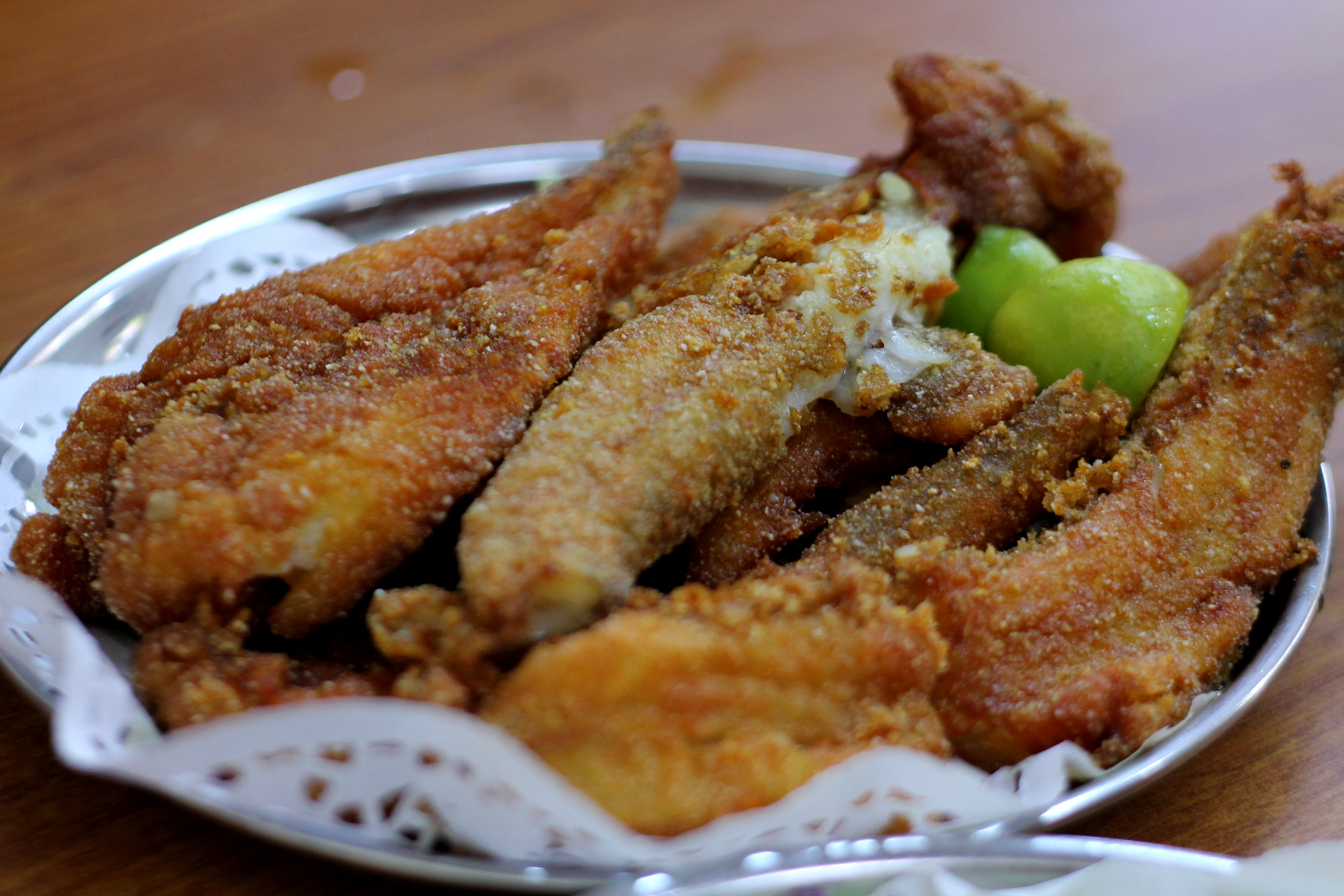
Fried Bombay duck

Seafood is a staple for many communities that hail from the Konkan region. Popular dishes include:

- prawn pullao rice
- Stuffed crabs
- Crab masala
- Malvani fish curries
- Kolambi masala
- Stuffed pomfret
- Bombay duck fry
- Prawns fry
- Bangada curry
- Dry Rawas (Rawasche sukhe)
- Fried surmai
- Fish koliwada (Note: Fish Koliwada is not part of traditional Maharashtrian cuisine, however, it is an iconic appetizer from Mumbai created by the Singh brothers, Bahadur and Hakam in the 1950s. In 1955, Bahadur Singh along with his brother Hakam Singh folded up their small dhaba near Delhi–Uttar Pradesh highway and moved to Sion in Mumbai where many from his community had already taken shelter after the Partition of India. The brothers started selling the fried fish from a bare-boned makeshift stall. The popularity of their crispy fried-fish led to their first eatery at Sion Koliwada in 1970, aptly named Mini Punjab.)

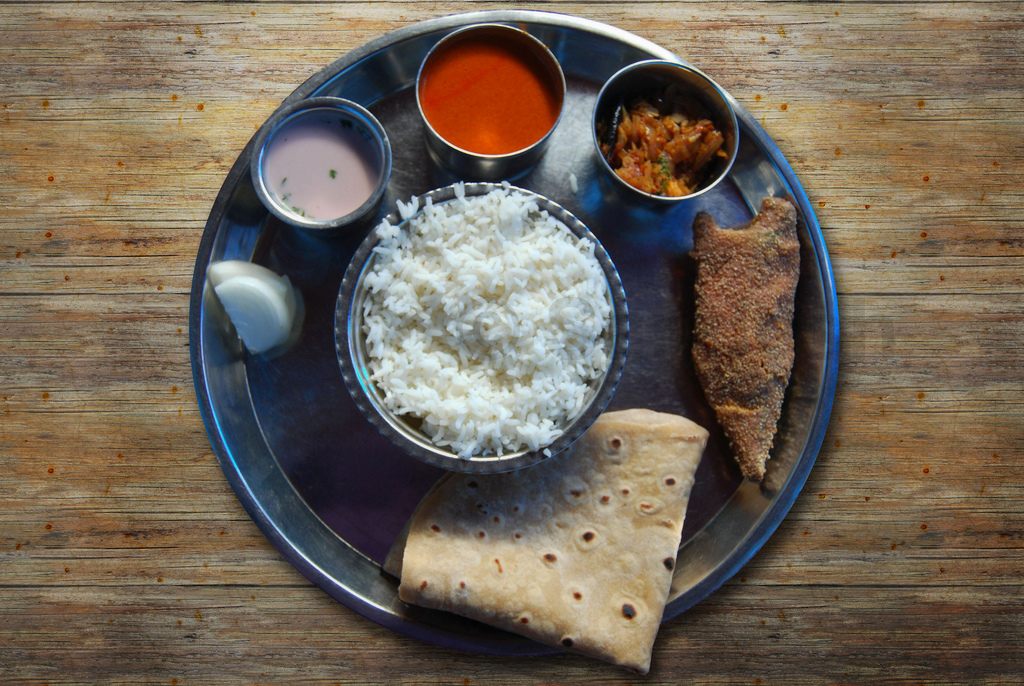
Solkadi and bangda fry

=== Curries and gravies served with rice ===
Various vegetable curries or gravies are eaten with rice, usually at both lunch and dinner. Popular dishes include:

- Amti – Lentil or bean curry, which is made mainly from toor dal or other lentils such as mung beans or chickpeas. In many instances, vegetables are added to the amti preparation. A popular amti recipe has pods of drumsticks added to the toor dal.
- Kadhi – This type of "curry" is made from a combination of buttermilk yoghurt and chickpea flour (besan). In some recipes fried balls based on besan are added.
- Solkadhi – This cold soup is prepared from coconut milk, garlic, cilantro, and kokam concoction, and is a specialty of the cuisine from the coastal region.
- Saar – Thin broth-like soups made from various dals or vegetables.
- Amsulache saar – Made with kokam.

=== Pickles and condiments ===
- Chutney and preserves – Chutneys and preserves popular in the cuisine include those based on raw mango, mint, tamarind, cilantro, panchamrit, Garlic and mirachicha thecha. Dry chutneys include those based on oil seeds such as flax seed, peanut, sesame, coconut and karale. Chutney based on the skin of roasted vegetables such as bottle gourd is also popular. Most chutneys include green or red chili pepper for their heat. Garlic may also be added.
- Metkut – A dry preparation based on a blend of dry roasted legumes and spices.
- Lon'che (pickle) – Maharashtrian and Indian pickles in general are prepared using a base of salt, oil and spices. Vegetables and fruits commonly used for pickling in Maharashtrian cuisine include unripe mango, lemons, Aonla, green chillies and Bhokar. Less commonly garlic, ridge gourd etc. are also used.
- Muramba — Made with unripe mangoes, spices, and sugar.

=== Beverages ===
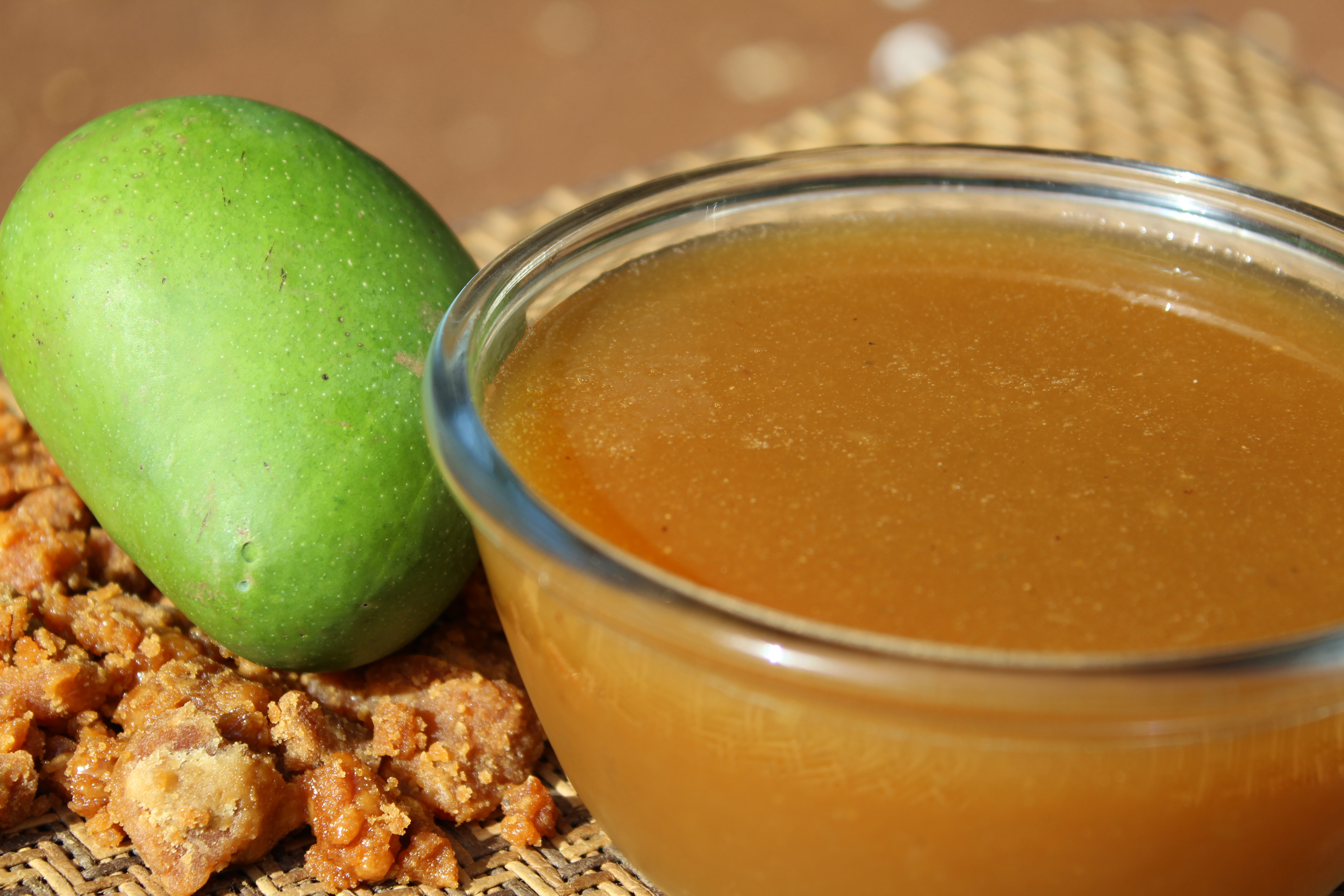
Kairi cha panha summer drink based on unripe mango and jaggery

In Maharashtra, the traditional offering (for a guest) used to be water and jaggery (Gulpani). This has been replaced by tea or coffee. These beverages are served with milk and sugar. Occasionally, along with tea leaves, the brew may include spices, freshly grated ginger and cardamom or lemon grass. Coffee is served with milk or ground nutmeg. Other beverages include:

- Kairi cha panha – A raw mango and jaggery-based drink which is popular during early summer, served cold.
- Piyush – A shrikhand and buttermilk-based sweet preparation.
- Kokum sarbat – kokum and sugar, served cold.
- Solkadhi -prepared with kokum and coconut milk
- Mattha – Spicy buttermilk, served cold.
- Sugar cane juice – The juice is obtained by crushing peeled sugar cane in a mill. In Maharashtra in every town there are dozens of juice centers where freshly squeezed sugarcane juice is served.
- Banana Shikran – This is consumed with chapatis or puri as part of a meal.
- Masala doodh – Sweet and spicy milk.

=== Sweets and desserts ===
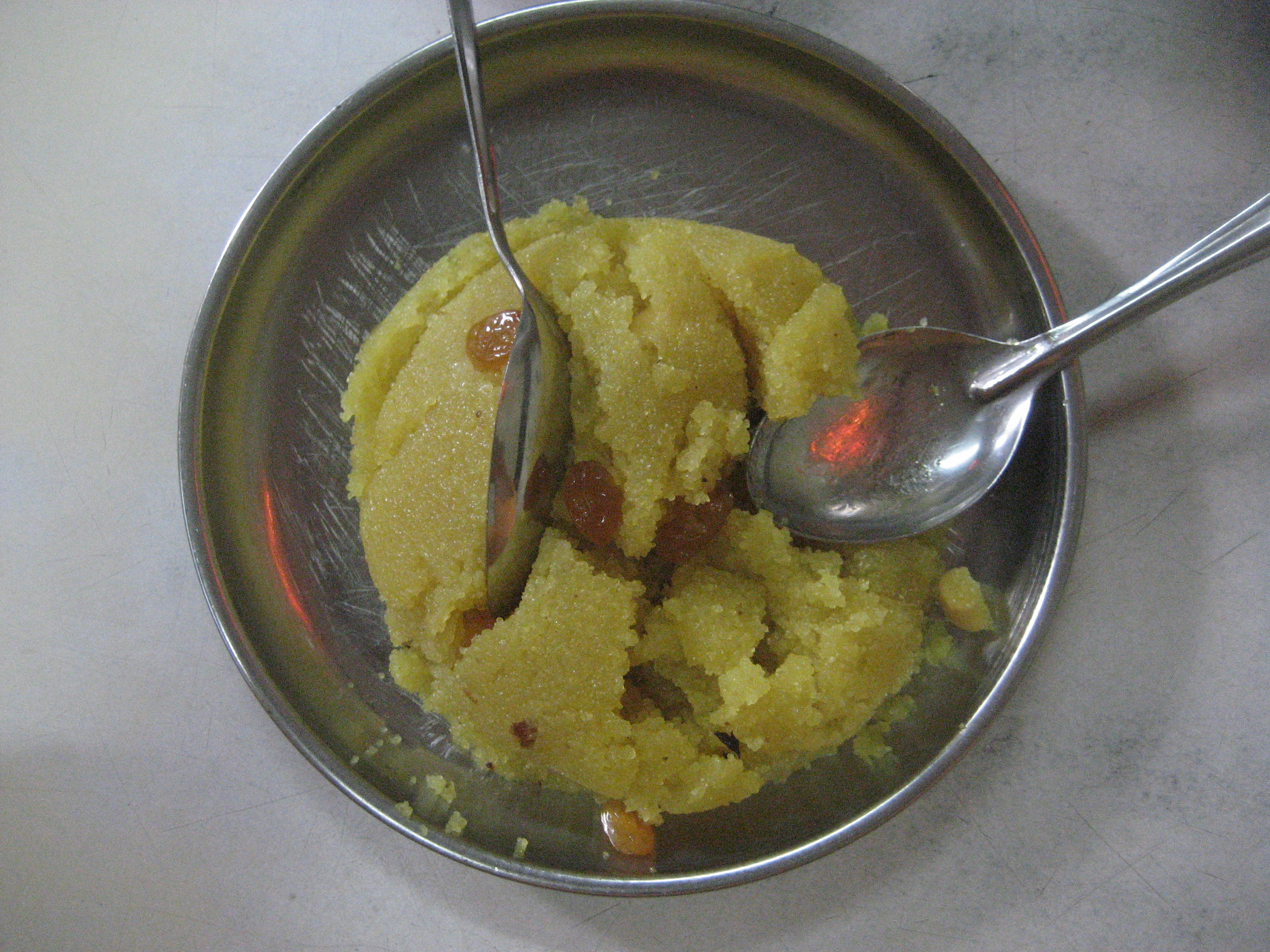
Shira

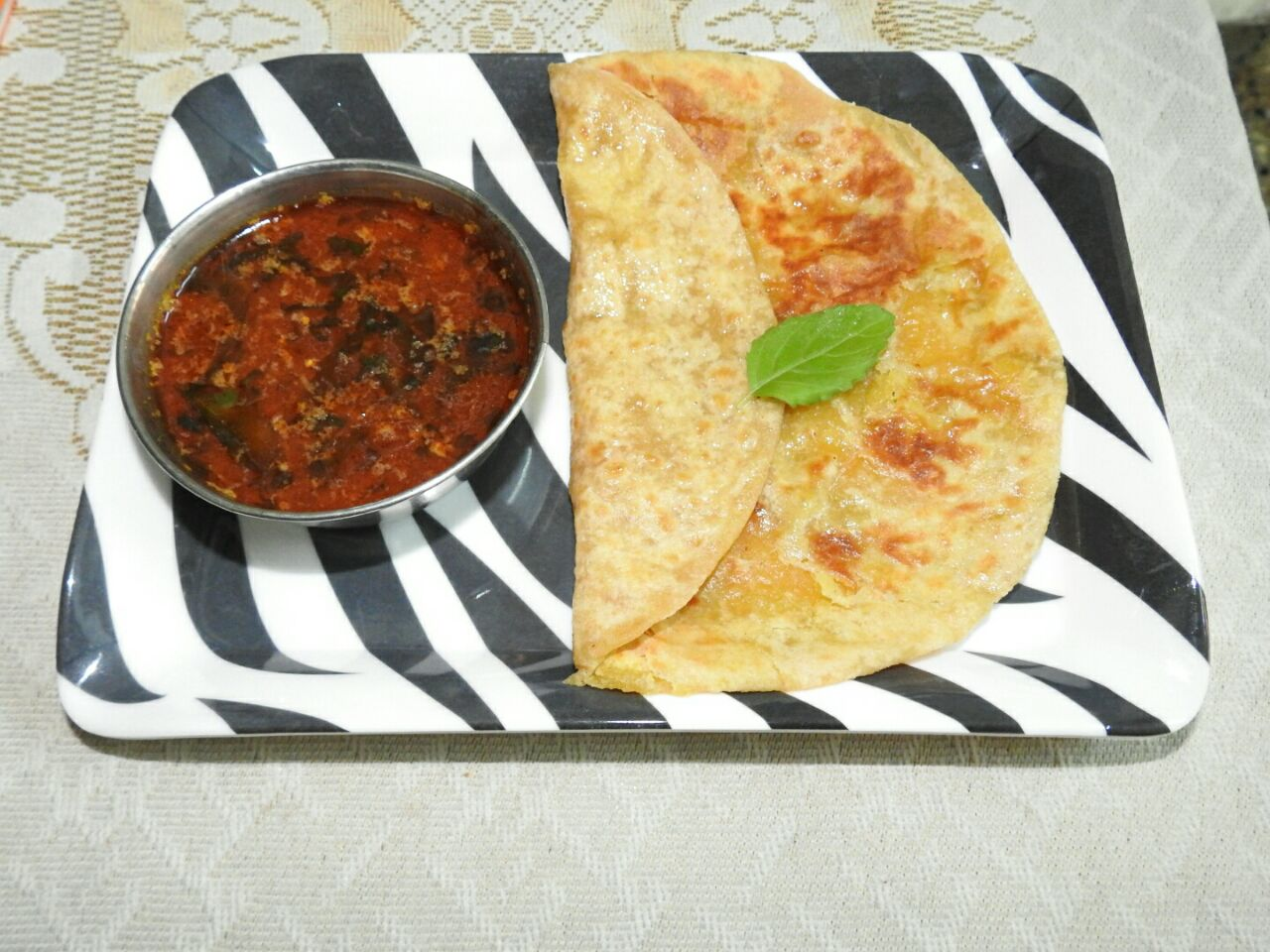
Puran Poli and Katachi Amti.This is popular for many special occasions including Holi

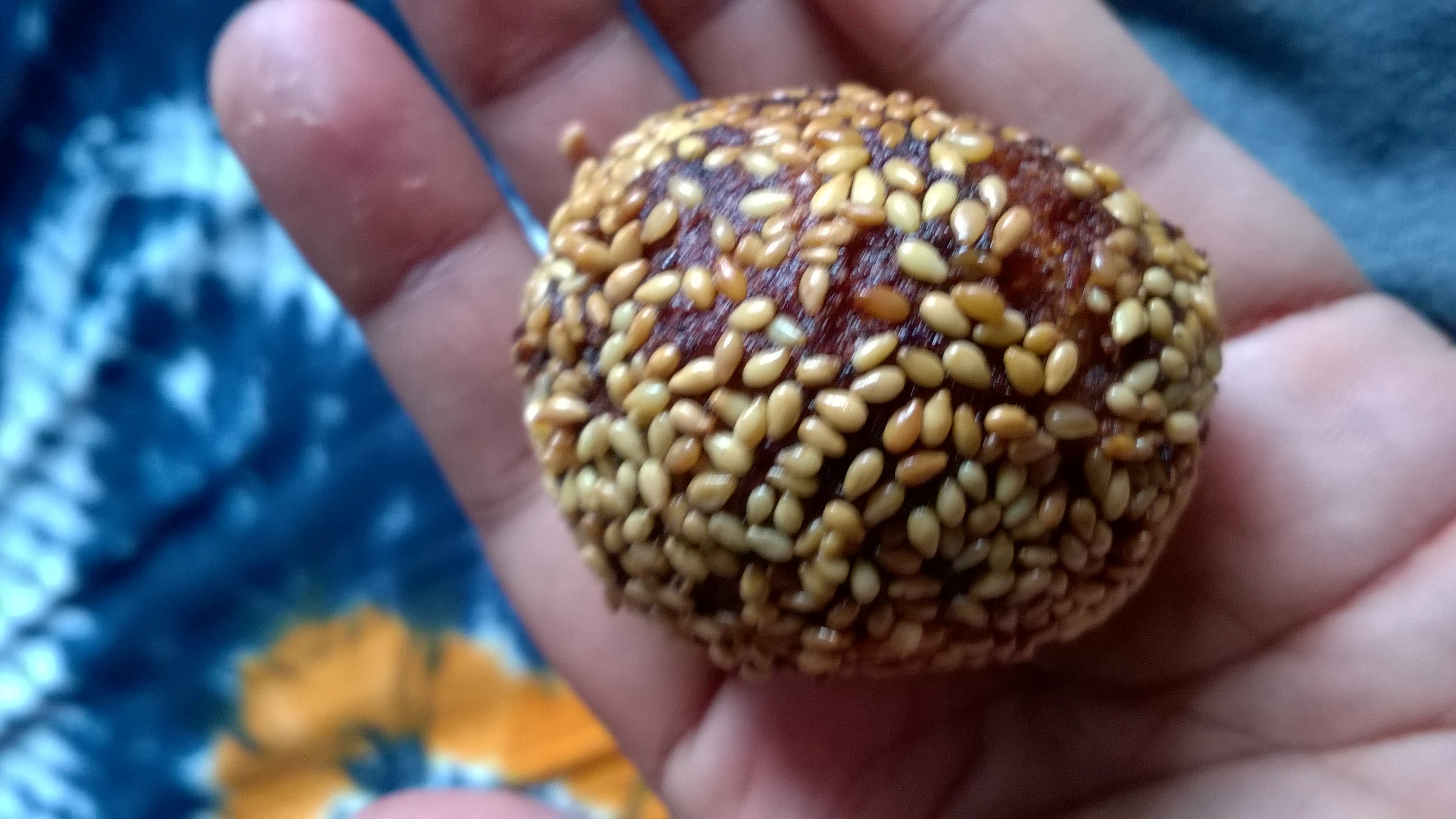
Anarsa

Desserts are important part of festival and special occasions. Typical desserts include, flatbread called puran poli with stuffed lentil and jaggery mix, a preparation made from strained yogurt, sugar and spices called shrikhand, a sweet milk preparation made with evaporated milk called basundi, semolina and sugar based kheer and steamed dumplings stuffed with coconut and jaggery called modak. In some instances, the modak is deep-fried instead of steamed.

- Puran Poli is one of the most popular sweet items in the Maharashtrian cuisine. It is a buttery flatbread stuffed with a mix made of jaggery (molasses or gur), yellow gram (chana) dal, plain flour, cardamom powder and ghee. It is consumed at almost all festivals. Puran Poli is usually served with milk or a sweet-and-sour dal preparation called katachi amti. In rural areas it used to be served with a thin hot sugar syrup called gulawani.
- Modak is a sweet dumpling that is steamed (ukdiche modak) or fried..
- Chirote is a combination of semolina and plain flour.
- Anarsa is made from soaked powdered rice with jaggery or sugar. The traditional process for creating the anarsa batter takes three days.
- Basundi is a sweetened dense milk dessert.
- Shrikhand is strained yogurt flavoured with sugar, saffron, cardamom and charoli nuts. Shrikhand is served with puri on auspicious occasions such as Gudhipadwa (Marathi new year).
- Amrakhand is Shrikhand flavoured with mango, saffron, cardamom and charoli nuts.
- Ladu are a popular snack traditionally prepared for Diwali. Ladus can be based on semolina, gram flour or bundi.
- Pedha are round balls made from a mixture of khoa, sugar and saffron.

=== Street food, restaurant and homemade snacks ===
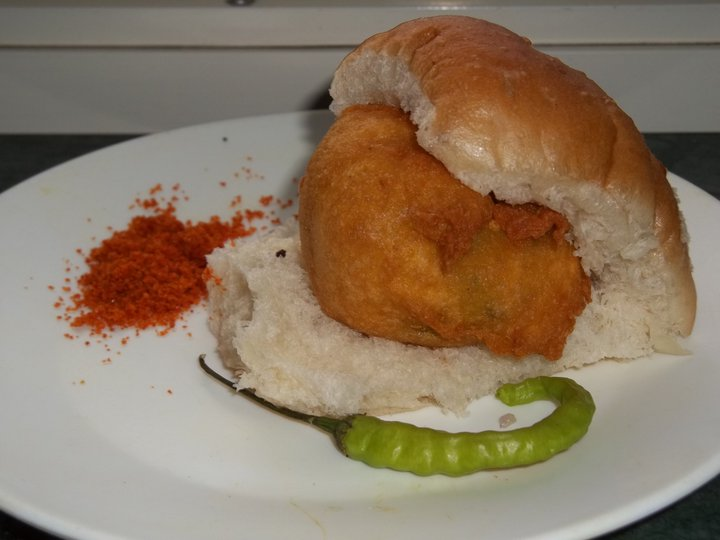
Vada pav

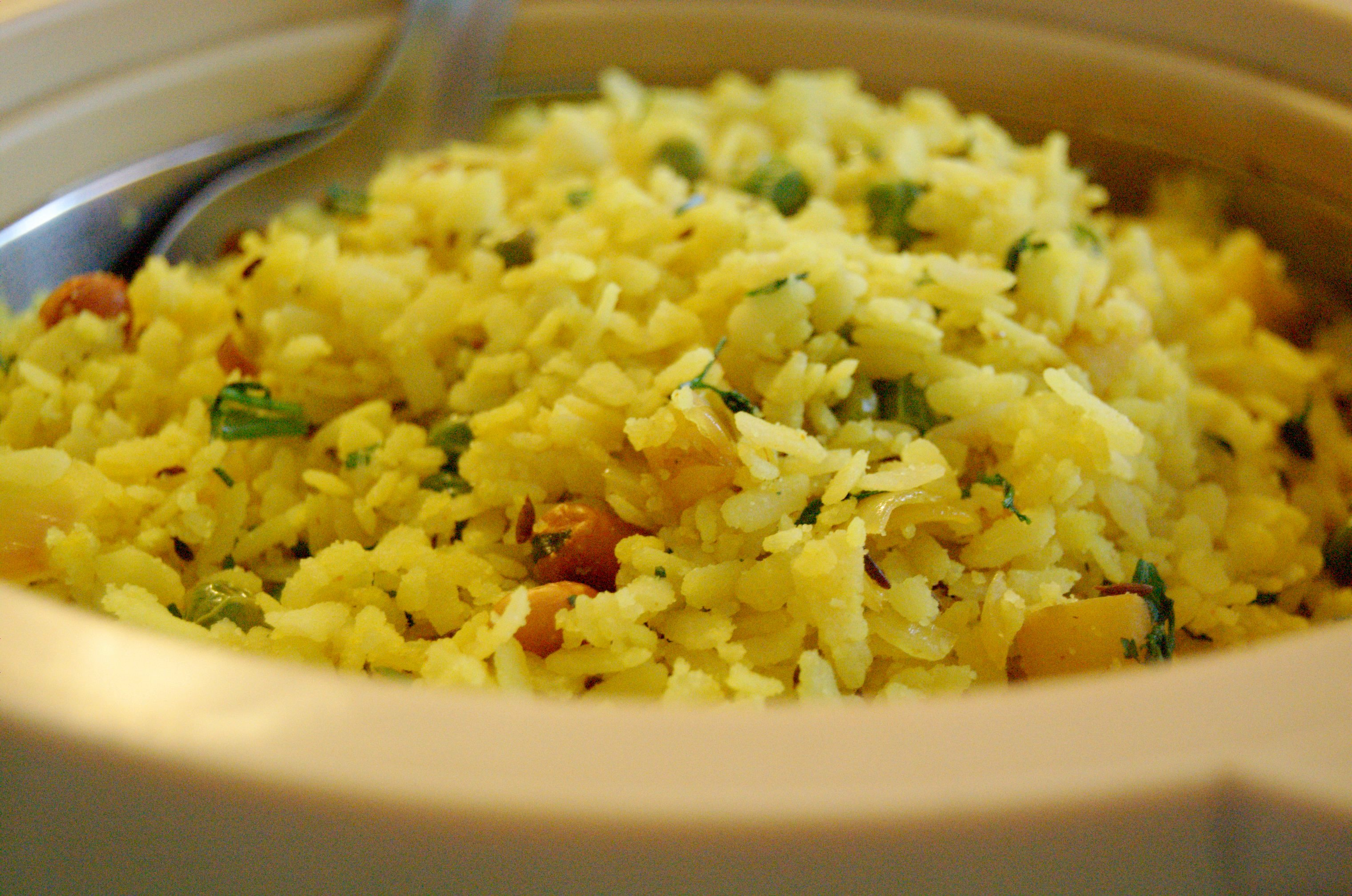
Cooked pohe/pohay

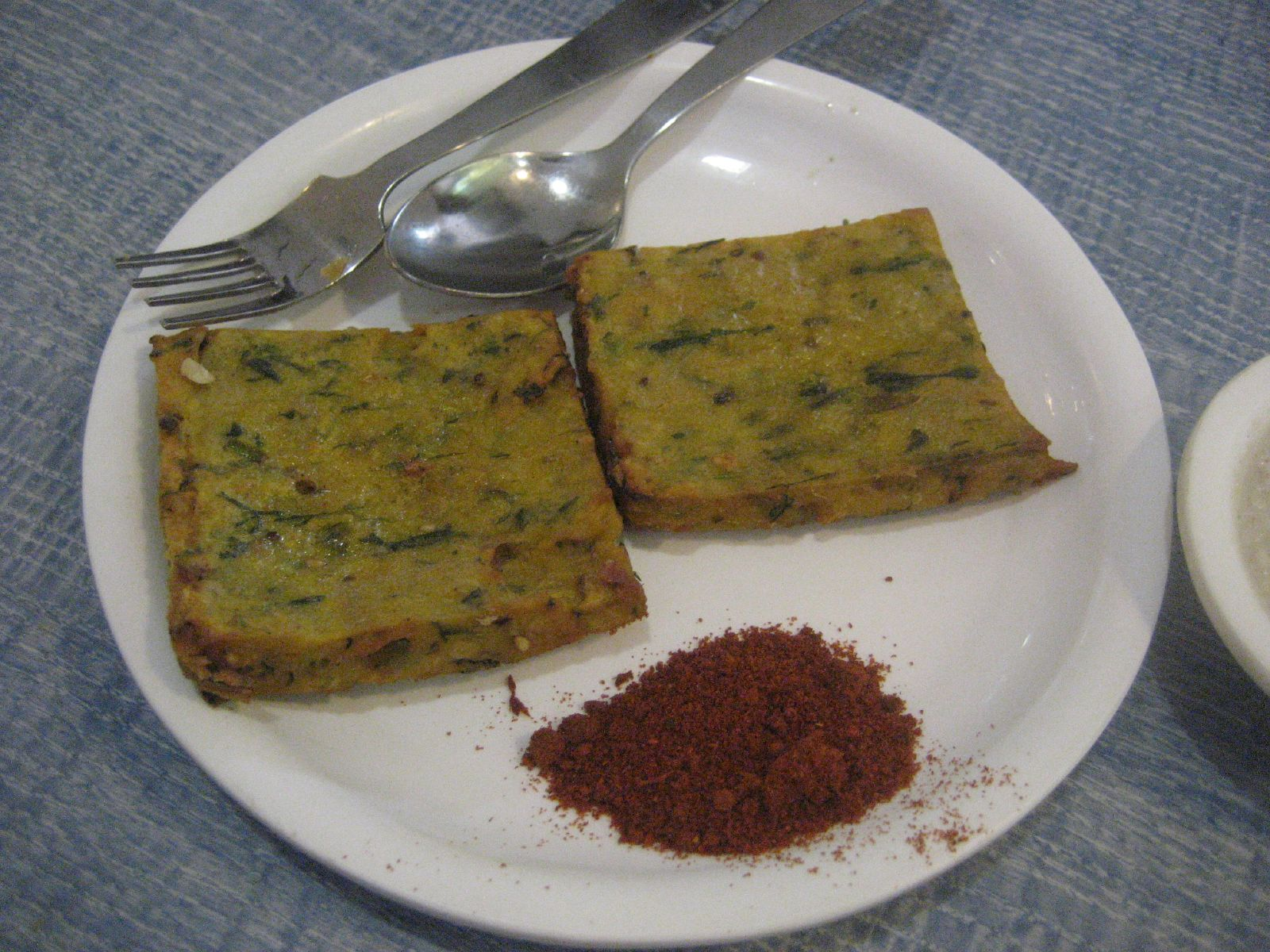
Kothimbir wadi

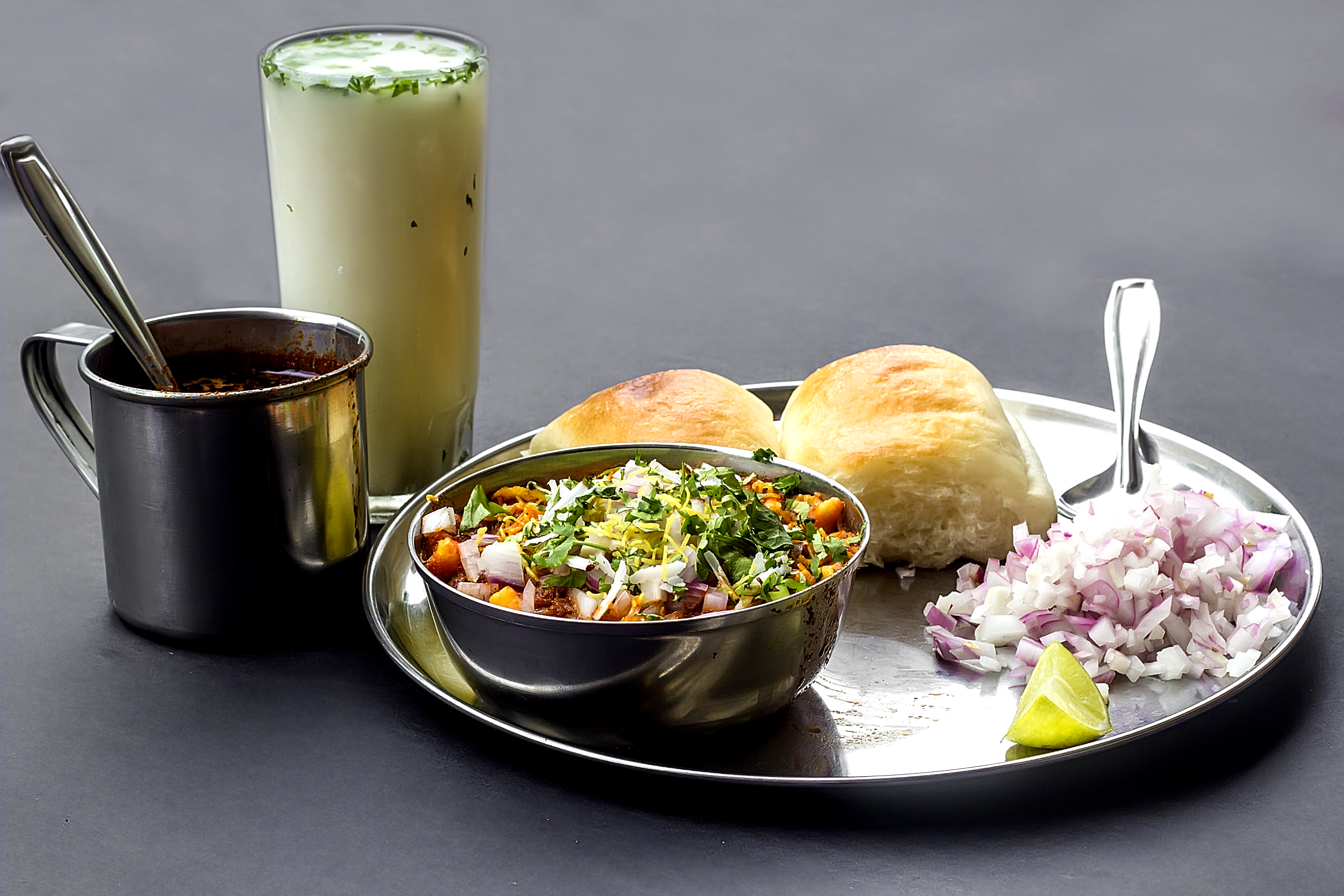
Misal Pav

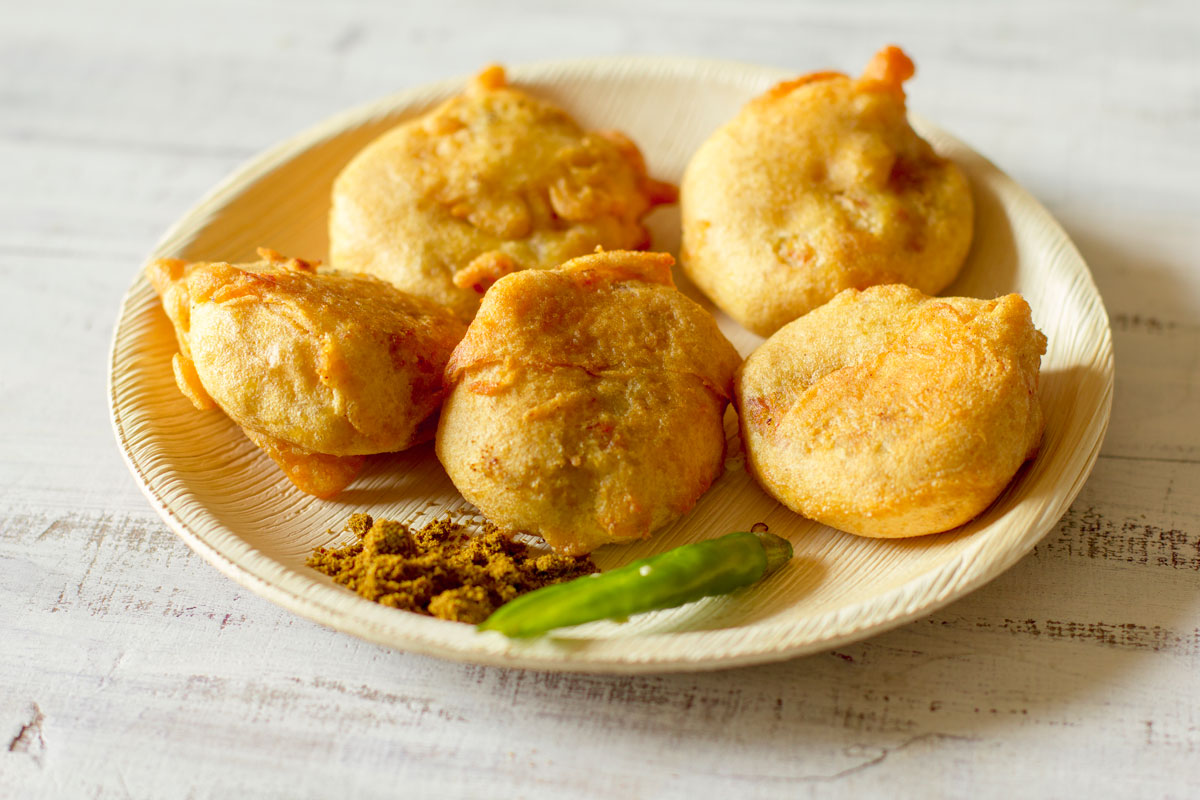
Batata vada

In many metropolitan areas, including Mumbai and Pune, fast food is popular. The most-popular forms are bhaji, vada pav, misalpav and pav bhaji. More-traditional dishes are sabudana khichadi, pohe, upma, sheera and panipuri. Most Marathi fast food and snacks are lacto-vegetarian.

Some dishes, including sev bhaji, misal pav and patodi are regional dishes within Maharashtra.

- Chivda is spiced flattened rice. It is also known as "Bombay mix" in the UK.
- Pohe is a snack made from pounded rice. It is typically served with tea and is the most likely dish that a Maharashtrian will offer a guest. During arranged marriages, kanda pohe (literal translation, "pohe prepared with onion") is most likely the dish served when the two families meet. It is so common that sometimes arranged marriage itself is referred colloquially as kanda pohay. Other variants include batata pohe (where diced potatoes are used instead of onion shreds). Other variants recipes of pohe are dadpe pohe, a mixture of raw pohe with shredded fresh coconut, green chillies, ginger and lemon juice and kachche pohe, raw pohe with minimal embellishments of oil, red chili powder, salt and unsautéed onion shreds.
- Upma, sanja or upeeth is similar to the South Indian upma. It is a thick porridge made from semolina perked up with green chillies, onions and other spices.
- Vada pav is a fast food dish consisting of a fried mashed potato dumpling (vada), eaten sandwiched in a wheat bread bun (pav). This is the Indian version of a burger and is almost always accompanied with red chutney made from garlic and fried red and green chillies. Vada pav in its entirety is rarely made at home, mainly because home baking is not common.
- Pav bhaji is a fast food dish consisting of a vegetable curry (Marathi: bhaji) served with a soft bread roll (pav).
- Misal Pav is a dish made from curried sprouted lentils, topped with batata bhaji, pohay, chivda, farsaan, raw chopped onions and tomato. It is sometimes eaten with yogurt. Usually, the misal is served with a wheat-bread bun.
- Thalipeeth is a type of flatbread. It is usually spicy and eaten with curd. It is a popular traditional breakfast that is prepared using bhajani, a mixture of roasted lentils.
- Sabudana Khichadi: Sautéed sabudana (pearls of sago palm), a dish commonly eaten on religious fast days.
- Khichdi is made of rice and dal with mustard seeds and onions to add flavor.
- Varanfal is traditional Maharashtrian cuisine made up of pieces of dough cooked in the curry of Toor dal. Dal dhokli is a similar dish popular in Gujarat and Rajasthan.
- Chana daliche dheerde is a savory crepe made with chana dal.

Like most Indian cuisines, Maharashtrian cuisine is laced with many fried savories, including:

- Aluchi vadi is prepared from colocasia leaves rolled in chickpea flour, steamed and then pan fried.
- Kothimbirichi vadi is made with cilantro leaves.
- Suralichi vadi is a savory snack made from gram flour and yogurt. It consists of yellowish, tightly rolled bite-sized pieces. with garnishing of coconut, coriander leaves and mustard.
- Bhelpuri: Bhelpuri (Marathi भेळ) is a savoury snack, and is also a type of chaat. It is made of puffed rice, chopped vegetables such as tomatoes and onions and a tangy tamarind sauce. Bhelpuri is often associated with Mumbai beaches, such as Girguam or Juhu. Bhelpuri is thought to have originated within the cafes and street-food stalls of Mumbai, and has spread across India where it was modified to suit local food availability. It is also said to be originated from Bhadang (भडंग), a spicy puffed-rice dish from Western Maharashtra. Dry bhel is made from bhadang.
- Sevpuri type of chaat. It originates from Mumbai. In Mumbai, sev puri is strongly associated with street food, but is also served at upscale locations. Supermarkets stock ready-to-eat packets of sev puri and similar snacks like bhelpuri.
- Ragda pattice is a popular Mumbai fast food. This dish is usually served at restaurants that offer Indian fast food along with other dishes. It is a main item on menus of food stalls. This dish has two parts: ragda, a spicy stew based on dry peas and fried potato patties.
- Dahipuri is a form of chaat and from Mumbai. It is served with mini puri shells that are more-popularly recognized from the dish pani puri. Dahi puri and pani puri chaats are often sold from the same vendor.
- Sabudana vada is a deep-fried snack based on sabudana. It is often served with spicy green chutney and hot chai and is best eaten fresh.

== Special occasions and festivals ==
=== Makar Sankrant ===
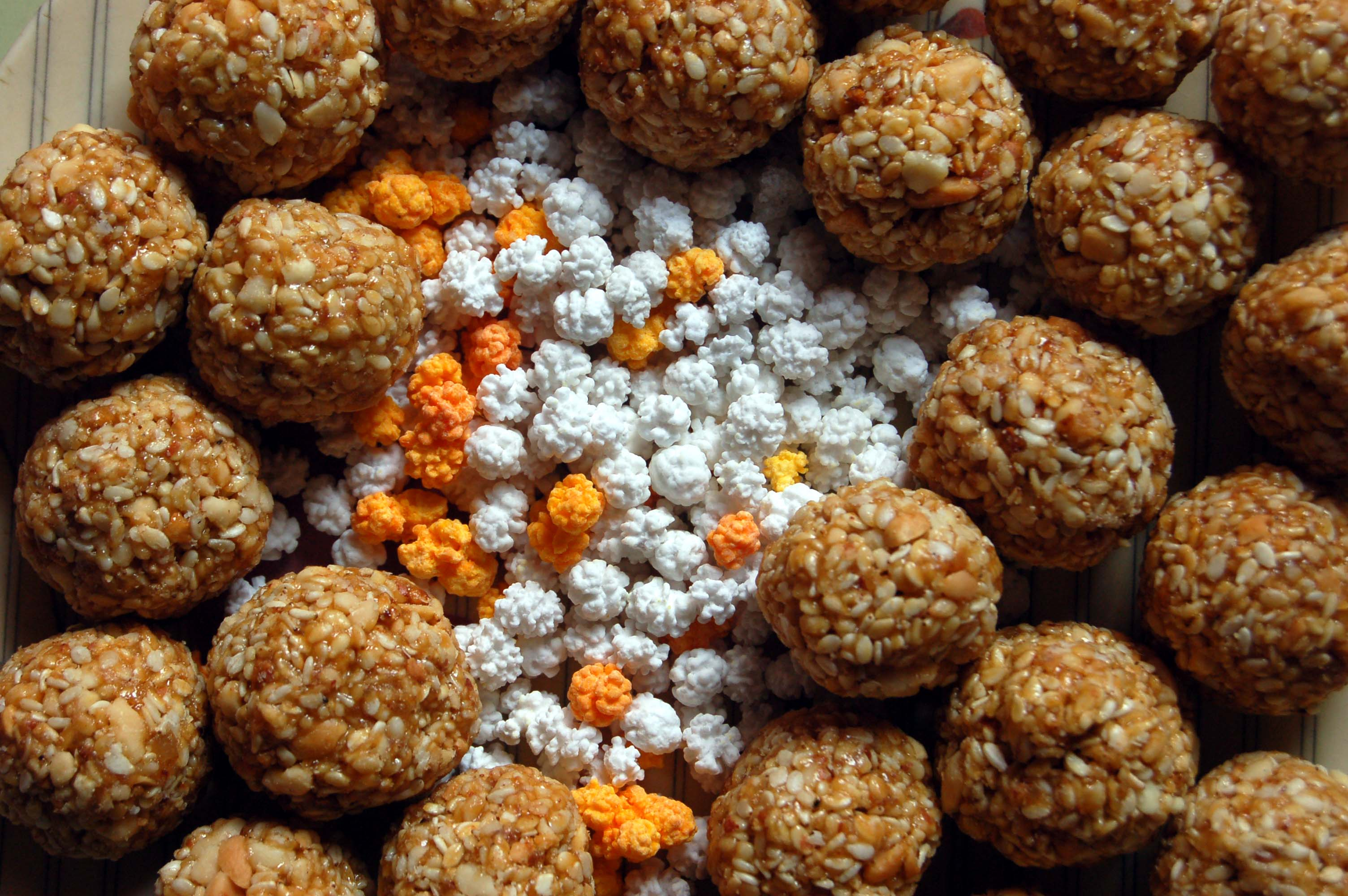
Two types of tilgul, a Maharashtrian sweet snack

Makar Sankranti usually falls on January 14 of the Gregorian calendar. Maharashtrians exchange tilgul or sweets made of jaggery and sesame seeds along with the customary salutation, tilgul ghya aani god bola (Marathi: तीळगुळ घ्या आणि गोड गोड बोला), which means "Accept the tilgul and talk sweetly." Tilgul Poli or gulpoli are the main sweet preparations. It is a wheat-based flatbread filled with sesame seeds and jaggery.

=== Mahashivratri ===
Marathi Hindu people fast on this day. Fasting food includes chutney prepared with pulp of the or kavath fruit (Wood apple). Some communities use the pulp of Bael/.

=== Holi ===
As part of Holi, a festival that is celebrated on the full moon evening in the month of Falgun (March or April), a bonfire is lit to symbolize the end of winter and the slaying of a demon in Hindu mythology. People make puran poli as a ritual offering to the holy fire. The day after the bonfire night is called Dhulivandan. Marathi people celebrate with colors on the fifth day after the bonfire on Rangpanchami.

=== Ganesh Chaturthi ===
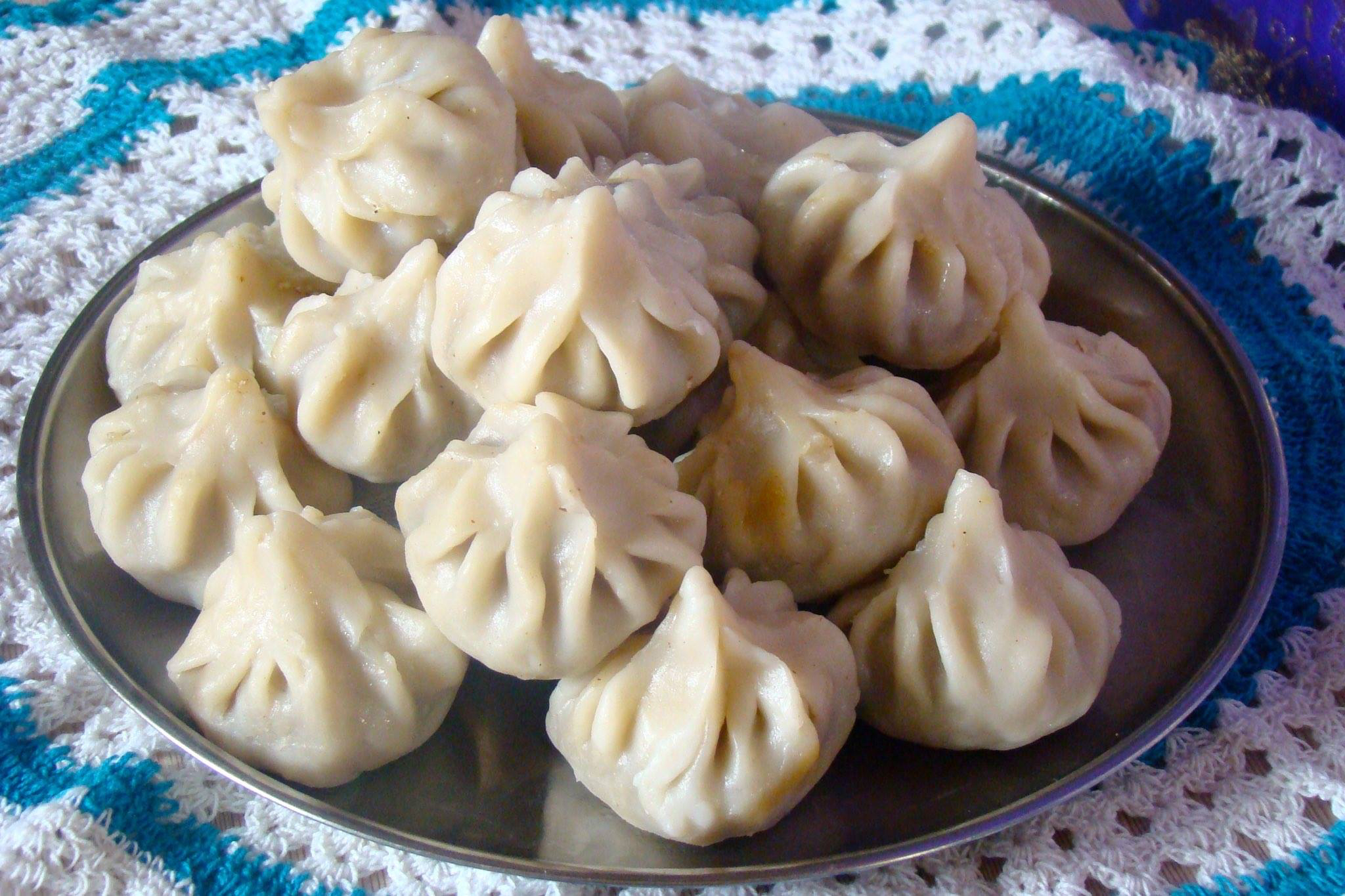
Steamed.odak

Modak is said to be the favorite food of Ganesh. An offering of twenty-one pieces of this sweet preparation is offered on Ganesh Chaturthi and other minor Ganesh-related events.

=== Diwali ===
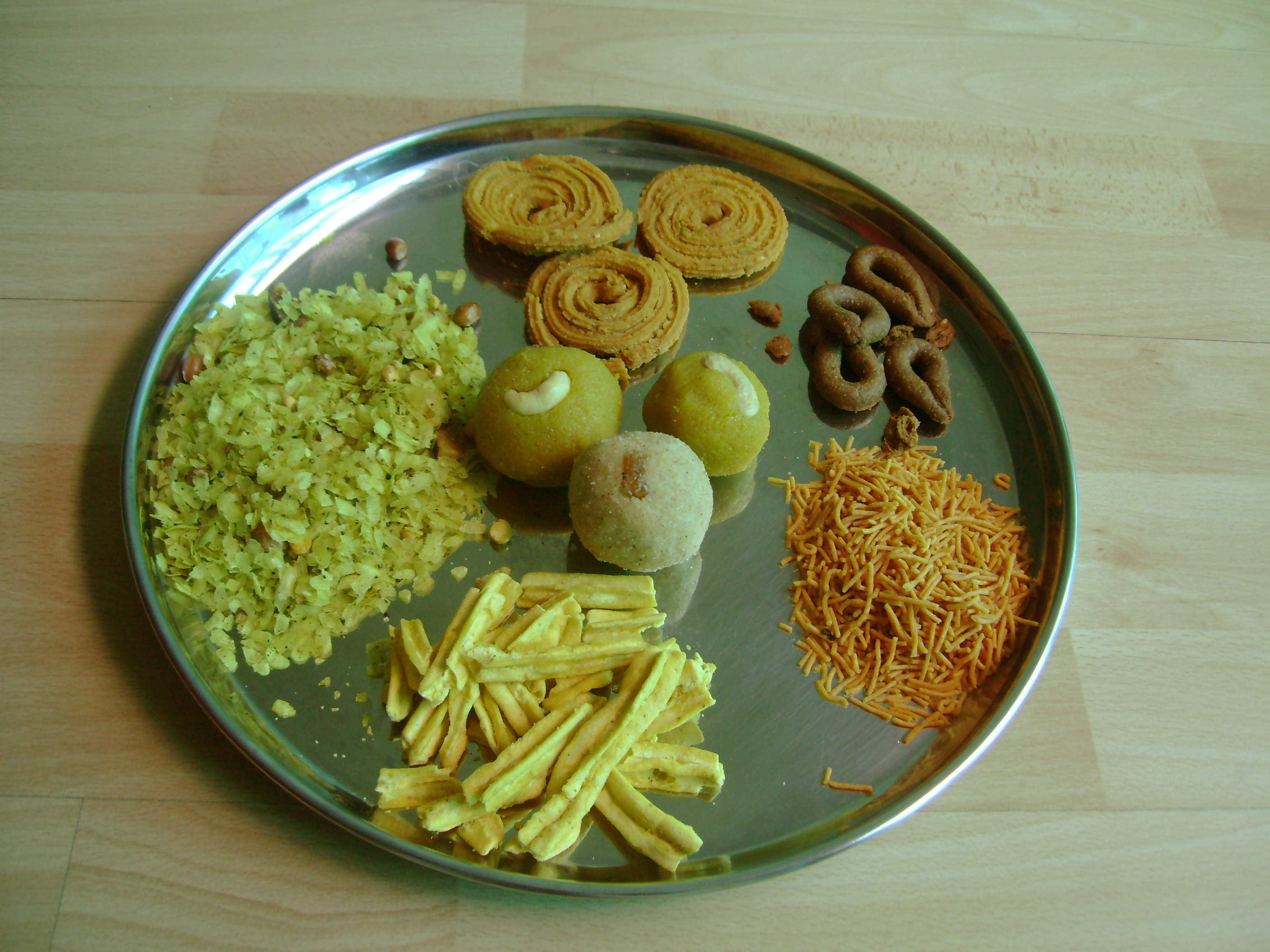
A plate of snack (faral). Clockwise from top: chakli, kadboli, shev, gaathi, chiwda; centre: besan and white rava ladu.

Diwali is one of the most popular Hindu festivals. In Maharashtrian tradition family members have a ritual bath before dawn and then sit down for a breakfast of fried sweets and savory snacks called Diwali Faral. These sweets and snacks are offered to visitors and exchanged with neighbors. Typical sweet preparations include ladu, anarse, shankarpali and karanjya. Popular savory treats include chakli, Shev and chiwda.

=== Champa Sashthi ===
Many Maharashtrian communities from all social levels observe the Khandoba Festival or Champa Shashthi in the month of Mārgashirsh. Households perform Ghatasthapana of Khandoba during this festival. The sixth day of the festival is called Champa Sashthi. For many people, the Chaturmas period ends on Champa Sashthi. It is customary for many families not to consume onions, garlic and eggplant during the Chaturmas. Following the festival, the consumption of these foods resumes with ritual preparation of vangyache bharit (baingan bharta) with rodga.

=== Traditional wedding menu ===
The main Hindu wedding meal typically ended with plain rice and mattha. Some of the most-popular curries to go with this menu and with other festivals were those prepared from taro (Marathi: अलउ) leaves. Buttermilk with spices and coriander leaves, called mattha, is served with the meal. Popular sweets for the wedding menu were shreekhand, boondi ladu and jalebi.

=== Hindu fasting cuisine ===
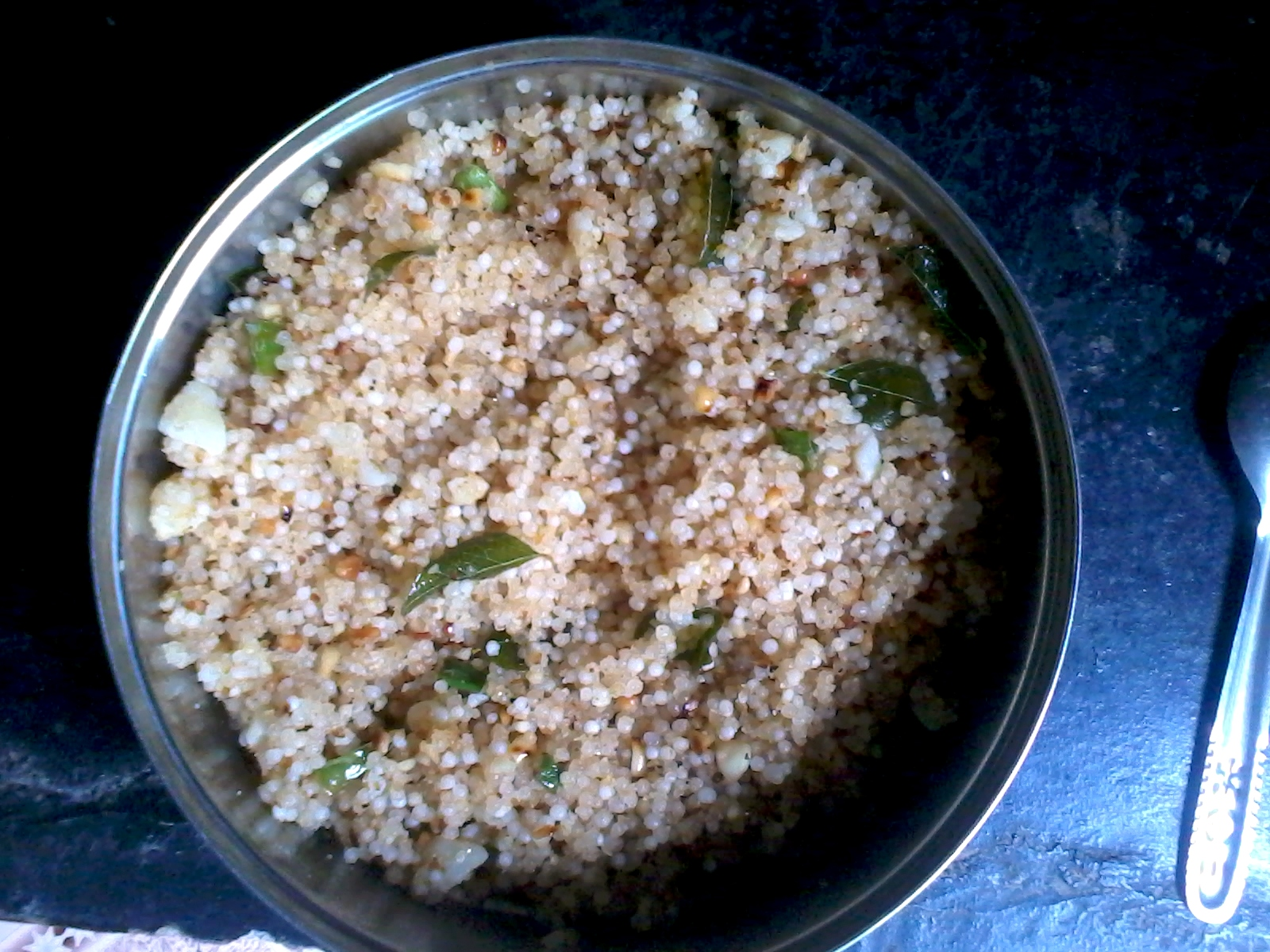
Sabudana khichadi.A snack popular on Hindu fasting days

Marathi Hindu people fast on days such as Ekadashi, in honour of Lo Vishnu or his Avatars, Chaturthi in honour of Ganesh, Mondays in honour of Shiva, or Saturdays in honour of Maruti or Saturn. Only certain kinds of foods are allowed to be eaten. These include milk and other dairy products (such as dahi), fruit and Western food items such as sago, potatoes, purple-red sweet potatoes, amaranth seeds, nuts and varyache tandul (shama millet). Popular fasting dishes include Sabudana Khichadi or danyachi amti (peanut soup).

=== Christmas ===
East Indian Catholic Community of North Konkan also have their own special recipes for Christmas. Just like Goa, this includes pork vindaloo and sorpotel. A popular sweet for Christmas includes Fogeas made out of flour, coconut milk, sugar and cottage cheese. These sweets are offered to visitors and exchanged with neighbors and friends.

== See also ==
- Indian cuisine
- List of plants used in Indian cuisine
- Dalit Kitchens of Marathwada
