= Varanfal =

Varanfal is a traditional Maharashtrian dish, also known as Chakolya. It consists of wheat dumplings cooked in a toor dal curry which is sweet and spicy. Prepared with less oil than other recipes, it is a healthy option during the festival and monsoon seasons. It is similar to dal dhokli in Gujarati cuisine.

It is often served with Ghee (Clarified butter) and chopped fresh Coriander leaves. It may be eaten by sprinkling some fresh Lime juice over it or with Dahi (Curd).
