= Dal dhokli =

Indian dish

Dal Dhokli
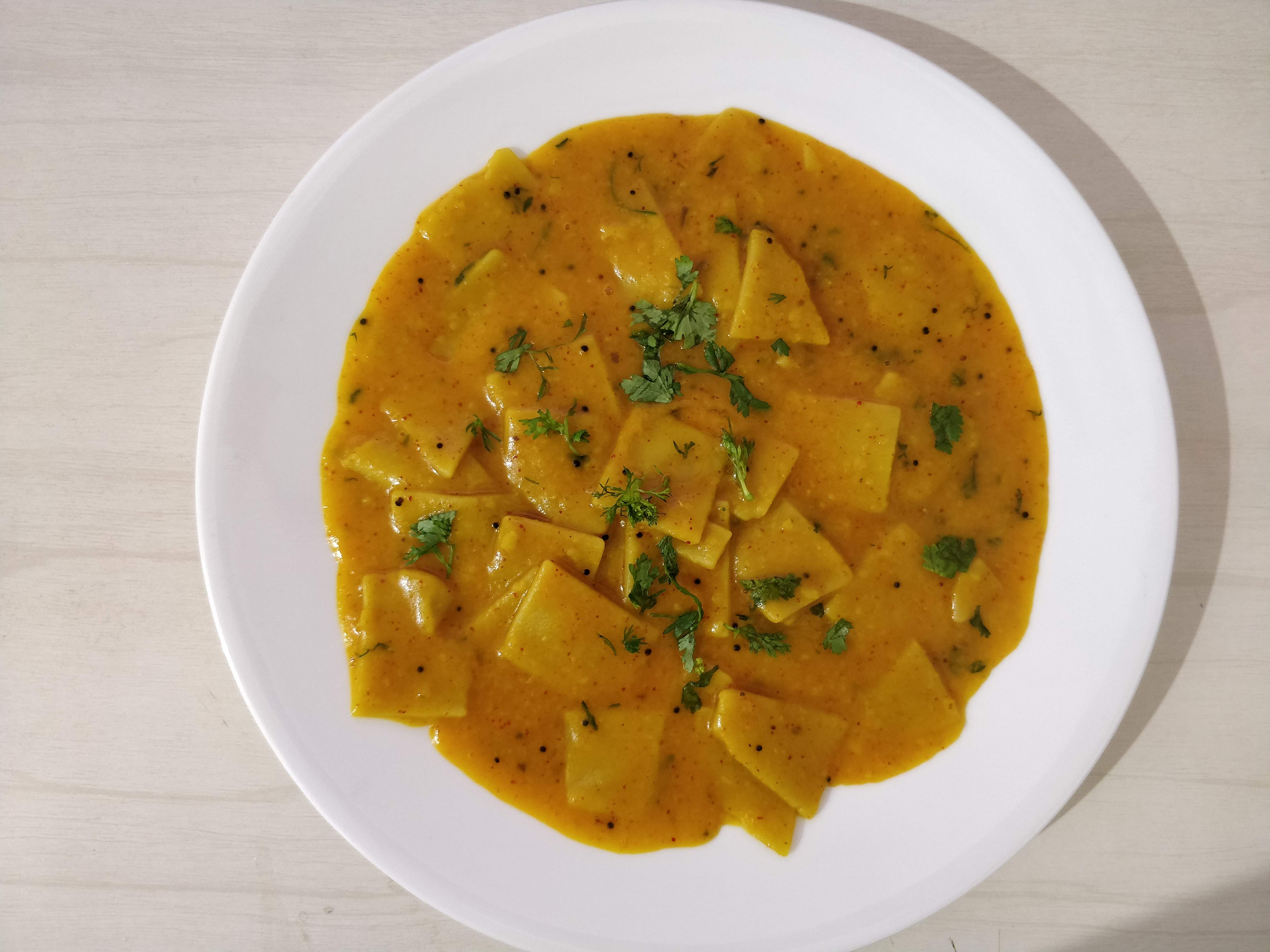
- Dal Dhokli served in a bowl
- Alternative names: Dal pithouri, Dal pithi
- Place of origin: Indian subcontinent
- Region or state: Rajasthan, Madhya Pradesh & Gujarat
- Associated cuisine: India
- Main ingredients: Dal, Dhokli/pithi

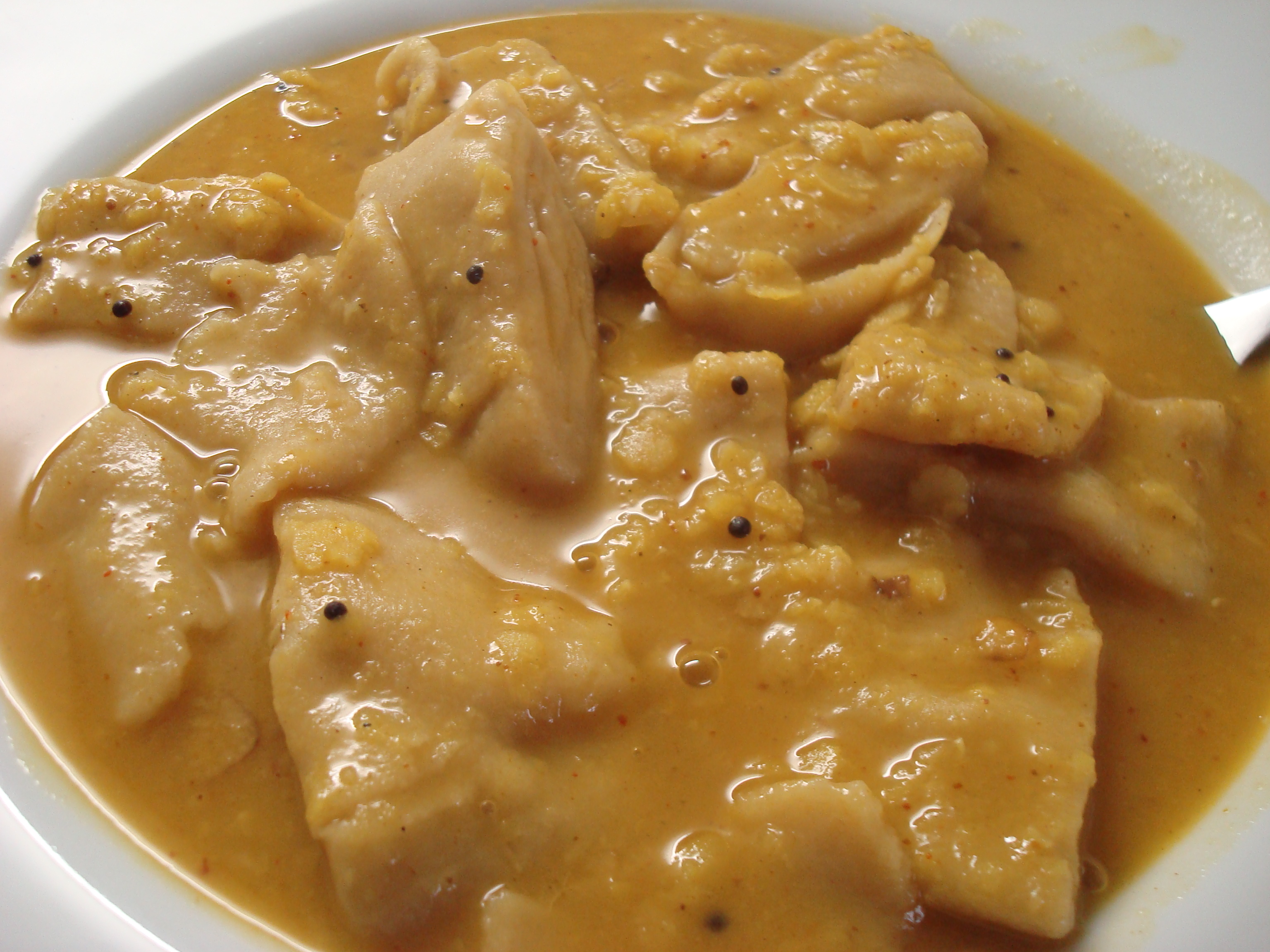
A plate full of daal dhokli

Daal dhokli (Gujarati: દાળ ઢોકળી) is an Indian dish that originated in Gujarat however also popular in Rajasthan. made by boiling wheat flour pieces in a toor dal stew. A similar preparation is called varanfal (Marathi: वरण फळ), or chakolyaa (Marathi: चकोल्या) in Marathi. In some household traditions it is made out of leftover dal.

== Preparation ==
Daal dhokli can be made with various types of daal. Some commonly used daals include toor (split pigeon peas), masoor (red lentil), and moong (mung bean). The daal is then pressure-cooked with water and tempered with spices to create a stew. The dhokli, or wheat flour pieces, are made by kneading a dough of wheat flour, salt, and water, rolling it, and cutting into pieces.

Some variations add peanuts. Other flavors in the dish can come from kokum, jaggery, and spices like cumin and asafoetida.
