= Jolada rotti =

Unleavened Indian bread

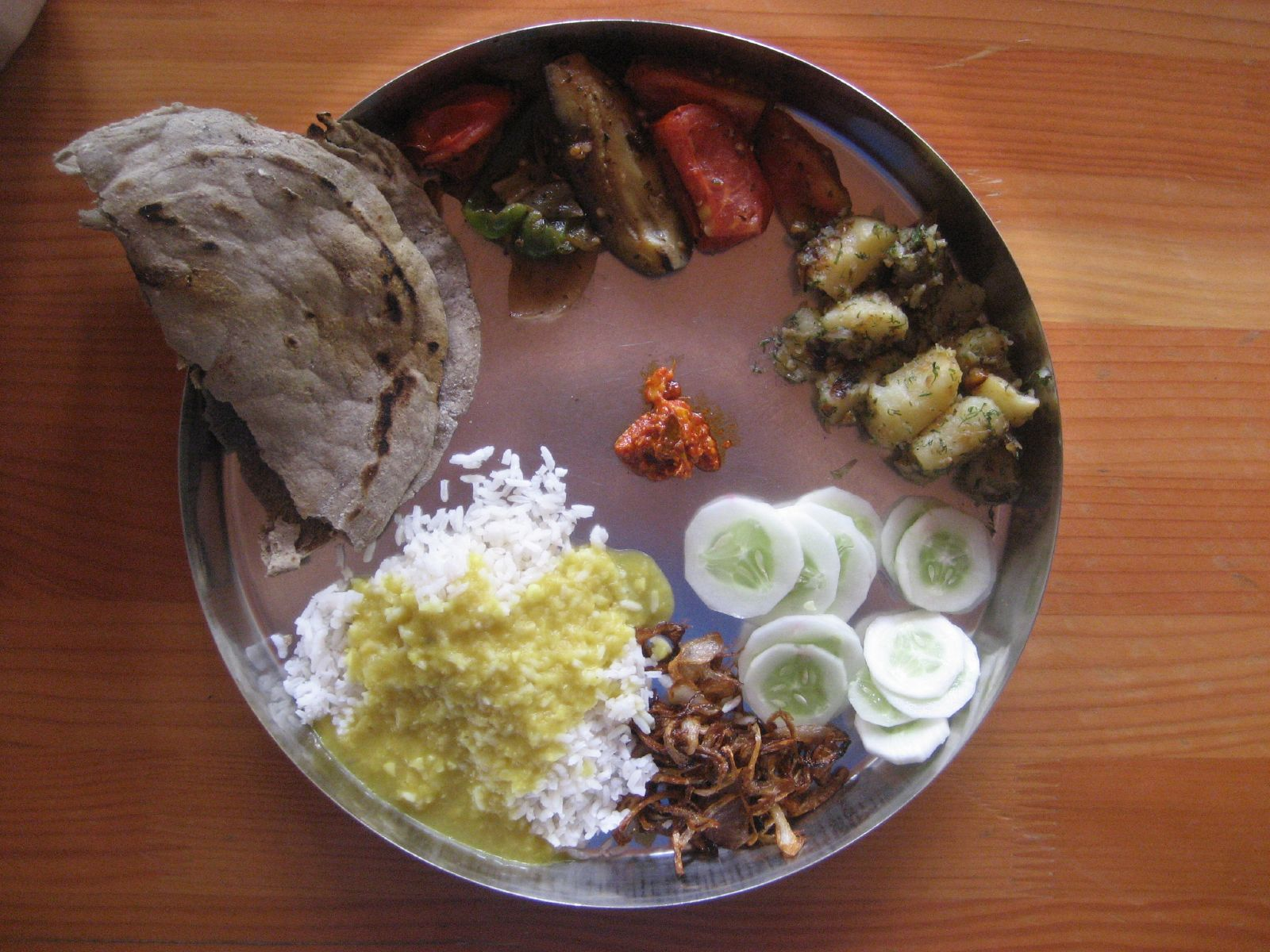
- Alternative names: Jonne Rotte, Bijapur billi, jollad rotti, bhakri
- Type: Bread
- Place of origin: India
- Region or state: Maharashtra, Karnataka, Telangana, Andhra Pradesh
- Serving temperature: Both hot and room temperature
- Main ingredients: Sorghum

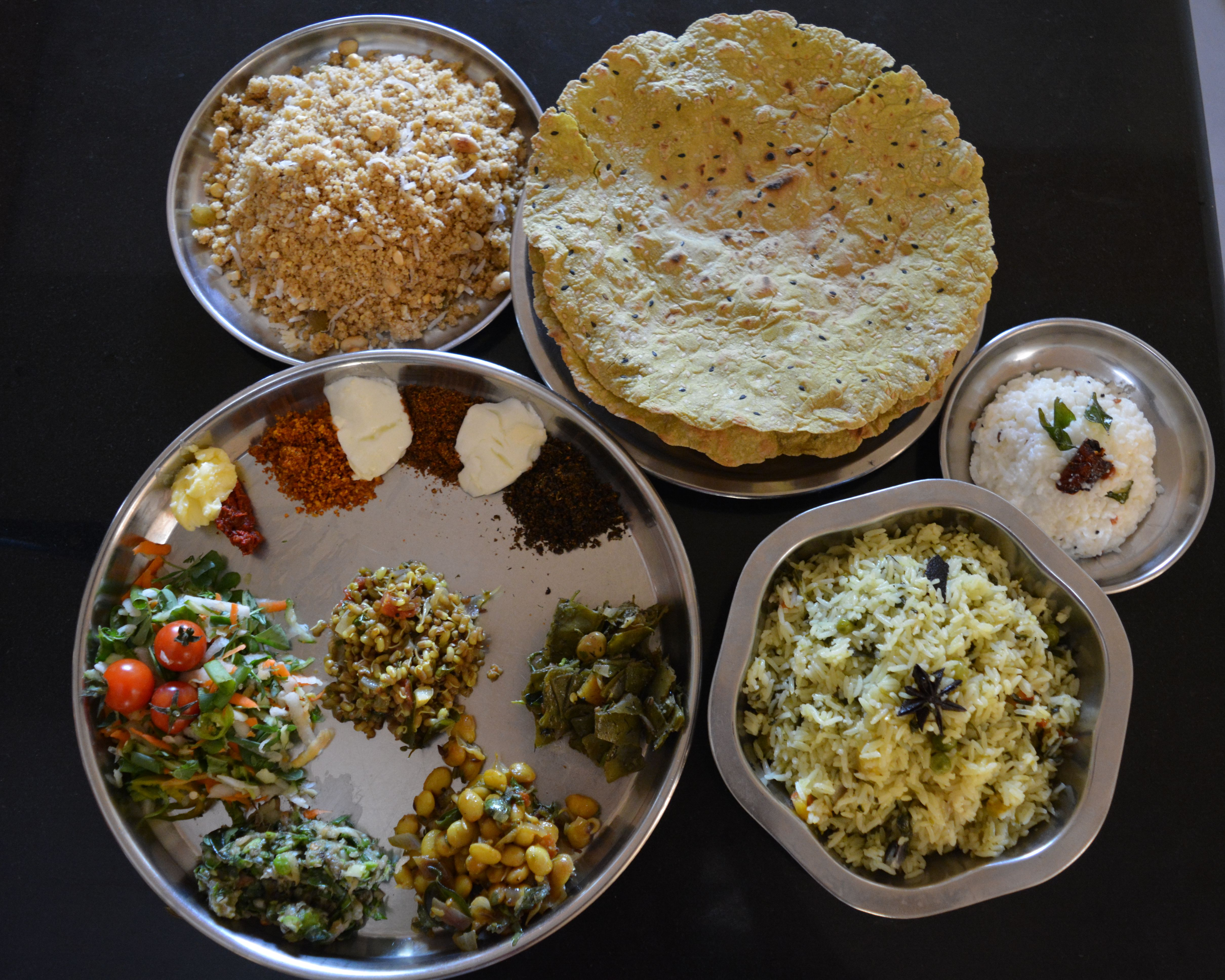
North Karnataka and Central Karnataka staple; kadak roti, served with various palya and chutney podi with yogurt.

Jōḷada roṭṭi (Kannada), Jowar roti, or Jonna rotte (Telugu), is an unleavened Indian bread made of sorghum, similar to bhakri. It is coarser than a roti. It can be either soft or hard in texture, compared to a khakhra or cracker with respect to hardness. The name literally translates to "sorghum bread". Jowar roti is part of the staple diet of most of the districts of North Karnataka, where it is eaten with pulse curries such as jhunka, yengai, shenga (peanut) chutney or other assorted chutneys. It is called jawarichi bhakri in neighboring Maharashtra.

== See also ==
- Bhakri
- Akki rotti
- List of Indian breads
