= Indian breads =

Various flatbreads and crêpes in Indian cuisine

Indian breads are a wide variety of flatbreads and crêpes that are an integral part of Indian cuisine. Their variation reflects the diversity of Indian culture and food habits.

== Ingredients ==
Most flatbreads from northern India are unleavened and made primarily from milled flour, usually atta or maida, and water. Some flatbreads, especially paratha, may be stuffed with vegetables and layered with either ghee or butter.

In Maharashtra and Gujarat, breads are also made from grains like jowar (Sorghum bicolor), ragi (Eleusine coracana), rice and bajra (pearl millet), and are called "rotla" in Gujarat and "bhakri" in Maharashtra.

Most Indian breads make use of the yeast spores in the atmosphere for fermentation.

== Preparation ==
In northern India, a dough of the main ingredient is prepared and flattened by rolling. Most Indian breads, such as roti, kulcha and chapati, are baked on tava, a griddle made from cast iron, steel or aluminum. Others such as puri and bhatura are deep-fried. The dough for these breads is usually made with less water in order to reduce the oil soaked up when frying.

In Southern India, a batter of rice and black lentils is prepared and ladled in small amounts onto a hot greased skillet, where it is spread out into a thin circle and fried with oil or ghee until golden brown. In Western India (including the states of Maharashtra, Gujarat and Rajasthan) bread may be made from coarse grains such as bajra, sorghum or ragi, though wheat is the staple in these regions. The grains or cereals are usually milled into a fine powder, and mixed with a little water to make a smooth dough. This dough is patted into a circle by hand, either by holding it between the two hands or by placing it on an upturned plate or other flat surface.

In Maharashtra, a multi-grain flatbread called "thalipeeth" is also prepared. It contains many grains and cereals like wheat, rice, bajra, jowar, ragi, horse gram, green gram, black gram, chickpeas and so on. Each grain or cereal is roasted separately and then milled together into a fine powder. Spices and chopped onions are added along with water to make the dough, and it is patted into circles, after which it is roasted on a griddle with some ghee or oil. It is often served with homemade butter.

Indian breads of Central Asian origin, such as naan and tandoori roti, are baked in a tandoor. Naan is usually leavened with yeast.

== Varieties ==
Different varieties of Indian breads include chapati, phulka, puri, roti, bajra rotla, thepla, paratha, naan, kulcha, bhatoora, luchi, puran poli, pathiri, and parotta. Some of these, like paratha and roti, have many varieties. Some varieties depend on the kind of grain used to prepare them, and others depend on the fillings they contain.

- Afghan bread – the national bread of Afghanistan
- Aloo paratha – The bread is filled with mashed potatoes. The potatoes can include different kind of spices.
- Bobbatlu/Bakshalu/Obbattu – made of maida, chanadal/ toor dal, sugar/jaggery, from the Telugu / Kannada cuisine, specially prepared for the Ugadi (Lunar New Year) festival in Telugu states and Karnataka
- Batti – usually unleavened bread, but it is often seen served fried with Varan (Dal) and Vangyachi Bhaji (Eggplant dish), famous in Khandesh, Vidharbha, Nimad and in the eastern region of South Gujrat
- Baati – hard, unleavened bread cooked in the desert areas of Rajasthan, and in Madhya Pradesh
- Bafla - hard, ball boiled and then baked in Madhya Pradesh Malwa Region
- Bajre ki roti – This bread is made of pearl millet flour. It can be made as salt bread or sweet bread. For making sweet roti (bread), the dough is mixed with treacle (gur ka mail).
- Bakarkhani
- Bhakri – round flat unleavened bread made mainly using Sorgham bicolr or Pearl millet often used in the cuisine of the state of Maharashtra in India but is also common in western and central India, especially in the states of Rajasthan, Gujarat, Malwa, Goa, and northern Karnataka.
- Bhatoora – fluffy deep-fried leavened bread from North India
- Bhturu - prepared from soft kneaded fermented dough. It is almost like soft bread from inside and crisp outside. It is served with local delicacies of Himachli Dham like Madra, Dal and Khatta etc.
- Chakuli - An Odisha staple, prepared from a generous mix of rice and black gram batter, seared in Mustard oil or Ghee. Grated dry/fresh coconut, liquid jaggery, chhenā might be added as well.
- Chapati – unleavened flatbread (also known as roti) from India, Nepal, Bangladesh and Pakistan which is baked on a hot surface. It is a common staple food in India
- Cheela – crepes made from batter of varying ingredients in North India - ingredients usually include pulse (dal) flour, Chickpea flour, wheat flour and sometimes finely chopped vegetables.
- Chikkolee – spicy wheat dish common in southern Andhra Pradesh and parts of Maharashtra.
- Chhilka roti - a bread from Jharkhand prepared using rice flour and chana daal.
- Charolia - a thin, pancake-like bread made by spreading a batter on a hot pan in a pattern to make net like shape once cooked.
- Chili parotta – essentially a plain parotta shredded into small, bite-sized pieces mixed with sauteed onions, tomatoes, and chili powder
- Dhebra – Two different types: one made with pearl millet (bajra) flour, often flavoured with fenugreek leaf (methi). The other is an unleavened jaggery puri, made with jaggery and whole wheat flour.
- Kaak
- Kachori – unleavened deep-fried bread with lentils filling
- Kalonji naan – kalonji seeds mixed with naan flour
- Khakhra – thin crackers made from mat bean, wheat flour and oil
- Kori rotti - A crisp, dry wafers made from boiled rice in the Tulu Nadu region. This name is given to both the bread and the dish that includes Mangalorean chicken curry.
- Kulcha – leavened bread eaten in India and Pakistan, made from maida flour (wheat flour)
- Luchi – deep-fried flatbread from Bengal similar to Puri but made with maida flour instead of atta.
- Manda roti (Rumali roti): Traditional Indian flatbread which is thin like handkerchief and cooked on upturned pot. It was known as Mandaka in ancient India.
- Makki ki roti – made with corn flour
- Naan – oven-baked leavened flatbread
  - Keema naan – naan stuffed with minced meat
  - Butter naan - naan topped with nigella seeds and greased with butter
- Papadum – thin, crisp disc-shaped Indian food typically based on a seasoned dough made from black gram (urad flour), fried or cooked with dry heat
- Paratha – layered or stuffed flatbread from North India - traditionally made from whole wheat flour by baking with oil on a hot surface.
  - Aloo paratha
  - Gobhi paratha
  - Laccha paratha
- Porotta – layered flat bread of Kerala and some parts of Southern India
- Pashti – flatbread prepared with rice flour and pan fried in ghee
- Pathiri – pancake made of rice flour
- Pesaha Appam – unleavened Passover bread made by the Saint Thomas Christians (also known as Syrian Christians or Nasrani) of Kerala, India to be served on Passover night.
- Pesarattu – crepe-like bread that is similar to dosa, made out of mung dal with its origin in Andhra Pradesh.
- Minapa Rotte – Pancakes made of idli batter, originating in Andhra Pradesh.
- Maggiga Rotte Dosa style sour flat bread made with dosa batter mixed with maida and Butter milk with Origin in Andhra Pradesh
- Dibbha Rotte Very thick pancakes made of idli batter, originating in Andhra Pradesh.
- Phitti
- Phulka
- Pitha/Pithe – type of cake made from fermented rice batter, dim sum or bread common in Bengal, Assam and Orissa.
  - Chakuli pitha – From Odisha, thin pancakes made of rice flour and black gram batter. It is similar to a dosa.
  - Til Pitha – dry powdered rice cakes with Sesame seeds and Jaggery filling Assam
  - bhapa pithe from Bengal
  - Patishapta from Bengal
  - Chitoi Pithe from Bengal, Chitau Pitha from Odisha
  - Jhaal Pithe from Bangladesh; Pitha made from fermented rice batter mixed with sliced green chilli and coriander leaves
  - Narikol Pitha dry powdered rice cakes with grated and sweetened coconut filling Assam
  - Arisa Pitha – a traditional sweet deep fried pancake from Odisha. The crispy outer layer surrounds soft insides.
  - Manda Pitha – steamed Pitha from Orissa
  - Kakara Pitha – Odisha
- Poi/Poee – A Goan whole wheat hollow flatbread.
- Poli/Puran Poli – traditional type of sweet flatbread
- Puri – unleavened deep-fried bread
  - Pulla Attu Sour dosas made with mix of Dosa batter and Maida with Origins in Andhra Pradesh
- Radhaballabhi fried flatbread similar to Dalpuri but the filling consists of Urad Dal (Black Lentils) instead of Cholar Dal.
- Ragi dosa – dosa made out of finger millet.
- Roti – most simple and common of all Indian breads. Apart from wheat based roti, several millet based and rice based rotis are made like:
  - Akki rotti
  - Jolada rotti
  - Makki ki roti
  - Ragi rotti– made of ragi (finger millet) flour
  - Rotlo (Bajra roti), a Gujarati staple bread made of millet flour
  - Manda roti
- Sanna – spongy rice cake available at Goa, made from fermented or unfermented Rice batter with or without sweeteners
- Sheermal – saffron-flavored flatbread from Kashmir
- Taftan – leavened bread from Uttar Pradesh
- Tandoori Roti – baked in a clay oven called a tandoor. Thicker than a normal Roti.
- Thalipeeth – savoury multi-grain pancake popular in Maharashtra.
- Kori Rotti – crisp dry wafers (about 1mm thick) made from boiled rice and served along with spicy Chicken curry. Usually available in A4 size packs and very popular bread in Coastal Karnataka.
- Litti - Litti, along with chokha, is a complete meal originated from the Indian subcontinent; and popular in Indian states of Bihar, Jharkhand, parts of Uttar Pradesh as well as Nepalese state of Madhesh. It is a dough ball made up of whole wheat flour and stuffed with Sattu (roasted barley flour) mixed with herbs and spices and then roasted over coal or cow dung cakes or wood then it is tossed with much ghee. Although very often confused with the closely related Baati, it is a completely different dish in terms of taste, texture and preparation. It may be eaten with yogurt, Baigan chokha, Aloo chokha, and papad.
- Tandoor bread – Flatbread
- Thepla - Gujarati chapatti made with whole wheat flour and flavoured with fenugreek leaves and spices.
- Rodga – A traditional dough ball dish from the Vidarbha and Marathwada regions of Maharashtra, made using jowar or bajra flour. The dough is shaped into thick balls and either roasted over an open flame or boiled. It is usually served with potato brinjal curry, thecha (chili chutney), and varan, and is known for its rustic, earthy flavor. Similar in appearance to baati but distinct in preparation and regional roots.

== Gallery ==
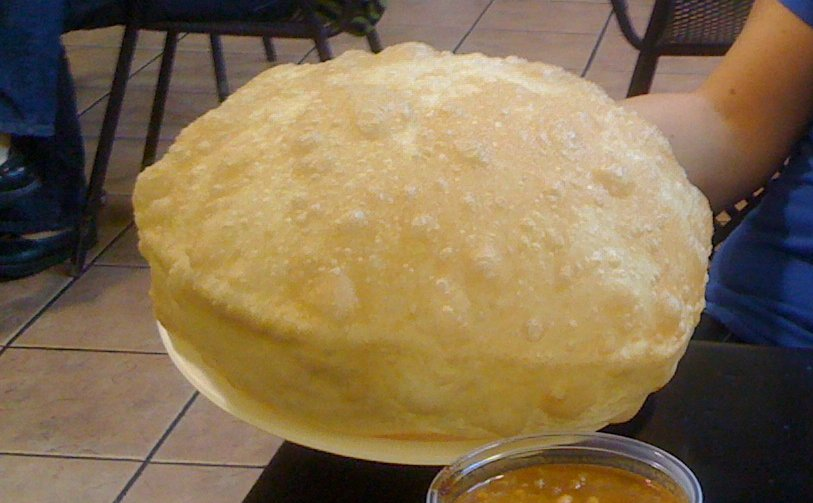
Bhatura

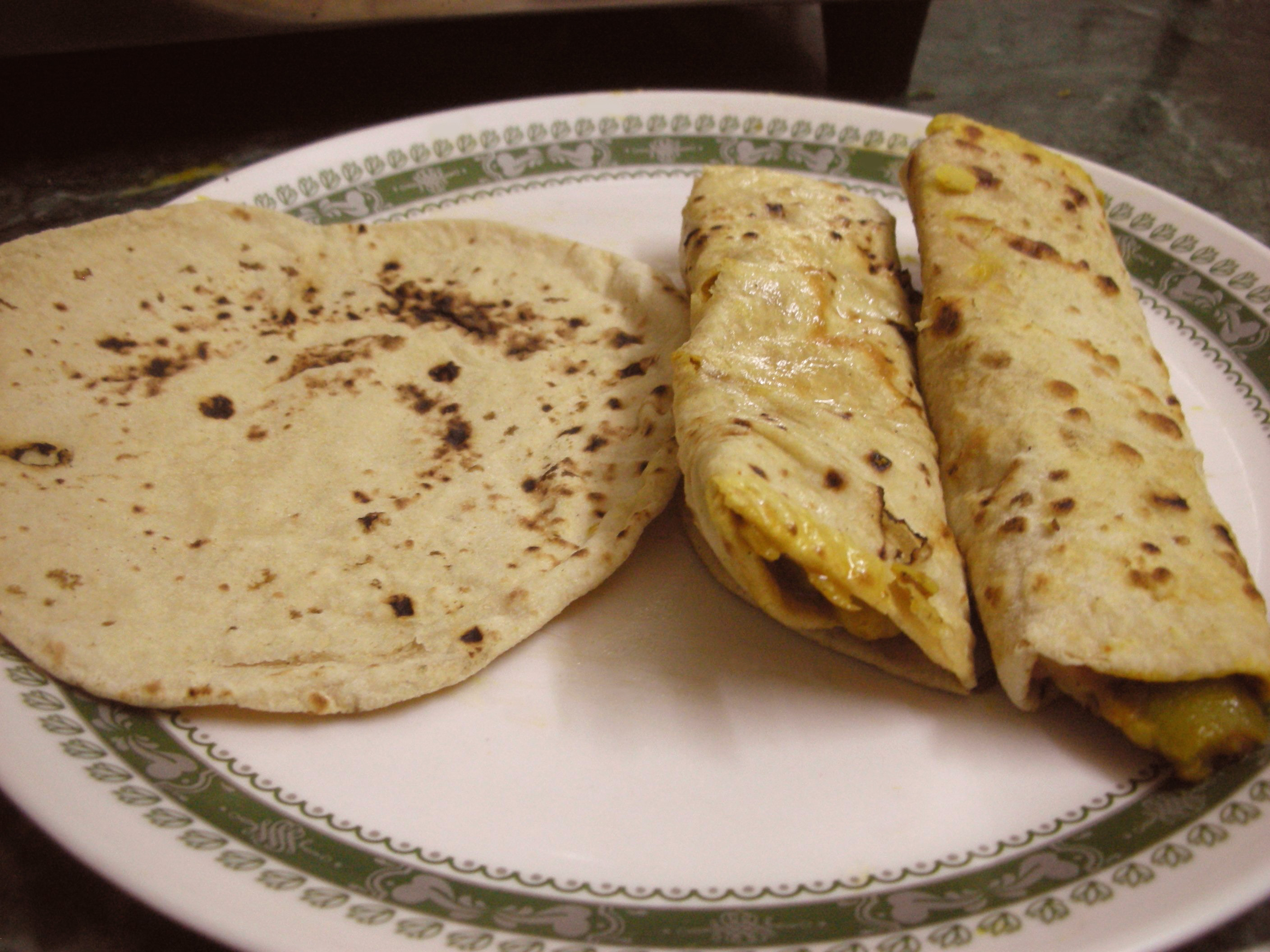
Chapati (roti)

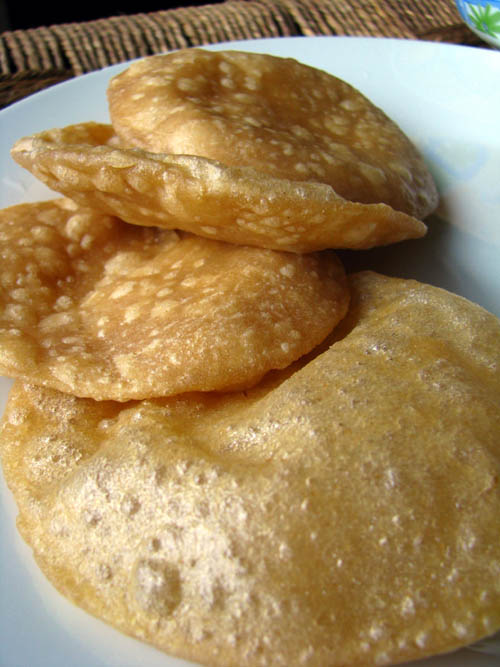
Luchi

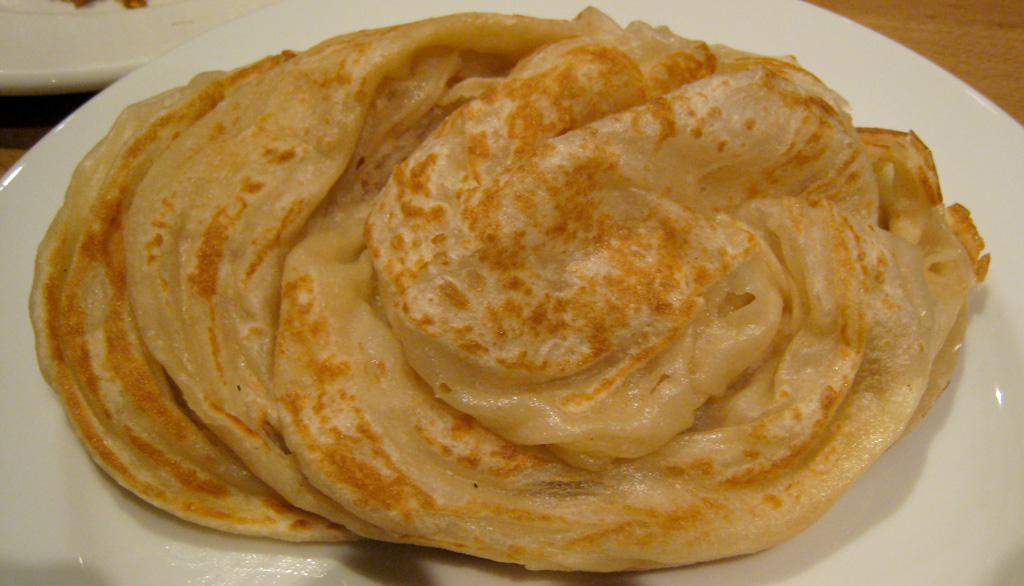
Parotta

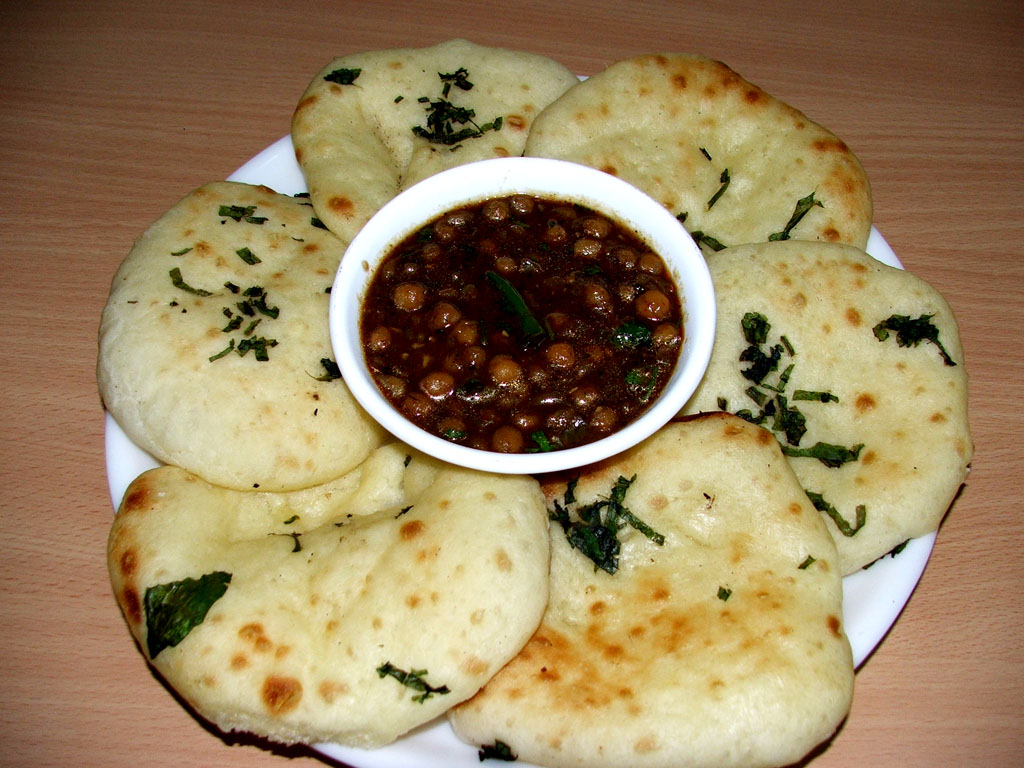
Kulchas with choley

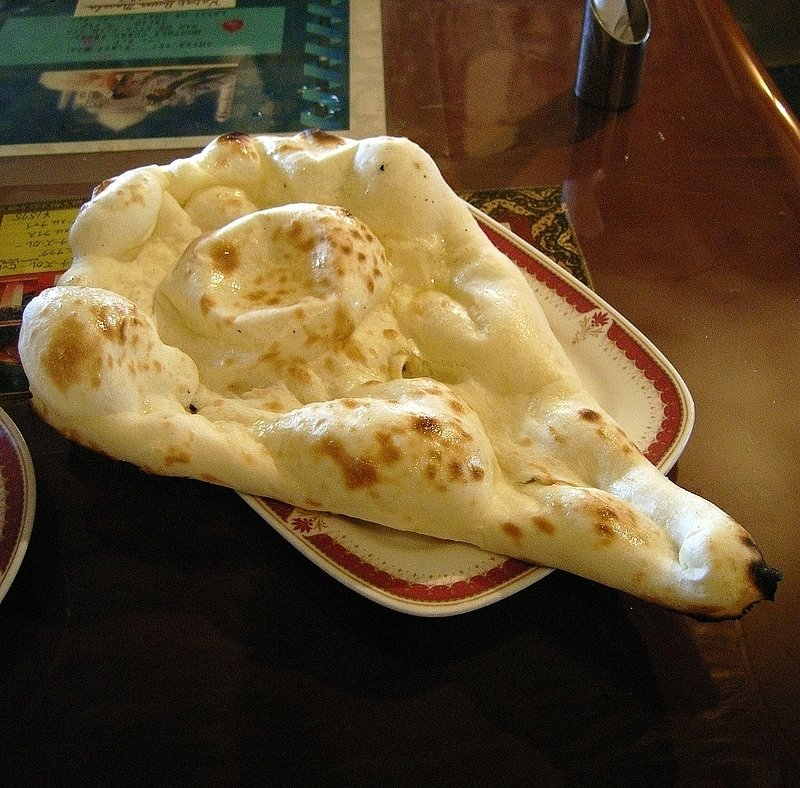
Naan

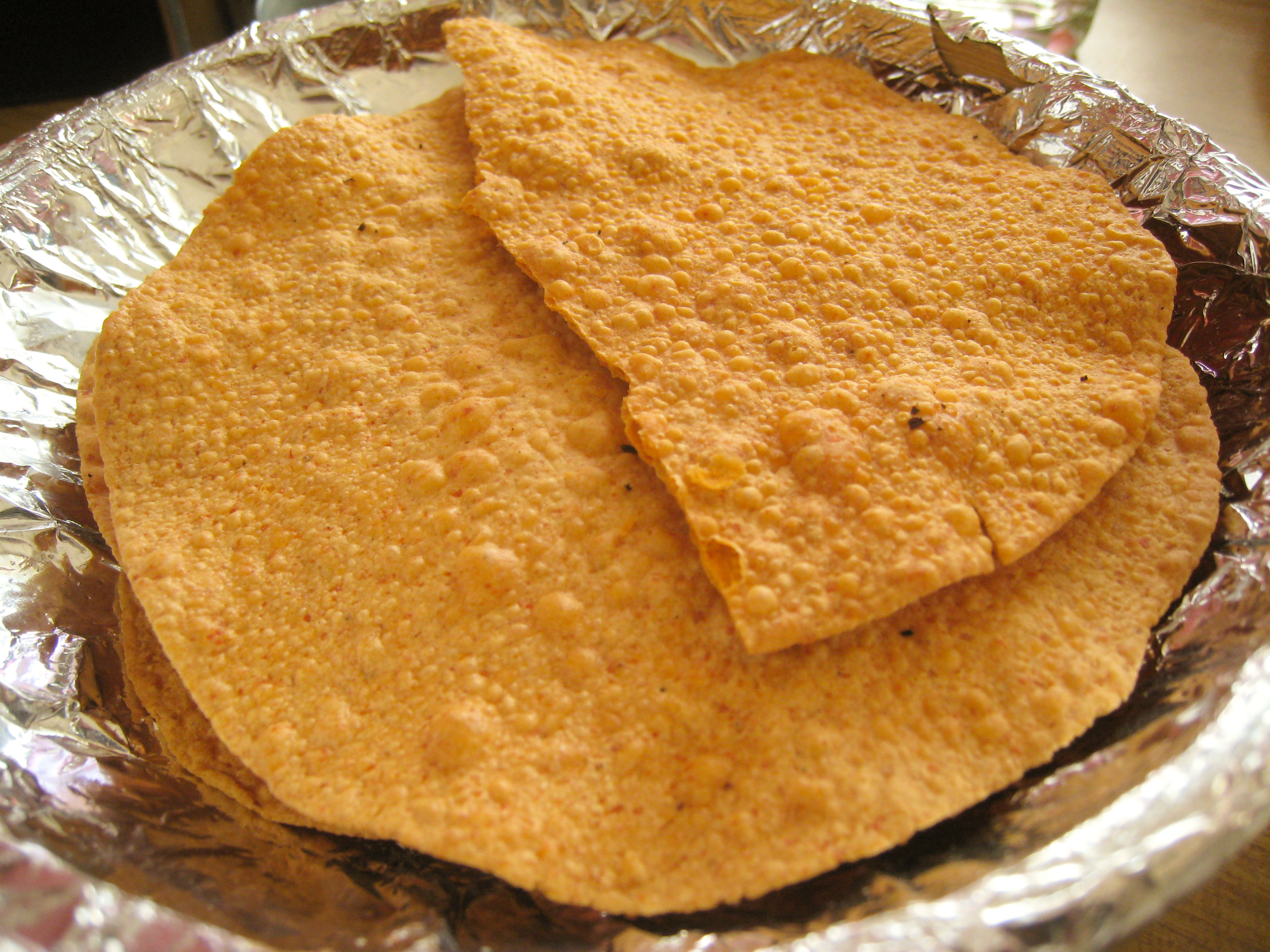
Papadum

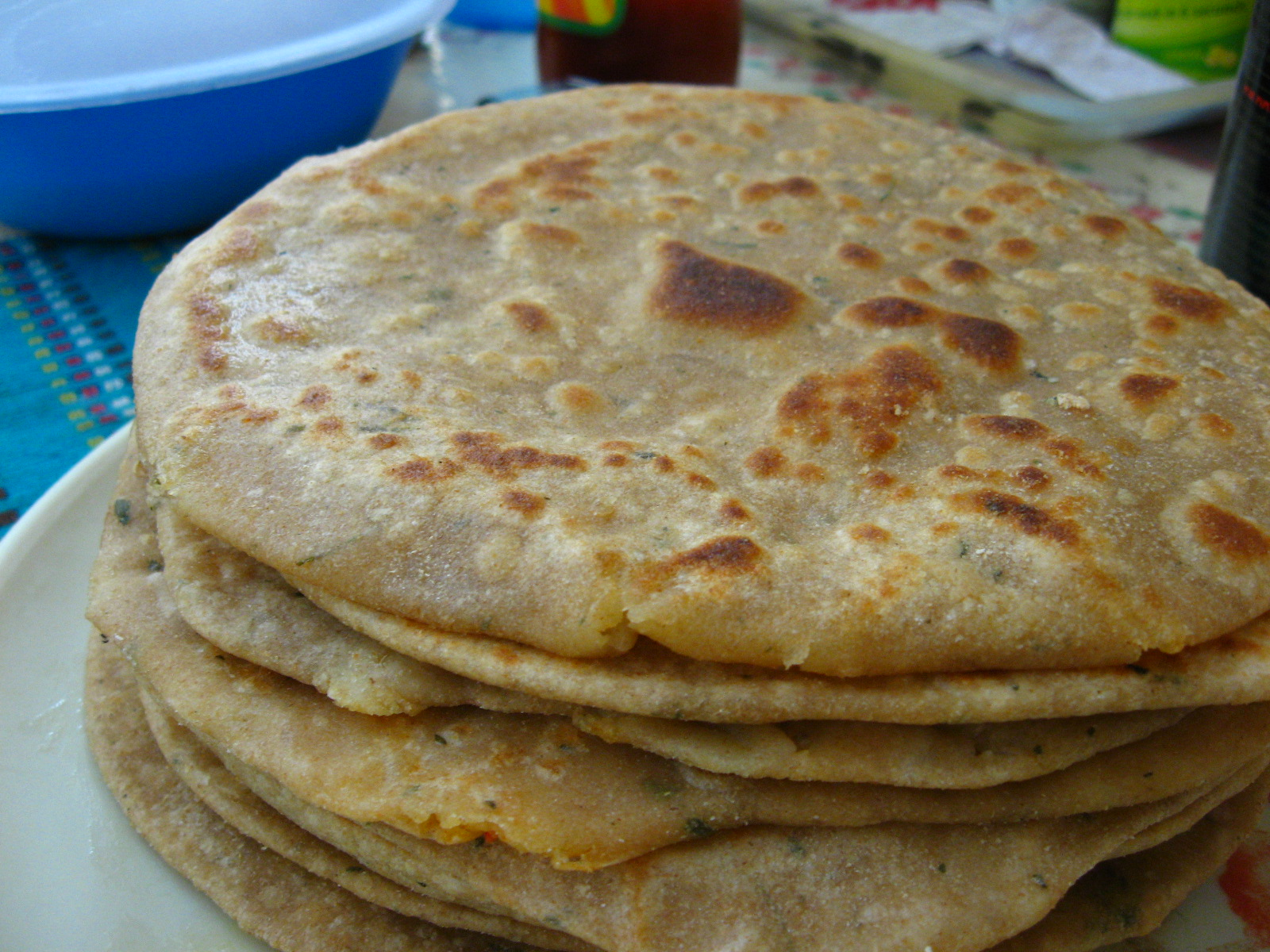
Paratha

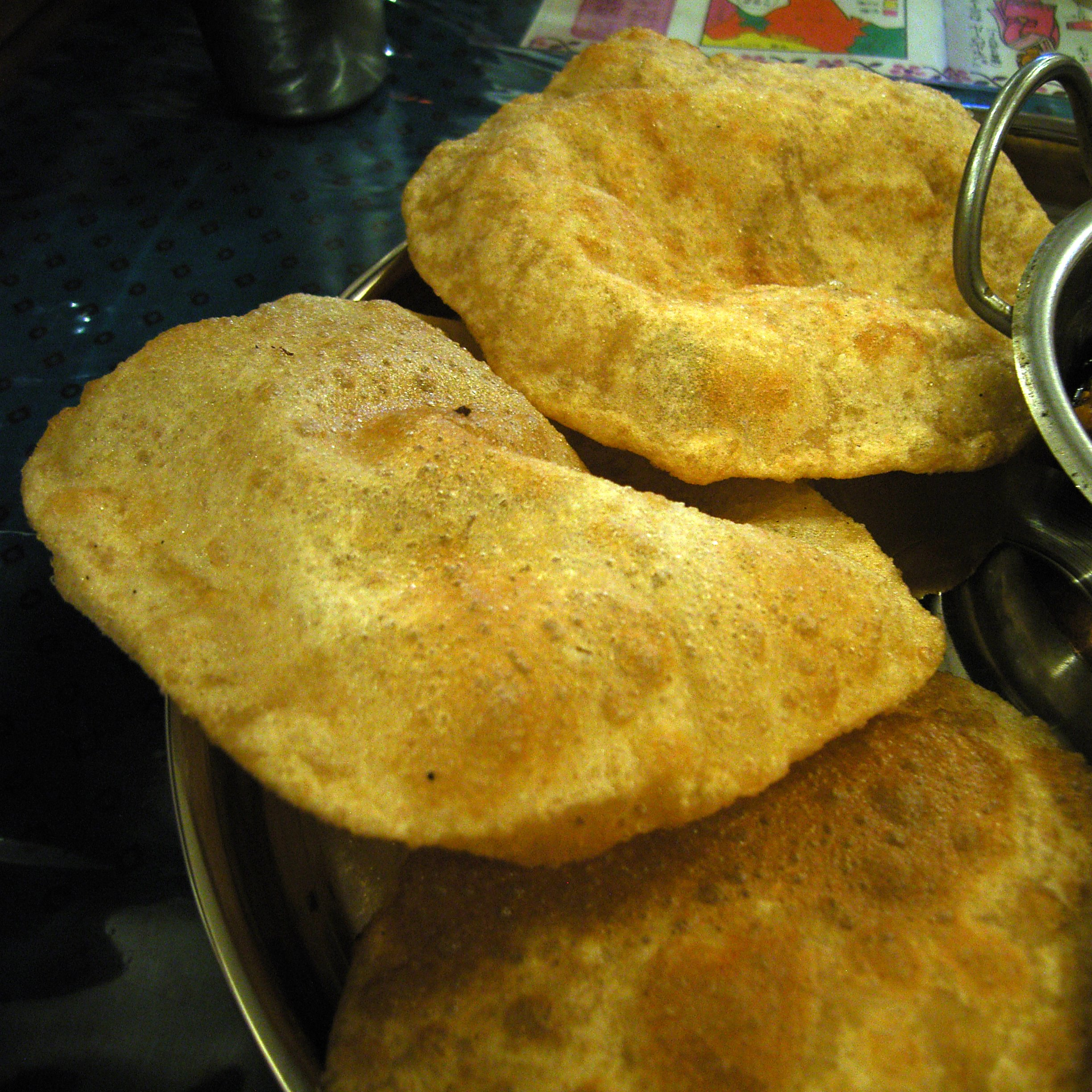
Puri

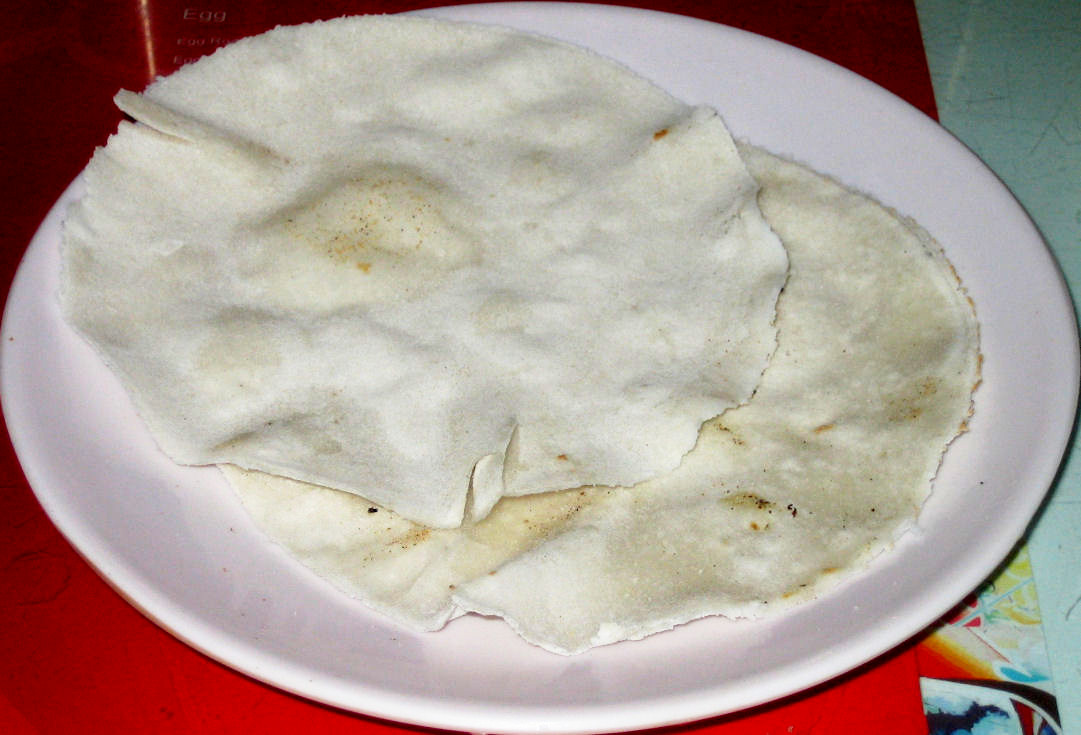
Pathiri

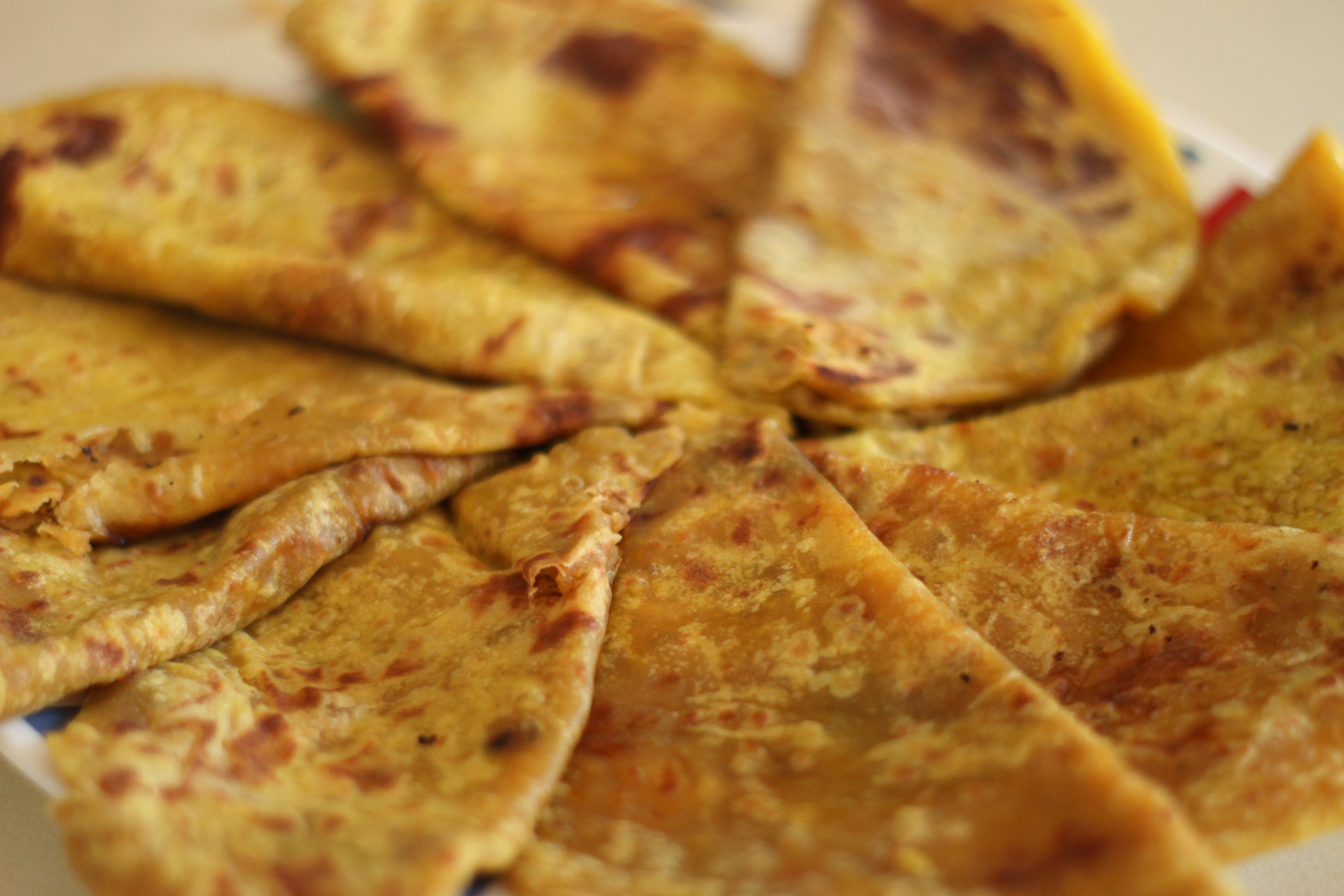
Puran poli or holige

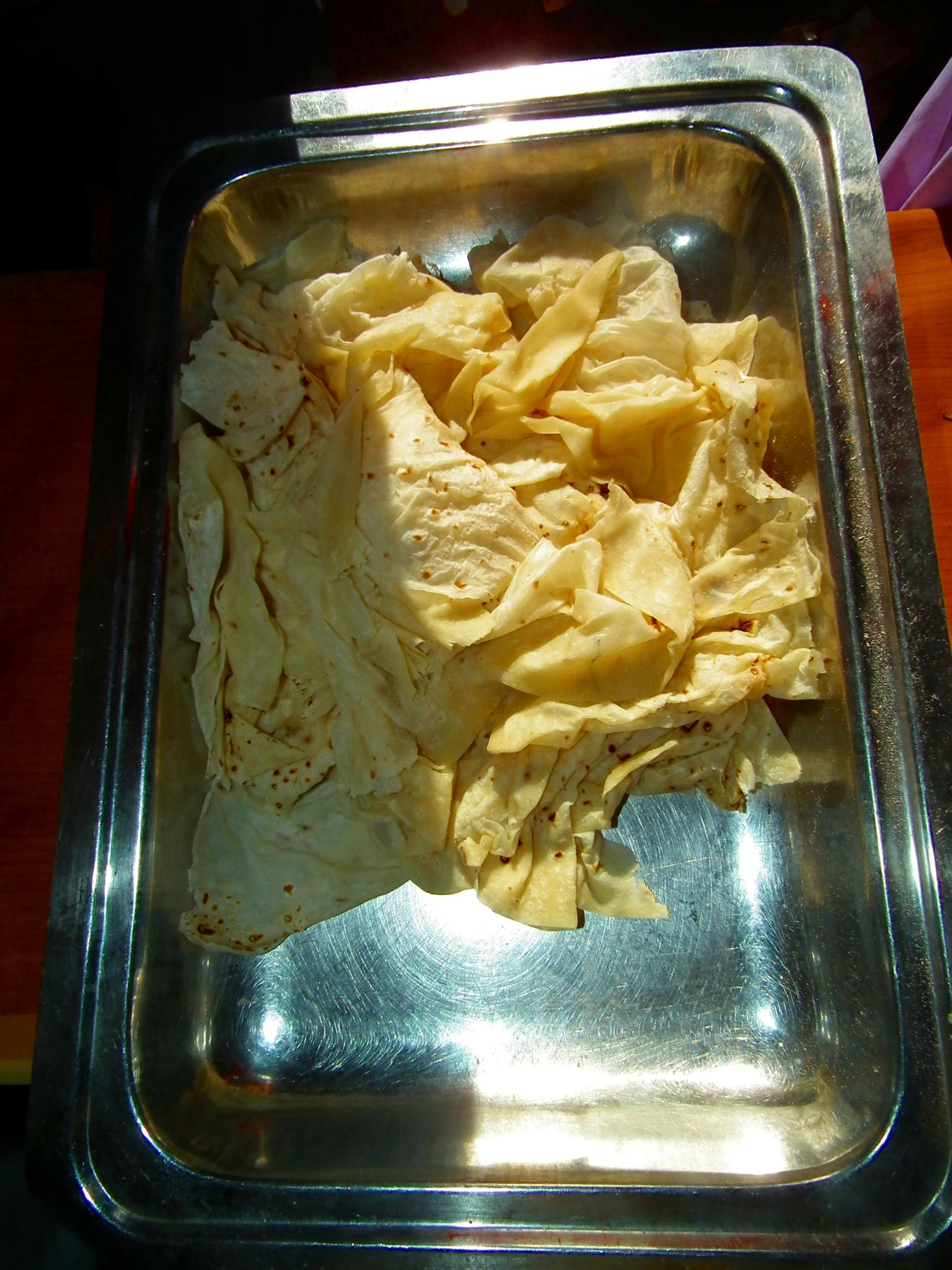
Rumali roti

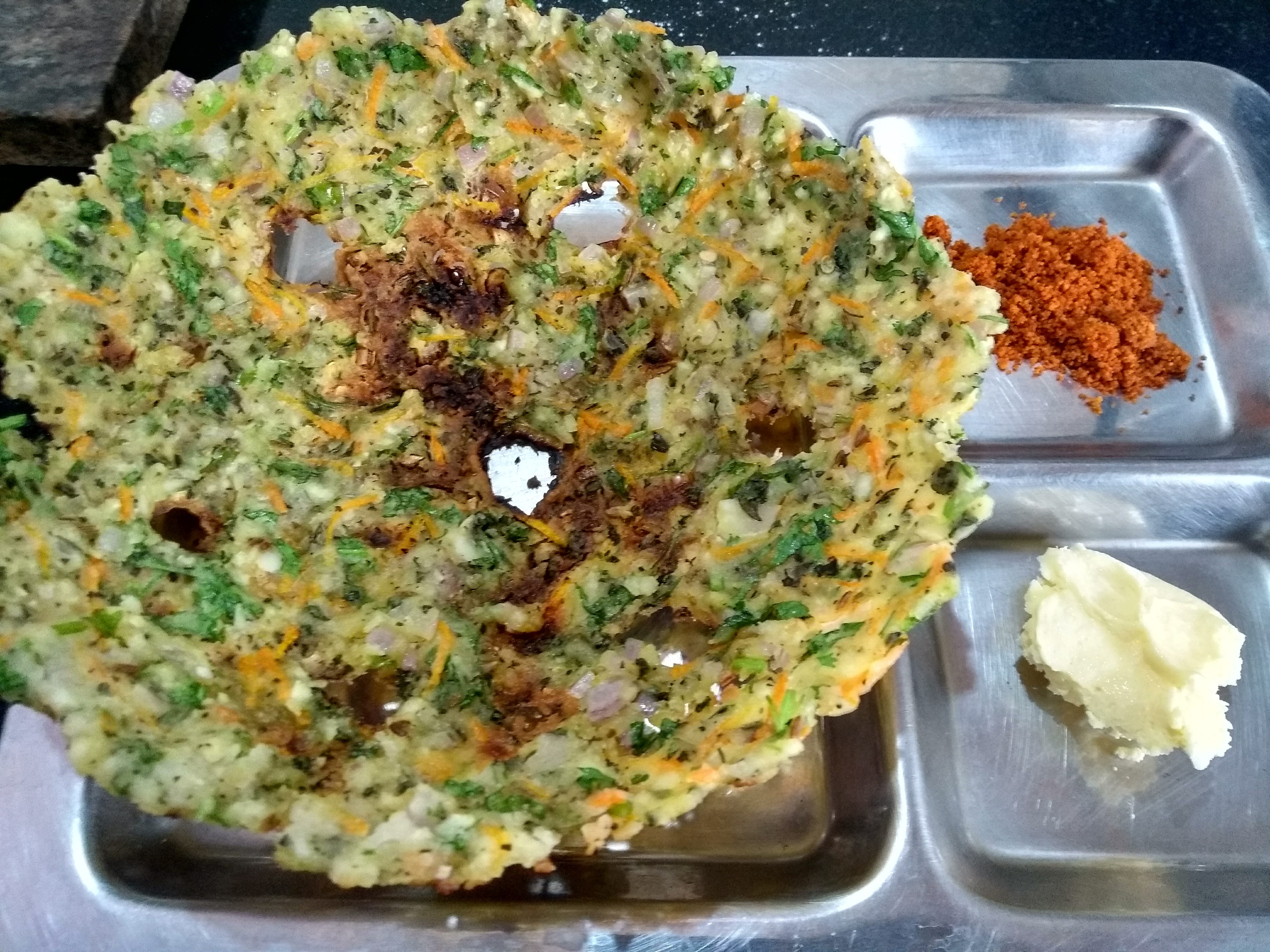
Akki rotti

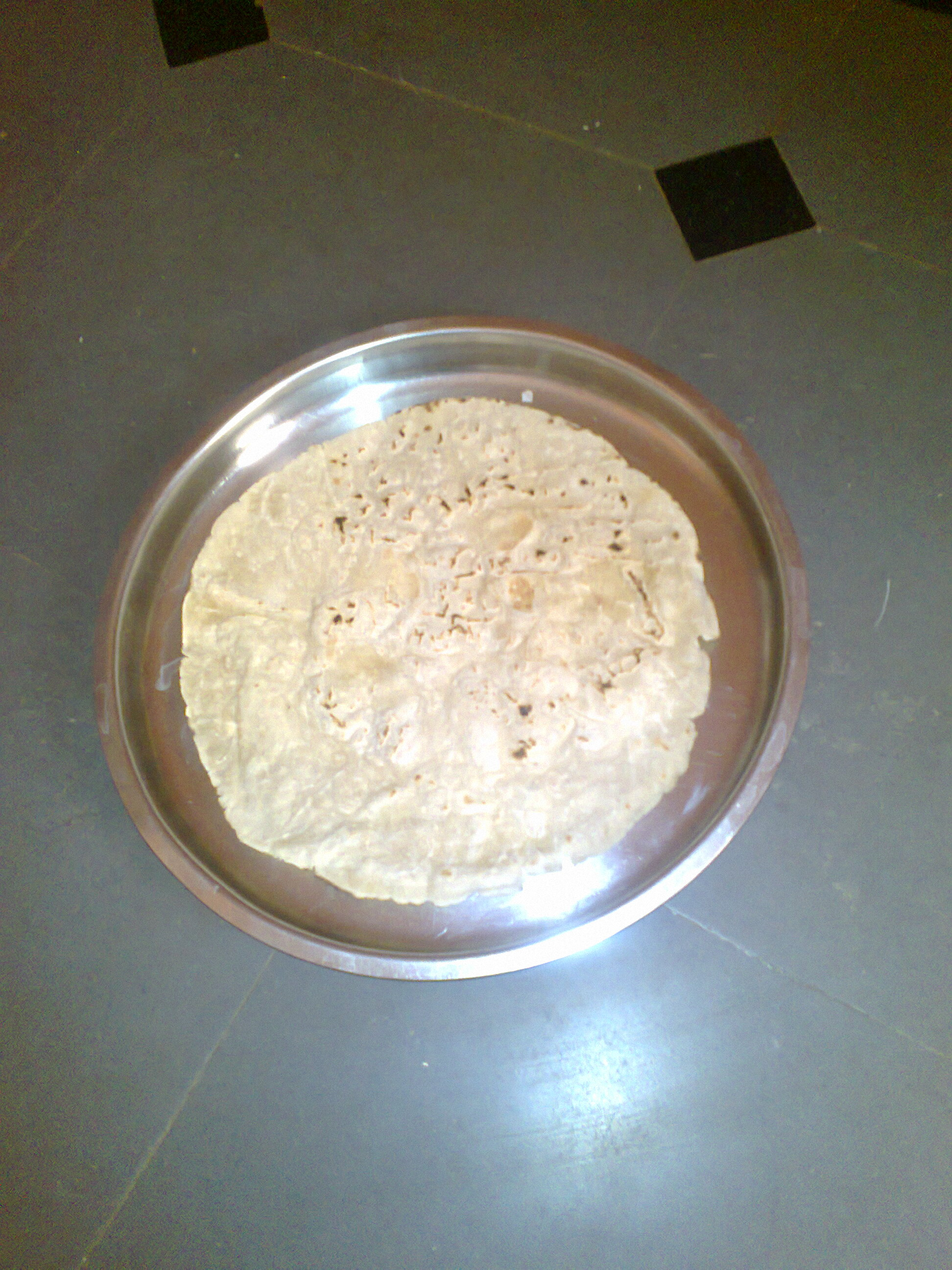
Jolada rotti

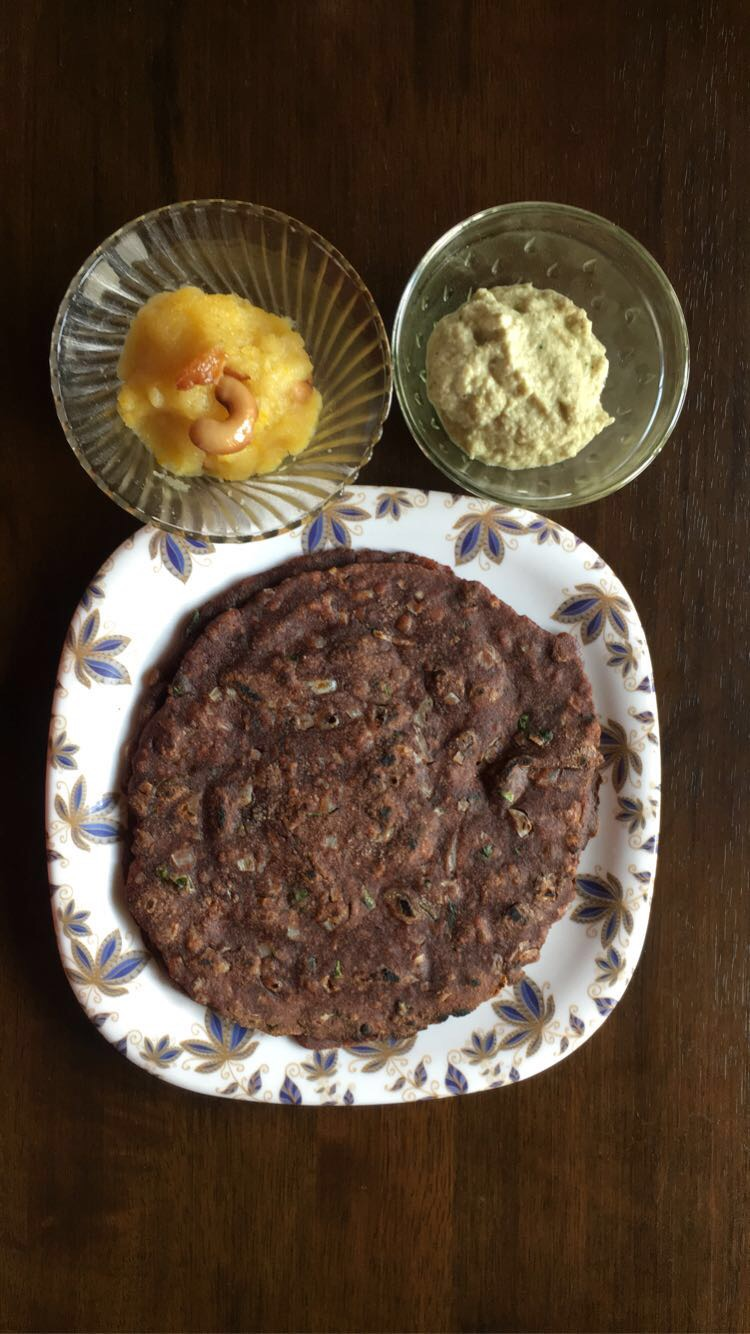
Ragi rotti

== See also ==
- List of Indian dishes
- Culture of India
- Indian cuisine
- Chili parotha
- List of baked goods
- List of breads
- List of Pakistani spices
- List of Pakistani condiments
- Lists of prepared foods
