= Srinivas Saradgi =

Srinivas Saradagi (Saradgi)
- Village/gram panchayat
- Country: India
- State: Karnataka
- District: Gulbarga
- Talukas: Gulbarga

Area
  - Total: 6 km^{2} (2.3 sq mi)

Population (2011)
  - Total: 9,658
  - Density: 1,600/km^{2} (4,200/sq mi)

Languages
  - Official: Kannada
- Time zone: UTC+5:30 (IST)
- Postal code: 585286
- Telephone code: 91(8472)
- Vehicle registration: KA-32 (Gulbarga)

Srinivas Saradagi is a village in the southern state of Karnataka, India. It is located in the Gulbarga taluk of Kalaburagi district in Karnataka.

== History ==
The recorded history of Srinivas Saradagi dates back to the 6th century. The Rashtrakutas gained control over the area, but the Chalukyas regained their domain within a short period and reigned supreme for over two hundred years. The Kalaharis who succeeded them ruled until the 12th century. Around the end of the 12th century, the Yadavas of Devagiri and the Hoysalas of Dwarasamadra destroyed the supremacy of the Chalukyas and Kalachuris of Kalyani. Around the same period, the Kakatiya kings of Warangal came into prominence and the present Kalaburagi and Raichur districts formed part of their domain. The Kakatiya power was subdued in 1321 and the entire Deccan, including the Srinivas Saradagi, passed under the control of the Delhi Sultanate.

The revolt of the officers appointed from Delhi resulted in the founding of the Bahmani Sultanate in 1347 by Zafar Khan Hasan Gangu, who chose Gulbarga (called Ahasanabad during this period) to be the capital. When the Bahmani dynasty came to an end in 1428, the kingdom broke up into five independent sultanates, Bijapur, Bidar, Berar, Ahmednager, and Golconda. The present Srinivas Saradgi came partly under Bidar and partly under Bijapur. The last of these sultanates, Golconda, finally fell to Aurangzeb in 1687.

With the conquest of the Deccan by Aurangezeb in the 17th century, Srinivas Saradagi passed under the Mughal Empire. In the early part of the 18th century, with the decline of the Mughal Empire, Asaf Jha, one of Aurangzeb's generals, formed Hyderabad State, in which a major part of the Gulbarga area was also included. In 1948, Hyderabad State became a part of the Indian Union, and in 1956, excluding two talukas which were annexed to Andhra Pradesh, Gulbarga district, became part of new the state of Mysore.

== Demographics ==
As of 2011 India census, Srinivas Saradagi had a population of 9658 with 5012 males and 4646 females.

== Places ==
Places of religious importance in Srinivas Saradagi include the Dr.B R Ambedkar Bhavan and statue, Sharanabasaveshwar Temple, Majid Hanuman Temple, Kolhapur Mahalaxmi Temple, Srinivasa Temple and Addadari Basavanna Temple outside the village. Devotees from all over the District visit these places of worship every year.

== Cuisine ==
Jolada rotti or jowari roti is a staple of the diet in the region. It is prepared from jowar flour (Sorghum bicolor). Jolada rotti is served with traditional curries, especially brinjal curry, and spiced groundnut powder and yogurt. Generally, the food in Srinivas Saradagis is considered very spicy when compared with the rest of the state.

Hoorana holige is a variant of puran poli of Maharashtra. This specialty sweet is found only in Srinivas Saradagi and is prepared for festivals. It is a kind of stuffed pancake. Chickpeas and jaggery are ground and stuffed into wheat flour and then cooked. This is served with mango pulp as a side dish.

== Climate ==
Climate data for Srinivas Saradgi
Month	Jan	Feb	Mar	Apr	May	Jun	Jul	Aug	Sep	Oct	Nov	Dec	Year
Mean daily maximum °C (°F)	28 (82)	31 (88)	39 (102)	43 (109)	43 (109)	39 (102)	32 (90)	33 (91)	38 (100)	36 (97)	34 (93)	28 (82)	35 (95)
Mean daily minimum °C (°F)	22 (72)	23 (73)	32 (90)	32.5 (90.5)	32 (90)	29 (84)	29 (84)	28 (82)	26 (79)	26 (79)	25 (77)	22 (72)	27.2 (81.0)
Average precipitation mm (inches)	3 (0.1)	3 (0.1)	5 (0.2)	2 (0.1)	18 (0.7)	45 (1.8)	62 (2.4)	46 (1.8)	58 (2.3)	63 (2.5)	43 (1.7)	13 (0.5)	1,023 (40.3)

In summer (April and May), the temperature can rise to 43 °C at Srinivas Saradagi.

== Education ==
Srinivas Saradagi is an important center for high school education. Government High School is the oldest education institution. It was started by the state in 1949. There is a pre-university college on the same premises. There was also a private school run by Mahalaxmi Education Trust but it is no longer open. There are nine primary schools in the gram panchayat.

== Transportation ==
=== By road ===
From the District Headquarter in Gulbarga, Srinivas Saradagi can be reached by road. KKRTC, the Kalyana Karnataka Road Transport Corporation, runs buses from Gulbarga super market bus station hourly. Srinivas Saradagi is around 15 km (9 mi) by road from Gulbarga. From Gulbarga side, Srinivas Saradagi is accessible by bus, car or auto rickshaw.
