= Pathiri =

Indian food

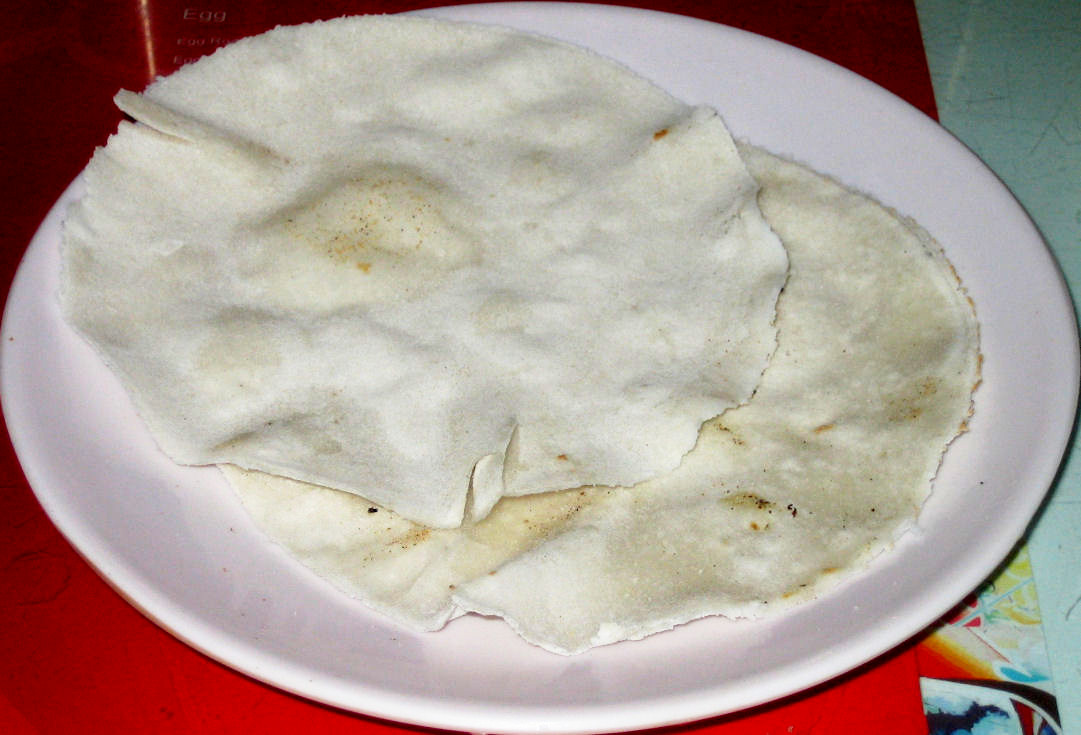
- Pathiri
- Alternative names: Arippathil, Pathil
- Place of origin: India
- Region or state: Kerala
- Main ingredients: Rice flour
- Variations: Neypathiri, poricha pathiri, meen pathiri, irachi pathiri

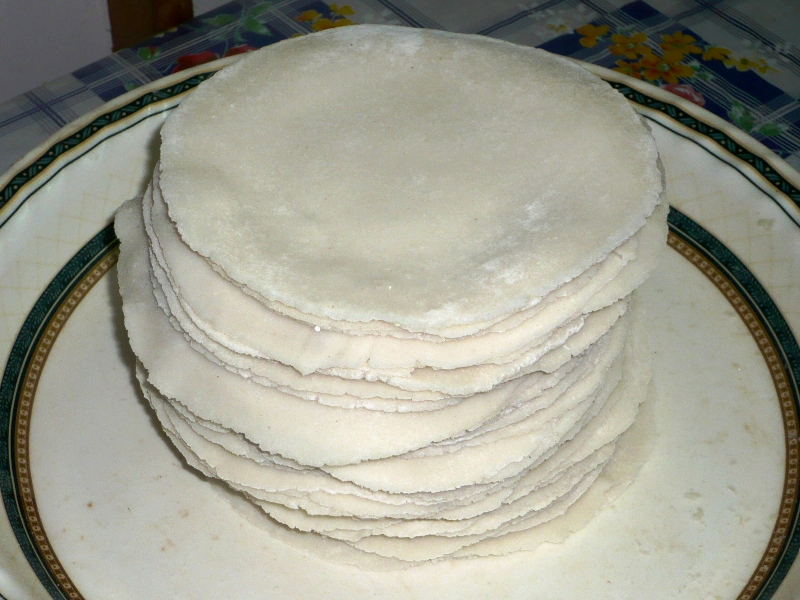
A stack of pathiri

Pathiri (Malayalam: പത്തിരി, [pɐtː̪iɾi]) is a pancake made of rice flour. It is part of the local cuisine among the Mappilas of Malabar region in Kerala State of Southern India. Pathiri is a popular dish among the Muslims in Kerala.

== Etymology ==
The word Pathiri (പത്തിരി) is commonly said to derive from Arabic faṭīra (فطيرة), meaning “pastry” or “flatbread.” The name reflects centuries of Arab–Malabar contact, though the proposed derivation is generally presented as a likely connection rather than a firmly established linguistic history.

== Origin ==
Pathiri belongs to the Mappila cuisine of the Malabar coast, made through centuries of contact with Arab traders who stayed in the region during long trading voyages. The name is commonly linked to the Arabic fateer, a flatbread, and the dish is thought to have adapted that form to local ingredients by using rice flour in place of wheat, as rice was more readily available in Malabar. During Ramadan it is a staple of the iftar meal.

== Preparation ==
Pathiri is made by kneading rice flour with hot salted water into a soft dough, dividing it into small balls, and rolling each one out into a thin disc. The discs are cooked on a hot griddle until they puff up, and are often eaten with meat or fish curries and with coconut milk.

== Varieties ==
Neypathiri, fried variety of pathiri.

Irachi Pathiri, meat-stuffed variety, stacked in a tea stall.

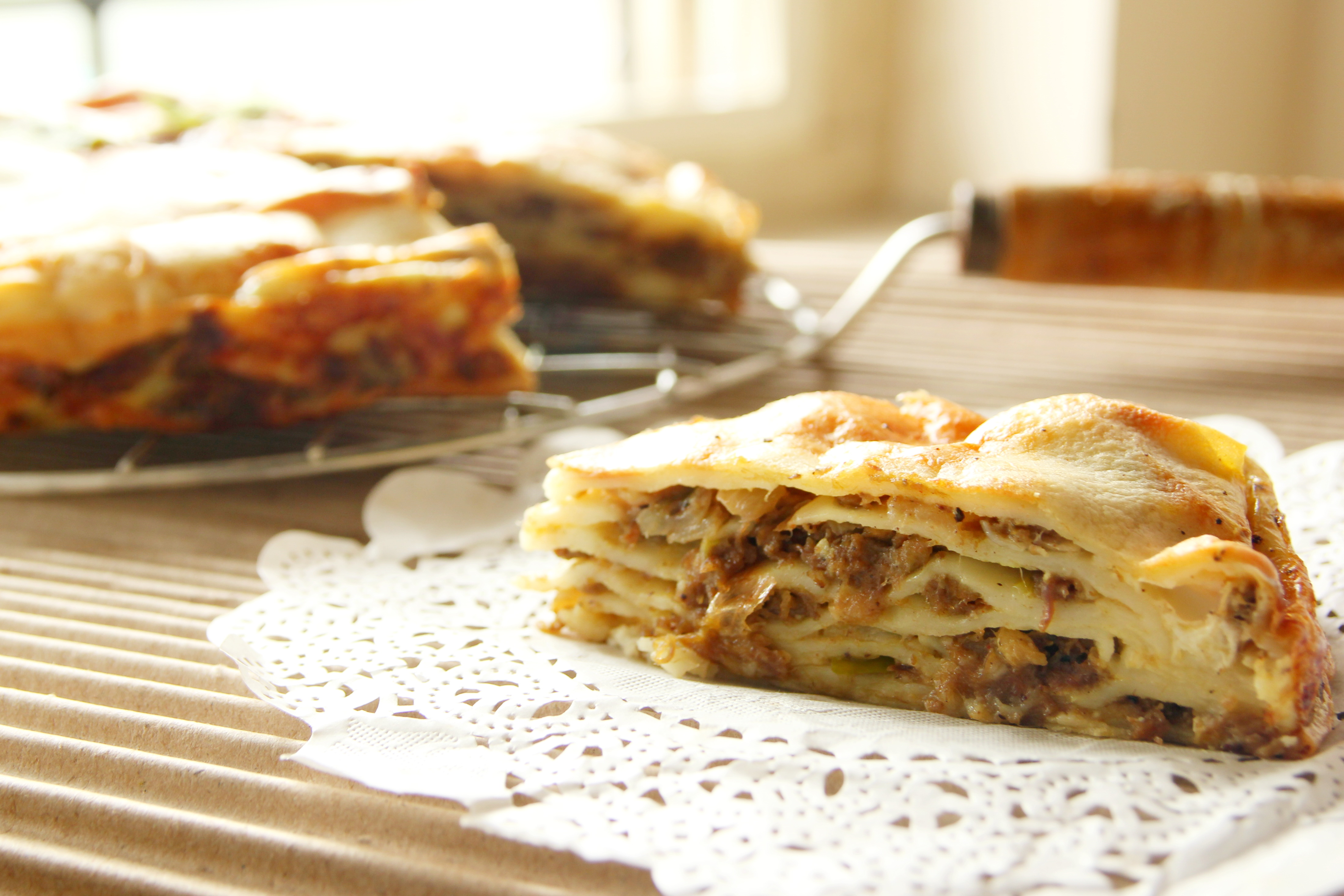
A slice of Chatti Pathiri, the baked and layered variety.

Pathiri is made in many forms across Malabar. Neypathiri is fried in oil (usually, coconut oil or palm olein). Meen Pathiri and Irachi Pathiri are stuffed varieties having fish and meat fillings respectively. Baked and layered versions include Chatti Pathiri. A thicker type, wrapped in a plantain leaf and eaten with coconut milk and sugar, is called Pathal (പത്തൽ) or Orotti (ഒറോട്ടി).

== See also ==
- Kinnathappam
- Kalathappam
- Alsa
- Pashti
- Cuisine of Kerala
- Arab Influence on Kerala: Malik ibn Dinar
- List of Indian breads
