= Chikkolee =

- Type: Bread
- Place of origin: India
- Region or state: Andhra Pradesh
- Main ingredients: Wheat flour, salt, water, ginger paste, tamarind slices, masala

Chikkolee is a spicy wheat dish common in southern Andhra Pradesh and parts of Maharashtra. It is made in a manner similar to roti (chapathi) after it is cut into pieces and served with the addition of spices. This is a traditional pudding of Rangrez, Bhavasara Kshatriya. It is a semi-liquid with crushed wheat, and meat pieces may be added. It can also be served as a snack.

== Ingredients ==
It consists of wheat flour, salt, water, ginger paste, tamarind slices, and masala.

== See also ==
- List of Indian breads
