= Akki rotti =

Indian rice flour flatbread

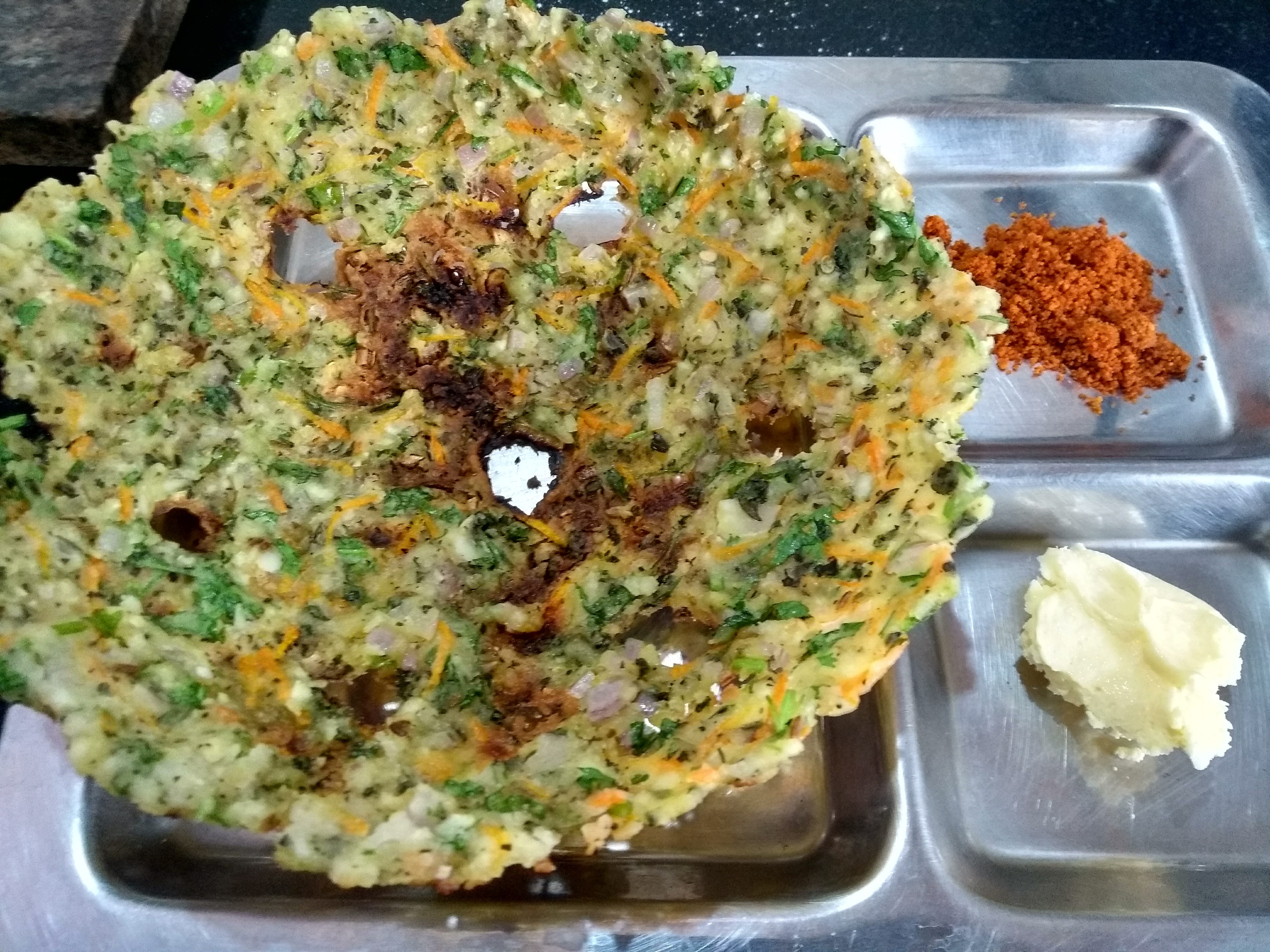
- Akki rotti with chutney powder and butter
- Place of origin: India
- Region or state: Karnataka
- Serving temperature: Hot
- Main ingredients: Rice flour, water

Akki rotti or akki roti is an Indian flatbread made from rice flour. It is part of Karnataka cuisine.

== Versions ==
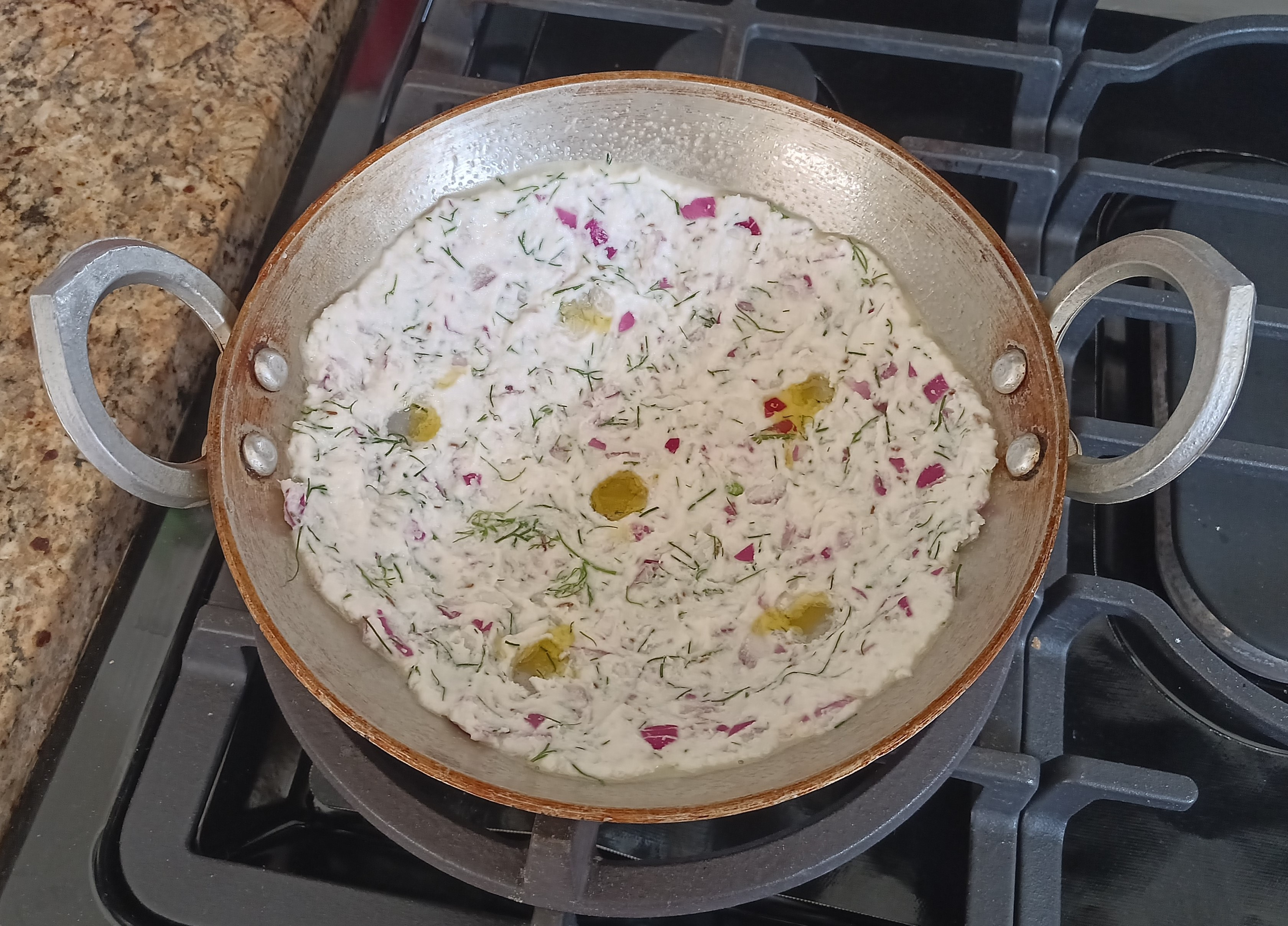
Akki roti cooking on a tava

Akki roti has at least two versions. The most common version is similar to the Maharashtrian flatbread thalipeeth. In this version, rice flour is mixed with onions or grated carrots and green chillies. The resulting dough is flattened on a tava or banana leaf and roasted on a stovetop. The cooked akki roti is served with unsalted butter, chutney, or pickle. In contrast with thalipeeth, akki roti has a chewy texture.

The second version is from Kodagu (a district in southern Karnataka) and is similar to the Indian flatbread bhakri. In this version, cooked rice, rice flour and salt are mixed, resulting in a soft dough. The dough is flattened and cooked on a tava. It is then roasted on an open flame, which chars its edges. The cooked Kodagu akki rotti is served with butter or ghee and curry.

Akki roti is also similar to the Malabar rice flour pancake pathiri.

== See also ==
- Cuisine of Karnataka
- List of Indian breads
- List of rice dishes
