= Thecha =

Indian spicy condiment

Thecha is a spicy condiment prepared in the state of Maharashtra in India. It has many variants but the primary ingredients are chili peppers (green or red), peanuts and garlic, often tempered in oil (generally peanut) and a multitude of spices such as cumin, sesame seeds, coriander seeds, asafoetida (hing), cloves, coriander leaves and grated coconut seasoning. Many times, the high amount of spice in the thechas leads to people adding oil to reduce the spice. Traditional recipes call for the ingredients to be crushed or pounded in metal or mortar and pestle, but modern kitchens often rely on grinding in food processors.

It is served with dishes like pithla bhakri or is eaten with bhakri along with red onions. A regional variation is the varhadi thecha. It has been described by celebrity chef Sanjeev Kapoor as a popular relish. It spoils after 10 to 15 days.

The 2 popular types of Thechas are Kolhapuri Thecha & Varhadi Thecha.
