= Baingan bharta =

Indian dish, bearing a resemblance to baba ghanoush

Baigan bharta
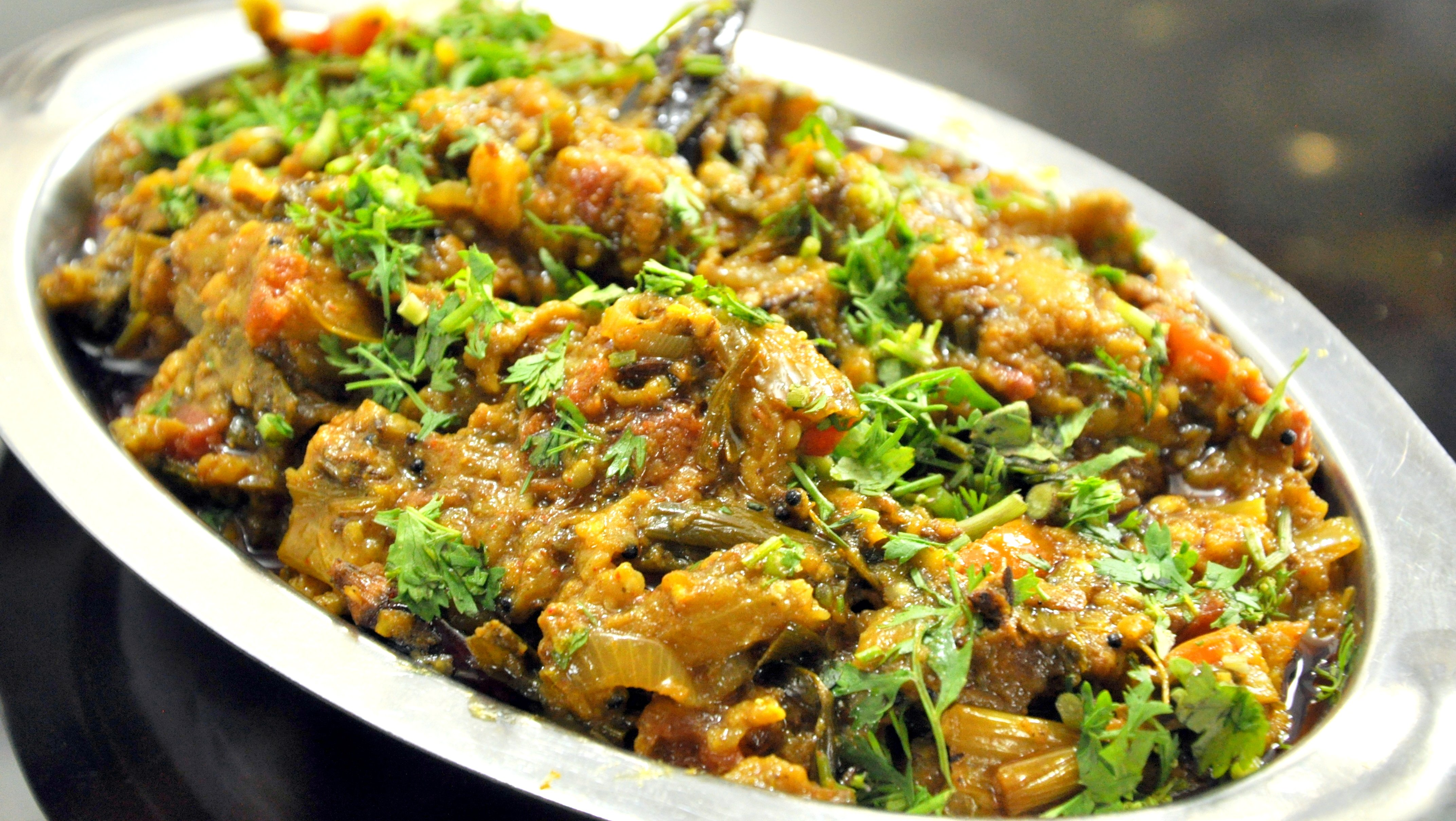
- Baigan bharta
- Alternative names: Begun bhorta Baingan bharta Baingan chokha
- Type: Stew, casserole, curry
- Course: Appetizer, side dish, main course
- Place of origin: South Asia
- Region or state: Indian subcontinent
- Associated cuisine: Indian, Bangladeshi
- Serving temperature: Warm to hot
- Main ingredients: Brinjal, onion, tomato, chili, green peas, cilantro, spices (incl. coriander, cumin, garam masala)

Baigan bharta, also spelled baingan bharta or begun bharta or baigan chokha (mashed eggplant) (Note: Or else: Baigan ka Shahi Bharta or Baigan da Bhartha) is an Indian dish prepared by mashing or mincing grilled brinjal (aubergine in UK English, eggplant in US English, baigan in Hindi) with tomato, onion, herbs and spices, with variations being common from chef to chef. (Note: Bharta means "mash".) Traditionally, cooking the eggplant over charcoal, inside of a tandoor, barbecue grill or oven, or even directly applying flame to the outside of the fruit infuses the dish with a smoky flavour; the blackened skin is then easily peeled and the eggplant may be further prepared.

Baigan bharta is most often grilled, minced brinjal stewed with chopped tomato, browned onion or shallots, ginger, garlic, and cumin, and topped with lime or lemon juice, fresh cilantro (coriander leaves) and sliced fresh green chili pepper. Depending on region and personal tastes, ghee (clarified butter) may be used in preparation of the dish. In some regions where mustard oil is popular, this may be used, though it possesses a powerful flavour and aroma. Most chefs use a neutral, high-smoking-point vegetable oil like canola or sunflower oil. Traditionally, the dish is eaten by hand with flatbread (specifically roti, naan or paratha), and can also be served with a variety of rice dishes, like biryani, khichdi or pulao. The meal will usually be rounded out with various pickles (such as mango, lime, and lemon) as well as raita, a palate-cooling yogurt dish/condiment (similar to Greek tzatziki) with many forms, including mint, mango or cucumber preparations. In Bihar and Uttar Pradesh, it is served hot with litti or baati.

In India, Pakistan and Bangladesh, baigan bharta is part of the most popular cuisine items. In India, it is found in various regional styles, with ingredients varying from one region to another. Some chefs and recipes utilise seasonal mashed pumpkin, squash or sweet potato for added thickness and flavour. The dish has since spread to areas outside of India, particularly countries with high numbers of Indians and their descendants, including the United Kingdom, Australia, and parts of the United States and Canada. It is popularly eaten in the Caribbean, in places like Guyana (as balanjay chokha), Jamaica and Trinidad and Tobago, where it is known as baigan chokha.

== Names ==
The dish has several regional names, such as:

- Hindi- बैगन का भरता (baigan kā bhartā)
- Urdu- بینگن کا بھرتہ (baigan kā bhartā)
- Rajasthani- भटा री बुज्जी/बांटण (bhaṭā ri bujji/bā̃ṭaṇ)
- Punjabi- ਬਤਾਊ ਦਾ ਭੱੜਥਾ (batāu dā bhaṛthā)
- Gujarati- રીંગણનો ઓળો (rĩgaṇ no oḷo)
- Assamese- বেঙেনাৰ পিটিকা (bengenār pitikā)
- Meitei- ꯈꯥꯃꯦꯟ ꯑꯃꯦꯇꯄꯤ (khāmen ametpi)
- Marathi- वांग्याचं भरीत (wā̃gyāchã bharit)
- Boro- फान्थाव बाथोन (pʰan.tʰao ba.tʰwn)
- Kannada- ಬದನೆಕಾಯಿ ಗೊಜ್ಜ (badanekāyi gōjju)
- Telugu- వంకాయ పచ్చడి (vankāya pachchaḍi)
- Tamil- கத்தரி துவயல் (kattiri tuvayal)
- Tulu- ಬದನೆ ಗೊಜ್ಜಿ (badanae gōjji)
- Malayalam- വഴുതന ചമ്മന്തി (vazhutana chammanti)
- Odia- ବାଇଗଣର ଚକଟା (bāigaṇara chakaṭā)
- Bengali- বেগুন ভর্তা (begun bhorta)
- Sylheti- ꠛꠣꠁꠋꠉꠂꠘ ꠌꠣꠐꠘꠤ (baingoin sātni)
- [[Sindhi]]- Ringan jo bhurtho
- Bhojpuri- भाँटा के चोखा (bhā̃ṭā ke chokhā)
- Maithili- ভাঁটাক সন্না (bhā̃ṭāk sannā)
- Kashmiri- وانٛگَن ژیٚٹِنؠ (wangan tsetin)
- Nepali- बैगुनको भर्ता (baigun ko bhartā)

== Variants ==
In Gujarat, it is called ringan no oḷo (Gujarati: રીંગણનો ઓળો), in which the eggplant is roasted, then mashed, and then sautéed with mustard and cumin seeds, turmeric, red chilli powder, ginger and garlic and salt. It is served with bajra no rotlo (Gujarati: બાજરાંનો રોટલો), kadhi (a soup prepared by gram flour, curd and spices), khichadi and chhaash (Gujarati: છાશ) (buttermilk).

In Karnataka, it is called eṇṇegāyi (ಎಣ್ಣೆಗಾಯಿ) and is prepared by boiling and frying a whole eggplant, and is usually served with akki rotti, while the gōjju (ಗೊಜ್ಜು) is just roasting and mashing the seasoned eggplant. In the South Indian state of Tamil Nadu, the Tamils prepare a similar dish called kattirikāi tayir koṭsu (கத்திரிகாய் தயிர் கொட்சு), in which the eggplant is cooked, mashed, and sautéed with mustard, red chilis and sesame oil. The final step in the recipe involves adding yogurt (curds) to the mixture and dressing the dish with coriander leaves.

In the Bhojpuri-speaking regions of India (such as eastern Uttar Pradesh and western Bihar), it is known as Bhāṅṭā ke chokhā (भांटा के चोखा ); it is also popular within the Indo-Caribbean communities of Trinidad and Tobago, Suriname, and Guyana, where many descendants of indentured labourers from northern India live.

In Maharashtra, especially in the northern Khandesh region, vangyache bharit (वांग्याचें भरीत) as they call it is served in social gatherings including wedding ceremonies. During harvest season, a special "bharit party" is organised. Bharit is usually served with puri. In the Vidarbha and Khandesh regions of Maharashtra, two variants are popular: kachha ("raw") bharit and phodni cha (with tadka) bharit. In kachha bharit, all the ingredients except for brinjal are used uncooked. Raw spring onion, tomato, green chillies, green coriander, and sometimes fresh fenugreek leaves are mixed with flame-roasted brinjal along with raw linseed oil or peanut oil. In phodni cha bharit, the above ingredients are first fried in oil with spices; then, mashed brinjals are mixed into it and cooked together. A similar process is followed in other Indian states and Pakistan with slight variations in ingredients. In Vidarbha and Khandesh, it is considered a delicacy when the brinjals are roasted on dried cotton plant stems, a process which gives a distinct smokey flavour to the dish. The dish is served with dal, bhakri, and rice.

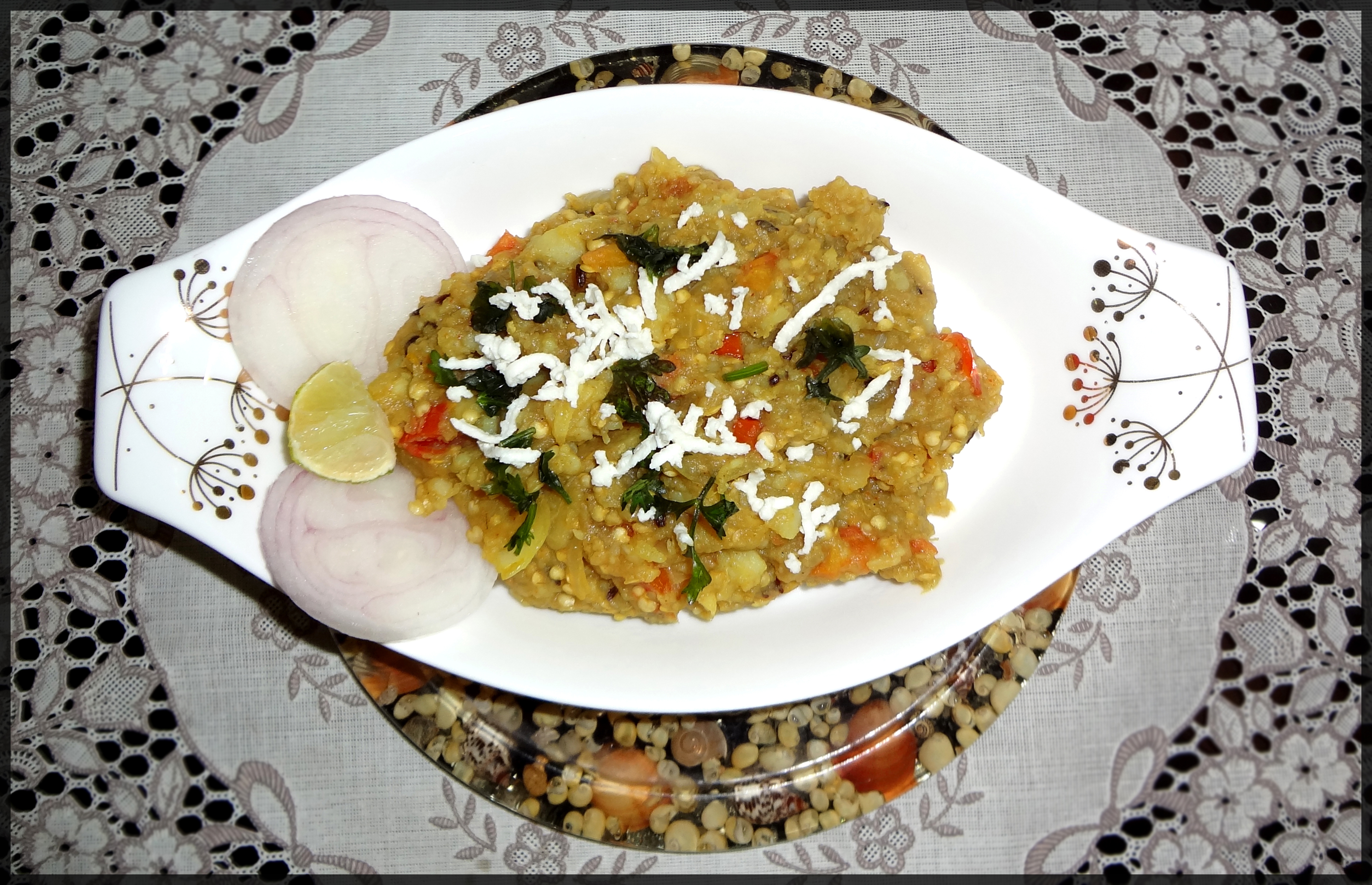

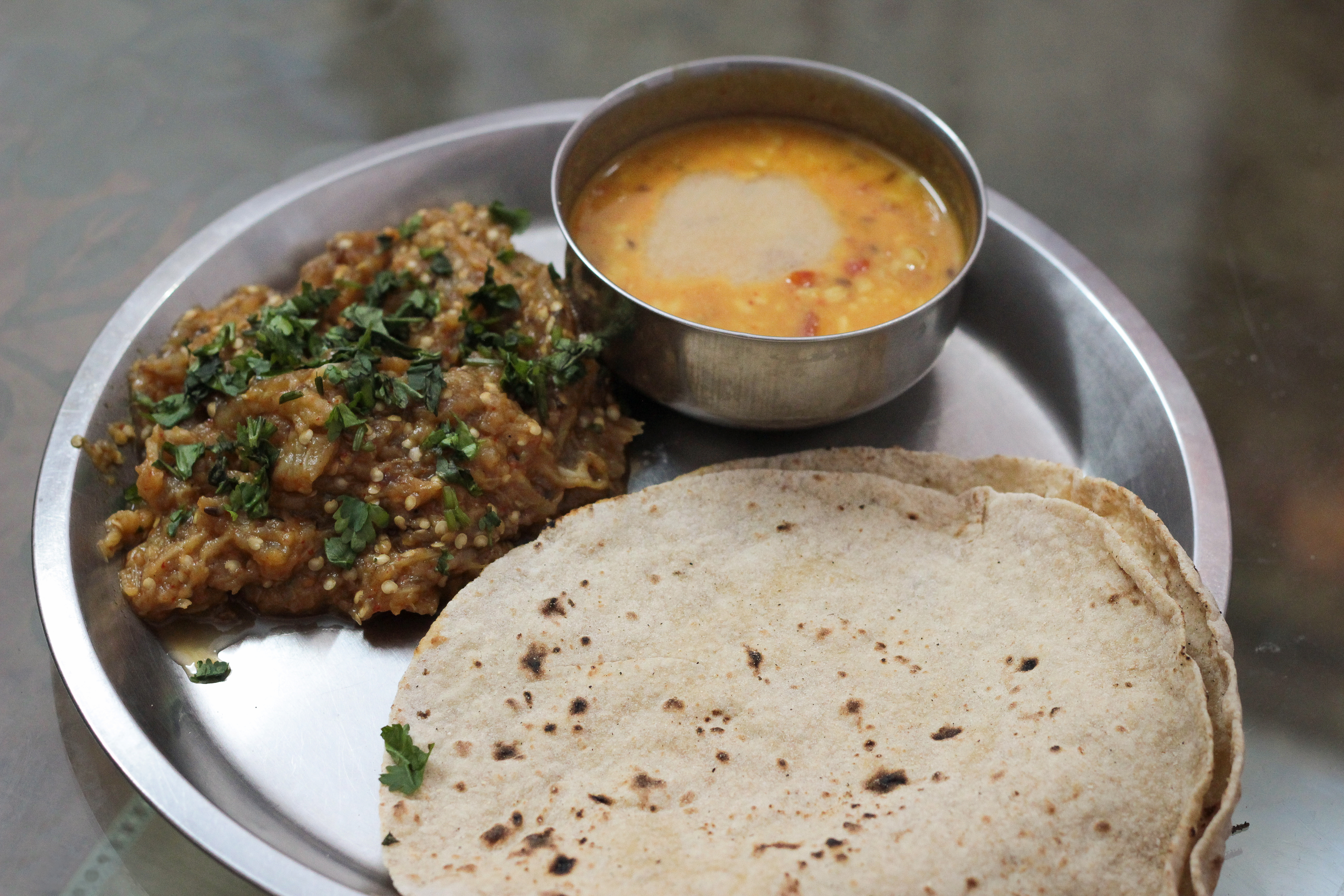
Baigan bharta with roti and lentils

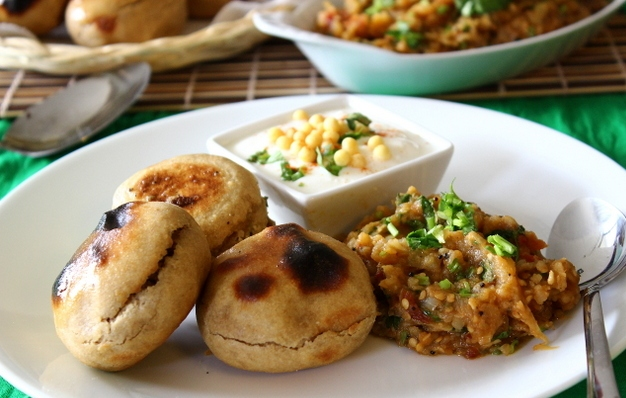
Litti chokha, litti with bhantaa chokha, a Bhojpuri dish

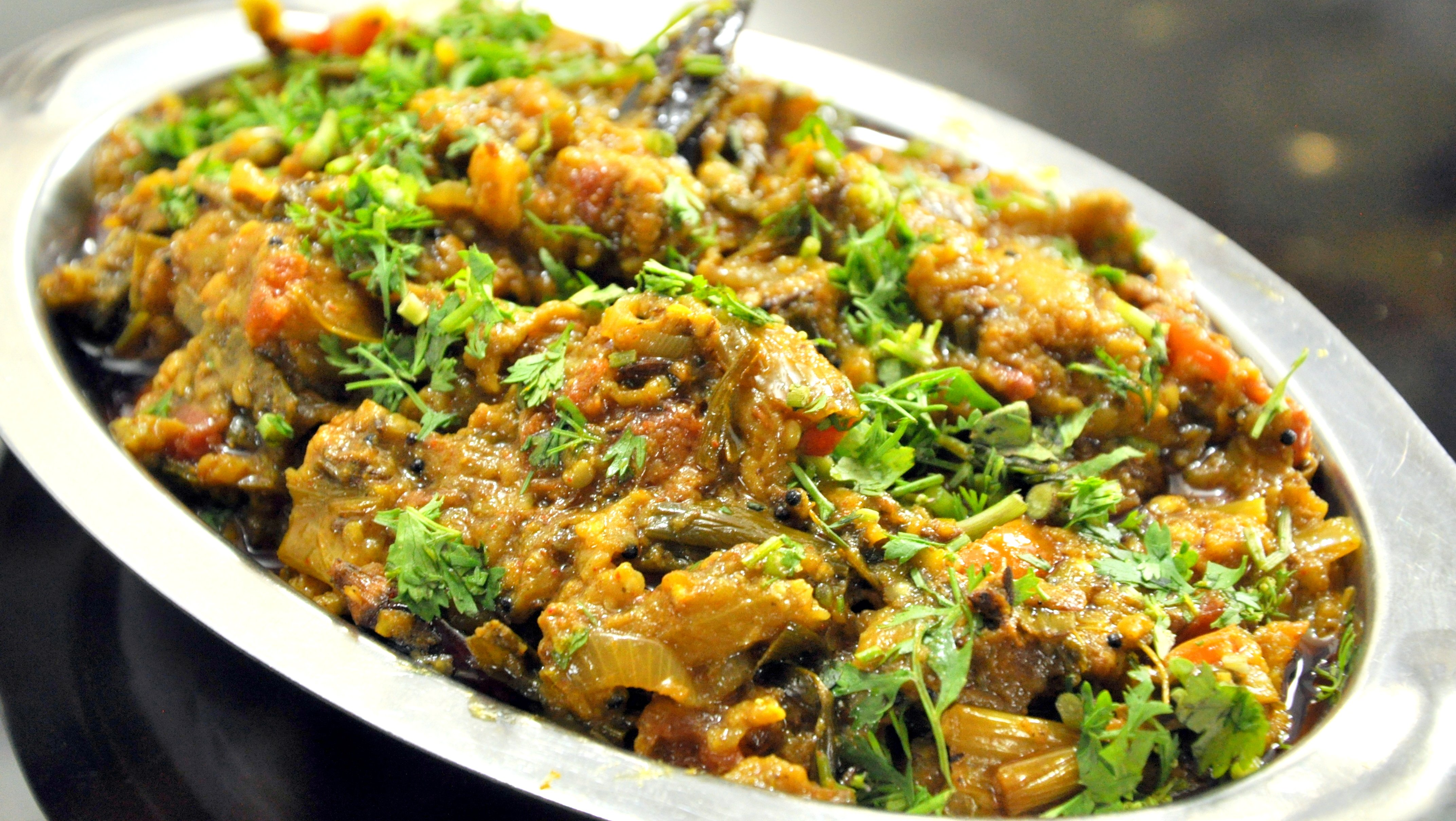
Baigan bharta made in Nagpur, Maharashtra

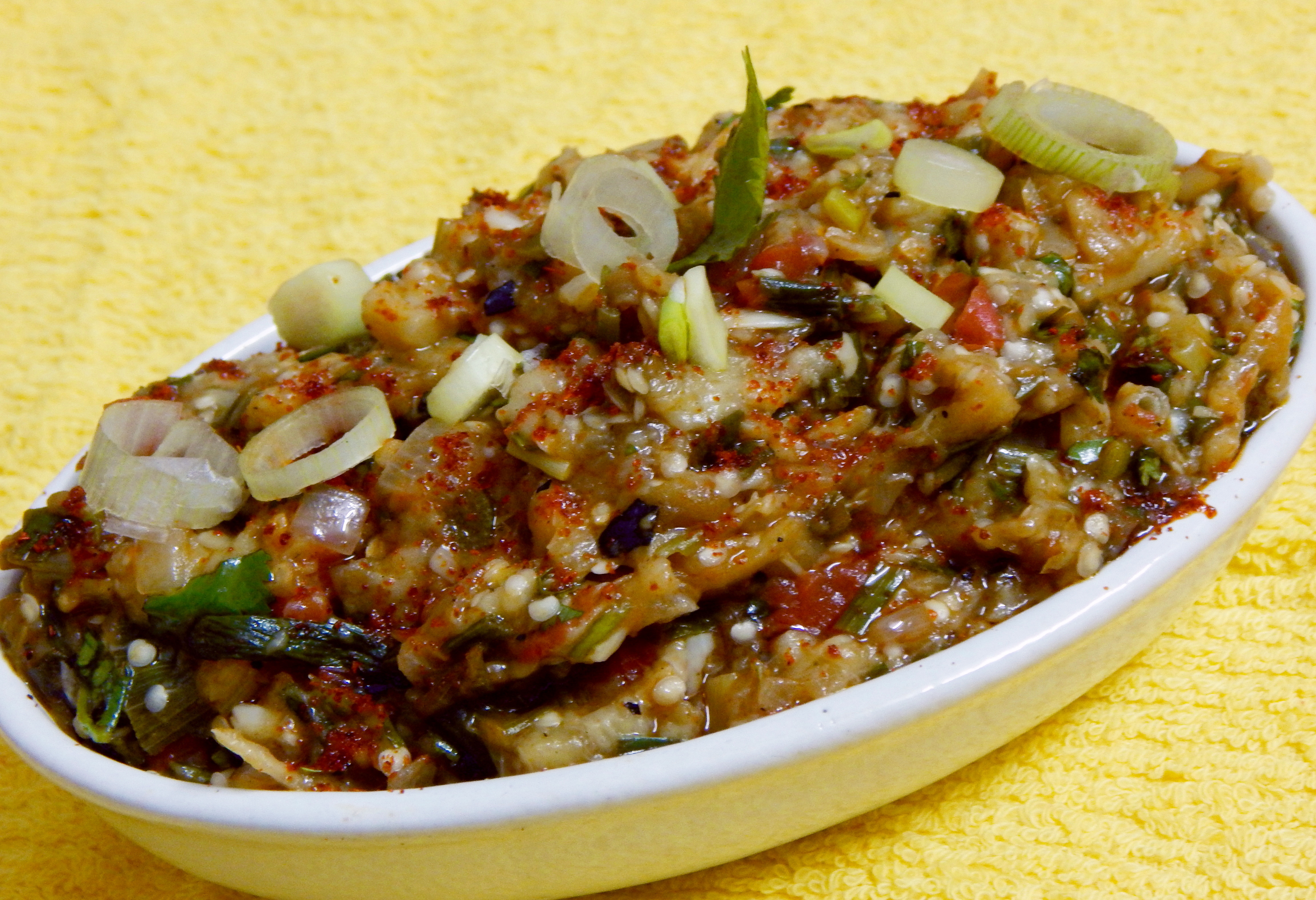

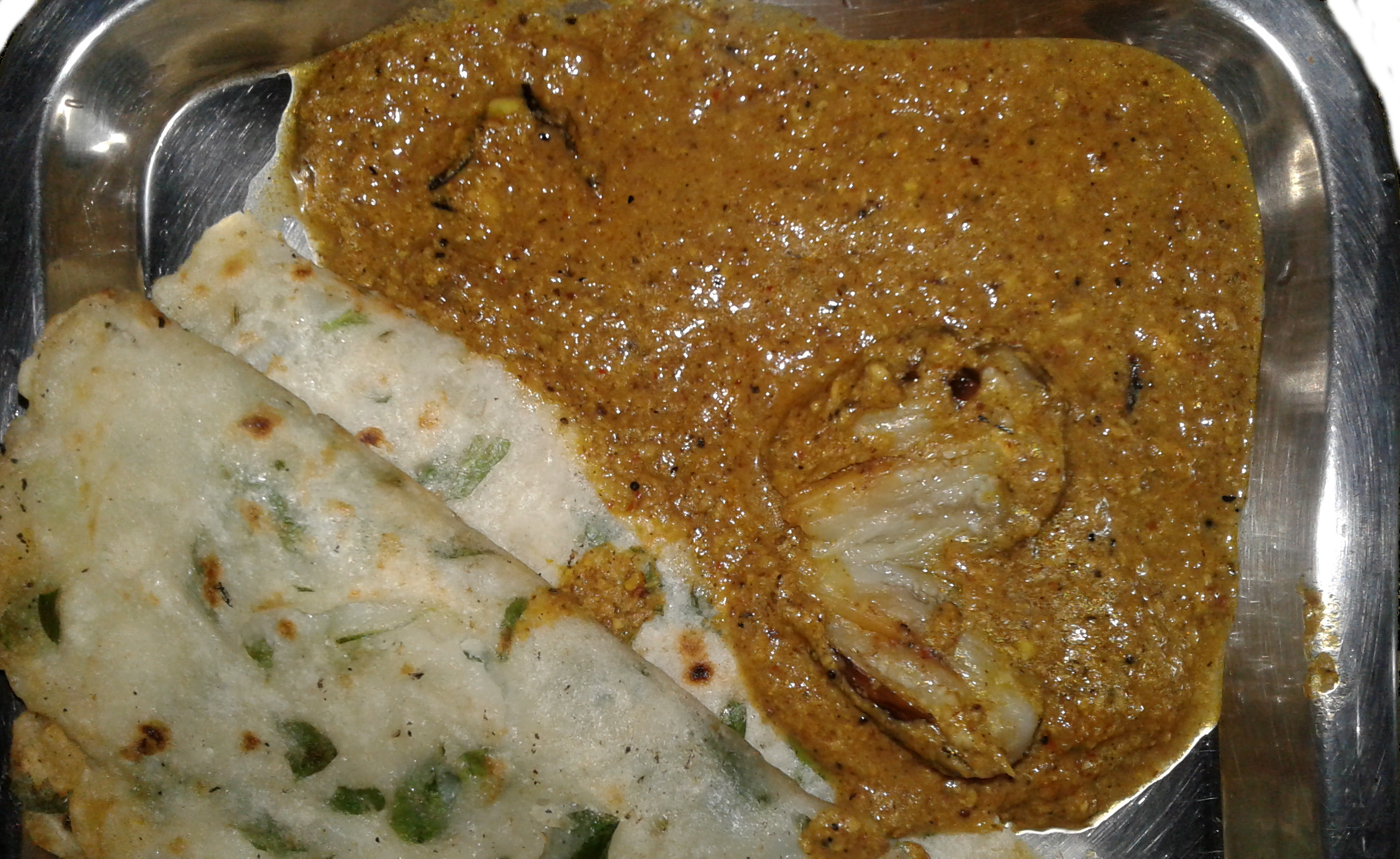
Akki rotti with eṇṇegāyi, a Karnataka dish

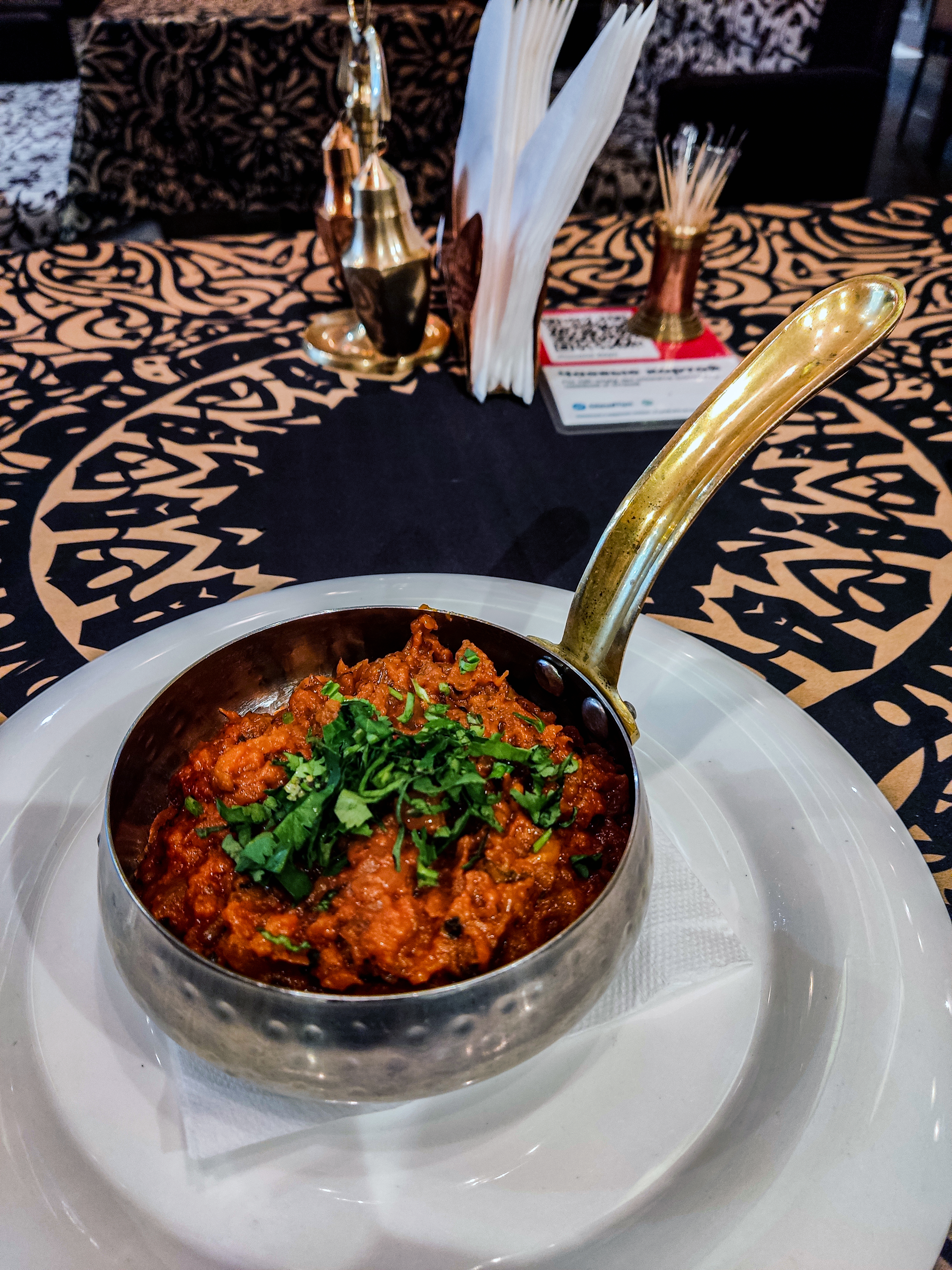
Baingan bharta served in a restaurant in Moscow, Russia

== Protest symbol ==
In a protest against Bt brinjal and the introduction of genetically modified crops, volunteers from Greenpeace and Delhi's Le Méridien hotel cooked 342 kilograms (754 lb) of organic brinjal bharta at Dilli Haat, New Delhi, on 6 September 2011. This set a world record for the largest amount of the dish produced in one occasion of preparation. A portion of the final dish was sent to Indian Prime Minister Manmohan Singh's residence, accompanied by a letter of protest containing an explanation.

== See also ==
- Baba ghanoush, Middle Eastern recipe from baked eggplant
- List of eggplant dishes
