= Ragi rotti =

Indian flatbread

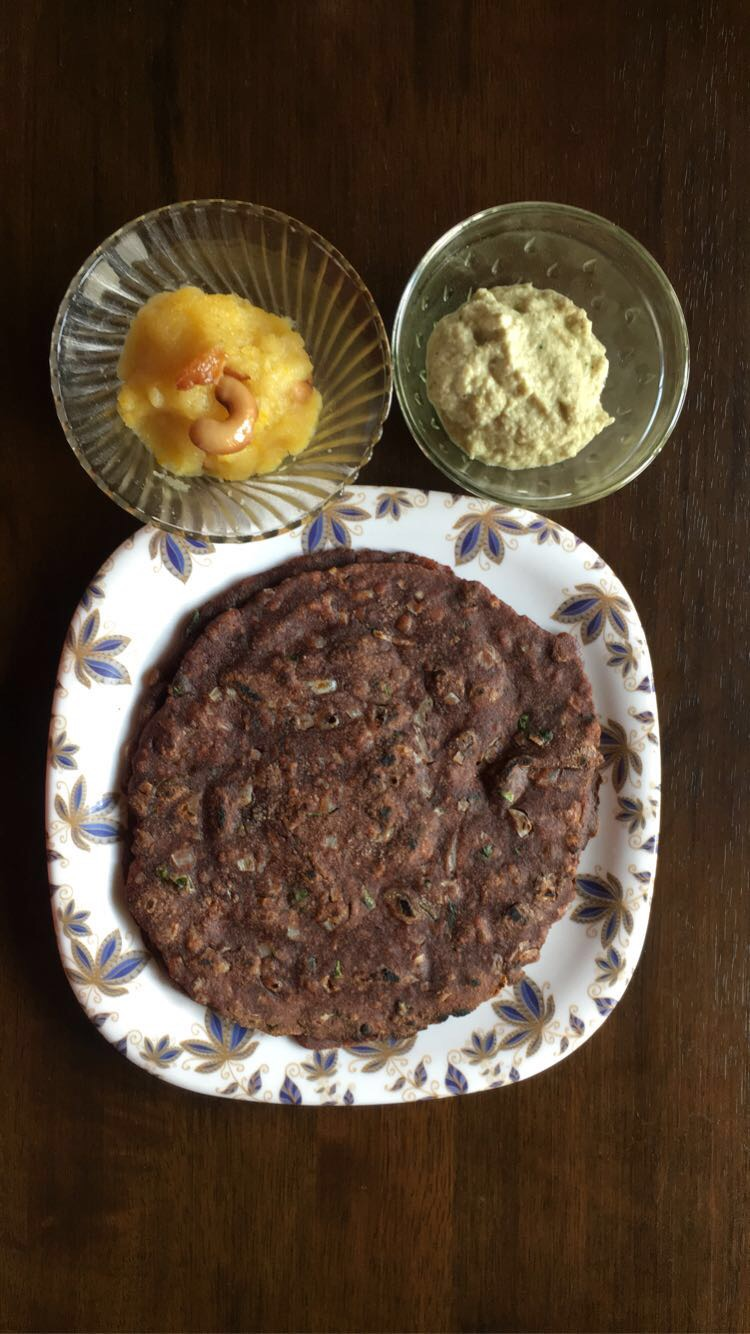
- Type: Flatbread
- Course: Breakfast
- Place of origin: India
- Region or state: Karnataka
- Serving temperature: Hot
- Main ingredients: Finger millet flour, water

Ragi rotti (Kannada: ರಾಗಿ ರೊಟ್ಟಿ) is a breakfast food of the state of Karnataka, India. It is most popular in the rural areas of southern Karnataka. It is made of ragi (finger millet) flour. Ragi rotti means ragi pancake in the native language, Kannada. It is prepared in the same way as akki rotti. The ragi flour is mixed with salt and water and kneaded well to come up with a soft dough. While making the dough, sliced onions and carrots, chopped coriander and cumin seeds can also be added for taste. Oil is spread over a griddle (tava) and a small amount of the dough is neatly spread over it to resemble a thin pancake (rotti). A small amount of oil is spread over it and the rotti is cooked on the hot griddle till it turns crisp. Ragi rotti is served hot and is eaten along with chutney.

== See also ==
- Cuisine of Karnataka
- Akki rotti
- Nachni bhakri
- Ragi mudde
