= Bhakri =

Flatbread of western and central India

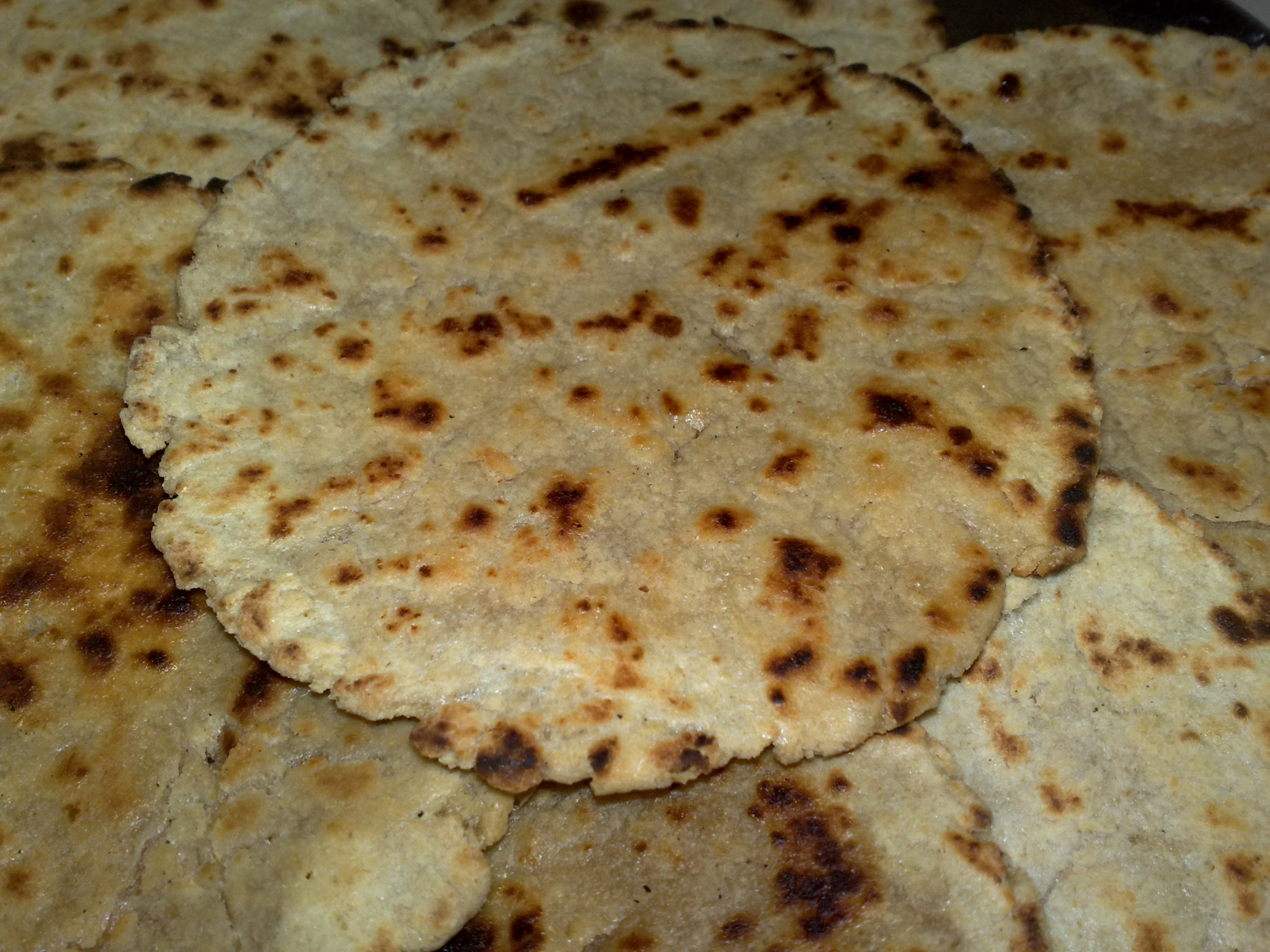
- Bhakri
- Type: Flatbread
- Place of origin: India
- Region or state: Maharashtra, Gujarat, Rajasthan, Malwa, Central India, Karnataka, and Goa
- Main ingredients: Flour

Bhakri (bhākri, bhākkari, bhākari, bhākhri, bhākhari) is a round flatbread often eaten in the cuisines of the states of Maharashtra, Gujarat, Rajasthan, and Karnataka in India. Bhakri is prepared using jowar or bajra, which make a coarser bread than does regular wheat chapati flour. Bhakri can be either soft or hard in texture, unlike khakhra, which is always hard.

== Grains and variants ==
Different types of millet are the common grains used for making bhakris. These millet bhakris are popular in the Deccan Plateau regions of India (Maharashtra and Northern Karnataka) as well as the semi-arid regions of Rajasthan. In the coastal Konkan and Goa regions of western India rice flour is used for making bhakri.

1. Jowar bhakri – Jowar bhakris are the most common type of bhakri. The dough is prepared by mixing jowar flour with hot water and then flattened by hand.
2. Bajra bhakri – Bajra bhakris are mainly prepared in winter, especially near the festival of Sankranti. The preparation is similar to jowar bhakris.
3. Makai bhakri – Cornmeal bhakris are commonly prepared during winters. Also known as makai no rotlo in Gujarati and makyachi bhakri in Marathi.
4. Ragi bhakri – Ragi bhakhris, or ragi rottis, are made of red finger millet. They are prepared similarly to other bhakris.
5. Rice bhakri – Rice bhakhris are made of rice flour, prepared similarly to other bhakris. They are common in the Konkan region.
6. Wheat bhakri – Wheat bhakris are like wheat rotis, but bigger in size and depth, with proportionally more oil.
7. Pulse bhakri – Prepared from urad dal or mixed flour of urad and jowar, also known as kalna bhakri. They are common in the Khandesh region.

== Preparation ==
The dough for bhakri is prepared by mixing the flour with a small amount of salt in a bowl and kneading into a smooth stiff dough, using hot water. The dough is split into little balls. The ball is then flattened using one's palms. There are two ways to make the bhakri. It is either flattened on a surface by pressing with one's palm or it is made thin by holding the ball in both palms which requires a lot of skill. The tava (pan) is heated and the bhakri is cooked by applying a little water to the upper surface and spreading it all over with the help of the cook's fingers. The other side is also cooked on the tava. Once it is prepared, it is roasted in the direct flame on both sides. A bhakri can be either soft or hard. The hard bhakri basically has a hard outer layer to add a crunch.

== Serving ==
Bhakri is typically served with yogurt, garlic chutney, pithla, baingan bharta, thecha (chutney made of green chillies and peanuts), preparations of green leafy vegetables and raw onion. In northern parts of Karnataka, it is served with stuffed brinjal curry. In Vidarbha, it is eaten with jhunka, a coarse and thick variant of pithla. It has traditionally been the rural staple which would be carried to the farm at the crack of dawn and make up for both breakfast and lunch. In the fields, bhakri even used to serve as a plate, on which chutney, kharda or thecha was served and eaten together. In Khandesh region, bhakri and shev bhaji (thick savory curry prepared from sev) is a commonly served dish. In the coastal regions like Konkan and Goa, rice flour bhakris are mainly served with fish curry.

In modern days, bhakris have increasingly been replaced by wheat rotis and phulkas but they still retain popularity in many regions and as specialty dishes.

== See also ==
- Kulcha
- Paratha
- List of Indian breads
