= Thalipeeth =

Indian flatbread

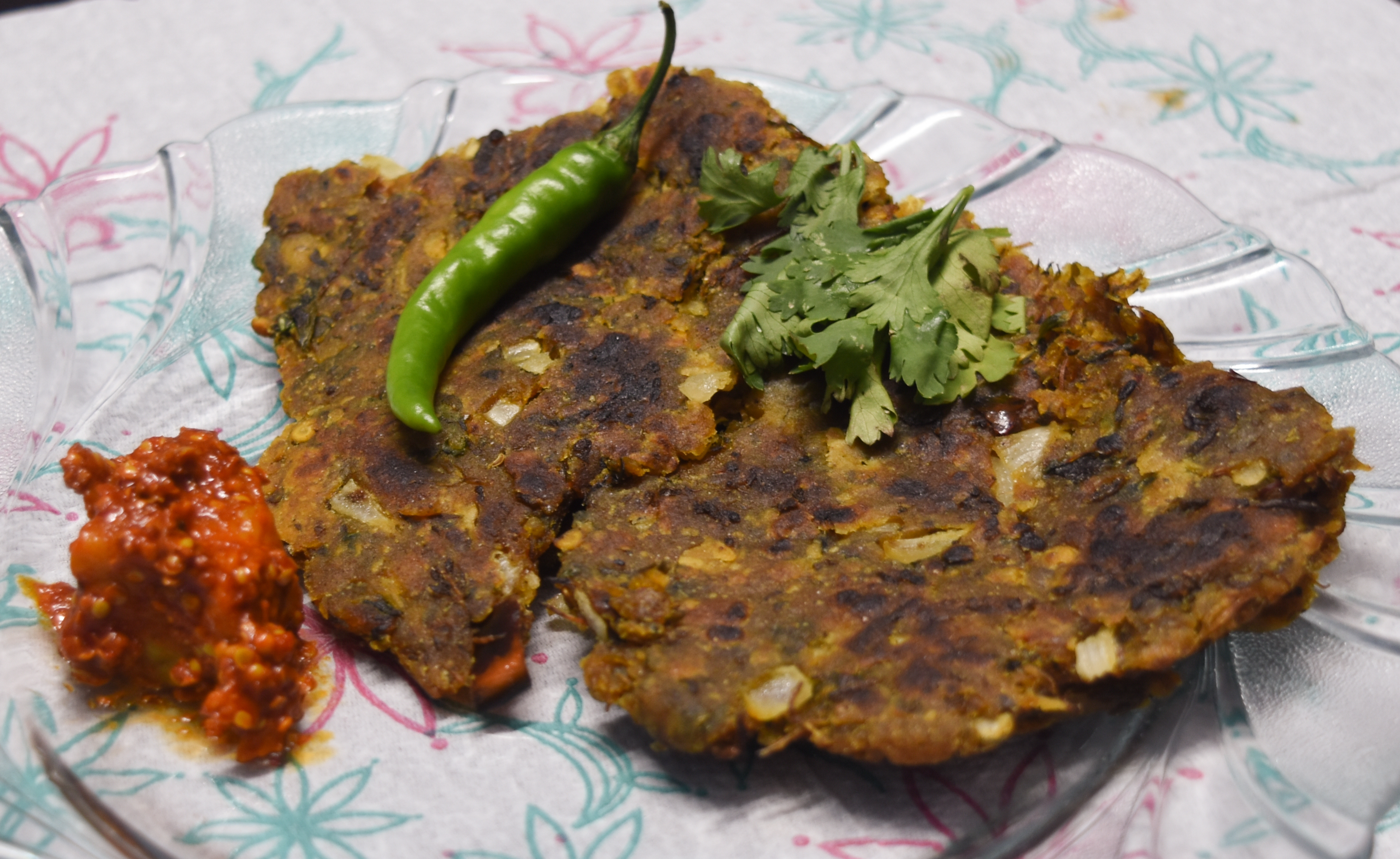
- Place of origin: India
- Region or state: Maharashtra especially Desh region and Marathwada
- Main ingredients: Flour (chana daal, urad daal, coriander seeds, cumin seeds, wheat, and rice)

Thalipeeth or thalipith is a savoury multi-grain flatbread popular in Western India, particularly in the state of Maharashtra. The flour for thalipeeth, called bhajanee, is prepared from roasted grains, legumes and spices. The ingredients include grains such as rice, wheat, bajra, and jowar; legumes such as chana, and urad; and spices, most commonly coriander and cumin seeds. When preparing the dough, other ingredients such as onion, fresh coriander, other vegetables and spices are added. Thalipeeth is usually served with butter (preferably made from water buffalo milk), ghee, or yogurt. While the dish is popular in Maharashtra it is especially popular in Marathwada, Telangana and North Karnataka.

In a variation from bhajani, flour made from tapioca (sabudana) and rajgira (amaranth) is used to make a thalipeeth on Hindu fasting days.

== See also ==
- List of Indian breads
