= Pashti =

Indian flatbread

- Type: Flatbread
- Place of origin: India
- Region or state: South India
- Main ingredients: Rice flour

Pashti is a flatbread common to the Southern Indian subcontinent. It is usually made with rice flour and pan-fried in ghee/cooking oil. A pashti is usually served with either chutneys, usually peanut (Phalli Ki Chutney) or with curry.

Pashti is made by kneading rice flour in hot water, as cold water tends to form lumps. The dough is then rolled out with a rolling pin, and circles are cut out by pressing a plate or jar top onto the dough.

== See also ==
- Kerala Porotta
- List of Indian breads
