= Kulcha =

South Asian flatbread

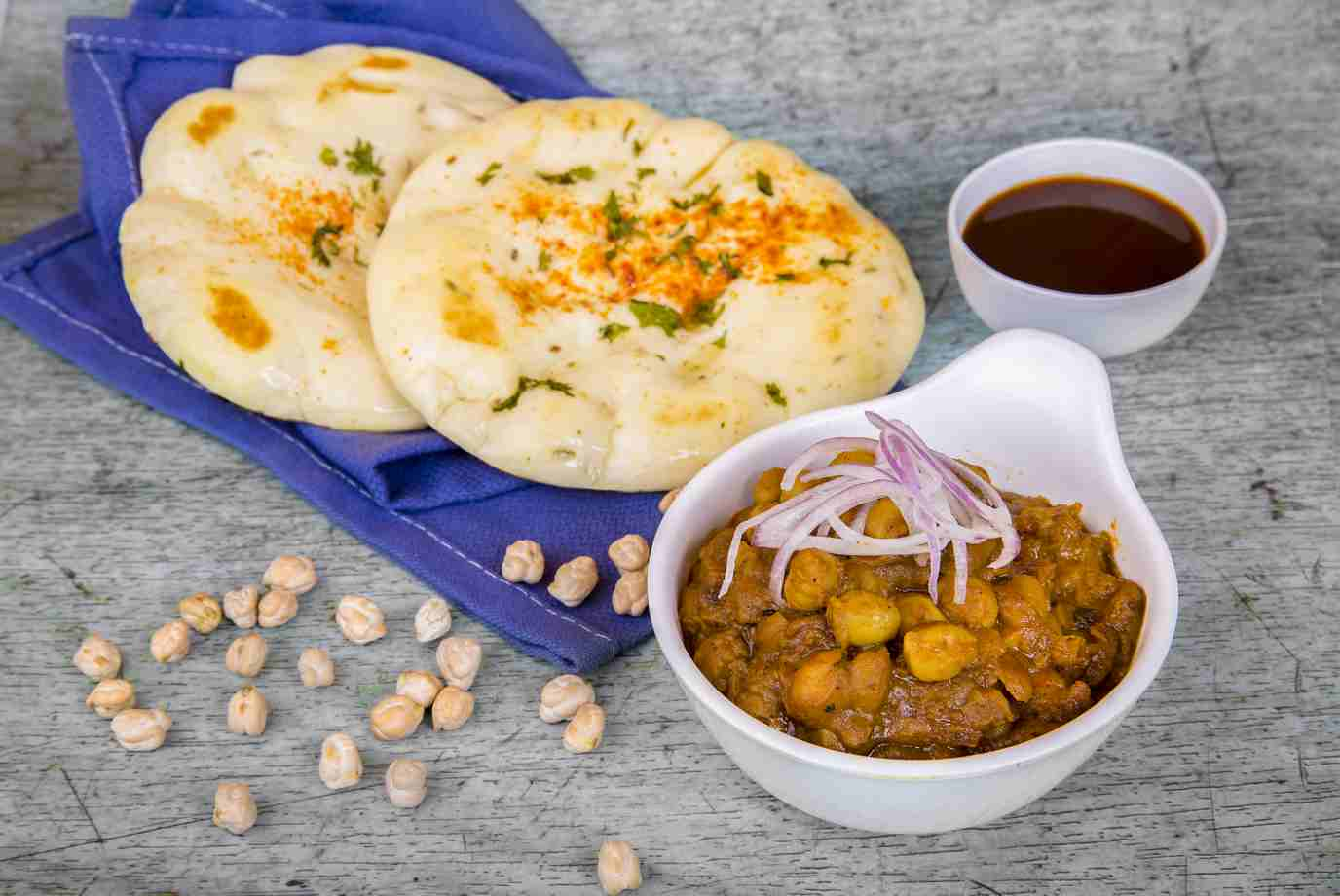
- Kulcha with chole from India
- Type: Flatbread
- Region or state: Punjab
- Associated cuisine: Indian, Pakistani, Punjabi
- Main ingredients: Maida

Kulcha (IPA: [kʊltʃaː]) is a type of Indian flatbread made from refined wheat flour, fermented in earthen pots and baked in a tandoor. The term kulcha derives from a Persian term for a disc-shaped loaf of leavened bread. In India, this term is commonly used for regular English disc-shaped bread.

Another variant of kulcha is khatai or sweet kulcha, which is prepared in a similar manner, but with sugar substituted for salt.

== Origin and terminology ==
The term kulcha is Persian (کلوچه) and describes a disc-shaped loaf of bread, bun or even biscuit. However, in India this term came to be associated with round breads popularized during the British colonial period.

In some parts of India, naan or tandoori parantha is often confused with kulcha.

== See also ==
- List of Indian breads
- List of Pakistani breads
