= Khakhra =

Indian crispy flatbread

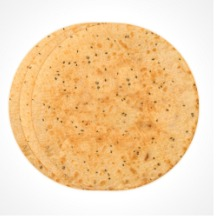
- Three khakhra
- Place of origin: India
- Region or state: Gujarat
- Main ingredients: Mat bean, wheat flour

Khakhra or khakra is a thin, crisp flatbread from western India, closely associated with Gujarati and Jain cuisines and is also eaten in some parts of Rajasthan. It is traditionally made by rolling a dough of whole-wheat flour (atta) with a little oil, then roasting it on a griddle (tava) while pressing until fully dry and brittle. Khakhra is commonly eaten as a light breakfast or snack, often with tea, South Asian pickle, chutneys, ghee or butter.

== Ingredients and preparation ==
The base dough is primarily whole-wheat flour and oil; salt and mild spices may be added. During cooking, partially puffed phulka-like discs are pressed firmly on a hot tava with a cloth or wooden press until moisture is driven off and the disc turns rigid and shatter-crisp.

== Varieties ==
Beyond plain (sada) khakhra, common flavourings include methi (fenugreek), jeera (cumin) and mixed masala. Contemporary commercial and home recipes also substitute or blend other flours (such as finger millet/ragi, barley, or besan, among others) to create multigrain versions.

== Consumption and commercialization ==
Khakhra is a breakfast and teatime staple in many Gujarati and Jain households and has an established packaged-snack market with numerous regional brands and flavours.

== See also ==
- Crispbread
- Gujarat
- Gujarati people
- Indian cuisine
- List of Indian breads
