= Eidi =

Eidi may refer to:

- Eidiyah, a gift, usually money, given to children on Eid al-Fitr and Eid al-Adha
- Eiði, a village on Eysturoy, Faroe Islands
