= Green envelope =

Malay adaptation of the Chinese red envelope custom

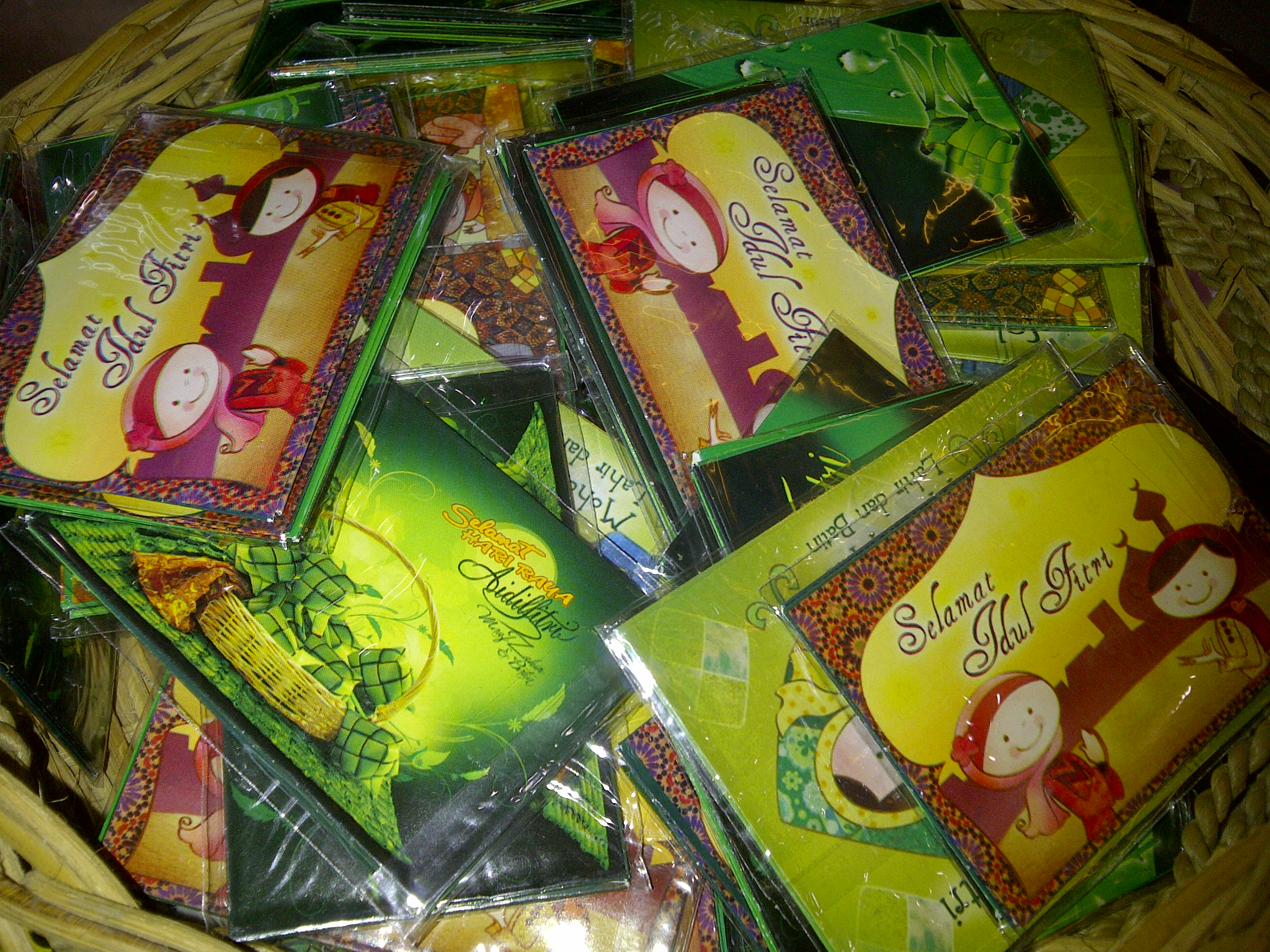
Green envelopes for sale at the Surabaya market

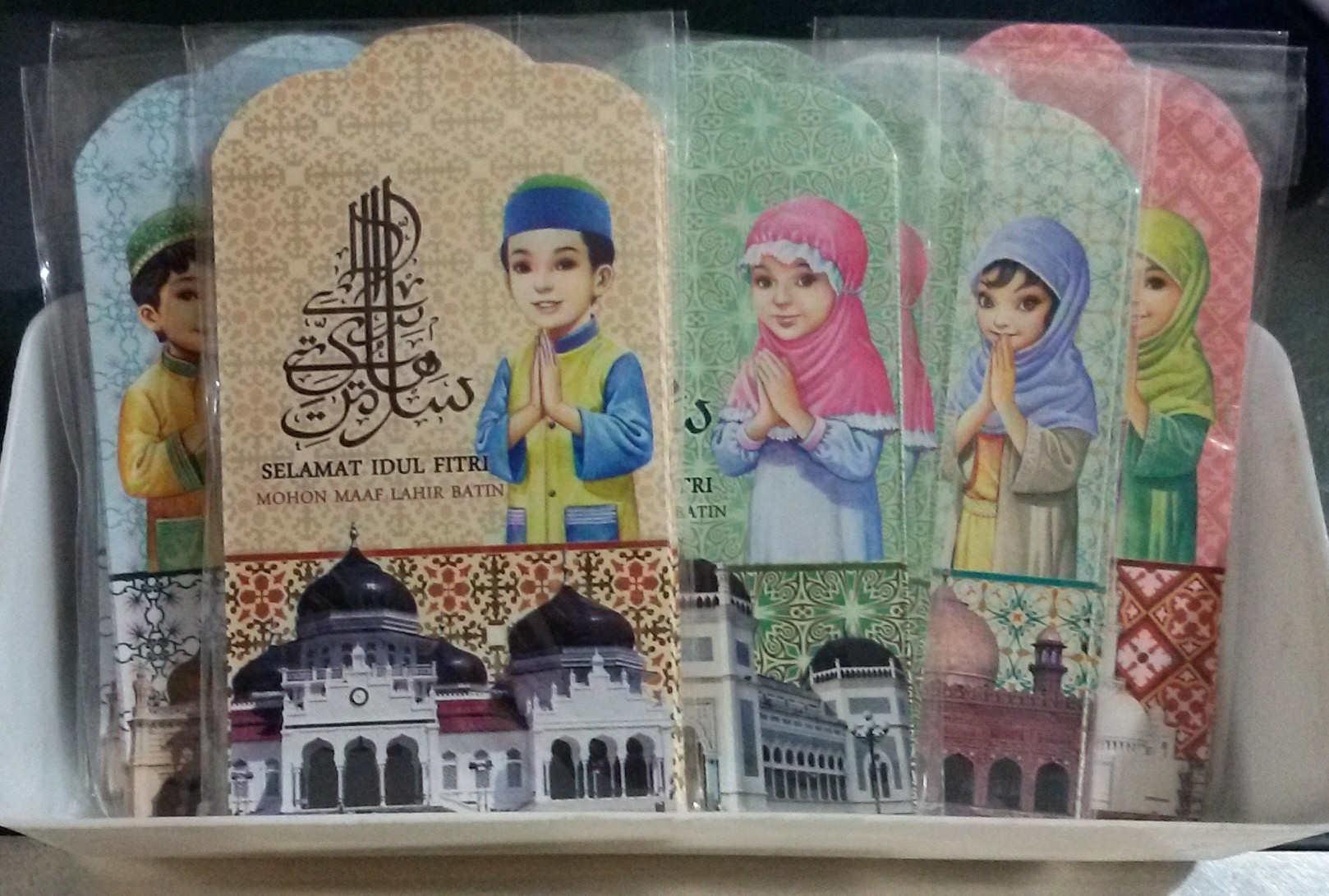
Green envelopes in Indonesia (2016)

A green envelope or green packet (Malay: sampul hijau or sampul duit raya) is an Islamic adaptation of the Chinese red envelope custom. During the festival of Hari Raya, Muslims in Malaysia, Brunei, Singapore, and Indonesia hand out money in green envelopes to guests who visit their homes. The colour green was chosen for its association with the Islamic paradise. The idea of handing out green envelopes is based on the Islamic concept of zakat, where every Muslim is required to provide at least 2.5% of their wealth to the needy. However, Malays now hand out these green envelopes during Hari Raya not only to poor guests, but also to the middle and upper classes. The amount of money depends on how much the host can afford to give their guests.

== See also ==
- Eidiyah
- Red envelope
