= Eid al-Fitr =

Islamic holiday on the first of Shawwal

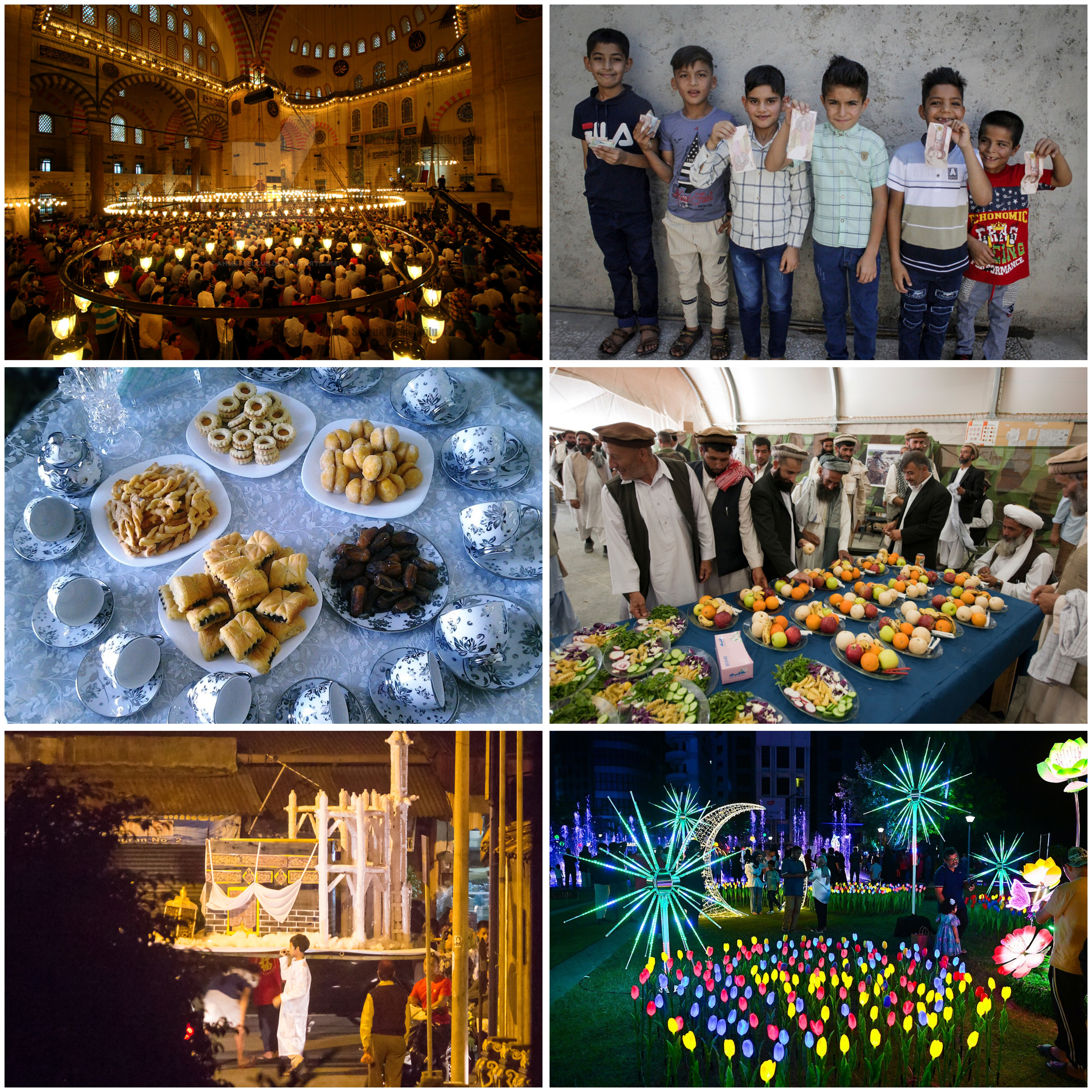
- Clockwise from top: Bayram Namazı in Istanbul; Muslim children receiving Eidi; Afghan Eid celebrations; Decorations in the Maldives; Parade in Indonesia at night; Algerian Eid table
- Also called: Lesser Eid, Sweet Eid, Sugar Feast
- Observed by: Muslims
- Type: Islamic
- Significance: To mark the end of fasting in Ramadan
- Celebrations: Zakat al-Fitr, Eid prayers, gift-giving (Eidi), family and social gatherings, festive meals, symbolic decoration, charity
- Date: 1 Shawwal
- 2026 date: 20 – 22 March (Note: The actual date may vary across countries as per the moon sighting.)
- 2027 date: 9 – 11 March
- Related to: Ramadan, Eid al-Adha

Eid al-Fitr (Note: /ˌiːd əl ˈfɪtər, -trə/ EED əl FIT-ər, -rə; Arabic: عيد الفطر, romanized: ʿĪd al-Fiṭr, lit. 'Festival of Breaking the Fast', pronounced [ʕiːd æl ˈfɪtˤr]) is the first of the two main festivals in Islam, the other being Eid al-Adha. The holiday falls on the first day of Shawwal, the tenth month of the Islamic calendar. (Note: This does not always fall on the same Gregorian calendar date, as the start of any lunar Hijri month varies based on when the new moon is sighted by local religious authorities.) One of the most important Islamic celebrations, Eid al-Fitr is celebrated by Muslims worldwide as it marks the end of the month-long, dawn-to-dusk fasting (sawm) during Ramadan. The holiday is known under various other names in different languages and countries around the world. (Note: The day is also known as the First Eid or as the Lesser Eid (Arabic: العيد الصغير, romanized: al-ʿĪd al-Ṣaghīr) by some Muslim communities.)

Eid al-Fitr begins with a communal prayer and is followed by visits to relatives, giving gifts, and sharing meals. It has a particular salah that consists of two rakats generally performed in an open field or large hall. It may only be performed in congregation (jamāʿat) and features six additional Takbirs (raising of the hands to the ears whilst reciting the Takbir, saying "Allāhu ʾAkbar", meaning "God is the greatest"). In the Hanafi school of Sunni Islam, there are three Takbirs at the start of the first rakat and three just before rukūʿ in the second rakat. Other Sunni schools usually have 12 Takbirs, similarly split in groups of seven and five. In Shia Islam, the salat has six Takbirs in the first rakat at the end of Tilawa, before rukūʿ, and five in the second. Depending on the juristic opinion of the locality, this salat is either farḍ (فرض, obligatory) or mustaḥabb (strongly recommended). After the salat, Muslims celebrate the Eid al-Fitr in various ways with food being a central theme, which also gives the holiday the nickname "Sweet Eid" or "Sugar Feast".

In many parts of the world, Eid al-Fitr is also characterized by distinctive local customs that reflect regional cultures. Communities often mark the occasion with large family visits, public celebrations, and the sharing of traditional foods and sweets prepared specifically for the holiday. Markets and neighborhoods in several countries become especially lively as people buy new clothing, gifts, and festive meals, while charitable giving and community gatherings remain central elements of the celebration. Despite cultural differences, the festival commonly emphasizes social connection, generosity, and the strengthening of family and community ties.

== History ==
According to Muslim tradition, Muhammad instituted the celebration of Eid al-Fitr. According to a certain hadith, these festivals were initiated in Medina after the migration of Muhammad from Mecca. Anas ibn Malik, a companion of Muhammad, narrated that when Muhammad arrived in Medina, he found people celebrating two specific days in which they entertained themselves with recreation. Muhammad then remarked that God had fixed two mandatory days of festivity: Eid al-Fitr and Eid al-Adha.

== General rituals ==
Eid al-Fitr begins at sunset on the night of the first sighting of the crescent moon. The night on which the moon is sighted is celebrated as Chand Raat in countries like Bangladesh. If the moon is not observed immediately after the 29th day of the previous lunar month (either because clouds block its view or because the western sky is still too bright when the moon sets), then the holiday is celebrated the following day. Eid al-Fitr is celebrated for one to three days, depending on the country. It is forbidden to fast on the Day of Eid, and a specific prayer is nominated for this day. As an obligatory act of charity, money is paid to the poor and the needy (zakat al-Fitr) before performing the 'Eid prayer.

=== Eid prayer ===
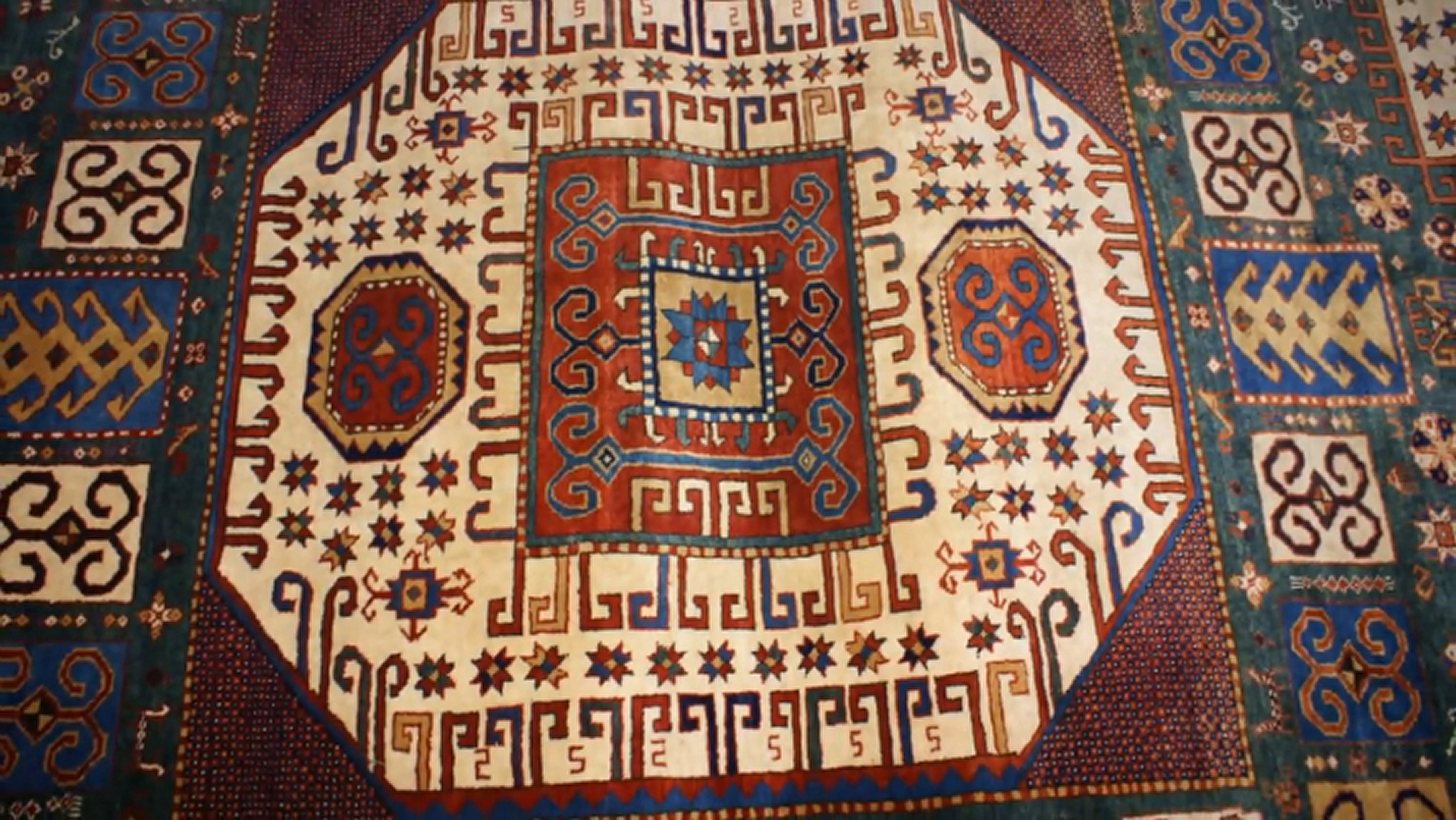
Many Muslims often bring prayer rugs to the mosque on Eid al-Fitr.

The Eid prayer is performed by the congregation in an open area such as a field, community center, or mosque. No call to prayer is given for this Eid prayer, and it consists of only two rakaʿāt, with a variable amount of takbirs and other prayer elements depending on the branch of Islam observed. The Eid prayer is followed by the khutbah and then a dua asking for God's forgiveness, mercy, peace and blessings for all living beings across the world. The sermon also instructs Muslims as to the performance of rituals of Eid, such as the zakāt. The sermon of Eid takes place after the Eid prayer, unlike Friday prayer which comes first before prayer. Some imams believe that listening to the sermon at Eid is optional. After the prayers, Muslims visit their relatives, friends, and acquaintances or hold large communal celebrations in homes, community centers, or rented halls.

==== Sunni procedure ====
As ritual dictates, Sunnis praise God in a loud voice while going to the Eid prayer:

Allāhu Akbar, Allāhu Akbar. Lā ilāha illà l-Lāh. Allāhu Akbar, Allahu akbar, wa-li-l-Lāh al-ḥamd

Recitation ceases when they get to the place of Eid or once the Imam commences activities.

The prayer starts by doing niyyah "intention" for the prayer before the takbir is said by the imam. Next, the takbir al-ihram is performed, by saying takbir three times, raising hands to the ears and dropping them each time, except for the last when the hands are folded. The Imam then reads al-Fatihah, followed by another surah. The congregation performs ruku and sujud. This completes the first rak'ah.

The congregation rises and folds their hands for the second rak'ah, after which the imam recites al-Fatiha followed by another surah. After this, three takbirs are called out just before the ruku, each time raising hands to the ears and dropping them. For the fourth time, the congregation says Allahu Akbar and subsequently goes into the ruku. The rest of the prayer is completed regularly. This completes the Eid prayer. After the prayer, there is a khutbah.

==== Shia procedure ====
The prayer starts with the Niyyat followed by five Takbirs. During every Takbir of the first rakat, a special Dua is recited. Then, the Imam recites Sūrat al-Fātiḥah and Surat Al-'A`lá and the congregation performs Ruku and Sujud as in other prayers. In the second Rakat, the same above steps (five Takbeers, Sūrat al-Fātiḥah and Surat Al-'A`lá, Ruku and Sujud) are repeated. After the prayer, the khutbah starts.

=== Post-prayer celebration ===
During the Eid celebration, Muslims greet each other by saying 'Eid Mubarak', which is Arabic for "Blessed Eid". As it comes after a month of fasting, sweet dishes and foods are often prepared and consumed during the celebration. Muslims typically decorate their homes, and are also encouraged to forgive each other and seek forgiveness. In countries with large Muslim populations, it is normally a public holiday with most schools and businesses closed for the day. Practices differ by country and region.

== Practices and culture by country and regions ==
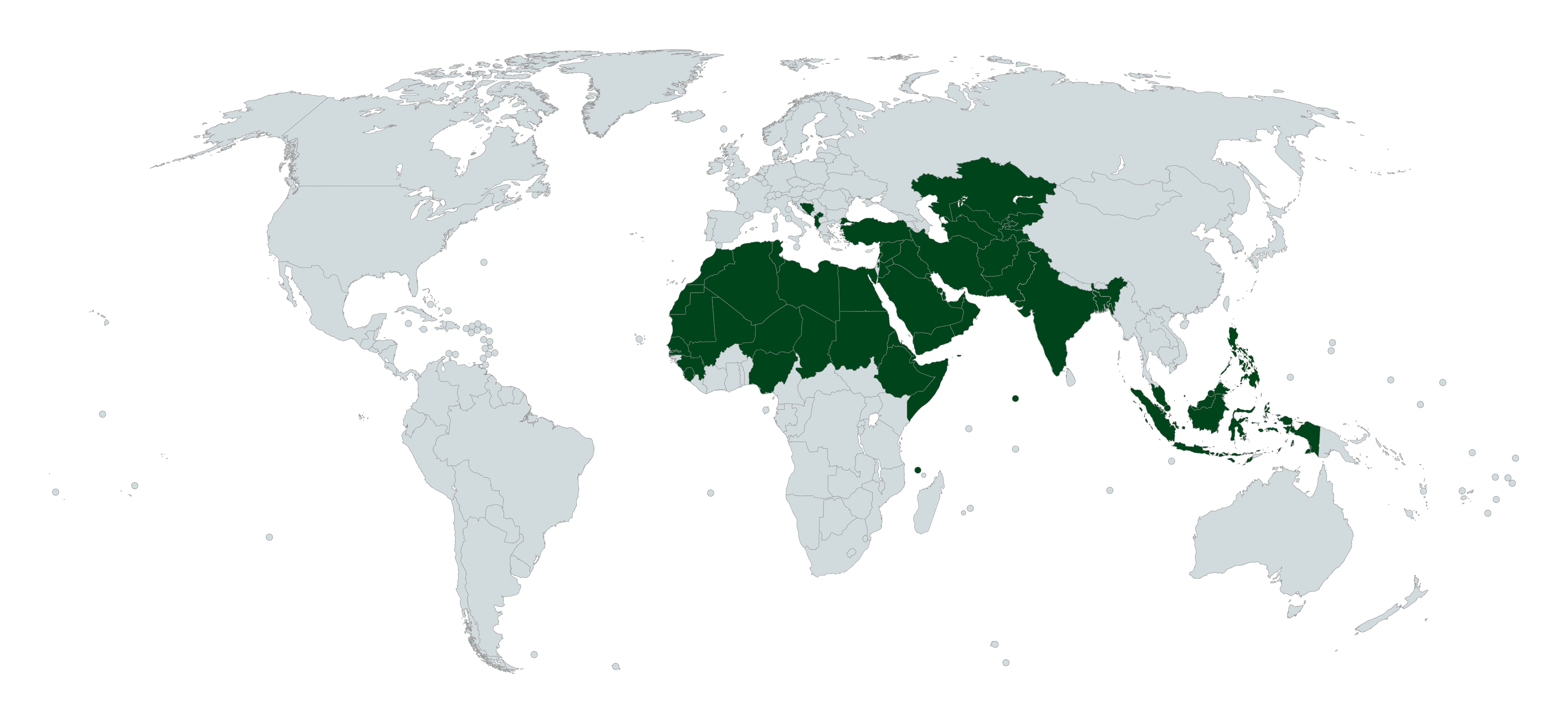
Countries where Eid al-Fitr is an official public holiday

=== West Asia ===
==== Turkey ====
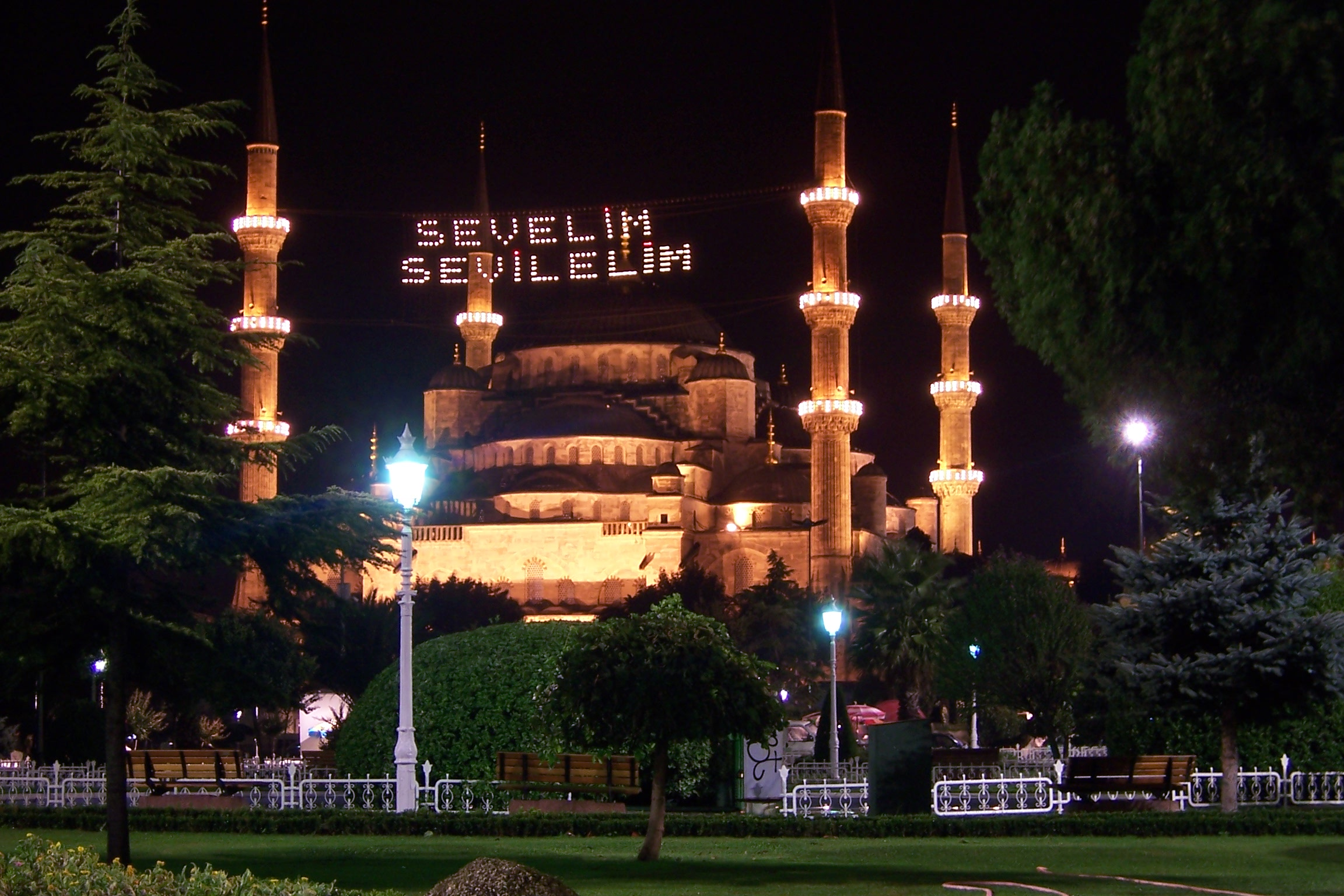
Traditional Bayram wishes from the Istanbul Metropolitan Municipality, stating "Let us love, Let us be loved", in the form of mahya lights stretched across the minarets of the Blue Mosque in Istanbul

In Turkey, nationwide celebrated holidays are referred to as bayram, and Eid al-Fitr is referred to as both Ramazan Bayramı ("Ramadan Bayram") and Şeker Bayramı ("Bayram of Sweets/Sugar"). It is a time for people to attend prayer services, put on their best clothes (referred to as bayramlık, often purchased just for the occasion), visit all their loved ones (such as relatives, neighbors, and friends), and pay their respects to the deceased with organised visits to cemeteries. It is also customary for young children to go around their neighborhood, door to door, and wish everyone a "Happy Bayram", for which they are awarded candy, chocolates, traditional sweets such as baklava and Turkish delight, or a small amount of money at every door.

Mosques, minarets and public fountains tend to be lighted up for the occasion, and popular events such as Sufi music concerts, dervish dancing ceremonies, and shadow puppet shows are held in the nights.

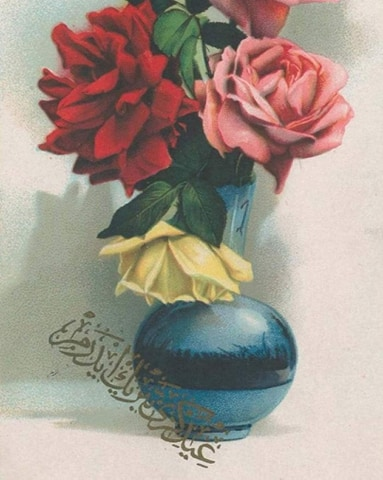
late 19th or early 20th century Ottoman Eid card

Ramadan in the Ottoman era was passed with great happiness due to the existence of various kinds of entertainment. The streets would be filled with performances by musicians, magicians and other talented people that suitable for all ages, so children could enjoy it. Poetry had a huge influence on Ottoman classical music, in fact it served as a basis. At iftar, they had popular song to be played that called fasil music along with some instruments such as tambourine and flute. Next, mahya illuminations represent gratitude towards God with lamps of olive oil, barb, and ropes which would form certain sentences or images as desired. This decoration lightened up the darkness of the night with the beauty of its light.

During Ramadan, many restaurants and cafes may have limited operating hours during the day and may be closed during fasting hours. In the middle of the night drummers circulate through towns and villages to wake sleepers so they can prepare Sahur, the big early-morning meal to be eaten before the fast begins again at sunrise. They tend to make their noise around 02:30 and 03:00 am, and they make sure everyone hears them. Turkish people invite anyone to break the fast together in the order of inviting older relatives first, other relatives, neighbors who are quite close, and some areas that have village's leaders, teachers, and caretakers where the order has been determined by tradition.

==== States of the Arabian Peninsula ====
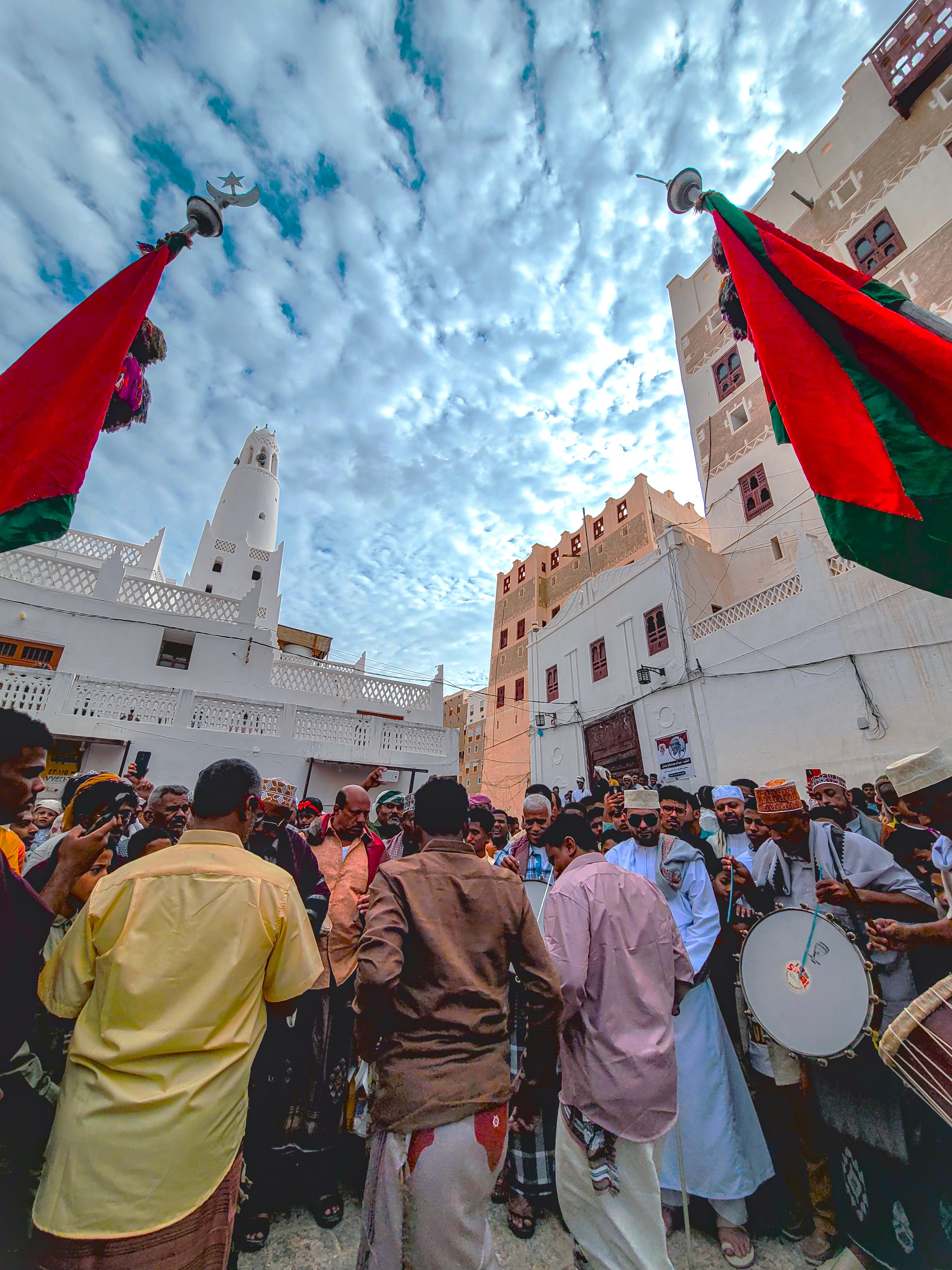
Eid celebrations in Shibam, Yemen

In the Arab states of the Persian Gulf countries, men would typically buy new Thobe (traditional white long robe) or dye their existing Thobes with walnut oil. Women would wear special clothes for the occasion along with special perfumes and braids. Most majlises would offer fruit, dates, tea or coffee to visitors. Those who live in rural areas tend to celebrate more modestly. Buildings, shops, roads and houses in UAE cities get decorated in bright festive lights. Many shows such as theatres would also occur.

In Bahrain, families often celebrate the festival with an eid dinner consisting of quzi or machboos rice dishes, while popular sweets include halwa or khanfroosh (see Bahraini cuisine). Men typically wear thawbs and women wear abayas, the latter also painting henna on their hands or feet.

Saudis decorate their homes and prepare sumptuous meals for family and friends. They prepare new clothes and shoes for the festival. Eid festivities in Saudi Arabia may vary culturally depending on the region, but one common thread in all celebrations is generosity and hospitality. It is a common Saudi tradition for families to gather at the patriarchal home after the Eid prayers. Before the special Eid meal is served, young children will line up in front of each adult family member, who dispense money as gifts to the children.

Omanis would typically eat foods such as shuwa (slow-cooked lamb) with coffee (see Omani cuisine). In some places such as Ibri, folklore songs and traditional dancing are often performed.

In Yemen, Bint al-sahn is the preferred snack during Eid celebrations.

In modern times, supermarkets, corporates, and malls compete to attract children during this time via advertising in newspapers and on TV, and by offering special promotions and arranging closed Gargee'an events to market themselves.

==== Palestine, Jordan, and Lebanon ====
After the Eid al-Fitr prayer, the people of Jerusalem will decorate the courtyards of the al-Aqsa Mosque with toys for children who come from all Palestinian areas to participate in the Eid al-Fitr prayer rituals. Many Palestinians go out to visit the families of Palestinian prisoners in Israel, visit the prisons themselves, and visit graves to lay wreaths on them.

Palestinians and Jordanians decorate their homes and prepare sumptuous meals for family and friends. They prepare new clothes and shoes for the festival. Eid festivities in Palestine and Jordan may vary culturally depending on the region, but generosity and hospitality are common in all celebrations. It is a common Palestinian Jordanian tradition for families to gather at the patriarchal home after the Eid prayers. Before the special Eid meal is served, young children will line up in front of each adult family member, who dispenses money as gifts to the children. Jordanians also hang fanous or "Eid lanterns".

In Lebanon, many concerts take place during Eid al-Fitr by Lebanese and other Arab superstars. Musicians also perform on the Beirut waterfront. Other activities include art exhibitions.

Ma'amoul and Kahk are popular cookie treats baked and consumed during Eid in the region.

==== Iraq ====
In Iraq, kleicha (the traditional snack) and lamb are popular foods.

==== Kurdistan region ====
The Kurds tend to visit cemeteries to remember their lost ones one day before the festival. After the prayers, Kurdish families would gather together for large breakfasts of rice and stew. Beans stew and apricot stew are the commons. Also they give candies to the people who knock their doors. Mostly children knock the doors. Later, they visit their relatives.

==== Iran ====
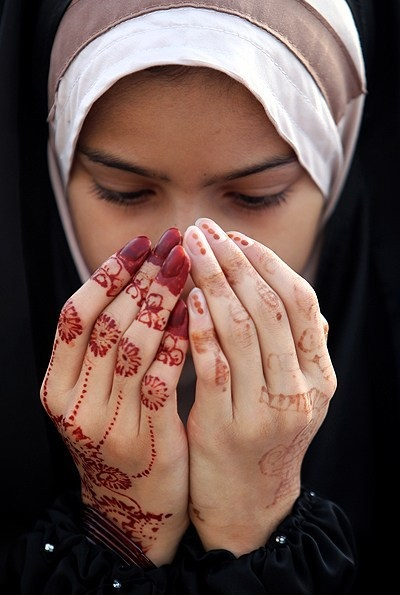
A girl with henna on her hand, during the Eid prayer

In Iran, where the occasion is known as Eid-e-Fitr (Persian: عید فطر), several groups of experts representing the office of the Supreme Leader of Iran, had gone to the different zones of the country at the last days of Ramadan to determine the date of Eid. Iranian Muslims take part in the Eid al-Fitr prayer and pay the Zakat al-Fitr. The Eid al-Fitr prayer, and the following sermon, had been led by the Supreme Leader at Tehran's Grand Mosalla mosque of Tehran (Mossalla). The celebration is typically marked by a one- or two-day national holiday.

=== Africa ===
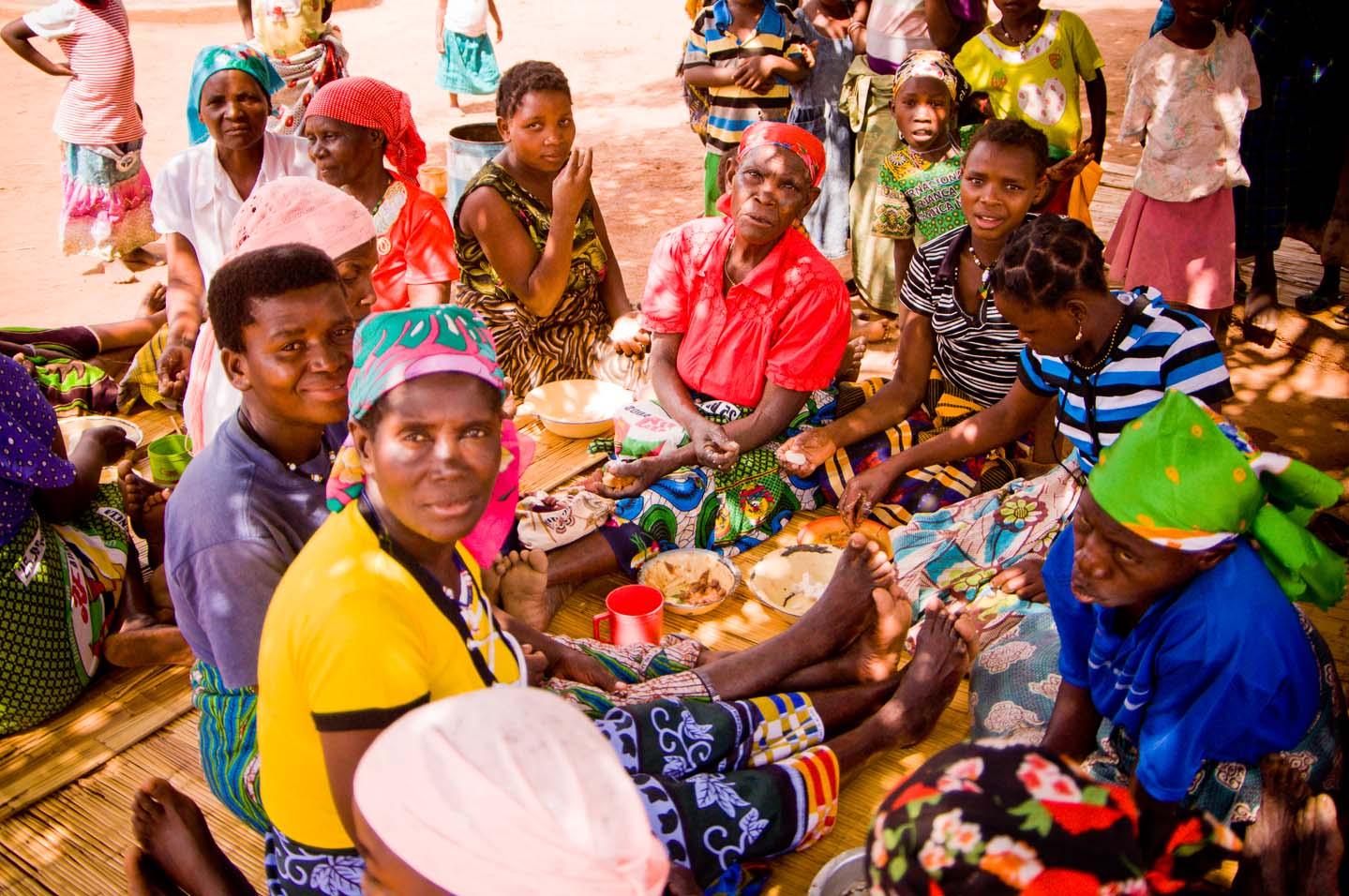
Group of Yao women sharing a meal of ugali during Eid ul-Fitr in Mozambique

Ghana

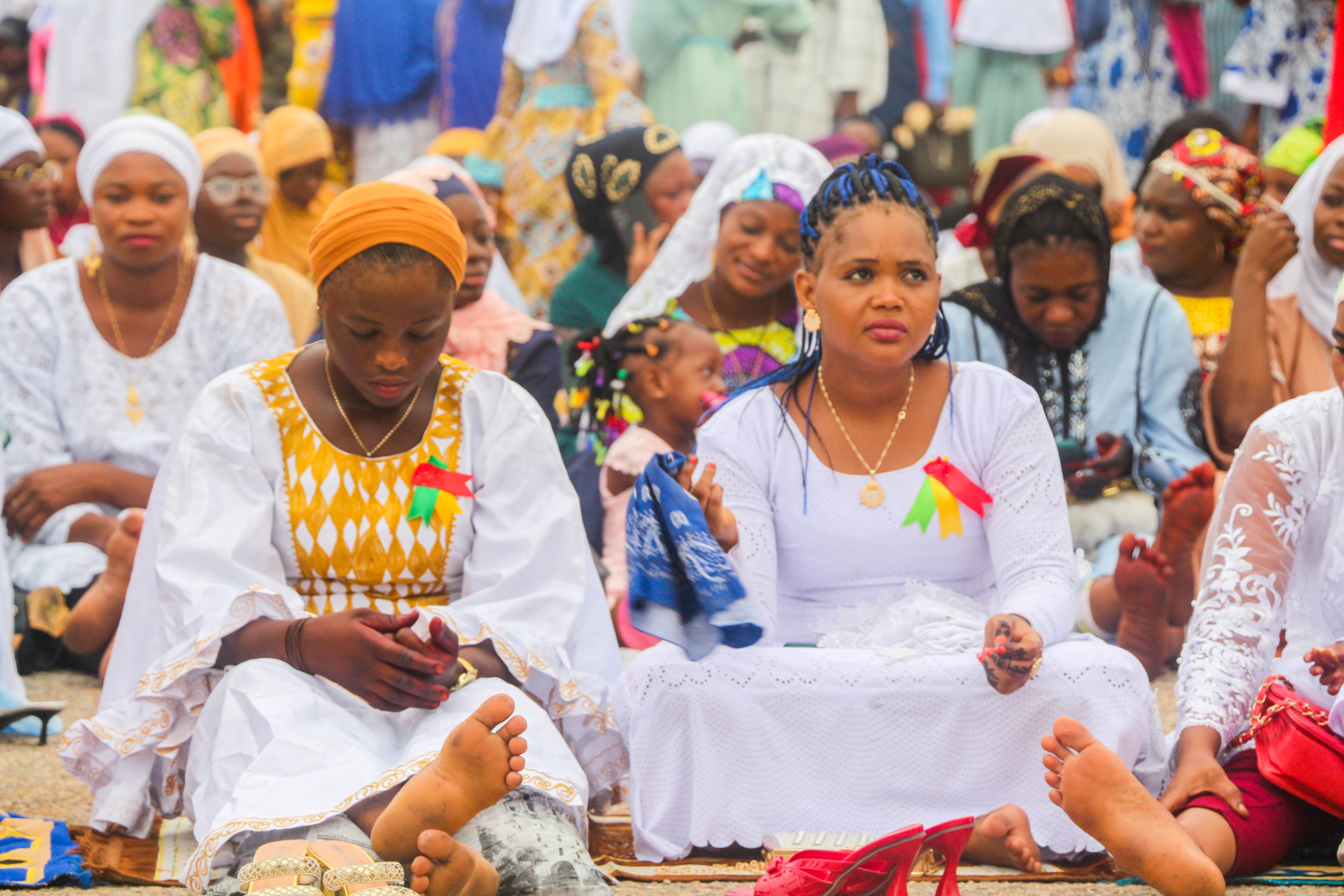
Eid ul Fitr 2024 prayers at Blackstar Square in Ghana

Eid al-Fitr is widely observed by Muslims in Ghana through prayers, charitable acts, and family gatherings.

==== Egypt ====
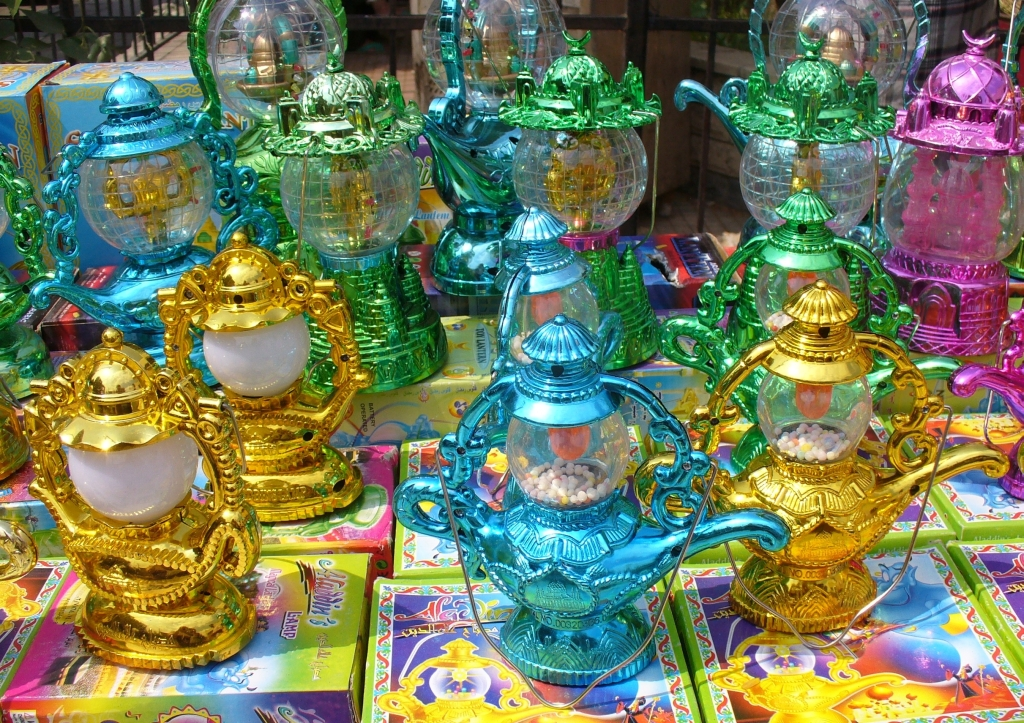
Colorful Ramadan lanterns (fanous) at a souk in Egypt

Egyptians spend the first day of Eid al-Fitr to gather all family members and celebrate the Eid at public gardens. It is customary for children to also receive an Eidi, a small sum of money to be spent on activities throughout the Eid. Egyptians like to celebrate with others, so the streets are always crowded during the days and nights of Eid.

==== Nigeria ====
Eid is popularly known as Small Sallah in Nigeria. During the day, people generally greet each other by saying Barka Da Sallah, which when translated means "Greetings on Sallah" in the Hausa language. The celebrations last as long as three days.

==== Tunisia ====
Tunisia celebrates Eid for three days (with preparations starting several days earlier), two of which are national holidays. Special Sweets and biscuits, including Baklava and several kinds of "ka'ak", marzipan, cookies are made or bought to give to friends and relatives on the day. kids receive gifts from parents and elderly relatives, usually money or even toys. They also invite close friends and relatives for the Eid dinner. After Eid dinner people love to sing and dance.

==== Tanzania ====
Muslims in Tanzania celebrate Eid al-Fitr, when they normally dress in fine clothes and decorate their homes with lights. Special foods are prepared and shared with family and visitors, while children receive gifts. In Zanzibar it is popular for locals to buy new clothing, while women would shop for handbags, necklaces and other clothing. For some youngsters Eid nights involve dancing at a club. Children would receive coins of money from locals.

==== South Africa ====
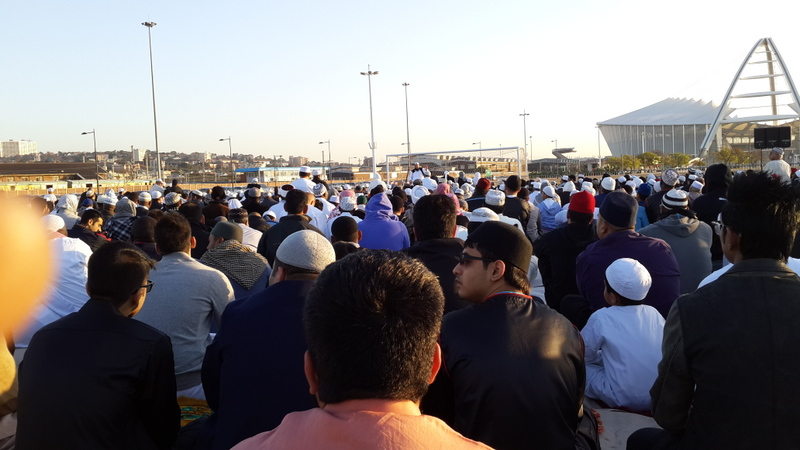
Muslims in Durban during Eid al-Fitr prayers

In Cape Town, hundreds of Muslims—each with something to share with others at the time of the breaking of the fast—gather at Green Point in the evening of the last day of Ramadan for the sighting of the moon. The Maghrib (sunset) prayer is then performed in congregation and the formal moon-sighting results are announced thereafter.

==== Morocco ====
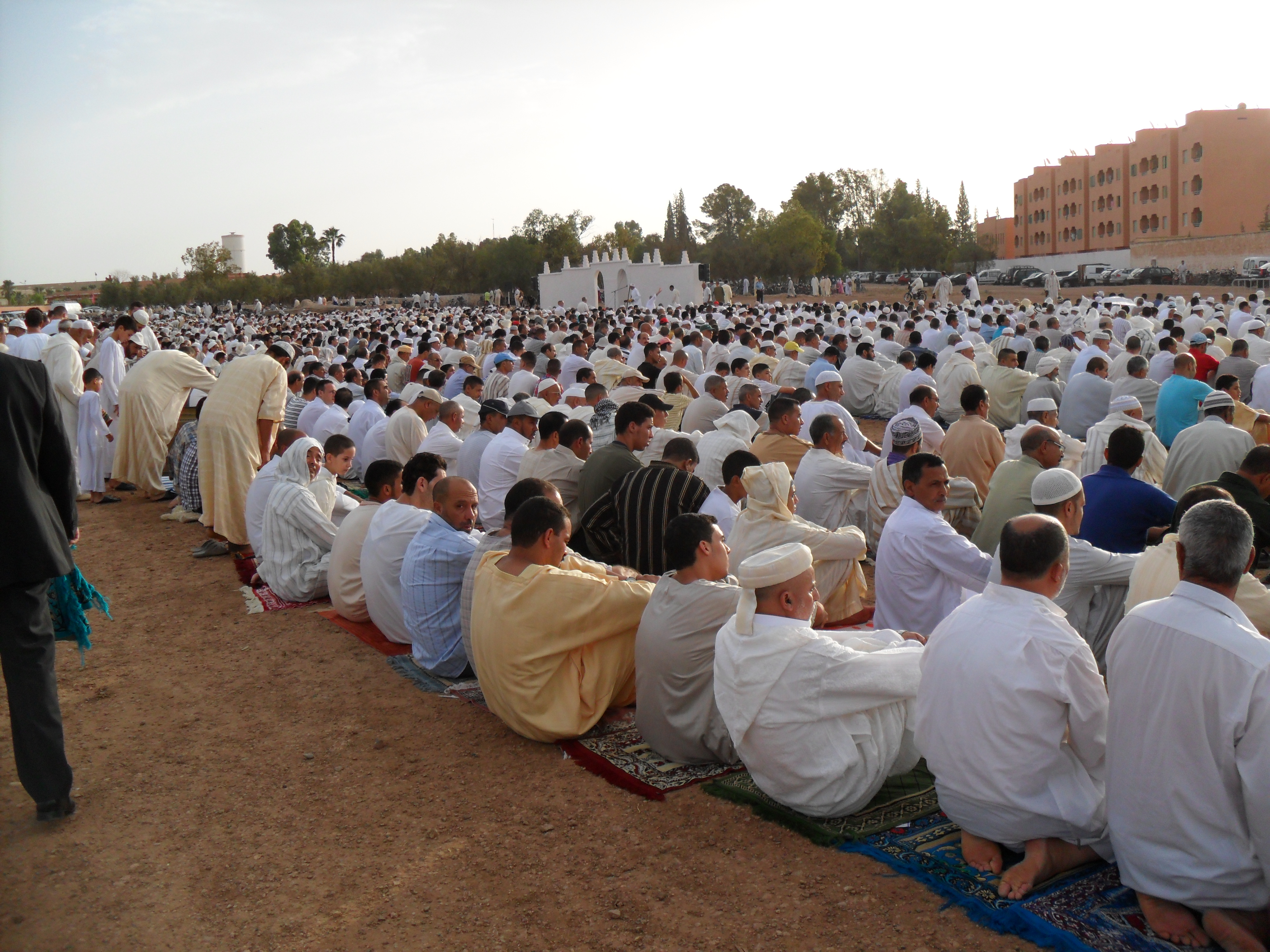
Eid al-Fitr mass prayer in Morocco

Eid es-Seghir is the name of Eid al-Fitr among Moroccans. Many families have a tradition of buying new clothes for their children during the holiday. Common food choices for eid dinner include couscous, lamb or beef brochettes and others. In the north, musicians play Andalusian music accompanied by fast clapping.

==== Ethiopia ====
Eid is an important event for Muslims in Ethiopia, who form the largest Muslim community in East Africa.

==== Sudan ====
In Sudan, where 97% of the population is Muslim, preparations for Eid begin the last few days of Ramadan. For days, ka'ak (sugar powdered cookies), bettifour (dry baked goods including dainty biscuits, baked meringues and macaroons—whose name are derived from the French petit four), and popcorn are baked in large batches to serve to guests and to give to family and friends; dressy Eid clothes are either shopped for or sewn; girls and women decorate their hands and feet with henna; and parts of the house may even be painted. The night before Eid, the whole household partakes in cleaning the house and yard and setting out the finest bedsheets, table cloths, and decorations. On the day of Eid, men and boys (and occasionally women and girls) will attend the Eid prayer. For the next 3 days, families will then visit each other, extended family, neighbors, and close friends. In these short visits, the baked goods, chocolates, and sweets are served, and often large lunches are prepared for the visiting well-wishers. Children are given gifts, either in the form of toys or money.

==== Somalia ====
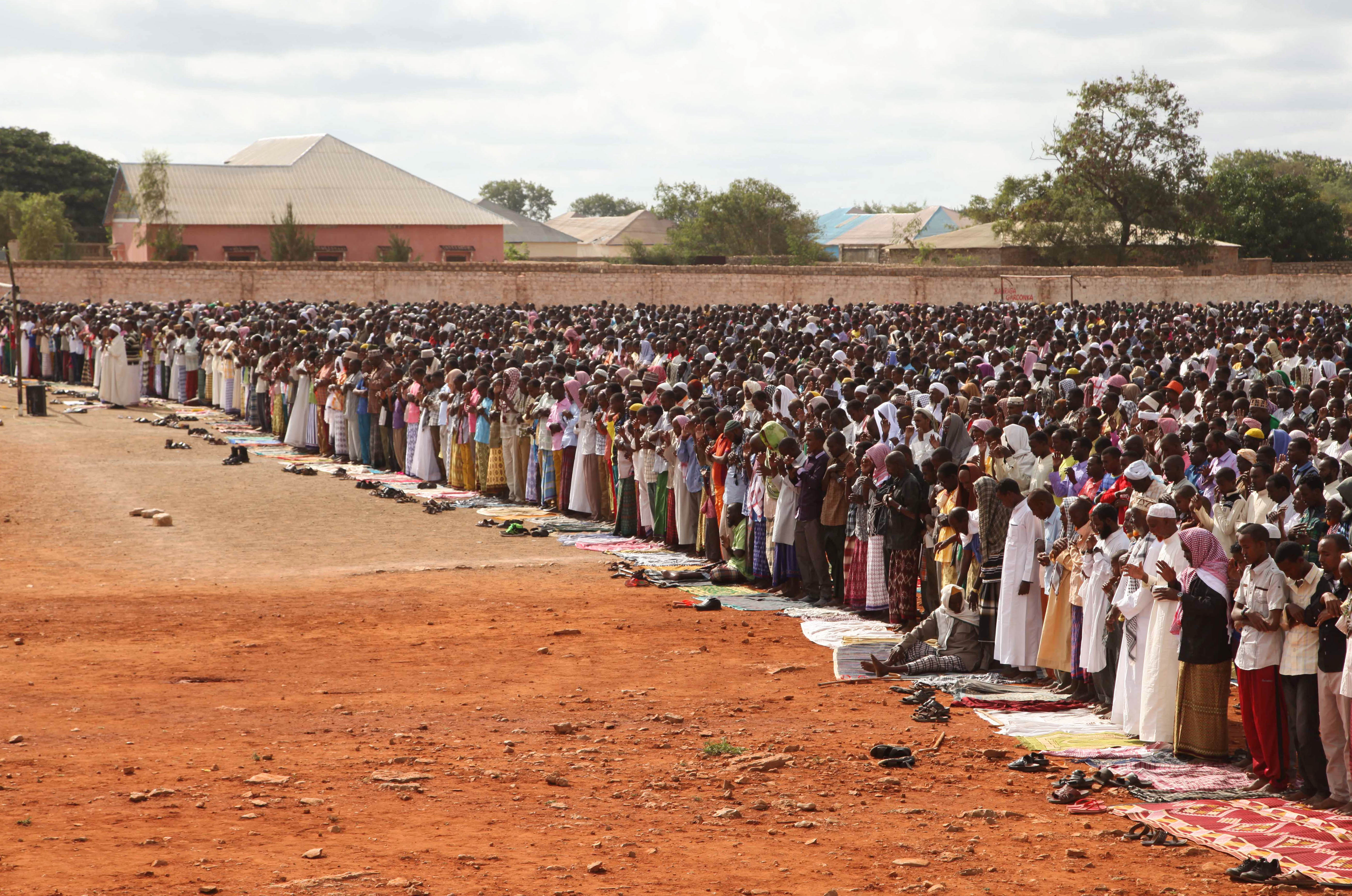
Eid al-Fitr prayers in Baidoa, Somalia

In Somalia and other Islamic parts of the Horn region, Eid al-Fitr is observed by the Muslim communities. Celebrations marking the event are typically accompanied by elaborate banquets, where special dishes such as xalwo (halwo) and buskut (buskuit) are served.

==== Senegal ====
The holiday is widely called Korité in Senegal and elsewhere across West Africa. It is a national holiday, celebrated for three days, with families normally having new clothes made for the holiday. Gifts and donations are normally exchanged.

==== Ivory Coast ====
In the Ivory Coast, Eid is a large feast among Muslims. The celebration lasts between two and ten days depending on region.

==== Sierra Leone ====
Sierra Leone celebrates Eid over three days, with the first marking the end of Ramadan. Following a religious service, the country practices gift exchanges. The country also hosts a parade for Eid which involves creating and carrying large lanterns.

=== Central Asia ===
==== Tajikistan ====
In Tajikistan the holiday is known as Idi Ramazon and is a national holiday.

==== Kyrgyzstan ====
In Kyrgyzstan the day is known as Orozo Ait (Kyrgyz: Орозо айт). The local population celebrate in various ways such as by partying, eating and singing. Festivals often feature long distance horse racing and other horse-based sports. People would tend to wear fancy and bright clothes, while people would sing Jaramazan tunes and receive cooked bread, candy or cash in return.

==== Uzbekistan ====
Ramazon Hayit or Roʻza hayiti is a public holiday in Uzbekistan and widely celebrated. Traditional pastry such as kush-tili, plov and chak-chak are prepared by Uzbek families the day before Eid al-Fitr for consumption. Businesses tend to sell a high range of candies and children's toys during this period.

==== Kazakhstan ====
Known as Oraza Ait (Ораза айт) Kazakh Muslims tend to visit each other during the celebration and handing out fried doughnuts such as baursaki to others. However mutton, soup, tea and kymyz (horse milk) are also popular food and drinks during the holiday.

==== Afghanistan ====
An Afghan child eating a piece of candy received as a gift on Eid al-Fitr

In the predominantly Sunni Muslim culture of Afghanistan, Eid al-Fitr holds significant importance and is celebrated widely for three days. It popularly involves special festivities for children and the youngest members of families. The most common greeting is Akhtar mo Mubarak sha (Eid Mubarak) in the Pashto-speaking community. Afghans start preparing for the Eid al-Fitr festival up to ten days prior by cleaning their homes (called Khana Takani in Dari). Afghans visit their local bazaars to buy new clothes, sweets, and snacks including Jalebi, Shor-Nakhod (made with chickpeas), Cake wa Kolcha (a simple cake, similar to pound cake). The traditional Bolani (vegetarian flatbreads) is a popular meal during Eid al-Fitr in Afghanistan.

On the day of Eid al-Fitr, Afghans will first offer their Eid prayers and then gather in their homes with their families, greeting one another by saying "Eid Mubarak" and usually adding "Eidet Mobarak Roza wa Namazet Qabool Dakhel Hajiha wa Ghaziha," which means "Happy Eid to you; may your fasting and prayers be accepted by God, and may you be counted among those who will go to the Hajj-pilgrimage." Family elders will give money and gifts to children. It is also common practice to visit families and friends, which may be difficult to do at other times of the year. Children walk from home to home saying "Khala Eidet Mubarak" ("aunt happy Eid"), and they receive cookies or Pala. Young girls and women apply henna "tattoo"s on their hands and feet. The older women while applying it too, don't do very complicated designs. The boys and young men in some communities might apply it as well but, with very simple designs like a circle in their palms or just coloring the fingertips. The older men might do those simple designs as well, but it is not that common. Henna is a "woman's" thing in Afghanistan when it comes to doing designs on their hands and feet. At night, multiple campfires are set around houses, sometimes to the point that entire valleys may initially appear to be engulfed in flame. Celebratory fire with automatic rifles, particularly tracer rounds, can also be expected in high density.

=== South Asia ===
==== Bangladesh ====
South Asia's largest Eid-ul-Fitr Congregation held in Gor-e-Shahid Boro Math, Dinajpur, Bangladesh.

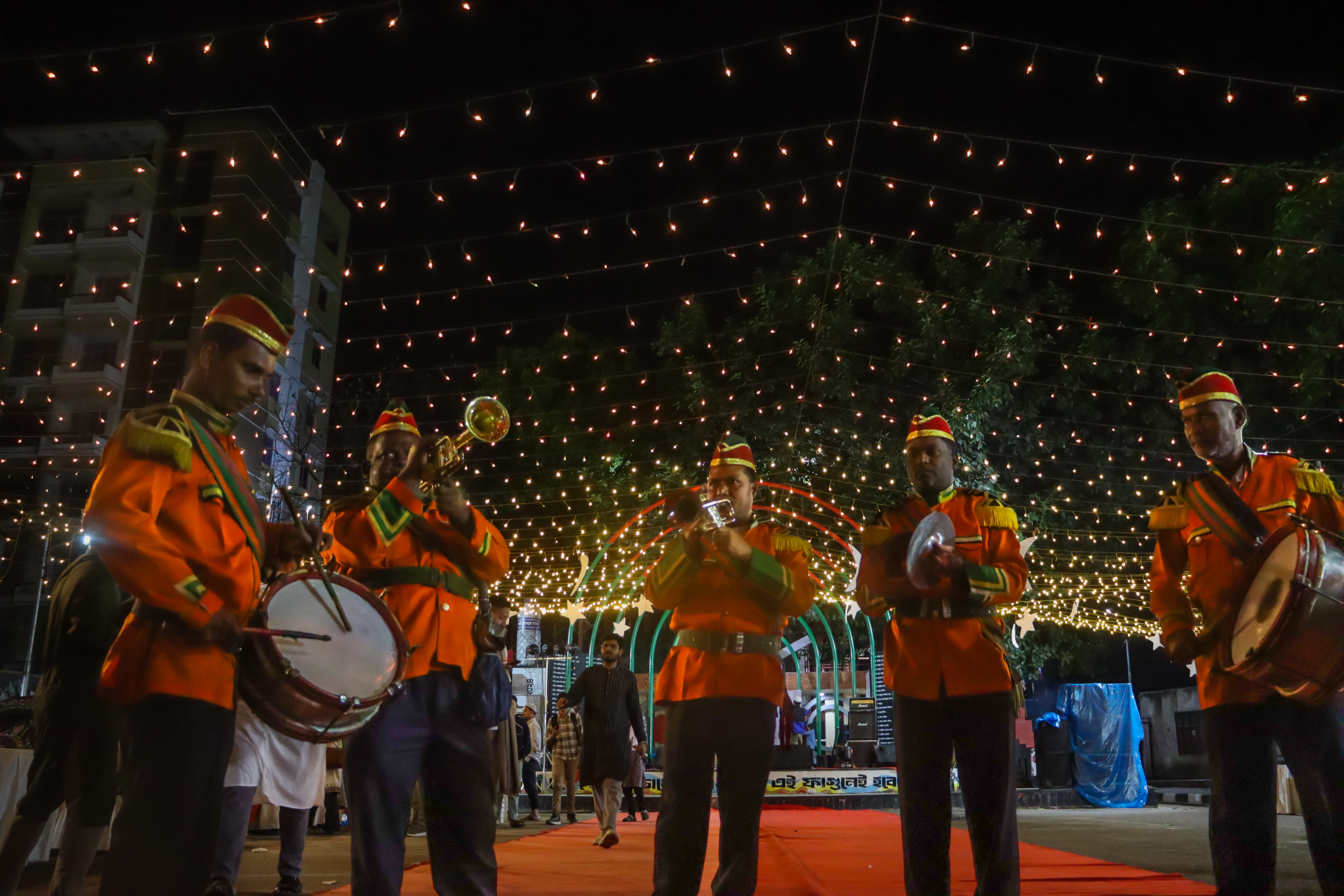
Eid al-fitr festival at the Mugdho Mancha, Dhaka in 2026

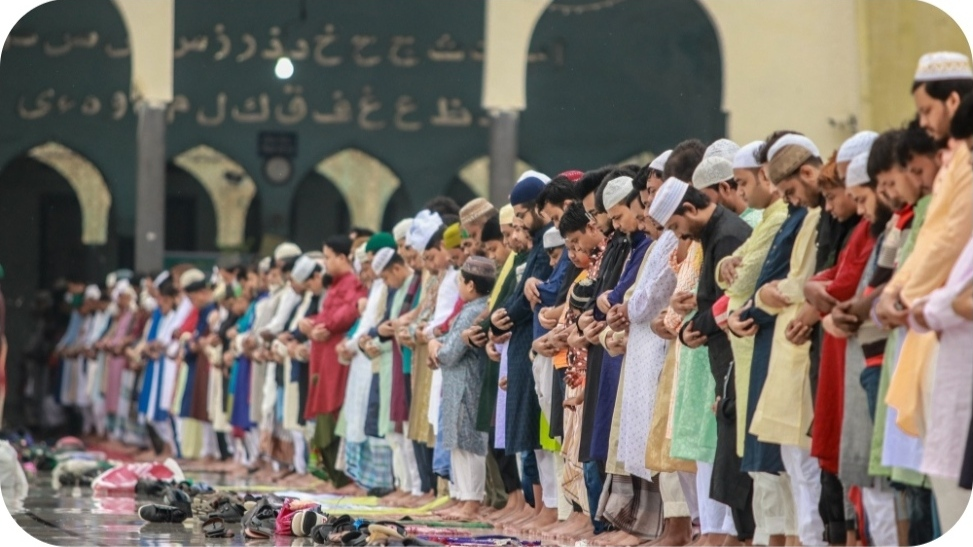
Eid prayers at Baitul Mukarram in Dhaka, Bangladesh

In Bangladesh, Eid al-Fitr (Bengali: ঈদুল ফিতর, romanized: Īdul phitôr) is also colloquially known as Rozar Eid (Bengali: রোজার ঈদ, romanized: Rôjār īd, lit. 'Eid of Fasting'), whch is a public holiday in the country. The preparation for Eid in Bangladesh starts from the last quarter of Ramadan. The markets and shopping malls become overwhelmed with people. A large number of people living away return home to celebrate the festival with family members and relatives.

The night before Eid al-Fitr is known as the Chaand Raat. Children often gather at the open space to see the crescent of the month of Shawwal. Girls decorate their hands with Mehendi. A popular culture of Bangladesh include playing Bengali Eid song "O Mon Romzaner Oi Rozar Sheshe" on the Chaand Raat. Children also make and exchange Eid cards.

In the morning of Eid al-Fitr, sweet dishes including Shemai (vermicelli) with Roti or Paratha or Luchi are served. The males, generally, go to Eidgahs to perform the Eid prayer. Some major Eidgahs in the country include Sholakia (Kishoreganj), which holds a record of hosting the largest congregation, and Gor-E-Shahid (Dinajpur) which is considered as the largest eidgah and Dhanmondi Shahi (Dhaka), said to be the oldest surviving Mughal architecture of Dhaka. Wealthy Muslims also distribute Zakat alms to the poor people. Children greet elders by touching their feet, a tradition known as Salam. In exchange, elders give them a small amount of money, known as Salami or Eidi. People visit the house of relatives, neighbour, and friends and greet each other saying Eid Mubarak. Dishes served in the day include Biryani, Polao, Pitha, Kabab, Korma, Chingri Malaikari, Shorshe Ilish, Payesh, Shirni, Halwa. In rural Bangladesh, unmarried girls would draw butterflies on the Pithas, which has long been recognised by the Bengalis as a symbol of marriage.

The tradition of Eid procession can be traced back to the Mughal era of Old Dhaka. In rural Bangladesh, folk sports competitions are organised on the occasion of Eid. On the second day of Eid, the longest running magazine show Ityadi is aired in Bangladesh Television, which celebrates the Bengali culture and brings education into light.

==== India ====
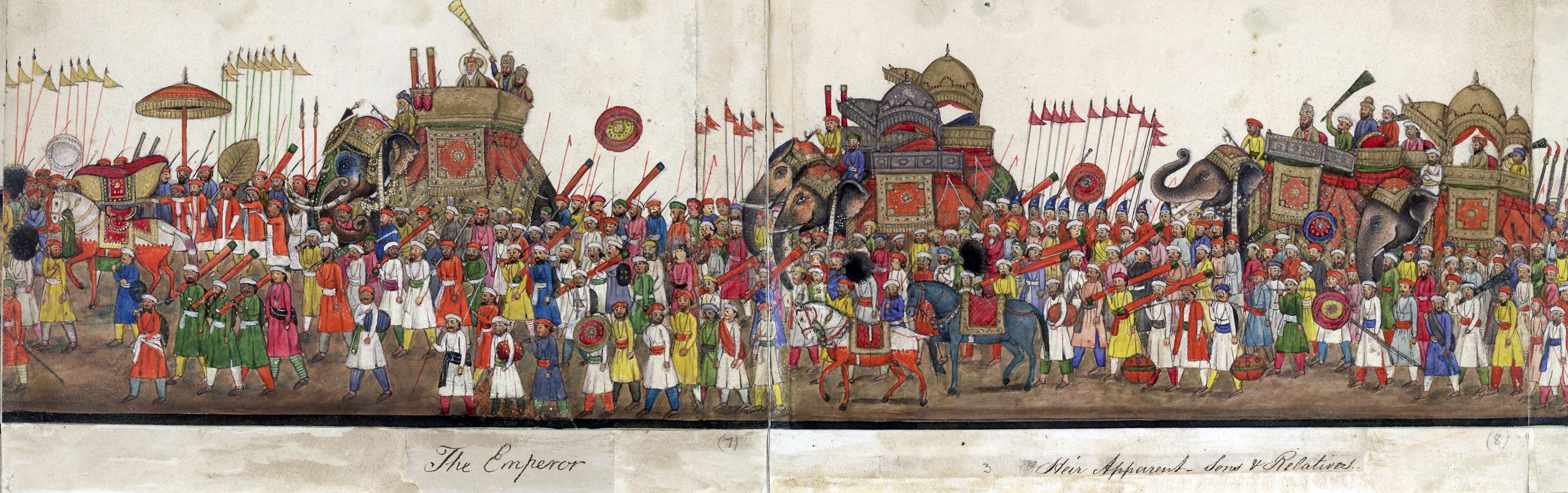
A panorama in 12 folds showing an imperial Eid al-Fitr procession by Bahadur Shah Zafar (Delhi, Mughal Empire, now India)

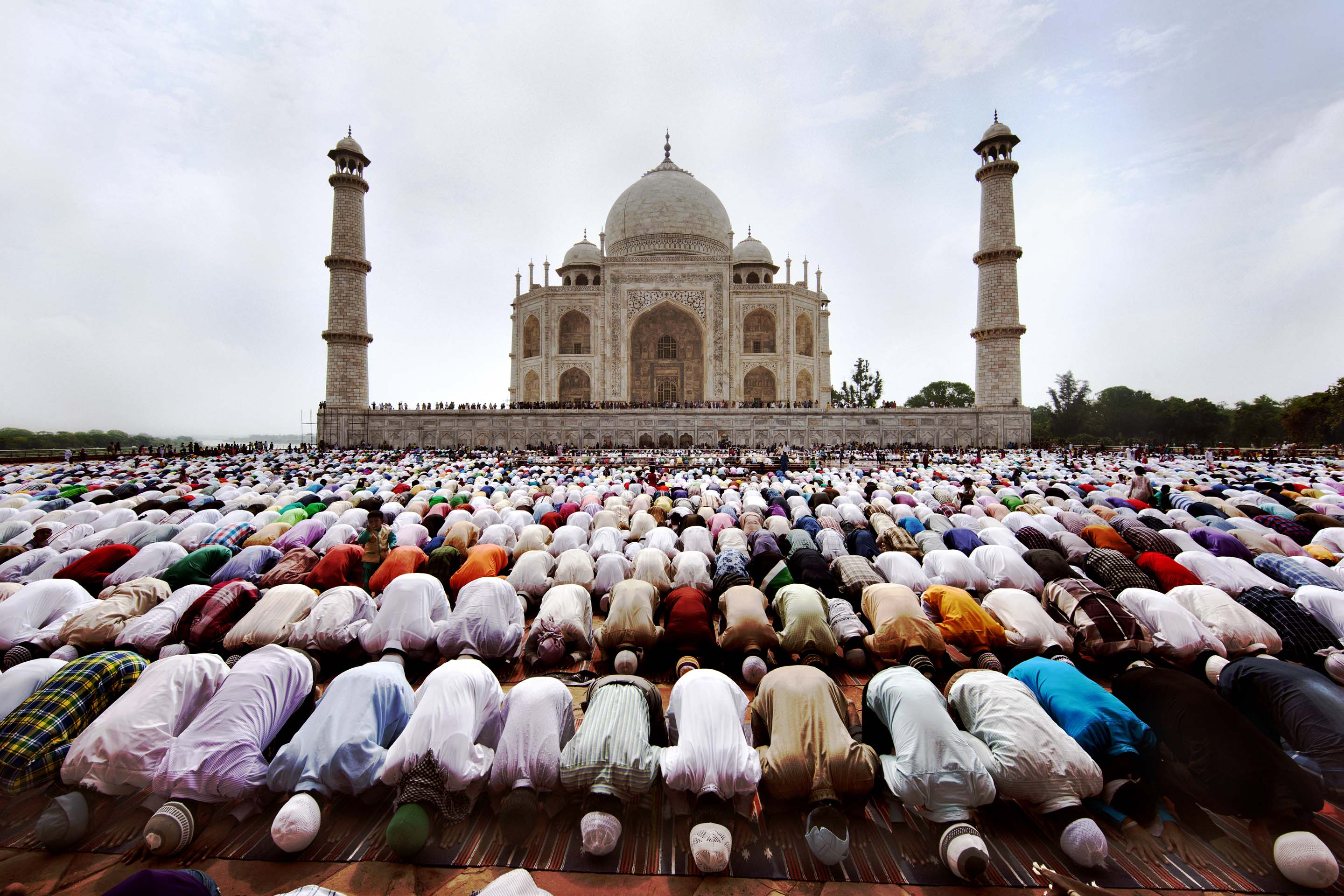
Indian Muslims offering their 'Eid al-Fitr' prayer at the Taj Mahal, Agra, India

Eid is a public holiday in India. The holiday begins after the sighting of the new moon on Chand Raat. On that evening, people head to markets to finish their shopping for Eid, for clothing and gifts, and begin preparing their food for the next day. Traditional Eid food often includes biriyani, sheer khurma, and sivayyan, a dish of fine, toasted sweet vermicelli noodles with milk and dried fruit, among other regionally-specific dishes. Women and girls also put henna on each other's hands. In the following morning, Muslims go to their local mosque or Eidgah for Eid Namaz and give Eid zakat before returning home. Afterwards, children are given Eidi (cash gifts) and friends and relatives visit each other's homes to eat and celebrate.

==== Pakistan ====
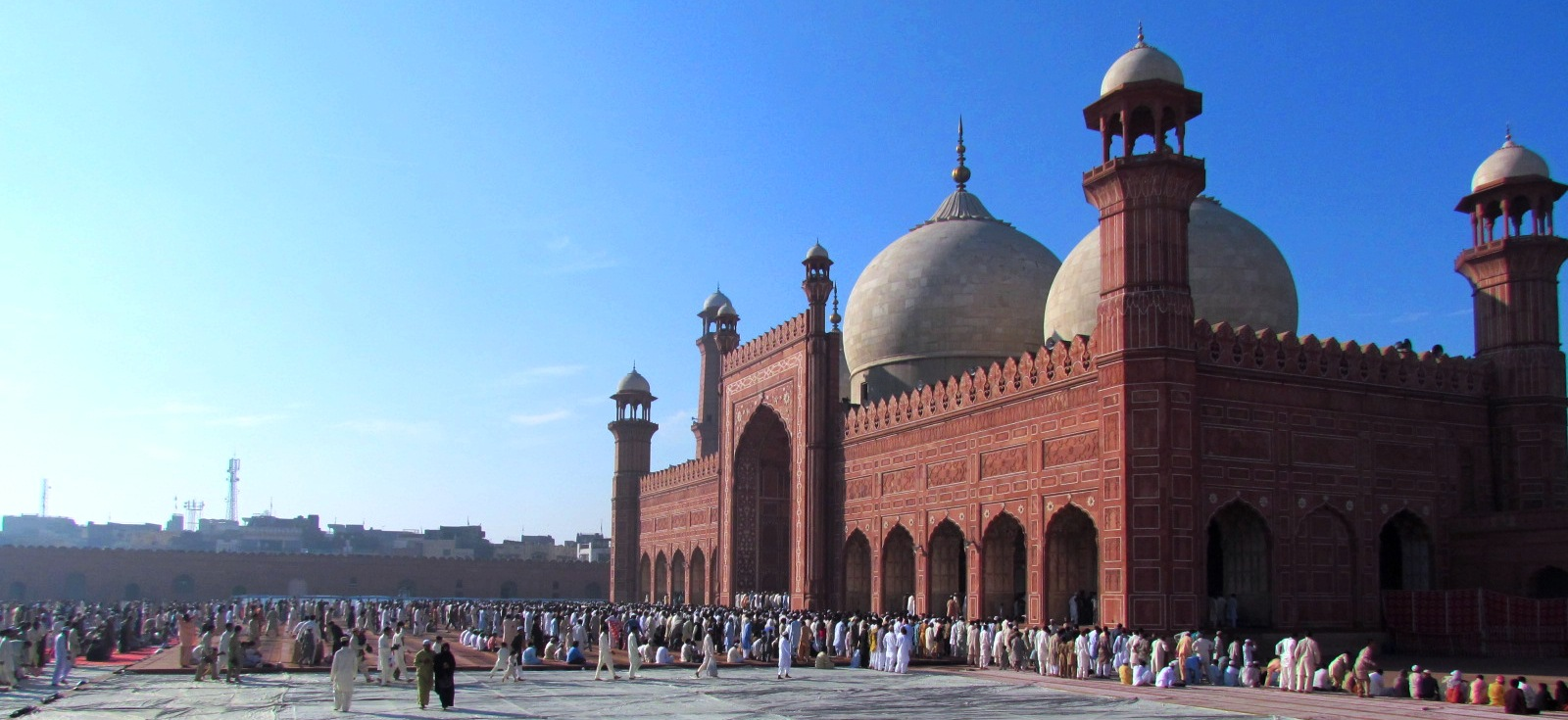
Eid prayers at Badshahi Mosque, in Lahore, Pakistan

In Pakistan, Eid al-Fitr is also referred to as 'the Lesser Eid' (Urdu: چھوٹی عید, chhoṭī īd, Punjabi: نکی عید, nikkī īd) or 'Sweet Eid' (Urdu: میٹھی عید, mīṭhī īd, Punjabi: مٹھی عید, miṭṭhī īd). People are supposed to give obligatory charity on behalf of each of their family members to the needy or poor before Eid day or, at most, before the Eid prayer, allowing for all to share in the joy of Eid. At home, family members enjoy a special Eid breakfast with various types of sweets and desserts, including Kheer and the traditional dessert sheer khurma, which is made of vermicelli, milk, butter, dry fruits, and dates. Eid is especially enjoyed by the kids, as they receive money in cash called "Eidi" as gift from their relatives and elders. People tend to get fresh currency notes issued by State Bank of Pakistan with which they give to the children.

==== Sri Lanka ====
Sri Lankan Muslims like to eat watalappam, falooda, samosa, gulab jamun, sheer kurma, oil cake and other national and regional dishes.

==== Nepal ====
Eid is a national holiday in Nepal. Nepalese Muslims often consume the popular Nepalese dessert sewai (vermicelli pudding) to mark the occasion. It is commemorated throughout the country with large prayers, dinners and social celebrations.

==== Maldives ====
Celebration in the Maldives include cultural performances.

=== Southeast Asia ===
==== Indonesia ====
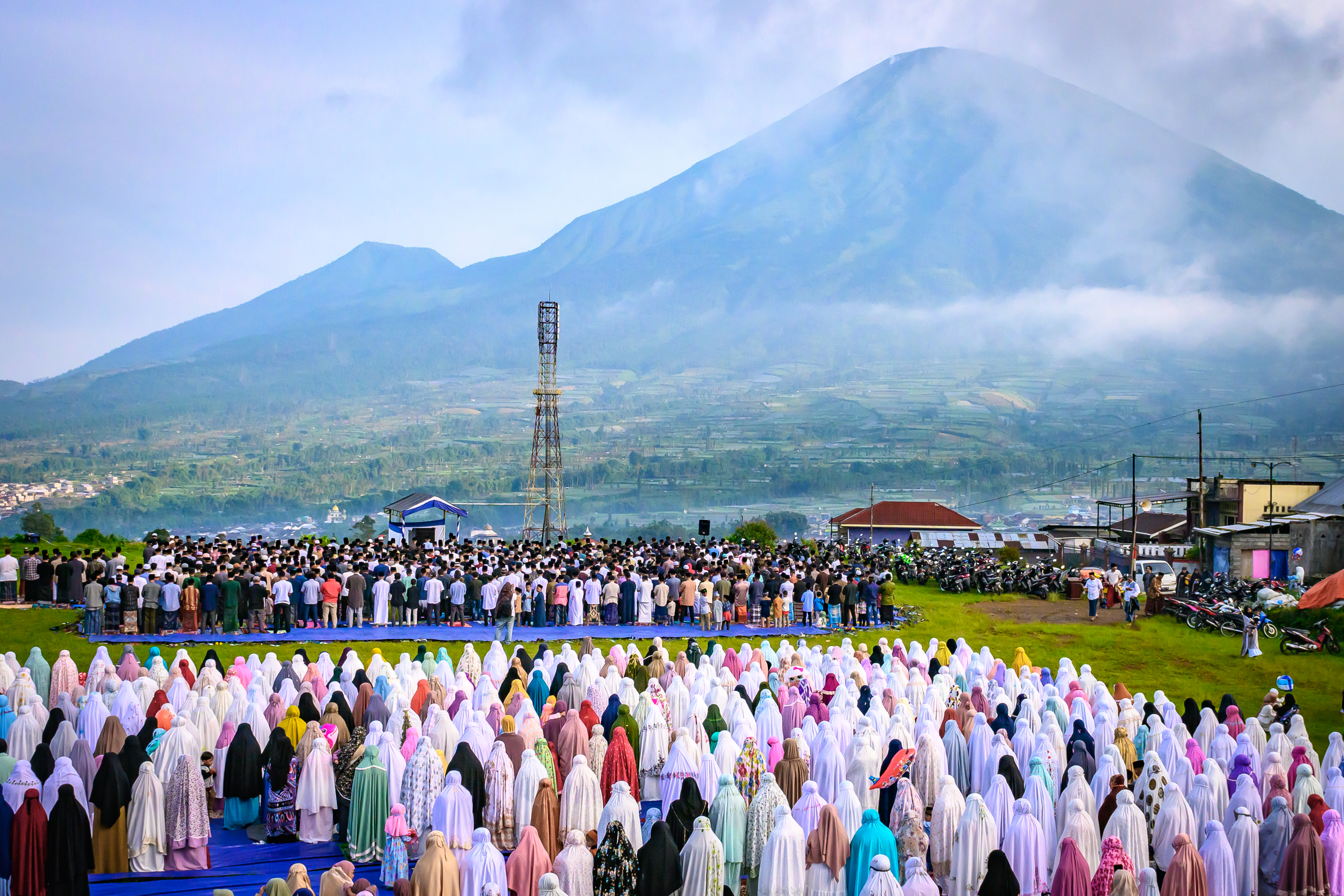
Eid al-Fitr prayers on the slopes of Mount Sumbing and Sindoro, precisely at Garung Field, Butuh, Kalikajar District, Wonosobo Regency, Central Java, Indonesia.

Eid is known in Indonesia as Hari Raya Idul Fitri, Idul Fitri, or more popularly as Lebaran, and is a national holiday. People return to their home town or city (a homecoming exodus known as mudik) to celebrate with their families and to ask forgiveness from parents, in-laws, and other elders. Festivities start the night before with chanting the Takbir, lighting lamps, and often celebrated with fireworks and street parades. On the day itself, before Eid prayer in the morning, zakat alms are distributed in the mosques, prioritized to be given for the poor. People gather with family and neighbors in traditional clothing and have a special Lebaran meal, which are special dishes include ketupat, rendang, opor ayam and gulai. Many, usually children, are given money in colorful envelopes. Later, it is common for Muslims in Indonesia to visit the graves of relatives that have deceased to ritually clean the grave. Muslims also attend mass gathering in a special tradition called Halal bi-Halal, sometime during or several days after Idul Fitri.

==== Malaysia, Singapore, and Brunei ====
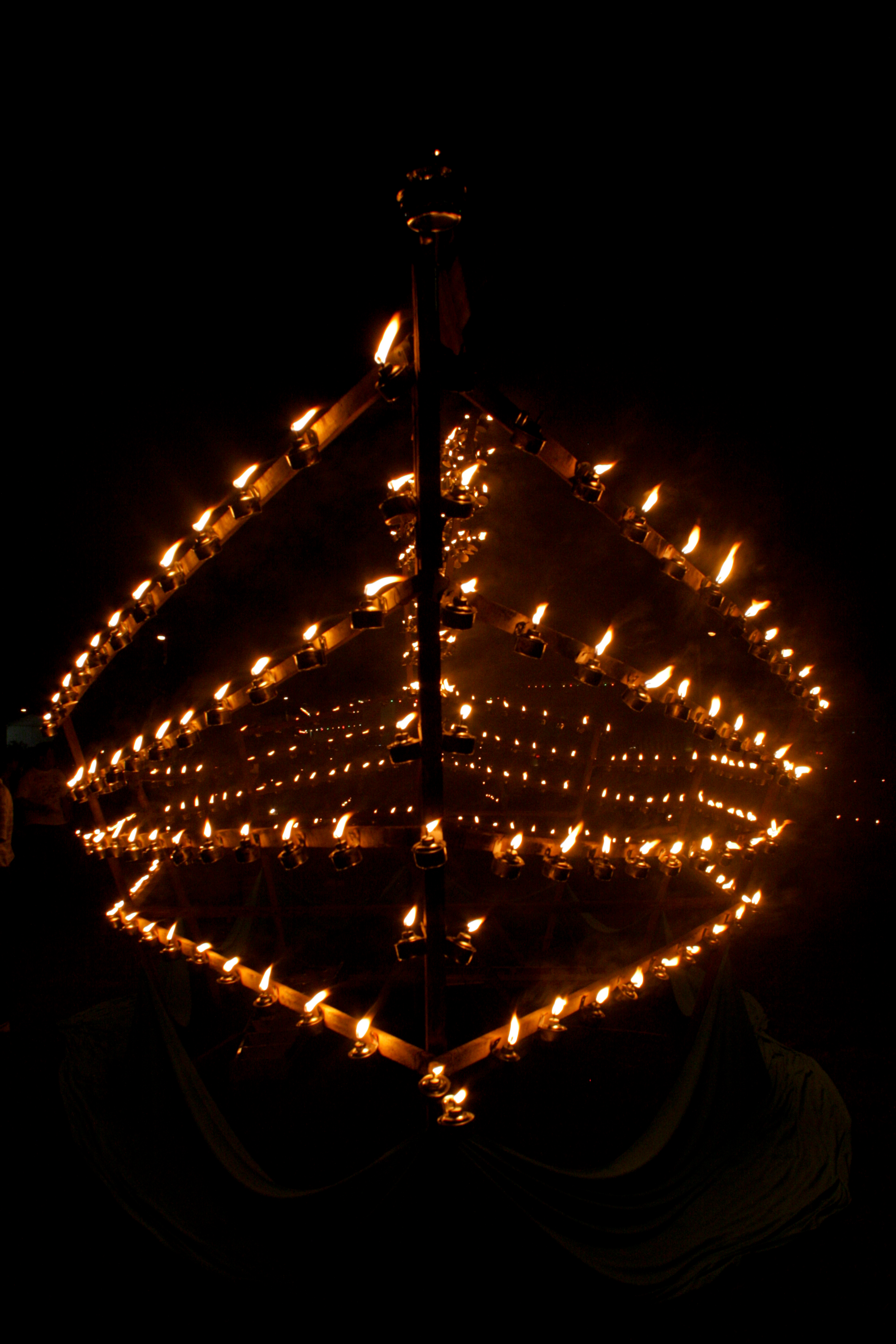
Rows of Pelita (oil lamps) which is used to illuminate homes and the streets during the season. Seen here in Muar, Johor, Malaysia

In Malaysia, Singapore, and Brunei, Eid is more commonly known as Hari Raya Aidilfitri (Jawi: هاري راي عيدالفطري), Hari Raya Idul Fitri, Hari Raya Puasa, Hari Raya Fitrah, Hari Lebaran and sometimes Aidilfitri. Hari Raya means 'Great Day'.

It is customary for workers in the city to return to their home town to celebrate with their families and to ask forgiveness from parents, in-laws, and other elders. Forgiveness is often requested without citing any specific error to avoid arguments. This is known in Malaysia as balik kampung (homecoming).

The night before Hari Raya is filled with the sounds of takbir in the mosques or musallas. In many parts of Malaysia, especially in the rural areas, pelita or panjut or lampu colok (as known by Malay-Singaporeans) (oil lamps, similar to tiki torches) are lit up and placed outside and around homes, while tiki torches themselves are also a popular decoration for that holiday. Special dishes like ketupat, rendang, lemang (a type of glutinous rice cooked in bamboo) and Malay delicacies such as various kuih-muih are served during this day. It is common to greet people with "Salam Aidilfitri" or "Selamat Hari Raya" which means "Happy Eid". Muslims also greet one another with "maaf zahir dan batin", which means "Forgive my physical and emotional (wrongdoings)".

It is customary for Muslim-Malaysians to wear a traditional cultural clothing on Hari Raya. The Malay variant (worn in Malaysia, Singapore, Brunei and Southern Thailand) is known as the Baju Melayu, shirt worn with a sarong known as kain samping or songket and a headwear known as songkok. Malaysian women's clothing is referred to as Baju Kurung and baju kebaya. It is a common practice however for the Malays in Singapore and Johor, Malaysia to refer to the baju kurung in reference to the type of outfit, worn by both men and women.

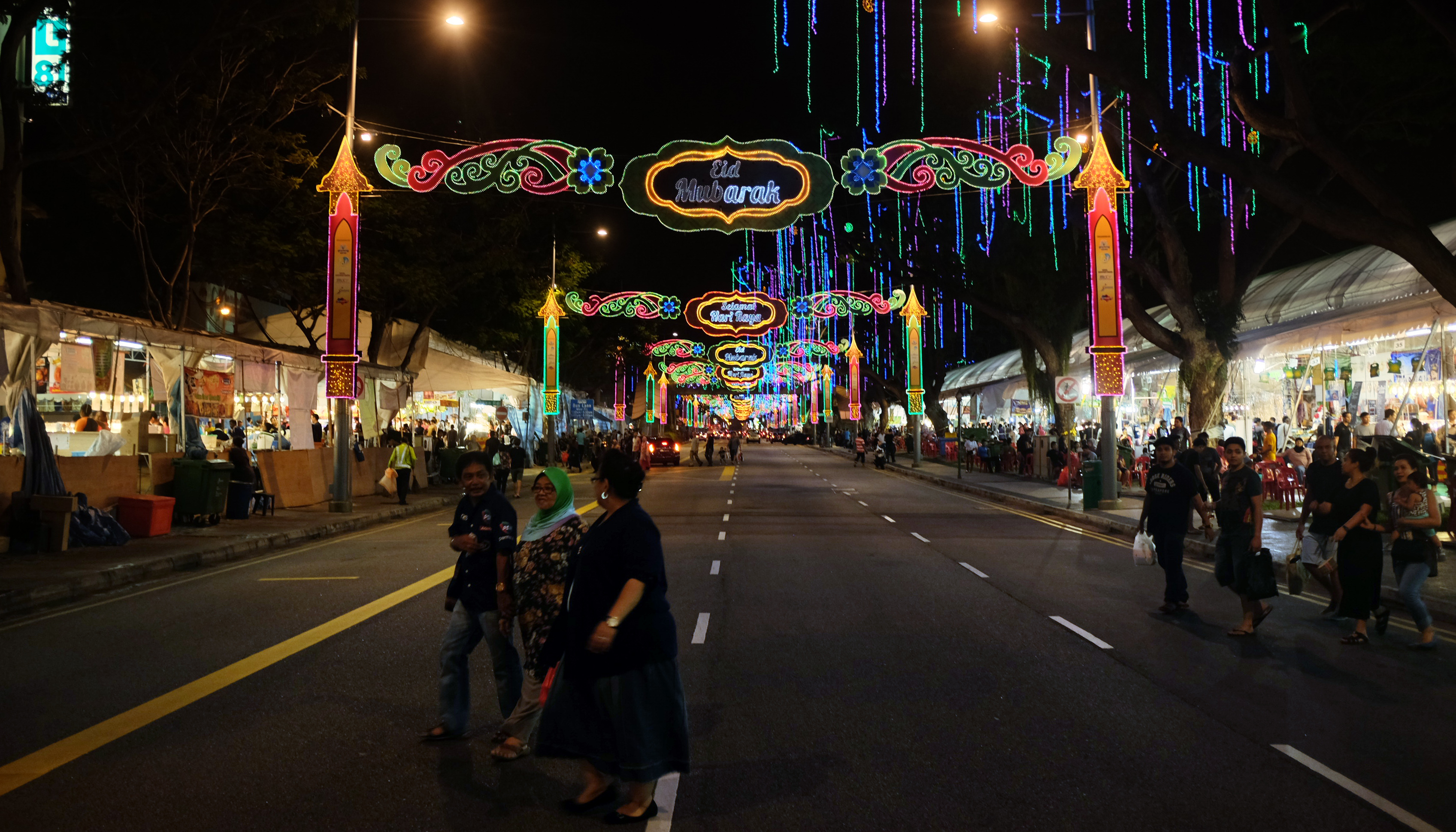
Street festival during Eid in Geylang, Singapore

In Malaysia, especially in the major cities, people take turns to set aside a time for open house when they stay at home to receive and entertain neighbours, family and other visitors. It is common to see non-Muslims made welcome during Eid at these open houses. They also celebrate by lighting traditional bamboo cannon firecrackers known as meriam buluh, using kerosene in large hollow bamboo tubes or Chinese imported crackers. The traditional bamboo cannon, meriam buloh, and fireworks are notoriously loud and can be very dangerous to operator, bystander and even nearby buildings. These are usually bamboo tubes 5–10 cm (2.0–3.9 in) in diameter and 4–7 m (13–23 ft) long, filled with either: water and several hundred grams of calcium carbide, or heated kerosene, then ignited by match.

In Malaysia, children are given token sums of money, also known as "duit raya", from their parents or elders.

==== Brunei ====
In Brunei, a special centrepiece is made to coming guests by young ladies of the family called the kepala meja ('head of the table') where a decorated cake is presented so any man who wished to propose and take her in marriage would cut the cake in response. Here is also where special dishes unique to this country are served, such as kelupis with prawn or tahai (smoked sardinella) sambal and curry.

==== Thailand ====
There are almost 3 million Muslims in Thailand. In the southernmost provinces, wearing gold on Eid is a popular practice there along with neighbouring Myanmar. In some parts of the country, Muslim residences would open their homes with food specialities to visitors.

==== Cambodia, Laos and Vietnam ====
The Chams constituted the bulk of the Muslim population in both Cambodia, Laos and Vietnam, especially in Cambodia and Vietnam where they are located mainly, and the Eid is also known as "Roya Haji", "Roya Haji Aidil Fitri", "Hari Raya Aidilfitri", or "Roya Eidul Fitri", among the Muslims there.

Muslims of Cambodia often open their homes to friends and neighbours to share food together. Men, women and children dress in fine attire, while the preferred dress colour is white, symbolising the purity of the soul after a month of Ramadan. It is customary during Eid for Cambodian Muslims to donate 3 kilograms of rice to the poor or disabled.

Eid is also celebrated by the much smaller Muslim community of Vietnam, which makes up less than 0.1% of the population. The Muslim community in Vietnam are mostly of the same ethnic as the Cham people.

Eid al-Fitr in Laos is also celebrated by the Muslim community, including Chams, Pakistani, Malay, and expatriate Muslims. In cities like Vientiane and Savannakhet, Muslims gather for Eid prayers, followed by communal meals and Zakat al-Fitr. Traditional spiced rice dishes and grilled meats are shared, making the celebration a modest yet meaningful occasion that fosters unity and cultural diversity.

==== Myanmar ====
During Ramadan, in small towns and big villages with significant Muslim populations, Burmese Muslim youth organize singing teams called Jago (meaning "wake up"). Jago teams usually do not use musical instruments apart from the occasional use of harmonica mouth organs. The roving groups of singers will take the tunes of popular Hindi movie songs, replaced with Burmese lyrics and invocations about fasting, the principles of Islam, and the benefits of Salat.

==== Philippines ====
Among Muslim Filipinos in the Philippines, Eid al-Fitr is commonly known as Hariraya, Buka, Hariraya Buka, or Hariraya Buka Puasa. "Eid al-" is often replaced with Eid'l in the country's local English variant. It is also known as Wakas ng Ramadan (lit. "End of Ramadan"), Araw ng Raya ("Feast Day"), or Pagtatapos ng Pag-aayuno ("End of the Fast") in Filipino. It was proclaimed a legal holiday for Muslim Filipinos in 1977 by Presidential Decree No. 1083. In 2002, this was upgraded to a public national holiday by Republic Act No. 9177. It is also sometimes known by its Malay name "Hari Raya Puasa"; and by its Indonesian name "Lebaran".

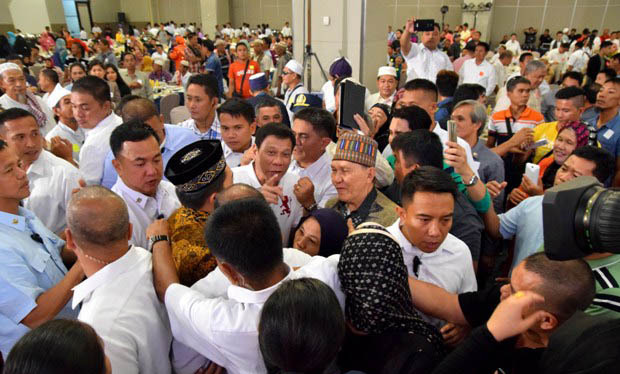
President Rodrigo Duterte interacts with participants of the 2016 Eid al-Fitr celebrations in Davao City, Philippines.

Its beginning is decided by the sighting of the crescent moon (hilal), followed by morning prayers in mosques or public plazas. When this occurs can sometimes differ depending on the regional government. In some places it is based on the physical sighting of the hilal; while in others it is determined by the Regional Darul Ifta' of Bangsamoro (RDI-BARMM) or the National Commission on Muslim Filipinos (NCMF), especially during cloudy days.

The sighting of the hilal is traditionally marked by the beating of drums in some regions. In modern times, this has evolved into a noise barrage known as "Mobile Takbir", where celebrants, especially youths, rev their motorcycles or honk their horns while driving through the streets. Guns are also sometimes fired. These practices have been discouraged by the Grand Mufti of Bangsamoro and local government officials as not being in accordance with Islamic teachings as well as being dangerous and causing accidents in the past.

Hariraya is characterized by the giving of gifts (known as Eid), food sharing (salu-salo), and visiting the elderly and the sick. Food, alms, and basic necessities are also donated to the poor, a practice known as Fitrana or Zakat al-Fitr. This is usually done a day before Eid al-Fitr. Various traditional sweet delicacies of the different Muslim Filipino ethnic groups are served for breakfast, including daral, dodol, browas, tinagtag, panyalam, jampok, and so on. Various activities also mark the celebrations, including dancing, boat races, horse races, and carabao fighting in cities and towns with significant Muslim populations. In Metro Manila, the celebrations are usually held at the Manila Golden Mosque and the Quirino Grandstand. The celebration lasts for three days.

=== East Asia ===
==== China mainland ====
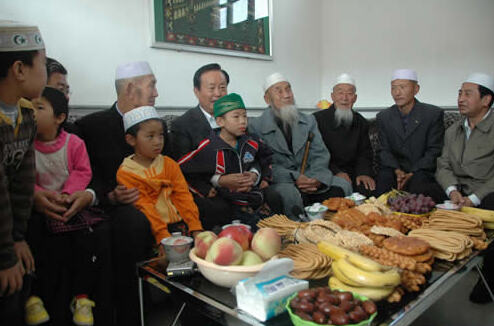
An ethnic Hui family celebrating Eid al-Fitr in Ningxia

In mainland China, out of 56 officially recognized ethnic groups, Eid al-Fitr is celebrated by at least 10 ethnic groups that are predominantly Muslim, and the Eid is known in China as Kāizhāi jié (Chinese: 开斋节). These groups are said to total 18 million according to official statistics, but some observers say the actual number may be much higher. It is also a public holiday in China in certain regions, including two Province Prefecture Level regions, Ningxia and Xinjiang. All residents in these areas, regardless of religion, are entitled to either a one-day or three-day official holiday. Outside the Muslim-majority regions, only Muslims are entitled to a one-day holiday. In Xinjiang province, Eid al-Fitr is even celebrated by the Han Chinese population. During the holiday, supplies of mutton, lamb and beef are distributed to households as part of a welfare program funded by government agencies, public and private institutions, and businesses. In Yunnan, Muslim populations are spread throughout the region. On Eid al-Fitr, however, some devotees may travel to Sayyid 'Ajjal's grave after their communal prayers. There, they will conduct readings from the Quran and clean the tomb, reminiscent of the historic annual Chinese Qingming festival, in which people go to their ancestors' graves, sweep and clean the area, and make food offerings. Finally the accomplishments of the Sayyid 'Ajall will be related in story form, concluded by a special prayer service to honour the hundreds of thousands of Muslims killed during the Panthay Rebellion, and the hundreds killed during the Shadian incident.

==== Taiwan ====
The Eid al-Fitr prayer and celebration in Taiwan draws much attention from local media. Special features of the event are regularly carried out in the newspapers and aired on televisions. These phenomena gives a boost to the Islamic activities in Taiwan. Muslims, mostly Indonesian blue collar men and women, typically gather at Taipei Main Station to perform the prayer.

=== Europe ===
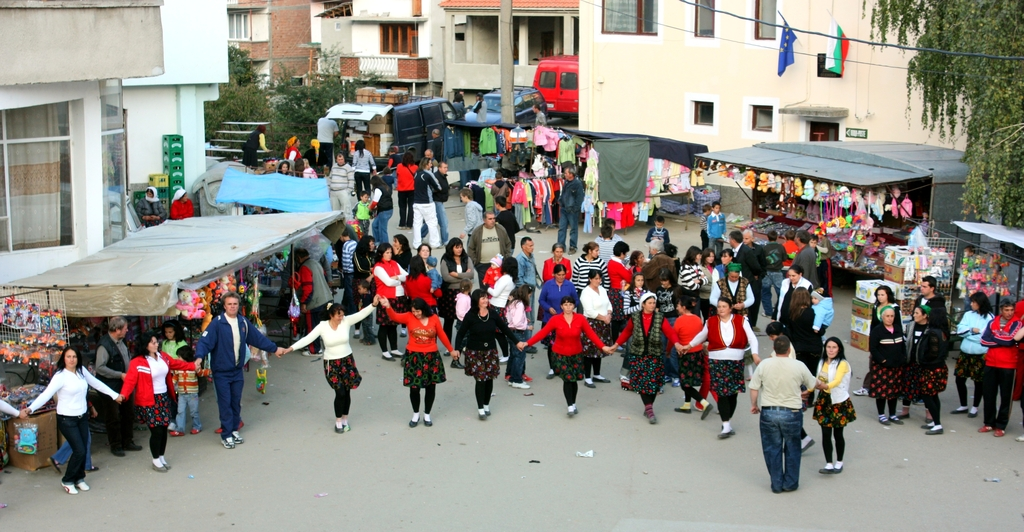
Pomaks dancing during Ramazan Bayram in a village centre in Bulgaria

==== Albania and Kosovo ====
Albanian Muslims generally celebrate the day as with most other countries. The day is known as Fitër Bajrami or Bajrami i Madh in Albania. Worshipers attend a dawn prayer and a sermon, after which people visit each other, plan gatherings and give gifts to children. Magiritsa (Greek Easter soup) and baklava are popularly consumed.

==== Bosnia and Herzegovina ====
In Bosnia and Herzegovina, Eid al-Fitr is locally known as Ramazanski bajram. It is a three-day public holiday. Like Albanians, worshipers attend a dawn prayer and a sermon, after which people visit each other, give gifts to children, and popularly consume baklava.

==== Germany ====
In Germany, Eid al-Fitr is most commonly known as Zuckerfest ("Sugar Festival", a calque of the Turkish Şeker Bayramı). It is not a public holiday, but most states allow children to take the day off school and some businesses close for the day or allow Muslim employees to take the holiday. Due to the history of Turkish immigration to Germany, Turkish traditions and terminology dominate in German Eid al-Fitr celebrations.

==== Greece and Cyprus ====
Eid al-Fitr (i.e. Seker Bayram, Sugar Feast) (Greek: Σεκέρ Μπαϊράμ or Ιντ αλ-φιτρ) is celebrated in Greece mainly in the Western Thrace region from the local Muslim minority (Turks, Pomaks and Roma), along with the other two major celebrations, Kurban Bayram (Sacrifice Feast) (Greek: Κουρμπάν Μπαϊράμ or Ιντ αλ-αντχά) and Hıdırellez; it is also celebrated by the Turks of Northern Cyprus. On the day of the Bayram, family gathers together, wear their best clothes, and celebrate with a common meal, after attending the morning prayer. The women prepare and offer sweets to family and visitors, while small children go around and pay their respects to the elderly by kissing their hands. The elder in turn reward them with candies, sweets, and small amounts of money. Local Muslim shopkeepers close their shops this day, while Muslim minority schools have a 5-day holiday for the feast.

==== Lithuania, Belarus and Poland ====
Lithuania, Belarus and Poland are homes to an indigenous Muslim people, the Lipka Tatars, though Lithuania and Poland have seen newer Muslims arriving, mainly the Chechens, Volga Tatars and Crimean Tatars, as well as Muslims from various Asian and African states, altogether making up just 0,1%. In both countries, Eid al-Fitr is referred as "Ramadan Bajram" and celebrated by these Muslims of both states.

==== Russia ====
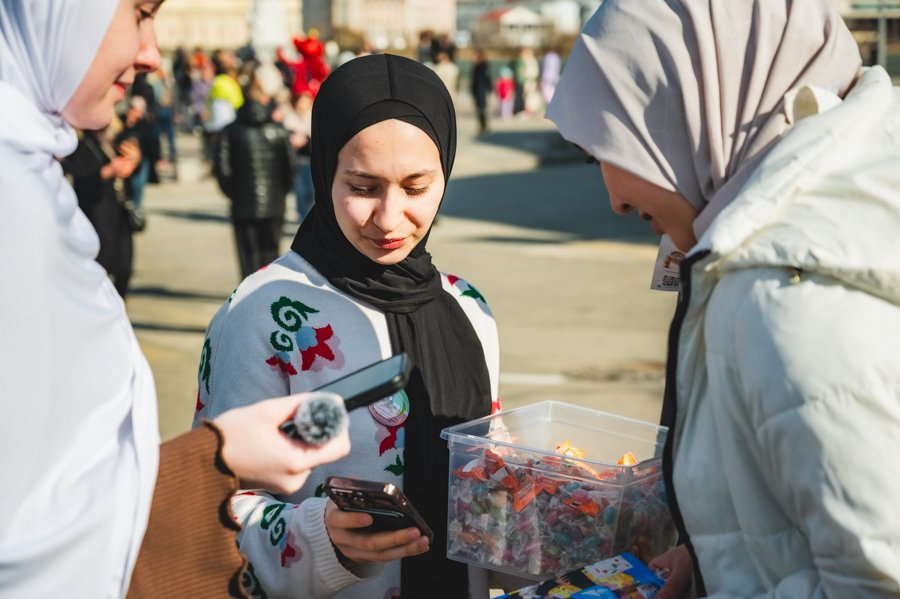
Uraza Bayram celebration in Kazan, Tatarstan, Russia (2025).

In Russia where 14 million Muslims reside as of 2017, Eid al-Fitr is often known as Uraza Bayram (Russian: Ураза-байрам) and is a public holiday in the republics of Adygea, Bashkortostan, Dagestan, Ingushetia, Kabardino-Balkaria, Karachay-Cherkessia, Tatarstan and Chechnya. Most festive dishes consist of mutton, but salads and various soups are also popular. As the Muslim population is diverse, traditional festive dishes differ between regions – for example in Tatarstan pancakes are popularly baked.

Russian Muslims go to festive worships at mosques in the morning of Eid al-Fitr, after which they often visit older relatives as a sign of respect. In the North Caucasian republics, children popularly go past various houses with a bag to get it filled with candy, specially stored by locals for the celebration. In Dagestan, eggs with bright stickers is a popular traditional dish served there during Eid al-Fitr. People generally dress more during this day – women choose bright dresses with beads while older people would wear papakhas. In many places in the country master classes are also hosted where families take part in activities such as embroidery and clay making.

==== Spain ====
In Spain, Eid al-Fitr (officially in Spanish: 'Fiesta del Eid Fitr') is officially recognised in Spanish law (Resolución de 17 de octubre de 2025: BOE-A-2025-21667) and celebrated in the autonomous city of Melilla (Spanish: Ciudad de Melilla) on the North African coast along with Eid al-Adha (officially named in la Ciudad de Melilla as 'Fiesta Sacrificio-Aid al Adha'). Meanwhile, also on the North African coast, the autonomous city of Ceuta (Spanish: Ciudad de Ceuta) celebrates only the latter, Eid al-Adha (officially named in la Ciudad de Ceuta as 'Fiesta Sacrificio-Eidul Adha') as a public holiday. Its second public holiday is instead dedicated to its patron saint, 'Our Lady of Africa' (officially in Spanish: 'Nuestra Señora de África').

==== Ukraine ====
In Ukraine, Eid al-Fitr (Ukrainian: Рамазан-байрам) as well as Eid al-Adha have been official state holidays since 2020. During the festival, Ukrainian Muslims (most of whom are Crimean Tatars) often gather with loved ones.

==== United Kingdom ====
Although Eid al-Fitr is not a recognized public holiday in the United Kingdom, many schools, businesses, and organisations allow for at least a day's leave to be taken for religious celebrations.

In the United Kingdom, individuals take part in prayers and play games for Eid al-Fitr. Blackburn Rovers F.C. had an Eid prayer on their pitch in 2022.

=== Americas ===
==== United States ====
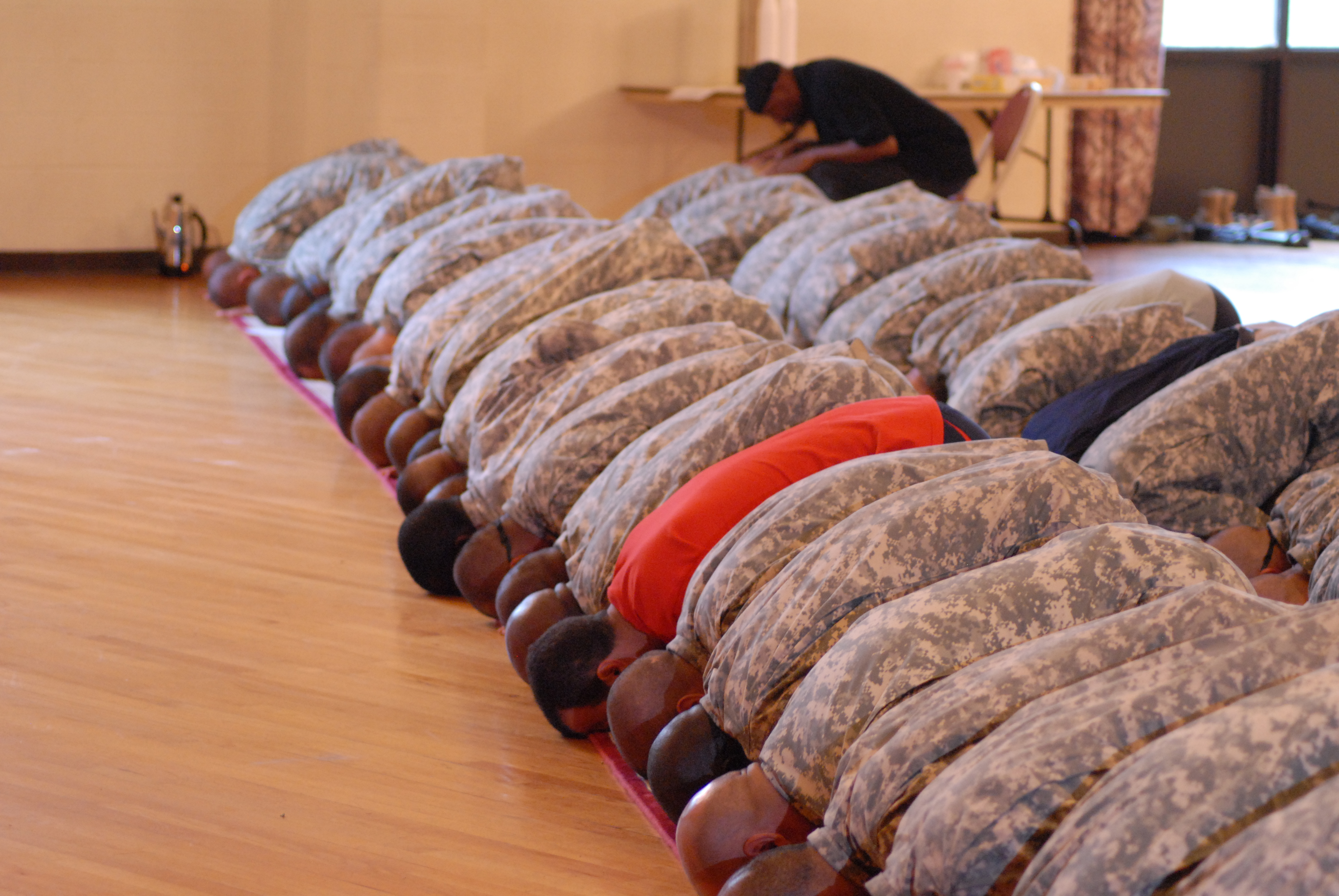
Muslim U.S. soldiers performing the Eid prayer

In New York City, alternate side parking (street cleaning) regulations are suspended on Eid. Beginning in 2016, New York City public schools also remain closed on Eid. Other school districts close on Eid, including Irvington New Jersey's school district and Vermont's Burlington School District.

The United States Postal Service (USPS) has issued several Eid postage stamps, across several years—starting in 2001—honoring "two of the most important festivals in the Islamic calendar: Eid al-Fitr and Eid al-Adha." Eid stamps were released in 2001–2002, 2006–2009, 2011, and 2013. They are also being issued as Forever Stamps. All Eid stamps to date show the work of Mohamed Zakariya.

Mosques in North America offer Eid prayer. For Eid during the COVID-19 pandemic in the United States, some mosques required temperature checks and for participants to socially distance. Other mosques gathered at public parks to celebrate. By 2021, some Muslims were returning to mosques to pray for the holiday.

==== Trinidad and Tobago ====
The Muslim population of Trinidad and Tobago popularly eat sawine/vermicelli, a sweet dessert, to mark the celebration, but the feast also consists of curries, rotis, and chicken and curry goat. Eid al-Fitr is a public holiday in Trinidad and Tobago, having been declared in 1962.

==== Suriname, Guyana ====
Eid al-Fitr is a public holiday in Suriname and Guyana.

==== Argentina ====
In Argentina, Eid (Spanish: Fiesta del Fin del Ayuno) is officially a non-working holiday for Muslims.

=== Oceania ===
==== Australia and New Zealand ====
Australian and New Zealand Muslims celebrate Eid al-Fitr in a variety of ways depending on their specific cultural background. Many local celebrations take place in community centers and mosques.

== In the Gregorian calendar ==
Conversion of Hijri years 1343 to 1500 to the Gregorian calendar, with first days of al-Muharram (brown), Ramadan (grey) and Shawwal (black) bolded, and Eid al-Adha dotted – in the SVG file, hover over a spot to show its dates and a line to show the month

Although the date of Eid al-Fitr is always the same in the Islamic calendar, the date in the Gregorian calendar falls approximately 11 days earlier each successive year, since the Islamic calendar is lunar and the Gregorian calendar is solar. Hence if the Eid falls in the first ten days of a Gregorian calendar year, there will be a second Eid in the last ten days of the same Gregorian calendar year, as happened in 2000 CE. The Gregorian date may vary between countries depending on the local visibility of the new moon. Some expatriate Muslim communities follow the dates as determined for the nearest Islamic country to their country of residence, while others follow the local dates of their home country.

The following table shows predicted dates and announced dates based on new moon sightings for Saudi Arabia.

Recent dates of Eid al-Fitr in Saudi Arabia
Islamic year	Umm al-Qura predicted	High Judiciary Council of Saudi Arabia announced
1420	8 January 2000	8 January 2000
1421	27 December 2000	27 December 2000
1422	16 December 2001	16 December 2001
1423	5 December 2002	5 December 2002
1424	25 November 2003	25 November 2003
1425	14 November 2004	13 November 2004
1426	3 November 2005	3 November 2005
1427	23 October 2006	23 October 2006
1428	13 October 2007	12 October 2007
1429	1 October 2008	30 September 2008
1430	20 September 2009	20 September 2009
1431	10 September 2010	10 September 2010
1432	30 August 2011	30 August 2011
1433	19 August 2012	19 August 2012
1434	8 August 2013	8 August 2013
1435	28 July 2014	28 July 2014
1436	17 July 2015	17 July 2015
1437	6 July 2016	6 July 2016
1438	25 June 2017	25 June 2017
1439	15 June 2018	15 June 2018
1440	4 June 2019	4 June 2019
1441	24 May 2020	24 May 2020
1442	13 May 2021	13 May 2021
1443	2 May 2022	2 May 2022
1444	21 April 2023	21 April 2023
1445	10 April 2024	10 April 2024
1446	30 March 2025	30 March 2025
1447	20 March 2026	20 March 2026
1448	9 March 2027	
1449	26 February 2028	
1450	14 February 2029	
1451	3 February 2030	

Because the Hijri year differs by about 11 days from the AD year, Eid al-Fitr can occur twice a year. The next occurrence of this will be in 2033.

== Gallery ==
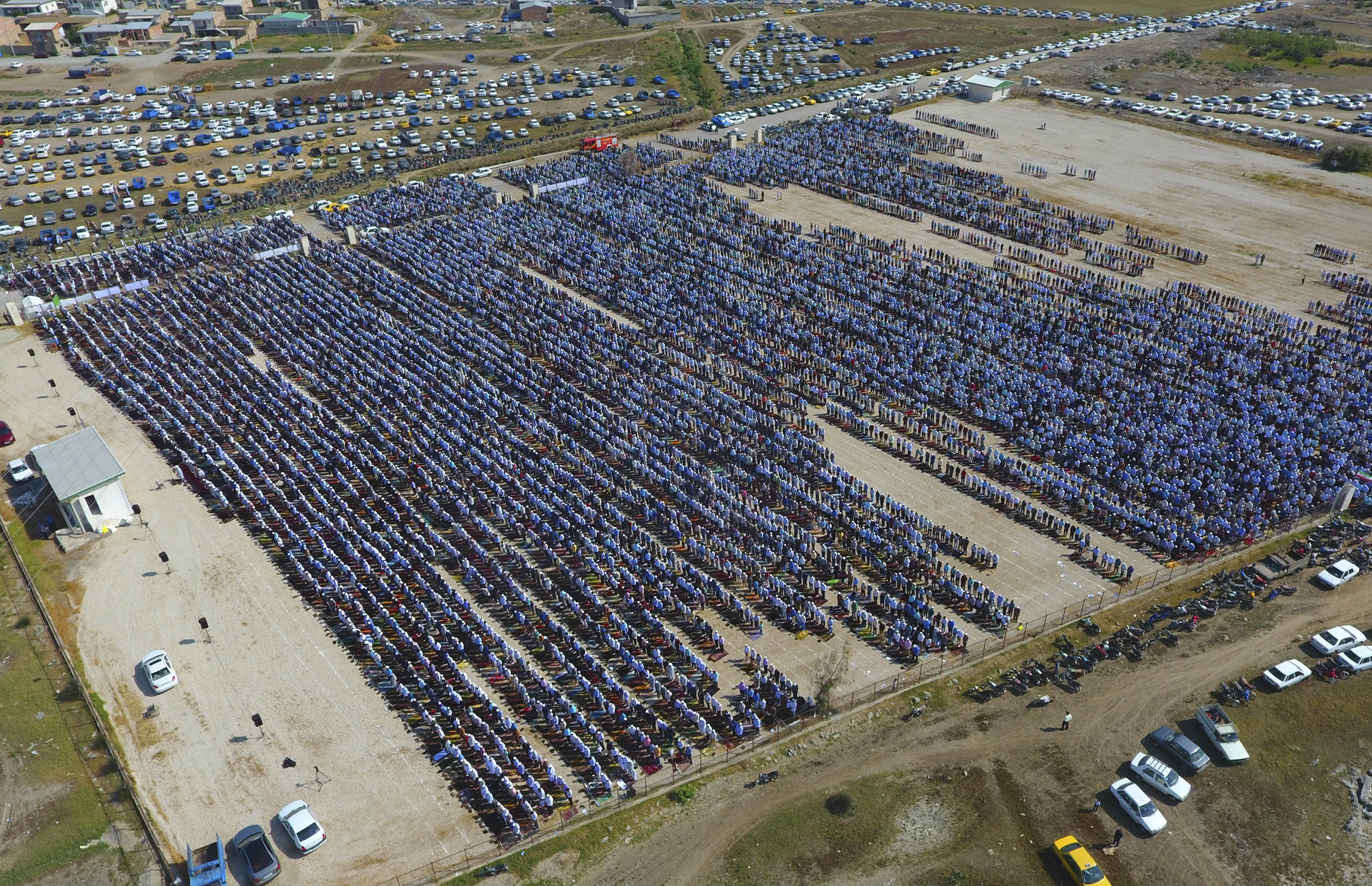
Eid al-Fitr prayer, Torkaman, Iran 2017

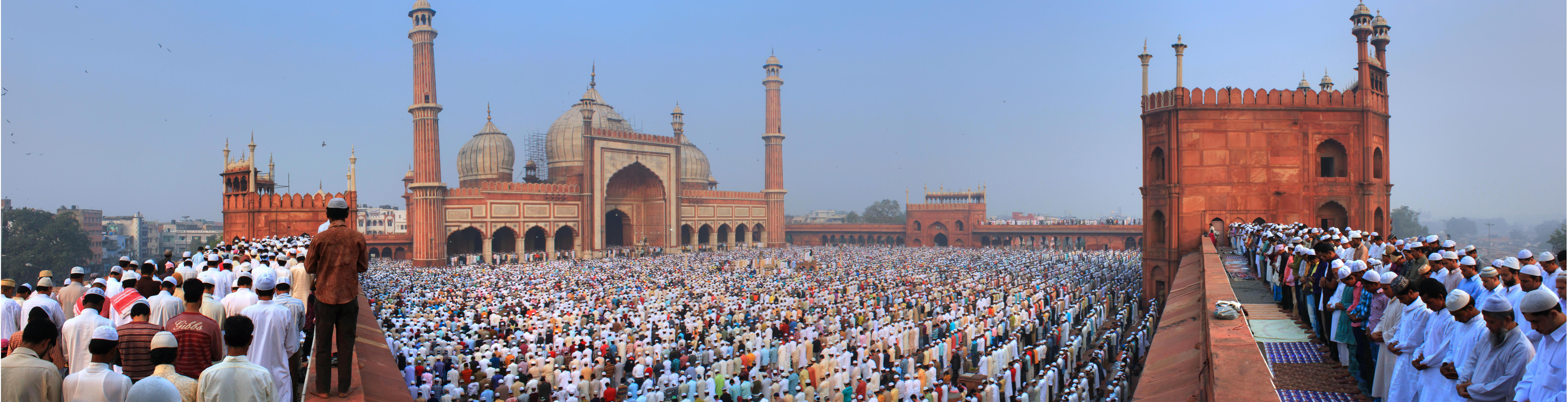
Eid al-Fitr mass prayer at Delhi's Jama Masjid, India

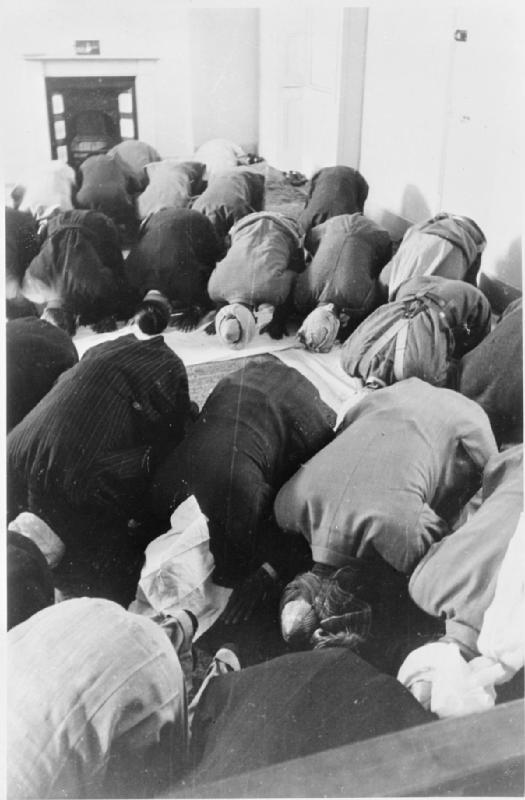
British Muslims in performing the Eid prayers at East London Mosque during the celebration, 1941

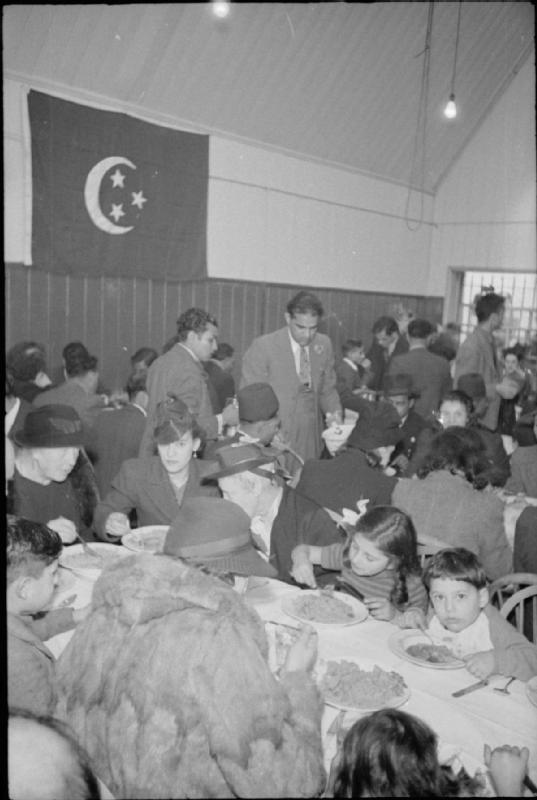
British Muslim soldiers and merchant seamen from India, Afghanistan, Iran, Iraq, Egypt, Sudan, Palestine, Transjordan, Syria, Arabia, Aden and Somaliland, performing the Eid prayers at the East London Mosque in 1941

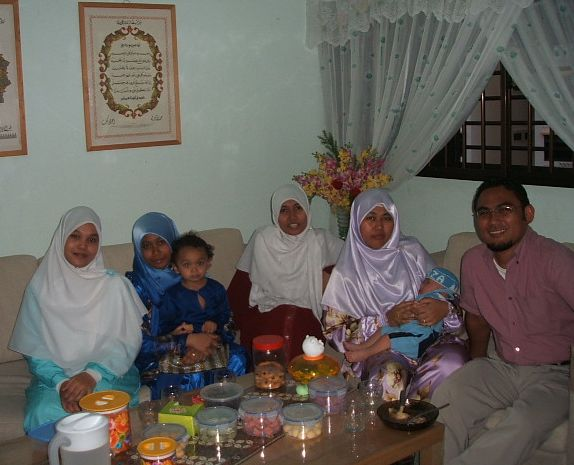
Muslims in Singapore celebrating Eid al-Fitr

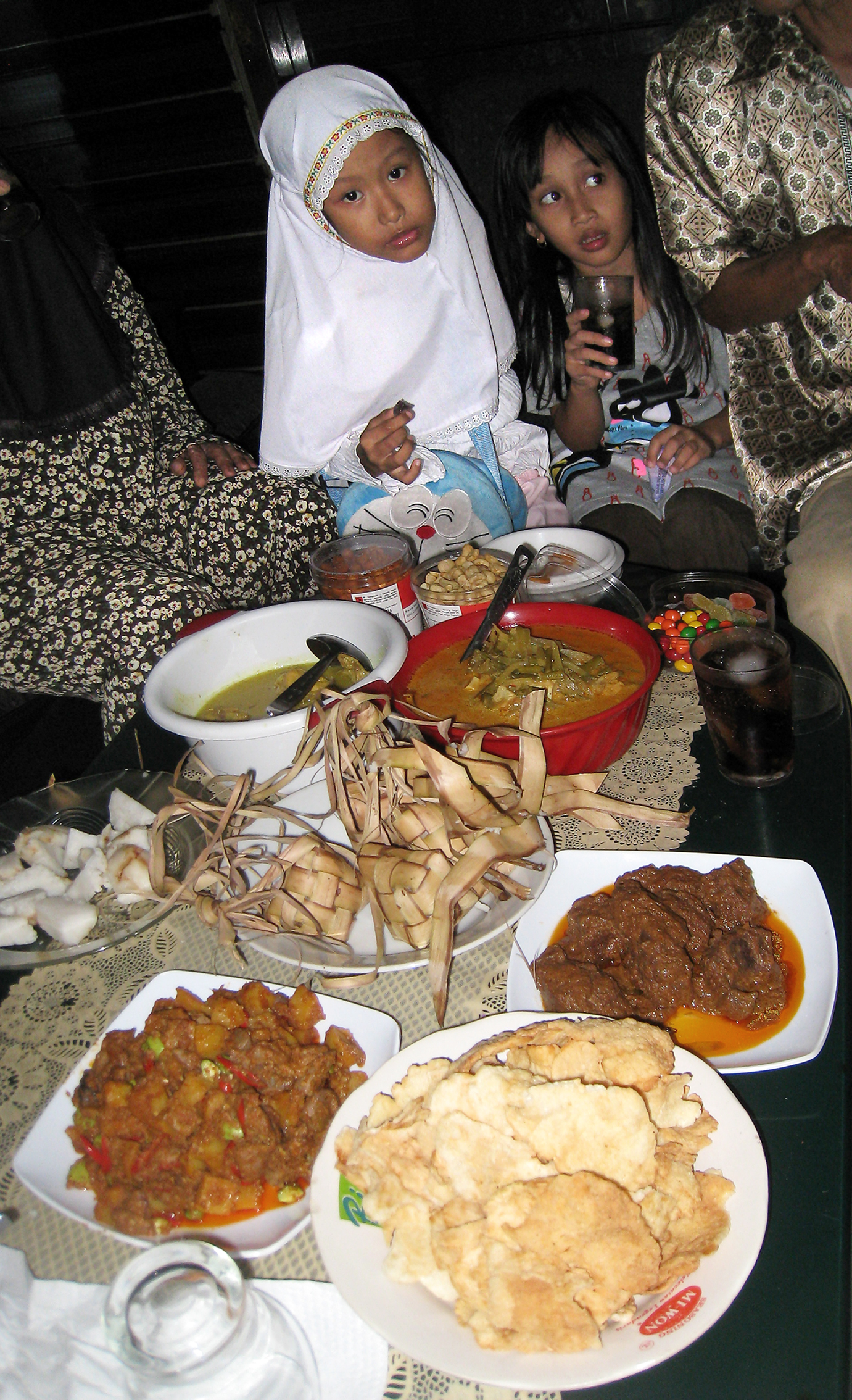
An Indonesian family celebrating lebaran with various culinary dishes specific to this holiday

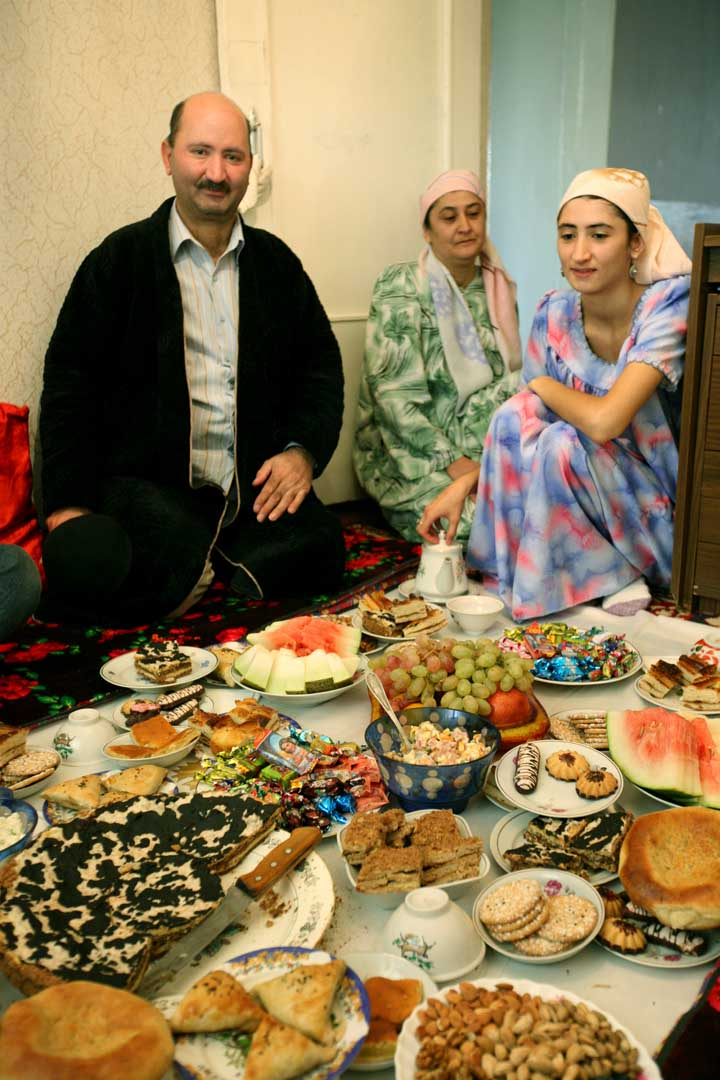
Family celebrating eid, Tajikistan

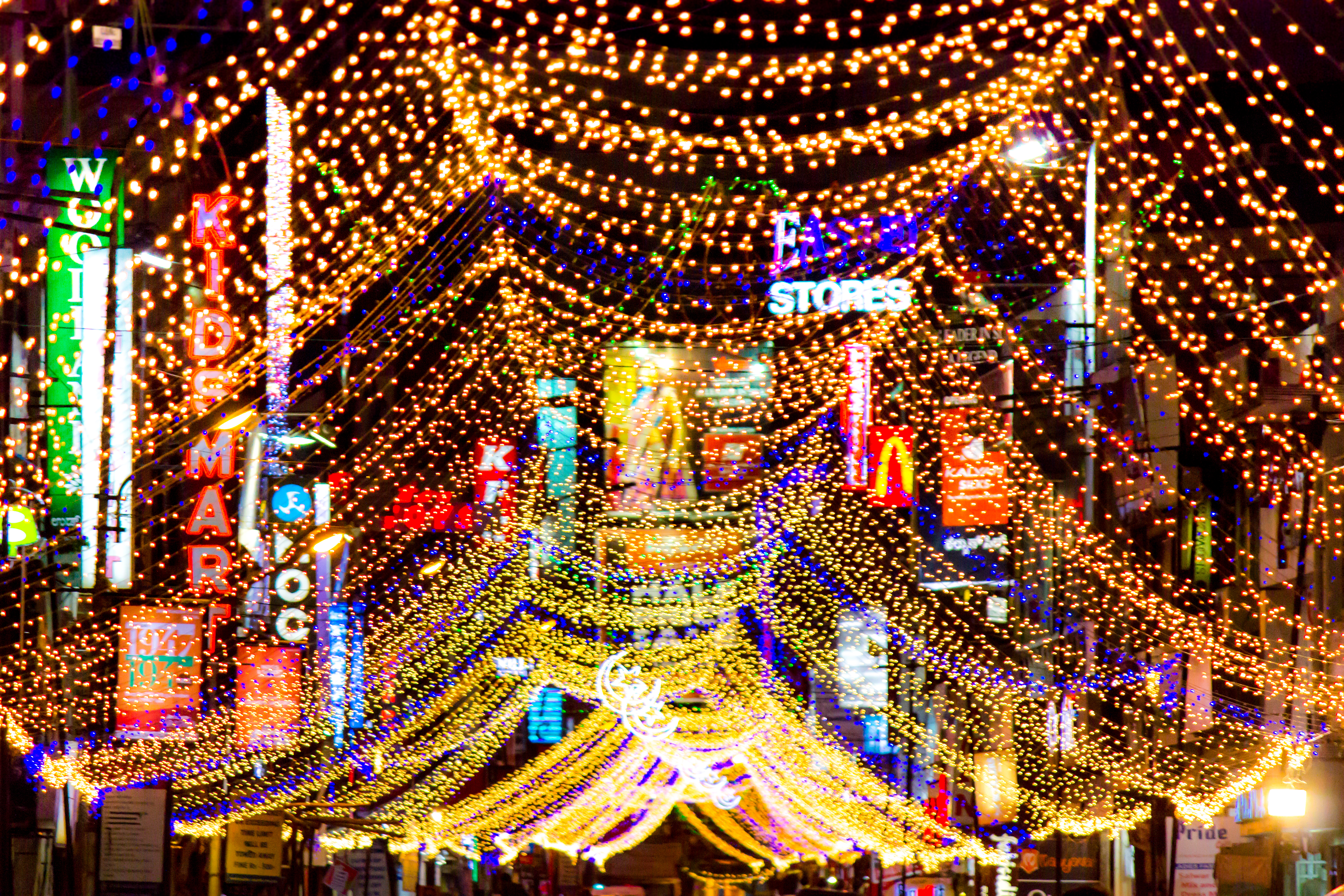
Lit up Commercial Street in Bangalore, India during Eid al-Fitr

Eid al-Fitr mass prayer in Istiqlal Mosque, Jakarta, Indonesia

== See also ==
- Eid al-Ghadir
- Shab-e-Barat
- Quds Day
- Glossary of Islam
- Outline of Islam
- Index of Islam-related articles
