= Eidiyah =

Gift given by elders in celebration of a holiday in the Islamic world

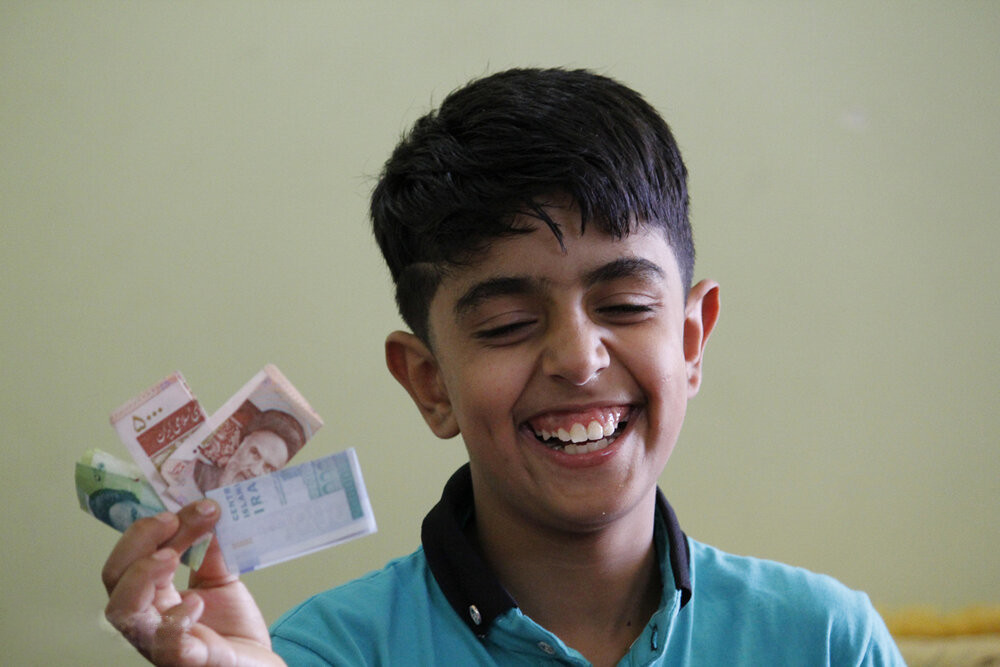
A boy in Iran shortly after receiving money as gift on Eid al-Fitr

An eidiyah (Note: /iːˈdiːə/ ee-DEE-ə.) (Arabic: عيدية, romanized: ʿīdiyya) or eidi (Note: /ˈiːdi/ EE-dee.) (Iranian Persian: عیدی, romanized: ʿeydi; Urdu: عیدی, romanized: ʿīdī), also called an Eid gift or a salami, is a traditional gift, usually in the form of money, given to children and family members by older relatives or family friends. It is commonly part of the celebration of the two Muslim holidays: Eid al-Fitr and Eid al-Adha. The practice, however, extends beyond Islamic contexts and is also associated with non-Islamic holidays such as Nowruz. This culture has spread throughout the Muslim community around the globe including the subcontinent and across Europe and America, and spreads joy and generosity, which aligns with Islamic values. It is neither obligatory (fard/wajib) nor a Sunnah act.

== Terminology ==
In different languages, the custom of giving holiday gifts during Islamic festivals is referred to by different terms:

- Azerbaijani: bayramlıq
- Kazakh: айттық aittyq
- Iranian Persian: عیدی eydi
- Turkish: bayramlık
- Urdu: عیدی īdī
- Uzbek: hayitlik

== Distribution practices ==
Adult giving money to children as a gift in Iran on Eid al-Fitr

In Islamic culture, children line up from youngest to oldest in front of the oldest family member and receive their gift. The gift value increases with the age of the child, with the last child in the line receiving the highest value gift. However, this lining-up of people is not necessarily followed in all cultures. Some people may give eidiyah even without making the recipients of eidiyah standing in a queue. The eidiyah may also be distributed equally, not necessarily in accordance with older or younger age of the recipient.

== Gifting ==
In Persian and other Islamic cultures, children are traditionally given money as eidi from parents and other adult family members. Though, the concept of eidi has evolved to include other gifts such as greeting cards, candy and toys.

Gifts prepared for Eid

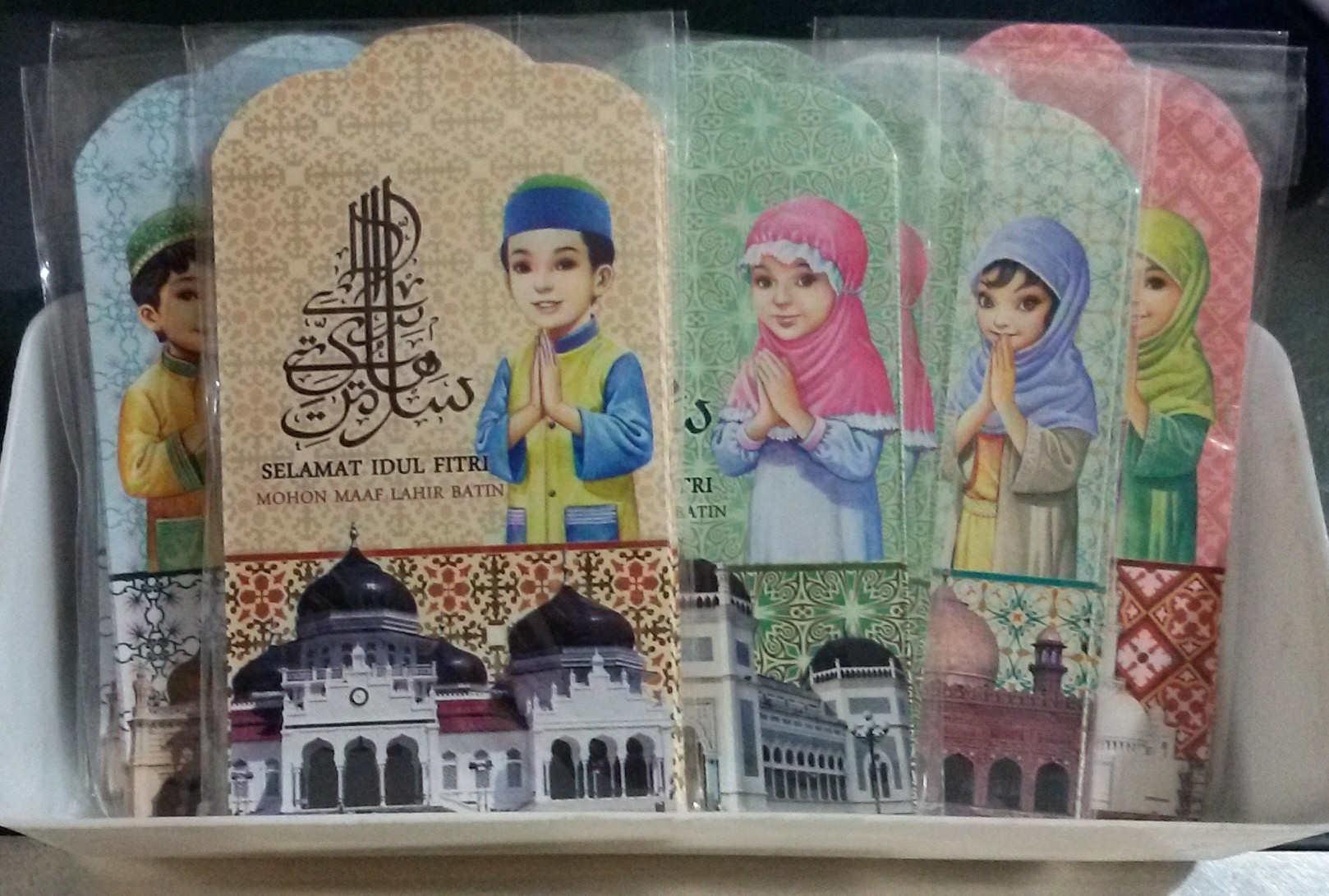
Eid greeting cards in a shop in Indonesia

== Image gallery ==

Afghan children take free school supplies during an Eid celebration

== See also ==
- Gift economy
- Red envelope
  - Green envelope, in the Malay world
