= Eid cuisine =

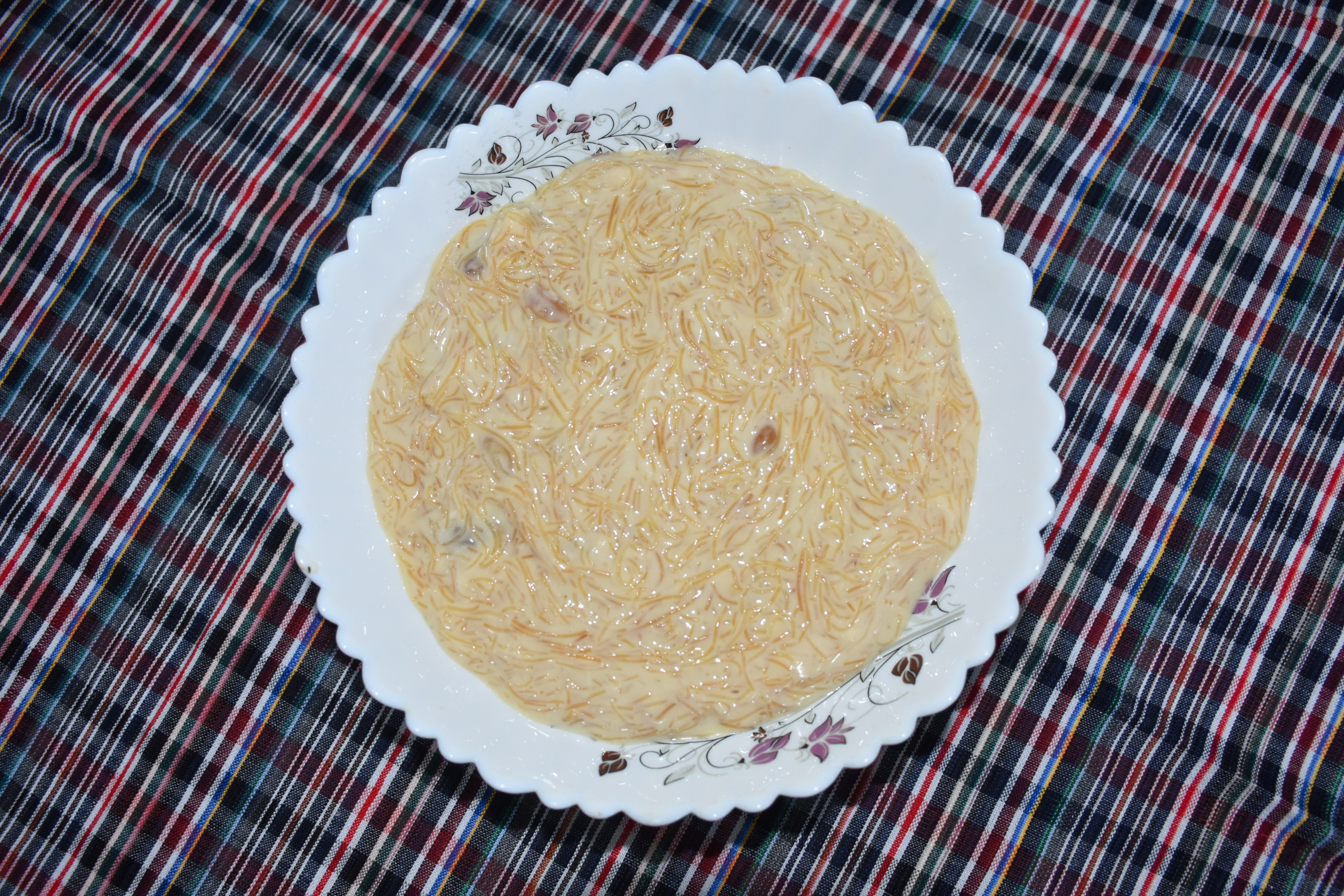
Shemai, a popular Bengali Eid dessert

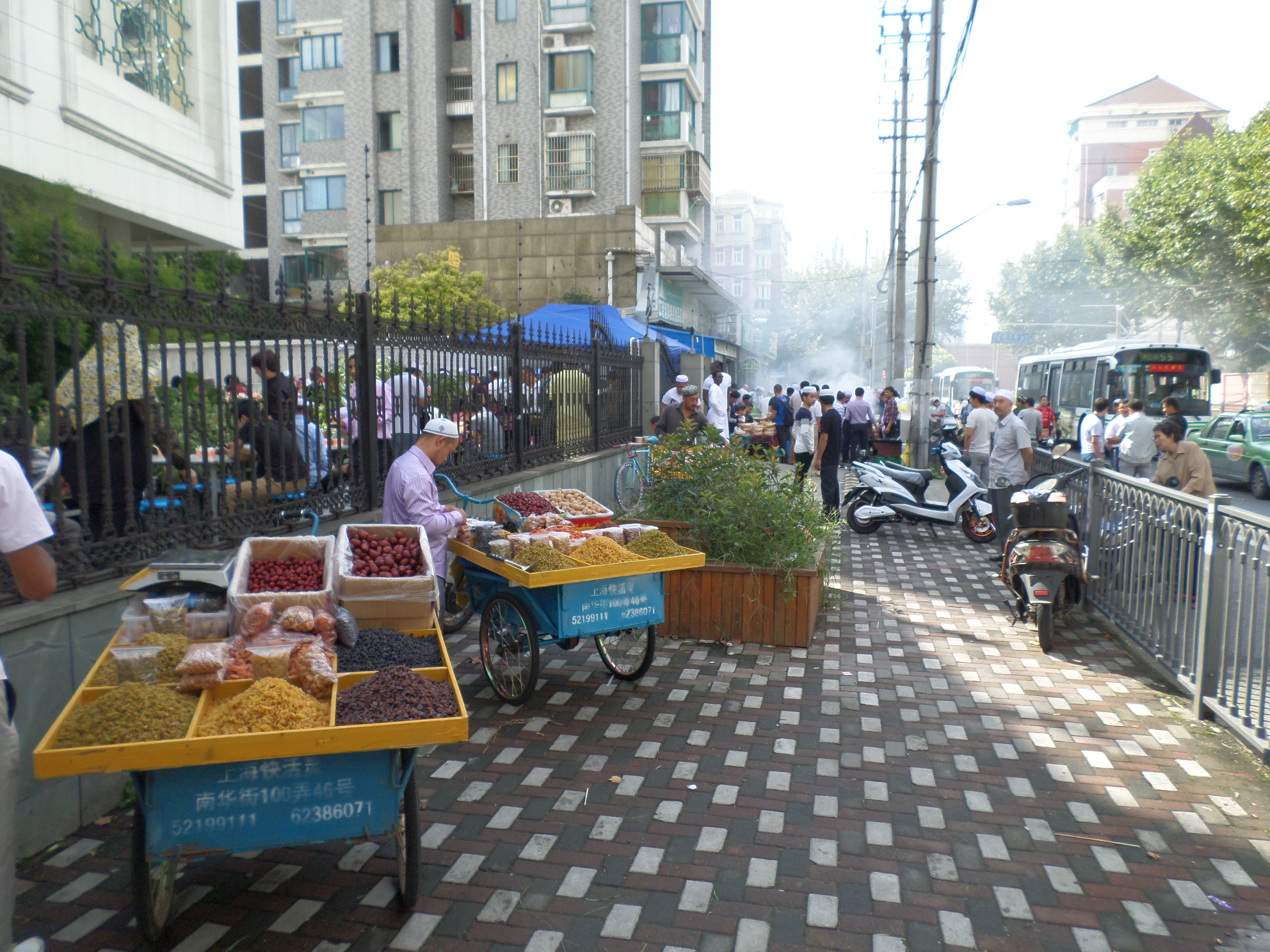
Eid cuisine sold outside Jiangwan Mosque in Shanghai, China during Eid al-Adha.

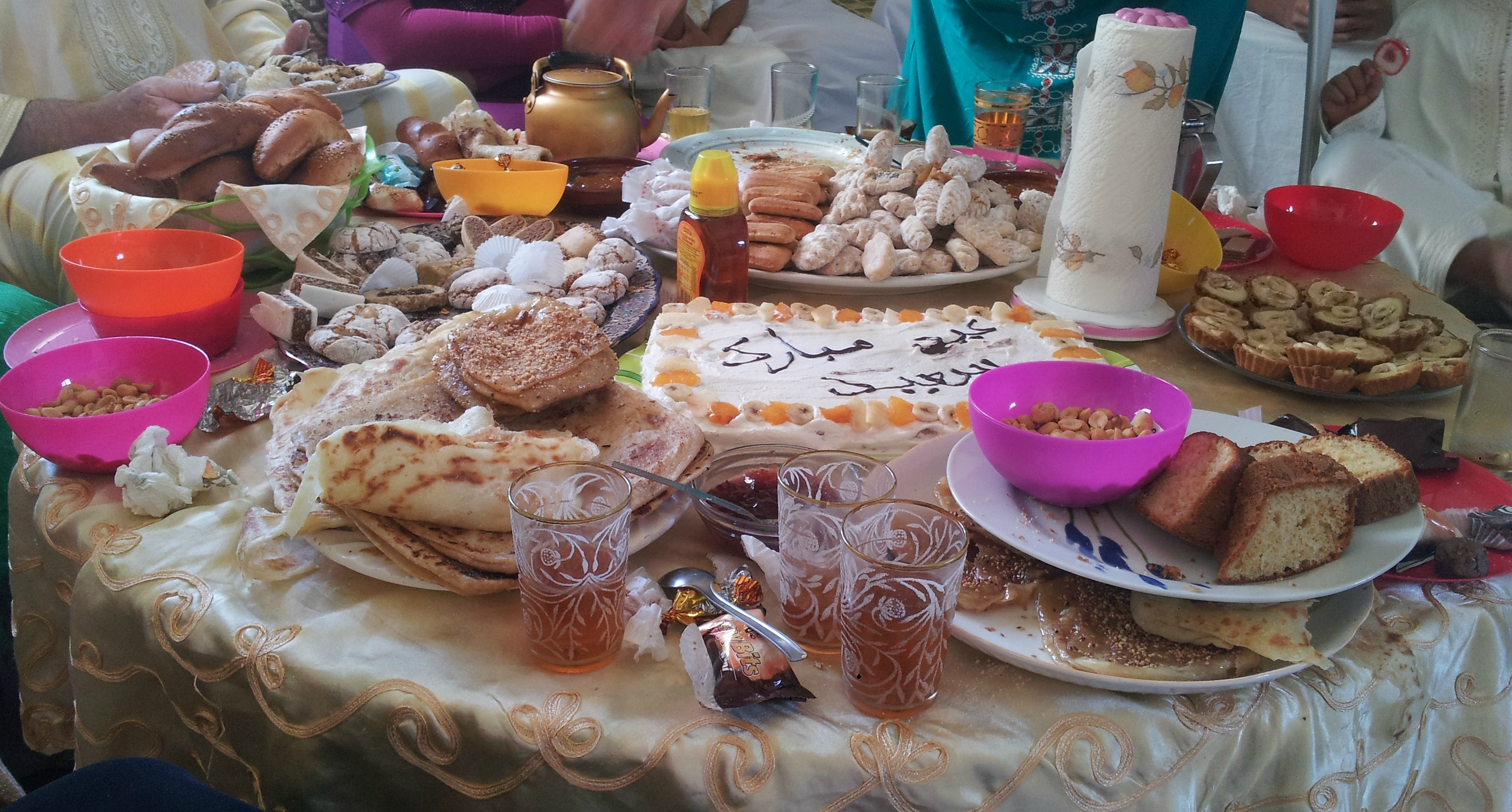
Moroccan Eid food

Both festivals of Eid celebrated in the Muslim world include cuisines specific to countries and localities.

== Eid-ul-Fitr cuisines ==
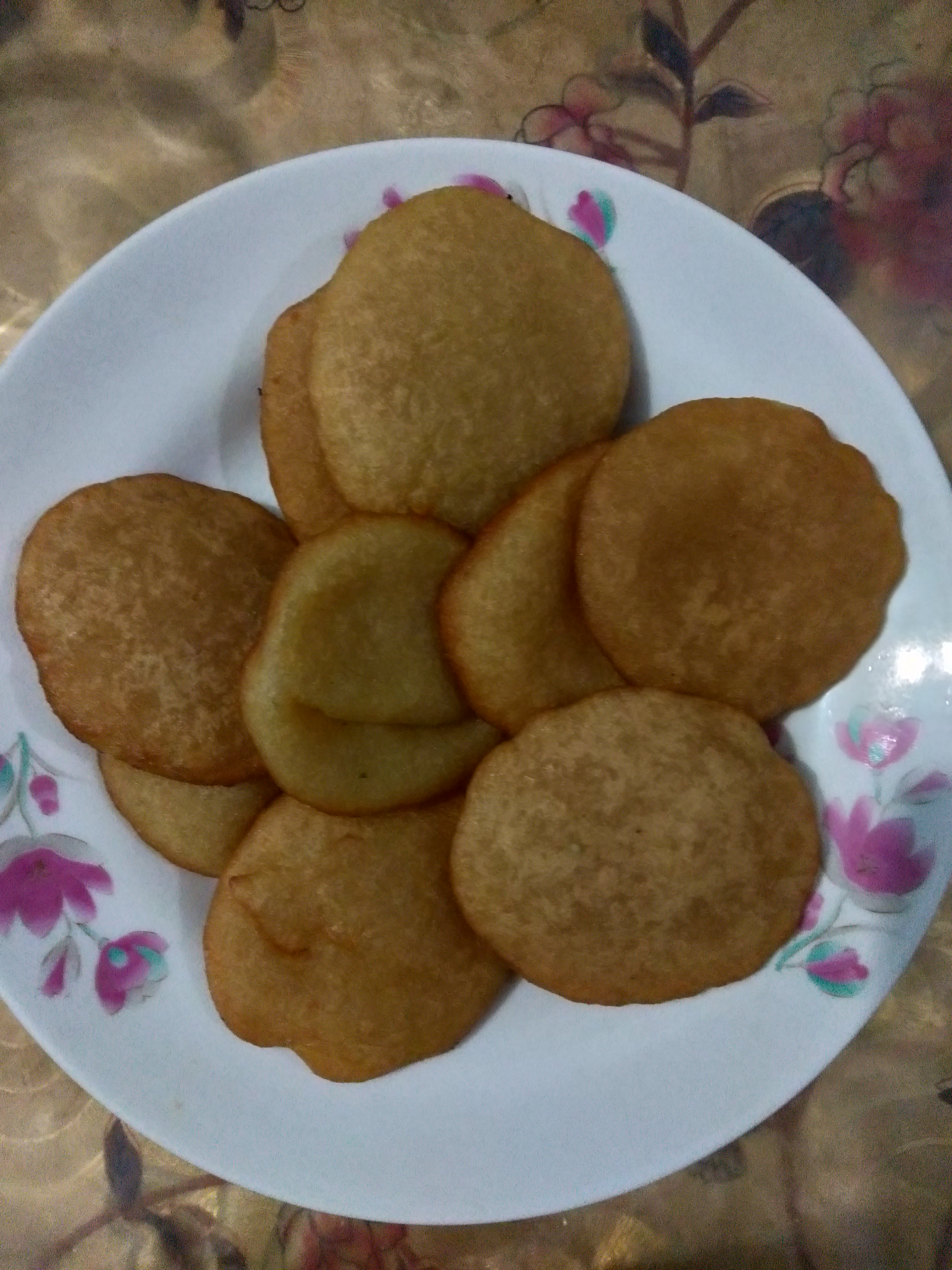
Handesh, a traditional Bengali Eid snack

Eid-ul-Fitr is also known as "Sweet Eid" because of the amount and variety of sweet dishes consumed on this occasion celebrating the happy end of Ramadan (which brings the mercy of Allah). Bangladesh, Brunei, Pakistan, Iran, Indonesia, India, Malaysia and the Arab world have traditional dishes to celebrate Eid. The breakfast of Eid-ul-Fitr are sweet dishes, including Boeber, a dish made by cooking vermicelli with dates. The vermicelli and dates, cooked separately in milk, are also consumed as breakfast before offering Eid prayer. Another variety includes balaleet, popular in the Persian Gulf region.

Depending on the locality, the types and forms of the cuisine vary but are always sweet dishes.

In the Middle East, a wide variety of desserts, bakery items, candy, treats, sweets and cookies are made or bought for consumption during Eid. Those include mammol, ghorabya or qurabiya, kahk, baklava, betitfour, barfi, cakes, cookies, kanafeh, halva and marzipan.

In South Asia, sheer kurma barfi, halwa, kheer, and Shahi tukda are most common dishes during Eid. Chomchoms, barfis, gulabjamuns and different types of pithas as well as roshmalai are popular. These are not only consumed inside houses but also presented to relatives and friends when visiting them on Eid-ul-Fitr. In Sri Lanka, watalapam, kevum, dodol, gulab jamun, jelebi, kokies and sheerkurma are popular treats.

Pulao, korma, kabab and curries are usually prepared for lunch and dinner. Biryani is also common.

Kanafe, baklava, lokum, tulumba, chocolate, chips, candies, cookies, cotton candy and Turkish coffee are served for Eid in Turkey.

Ketupat, lemang, dodol, kuih or kue, rendang, opor ayam, sayur lodeh, gulai and other treats are commonly served during Eid in Indonesia, Malaysia, Brunei, and Singapore.

Uyghur households prepare polo, sangza, sweets, and tea for Eid.

== Eid-ul-Adha cuisines ==
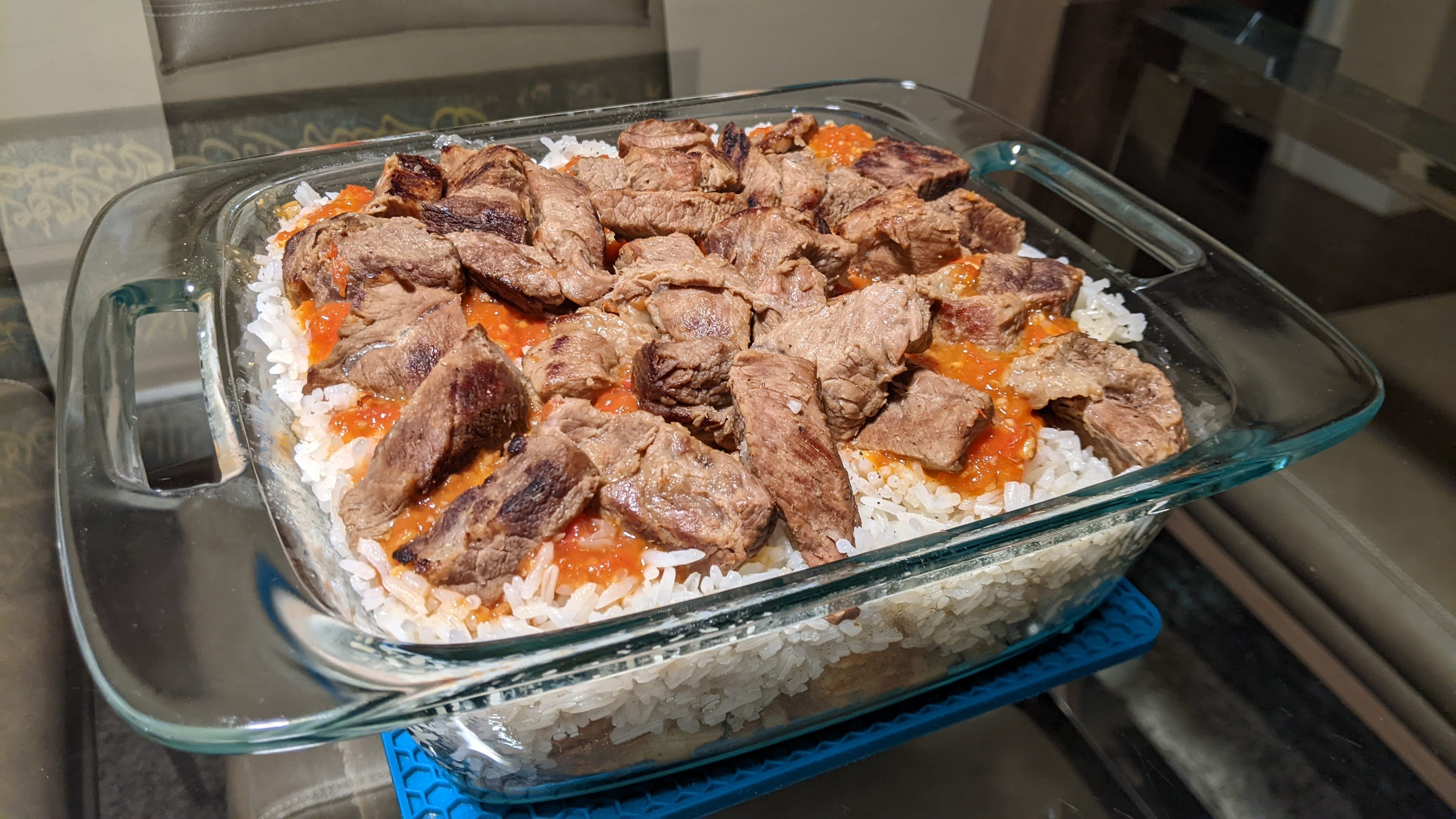
Egyptian Fattah, popular dish in Eid Al-Adha

Eid-ul-Adha is the "Salty Eid" because a larger variety of dishes than those served during Eid-ul-Fitr are savoury, including beef or mutton depending on the animal slaughtered in the house. The presents offered to friends, relatives, and the poor of the society include the meat of the slaughtered animal. The fried liver of the animal is used as breakfast, and different dishes include different varieties of kebabs (boneless meat that has been mashed and fried or roasted), nihari, haleem, korma, curries and other varieties. Rice dishes, including different forms of pulao and biryani, are also very popular in South Asia.

Kokoreç, which is made from intestines, may also be eaten in Turkey and other Balkan Muslim communities where it is very popular.

Fatteh is another popular dish during Eid Al-Adha in Egypt; it's made from lamb meat or beef, rice, toasted pita bread, and topped with garlic tomato sauce.

Uyghur households also prepare sangza for Eid Al-Adha.

== See also ==
- Halal
