= Qatari cuisine =

Culinary traditions of Qatar

Qatari cuisine is made up of traditional Arab cuisine. Machbūs, a meal consisting of rice, meat, and vegetables, is the national dish in Qatar, typically made with either lamb or chicken and slow-cooked to give it a depth of flavour. Seafood and dates are staple food items in the country. Many of these dishes are also used in other countries in the region, as they share many commonalities. In other parts of the region, some of the dishes have different names or use slightly different ingredients.

== Culinary traditions ==
Being invited to dine in a Qatari home is considered a special honor, reflecting the cultural value placed on hospitality. One notable aspect of Arab society is the generosity of the host, who typically prepares food in quantities much larger than necessary, ensuring that guests are abundantly provided for. To run out of food would be seen as a significant failure on the part of the host. Traditional meals are usually served with guests seated on the floor, communally partaking of the food with their hands.

Before the meal commences, it is customary to serve coffee or tea, with the most common being Arabic coffee, brewed in brass coffee pots infused with cardamom. Served in small porcelain cups, guests often consume three to five cups, signaling their satisfaction by gently shaking the cup when they have had their fill. Hot tea, typically flavored with mint and sweetened with sugar, may also be served in small glass mugs. Coffee and tea are commonly offered in both social and business meetings.

Restaurants traditionally serving Qatari and Arabic food are called matbakhs (kitchen). Such restaurants can be found almost all over Qatar, with notable concentrations being in Souq Waqif, The Pearl-Qatar and the Doha Corniche area.

=== Dates and date syrup ===
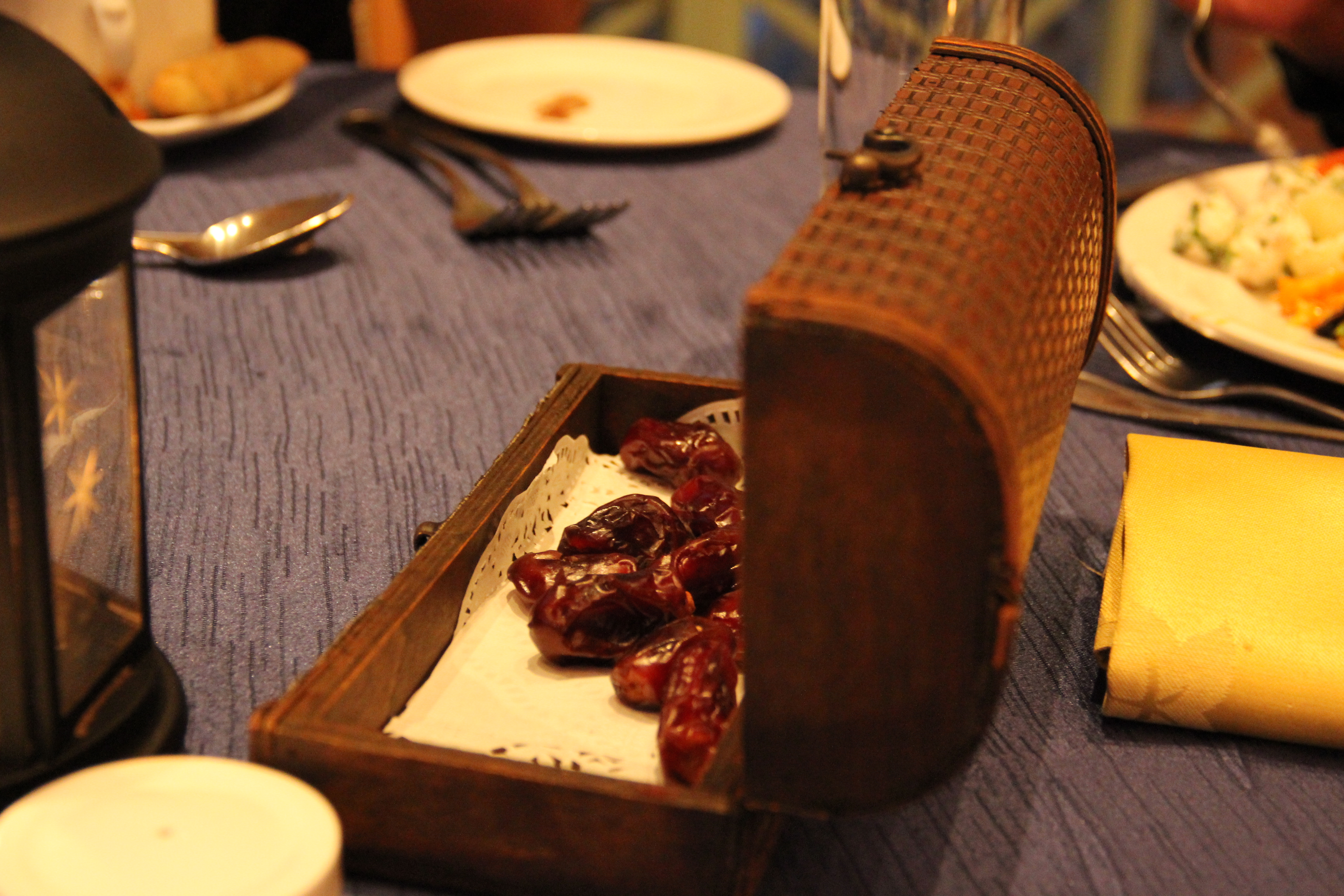
Boxed dates

Dates (kholas) hold significant cultural and culinary importance as the national fruit of Qatar. Dates are widely cultivated in Qatar, with production exceeding 30,000 tonnes annually as of 2022, resulting in an 88% self-sufficiency in dates. This cultivation tradition dates back thousands of years in the region, and the Qatari national emblem features two date palms, alongside a traditional dhow. Dates also play an important role in Islamic tradition, particularly during Ramadan.

They are celebrated annually during the local dates festival. The annual Local Dates Festival held in Souq Waqif provides a platform for local farmers to showcase their harvests and date-based products, contributing to the promotion of local agriculture. They are commonly offered as a symbol of hospitality in traditional Qatari gatherings, alongside Arabic coffee. Several varieties of dates exist, among which the most popular in Qatar are khalas and shaishi.

The manufacturing of date syrup is one of the oldest industries in Qatar, dating back to at least the 17th century. The syrup was obtained by using a traditional date press called madabis or madbasa. Due to its high-calorie content and nutrient density, it was a cheap and quick source of energy for the locals, particularly pearl divers. With a short harvesting season for dates, the production of date syrup allowed for their preservation and prolonged consumption. This syrup served both civil and commercial purposes, being traded as a commodity and providing sustenance during periods of tribal conflicts and unrest. While modernization and lifestyle changes initially led to a decline in date syrup consumption, recent trends toward health-conscious alternatives have sparked renewed interest in this traditional sweetener.

=== Ramadan culinary traditions ===
Preceding the commencement of fasting during Ramadan, Qataris engage in preparatory rituals and communal gatherings, exemplified by the observance of Sha'ban, the month prior to Ramadan, with Al-Nafla festivities. During Al-Nafla, families share traditional meals such as harees and tharid—a meal combining crumbled bread, meat, and broth— with neighbors and the less fortunate.

Al Ghabqa is a feast that takes place at night during Ramadan following iftar and tarawih prayers, traditionally shared between immediate family members. The feast features a variety of dishes, notably grilled and fried fish, rice cooked with date extract, and tharid. The feast also includes an assortment of sweets such as luqaimat and asida, alongside dates, tea, and Arabic coffee.

Since the 20th century, street food, particularly street kebabs, has been especially popular during Ramadan.

== Ingredients ==
Qatari cuisine predominantly revolves around staples like meat, fish, and rice infused with spices including cumin, coriander, cinnamon, and saffron. The incorporation of fresh ingredients such as herbs, vegetables, and fruits, whether locally sourced from regional markets or imported, is ubiquitous. Qataris often enhance popular traditional dishes by adding bread loaves or additional spices.

Ingredients for traditional dishes can be purchased in local souqs (markets) such as Souq Waqif, which includes a spice souq.

=== Qatari spice blends ===
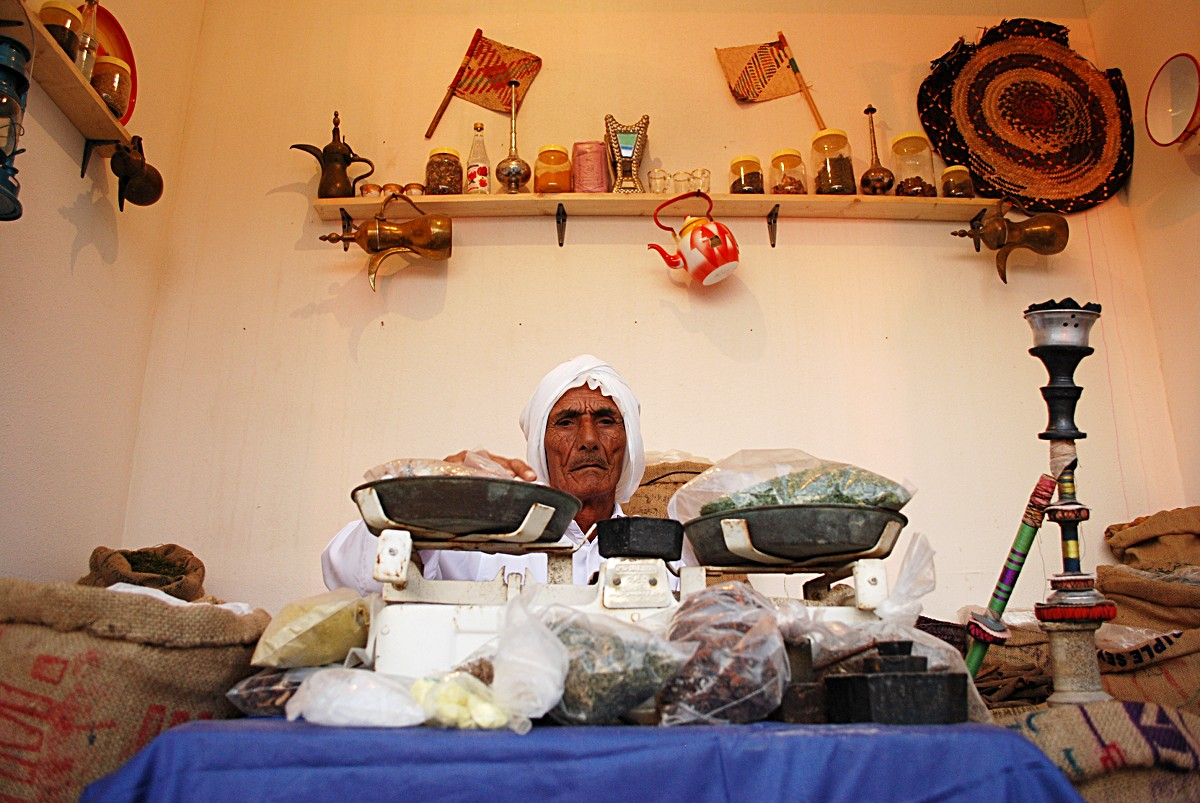
Traditional spices at Souq Waqif

Spices play an important role in many dishes in Arabic cooking. Cooks make sure to purchase the best-quality spices and avoid overbuying to preserve their freshness.

==== Bizar ====
Bizar is a combination of black pepper, coriander seeds, cinnamon sticks, clove, dried ginger, whole cardamom, dried red chili, and turmeric sticks. The spices are first washed, and then sun-dried, after which they are ground and mixed.

==== Daqoos blend ====
This is a red chili blend that includes roasted and crushed wheat, roasted and crushed cumin seeds, roasted and crushed sesame seeds, coriander seeds, crushed and dry red chili, garlic cloves, and finally salt.

==== Hisso ====
This blend of spices includes dried ginger, cinnamon sticks, cardamom seeds, whole black pepper, turmeric sticks, and cumin seeds.

== Main dishes ==
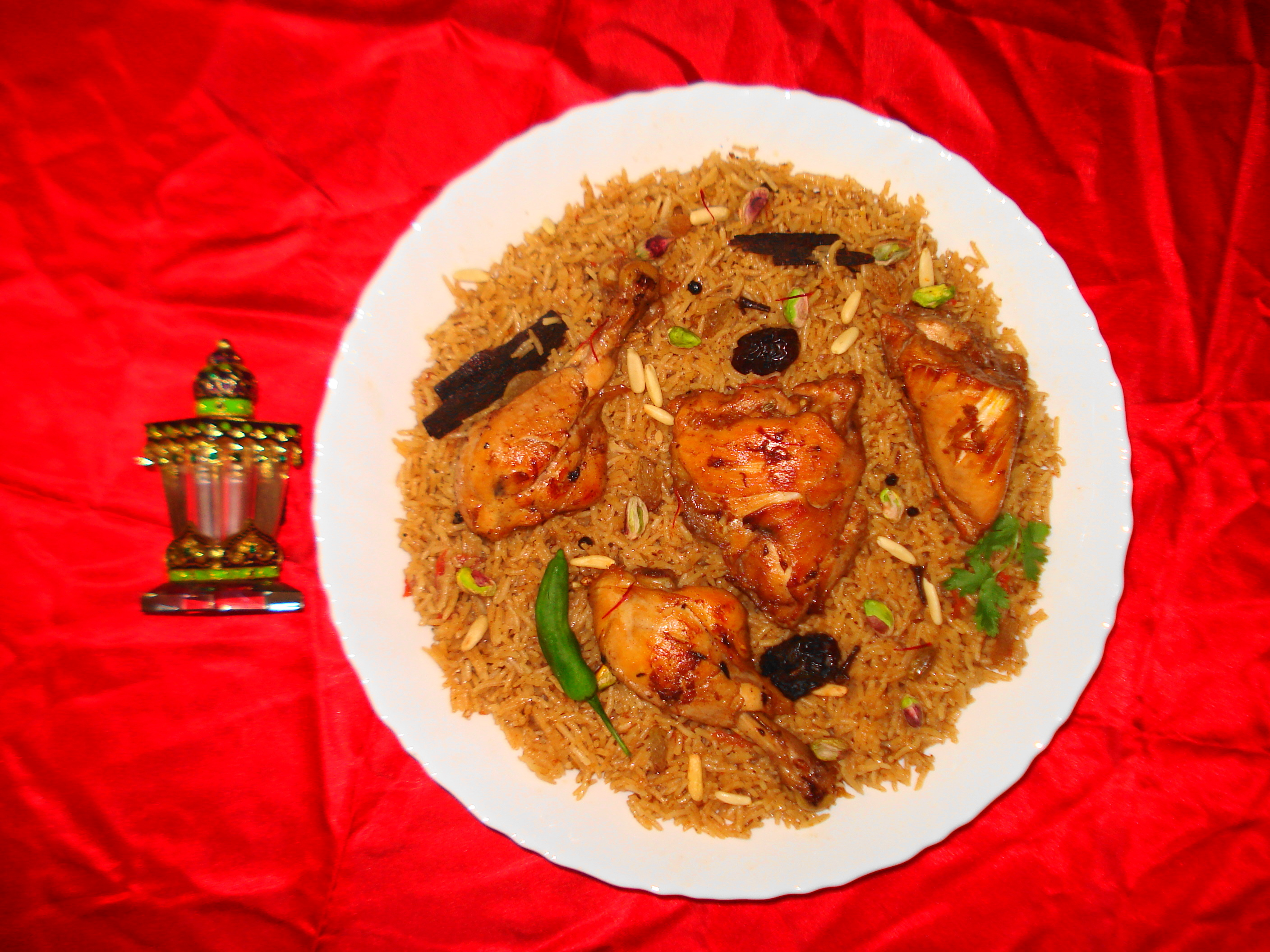
Machbous, a variation of kabsa

=== Qatari machbous ===
Machbous is the national dish of Qatar and consists of rice, meat, onions, and tomatoes mixed with spices, traditionally the bizar spice mix. Garlic, ginger, parsley and hot peppers may also be added. This dish is the local variation of kabsa. It is similar to biryani or pulao.

=== Ghuzi ===
Ghuzi is a whole roast lamb served over nutty rice. It is also called shuwaa.

=== Madrouba ===
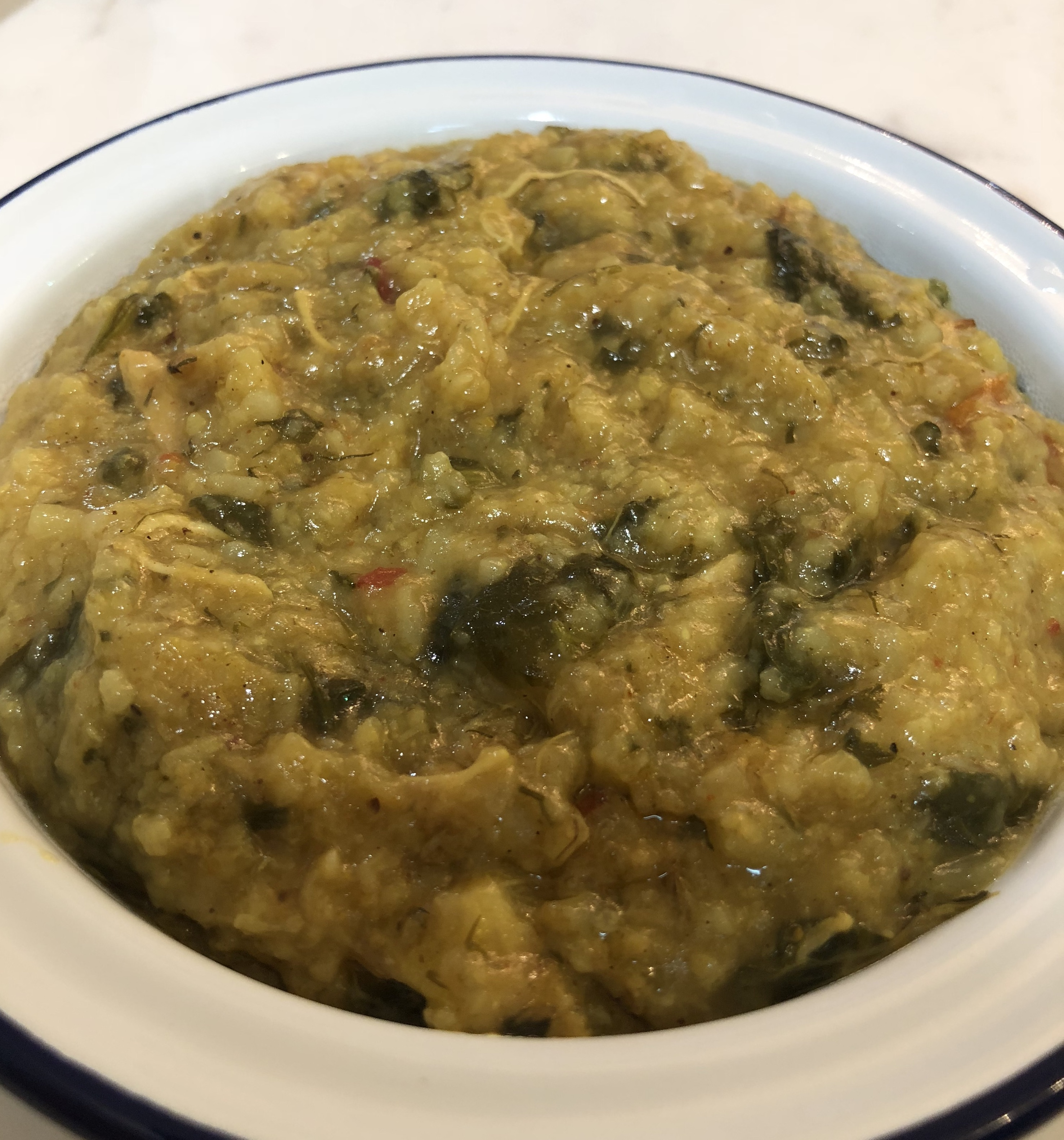
Madrouba

Madrouba is a spicy and comforting Qatari porridge made with chicken, overcooked rice, and a plethora of flavorings such as turmeric, cumin, cardamom, ginger, cloves, cinnamon, garlic, and black pepper. It is recommended to serve madrouba while it is still piping hot, preferably garnished with fresh lime zest.

=== Harees ===
Harees is a dish made from grinding wheat seeds and mixing it with fat (ghee). Salt and water are added, and it can be prepared with chicken or meat.

=== Jareesh ===
Jareesh is a chopped chicken dish consisting of ghee, wheat and onions, and topped with onions and green peppers.

=== Khobes rgag ===
Khobes rgag is a thin flatbread that is made of flour, water and salt, and is also used in other dishes like thareed.

=== Thareed ===
Thareed is a mixture of khobes rgag and broth, vegetables, and either chicken or meat.

=== Saloona ===
Saloona is made of any broth, with the meat and vegetables of the cook's choice, and spices.

== Desserts ==
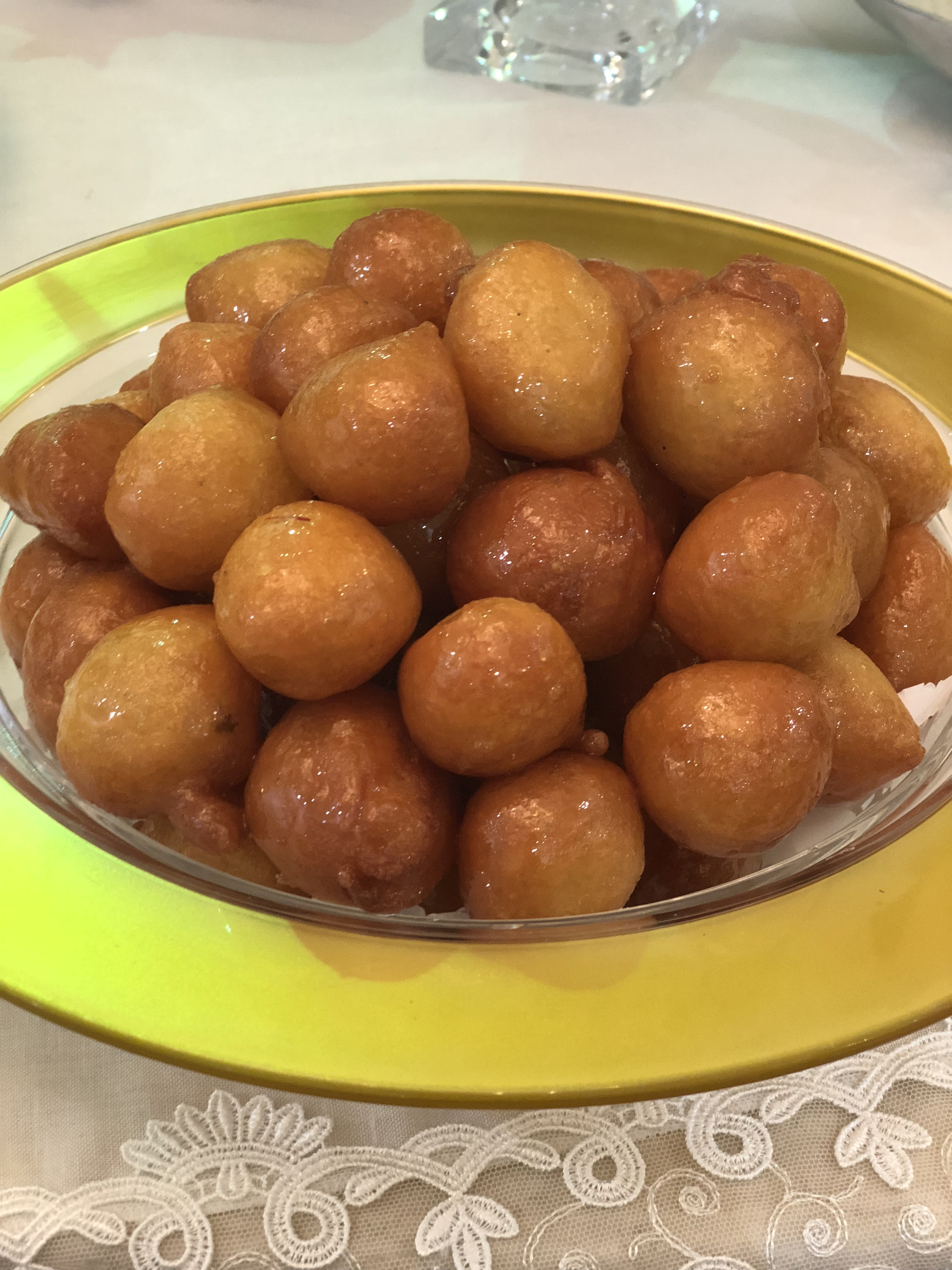
Luqaimat

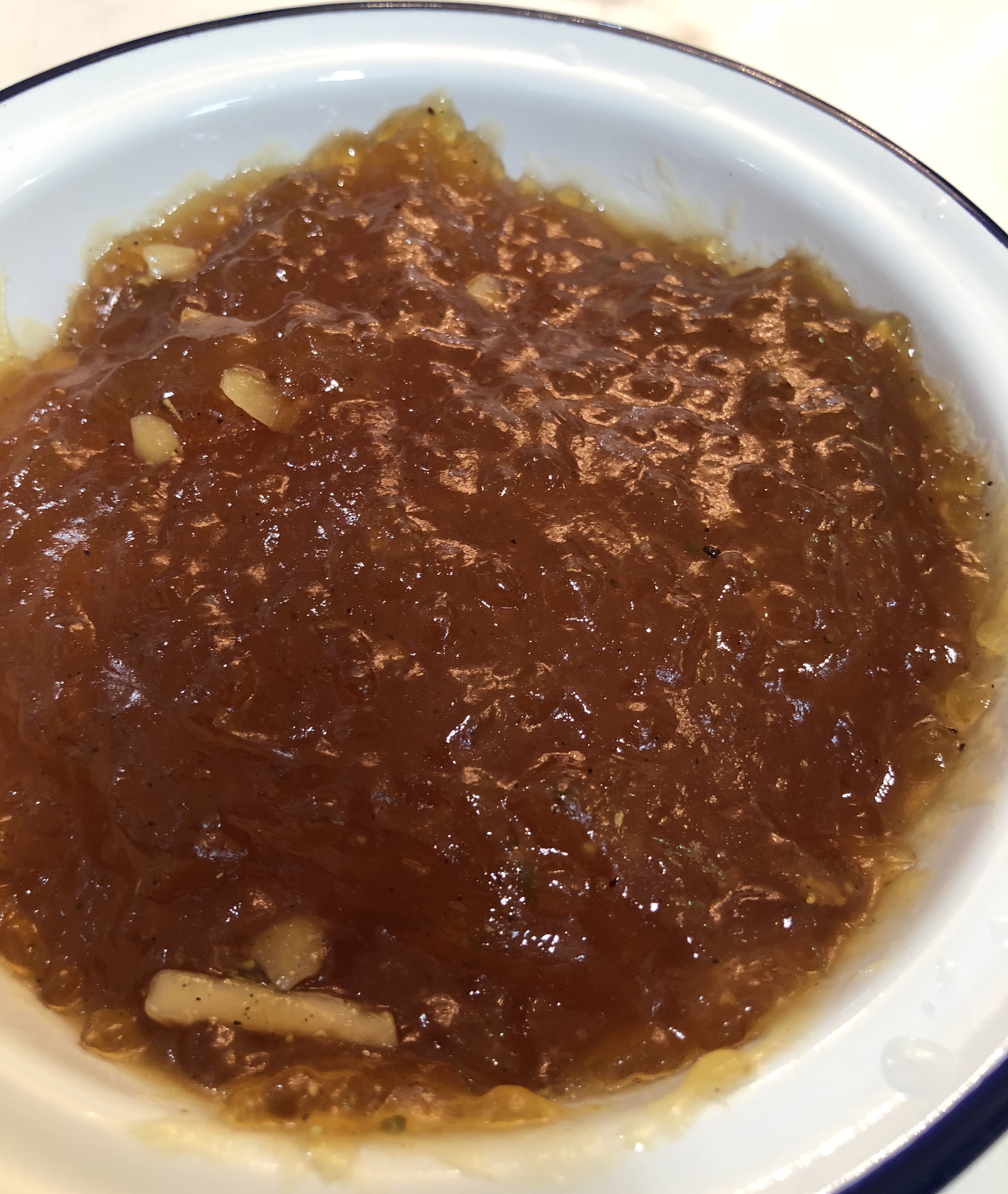
Sago

=== Luqaimat ===
Luqaimat is a dessert made of leavened and deep-fried dough balls. The ingredients used to create this sweet pastry are flour, milk, butter, sugar, saffron and cardamom. After it is fried and ready to be served, honey or a sweet syrup is poured on top of it.

=== Khabees ===
Khabees are seedless dates soaked in water, combined with roasted flour and mixed with sugar, oil, butter, saffron, cardamom and rose water.

=== Asida ===
Asida is a sweet dish made with flour, oil and sugar.

=== Balaleet ===
Balaleet are noodles cooked with sugar, cinnamon, saffron and cardamom. There is often an omelette on top.

=== Sago ===
Sago is a Qatari sweet gelatin pudding spiced with saffron and cardamom. It can be found in Saudi Arabia and the United Arab Emirates as well.

=== Umm Ali ===
Umm Ali is a bread and rice pudding. This dish originates in Egypt, and the Qatari version is said to deviate from it slightly.

=== Al-Qars Al-Uqaili ===
Al-Qars Al-Uqaili is a popular dessert in Qatari cuisine. Known for its delicate texture, it is made from a thin dough that is cooked until it reaches a golden brown hue. The dough is then sliced into circular pieces.

== Drinks ==
=== Arabic coffee ===
Traditionally paired with dates, coffee is deeply entrenched in Qatari culture, reflects centuries of tradition and globalization. Originating from either Ethiopia or Yemen and later popularized in the Arab world, Arabic coffee, or gahwa, is among the most popular beverages in Qatar. The preparation and consumption of Arabic coffee are steeped in rituals, with the brewing process and serving customs passed down through generations. In Qatari households, the making of Arabic coffee is considered a serious affair, often involving the use of high-quality green coffee beans, saffron, cardamom, cloves, and other traditional ingredients. These ingredients are carefully selected and sometimes ground by hand, reflecting the meticulous attention to detail in crafting the perfect cup of gahwa.

In modern Qatari society, the tradition of Arabic coffee remains vibrant, with majlises serving as contemporary hubs for socializing and discussion, reminiscent of historical coffeehouses. While traditional Arabic coffee remains paramount in Qatari culture, younger generations have embraced a diverse coffee culture, leading to the proliferation of specialty coffee shops in Doha which offer a range of brews and blends.

=== Karak ===
Karak, also known as "tea with milk" or "chai milk", is a bright orange mixture with cardamom, saffron, and sugar. Consisting of tea simmered with a mixture of spices along with evaporated milk, karak, while being popular, is not as widespread among the locals as gahwa (Arabic coffee).
