= Kheer =

Sweet pudding dish from Indian subcontinent

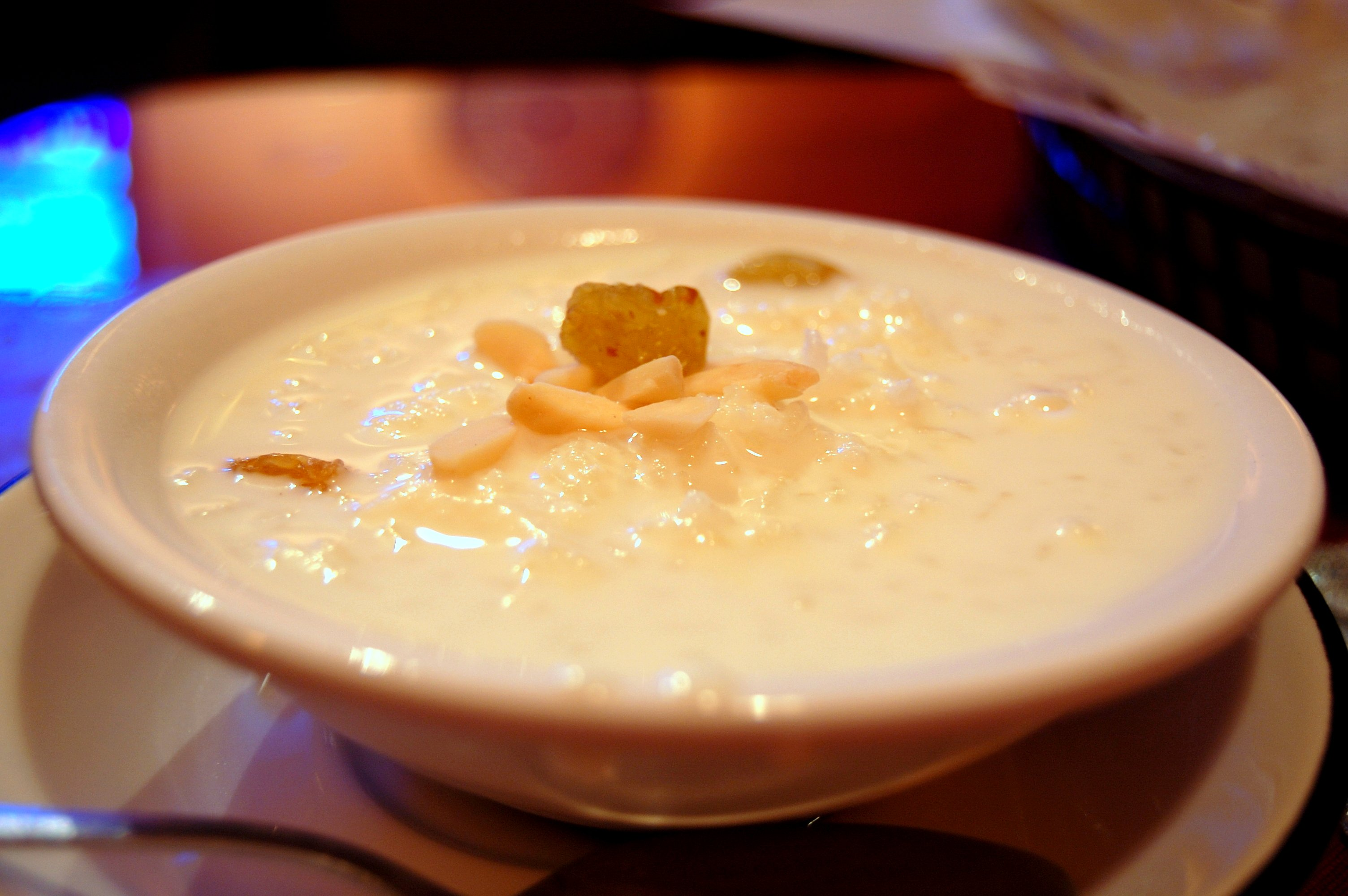
- A bowl of kheer
- Alternative names: khir, ksheerannam, doodhpak, doodh pheni, payesh, payasam, meetha bhat (sometimes misunderstood as mayasam), sweet rice
- Type: Pudding
- Course: Dessert
- Place of origin: South Asia
- Main ingredients: Rice, milk, sugar, cardamom, jaggery, saffron, pistachios or almonds
- Variations: Doodhpak, doodh pheni, ksheerannam, Vermicelli (semiya) kheer, Barley kheer, kaddu ki kheer, paal (milk) payasam, payesh, chhanar payesh (payesh made with chhana or paneer)
- Food energy (per serving): 249 kcal (1,040 kJ)

Kheer, khir, ksheerannam, payesh, doodh pheni, payasam, meetha bhat, or sweet rice, is a pudding or porridge (specifically rice pudding) popular in the Indian subcontinent, usually made by boiling milk, sugar or jaggery, and rice. It can be additionally flavoured with dried fruits, nuts, cardamom and saffron. Instead of rice, it may contain cracked wheat, vermicelli (sevai), sago, or tapioca (sabudana).

In Northern India, it is made in various ways. The most common versions are the ones made with rice and vermicelli (semiya). In Nepal, kheer tends to be thicker and uses fewer ingredients.

== Etymology ==
The word kheer is derived from the Sanskrit word kshira (क्षीर), which means milk or "milk-based dish". Kheer is also the archaic name for sweet rice pudding.

The word payasam used in South India for kheer originates from the Sanskrit term pāyasa (पायस), which means "milk" or a dish made from milk. This term evolved into various regional languages, including Malayalam (പായസം, pāyasaṁ), Telugu (పాయసం, pāyasaṁ), Kannada (ಪಾಯಸ, pāyasa), and Tamil (பாயசம், pāyasam).

== Origin ==
A story from Kerala titled "The Legend of Chessboard" holds that an old sage, who was Krishna in disguise, challenged the king of Ambalapuzha (chess enthusiasts) to a game. To motivate the sage, the king offered anything the old man would name. The sage modestly asked for a few grains of rice but with one condition: the king must put a single grain of rice on the first chess square and double it on every subsequent one.

Krishna, as the sage, won the game and the king started placing the grains. As he stacked them, he was shocked to see the number grow exponentially. In the end, the number came up to trillions. Krishna reveals himself and asks the king to provide kheer to every pilgrim who comes to what is now the Ambalapuzha Krishna Temple in the Alappuzha District, which still follows this command.

According to the food historian K. T. Achaya, kheer (or payasam, as it is known in South India) was a popular dish in ancient India. First mentioned in ancient Indian literature, it was a mixture of rice, milk and sugar. Payasam was also a staple food in Hindu temples in particular, where it is served as Prasāda to devotees.

== In culture ==
In Nepal, kheer holds cultural and agricultural significance and is celebrated with Khir Khane Din ("the day of eating kheer"), celebrated annually on Shrawan 15 of the Bikram Sambat calendar, usually in late July or early August in the Gregorian calendar. The day marks the completion of the paddy-planting season, occurring exactly one month after Nepal's National Paddy Day. As paddy cultivation is highly labor-intensive, eating kheer is culturally believed to provide farmers with nourishment and rejuvenation after weeks of working in muddy monsoon terraces.

== Gallery ==
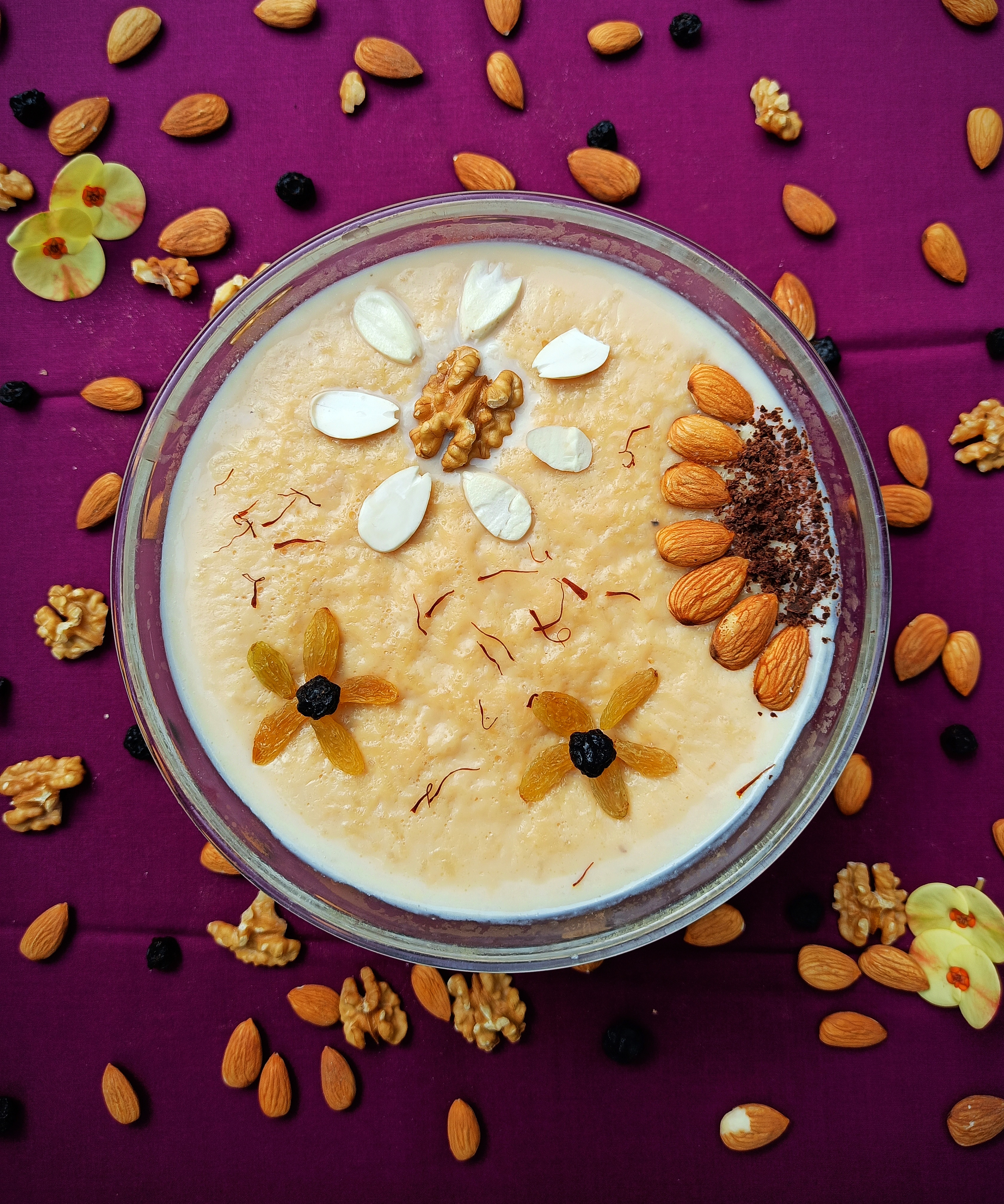
Kheer topped with dried fruits and nuts

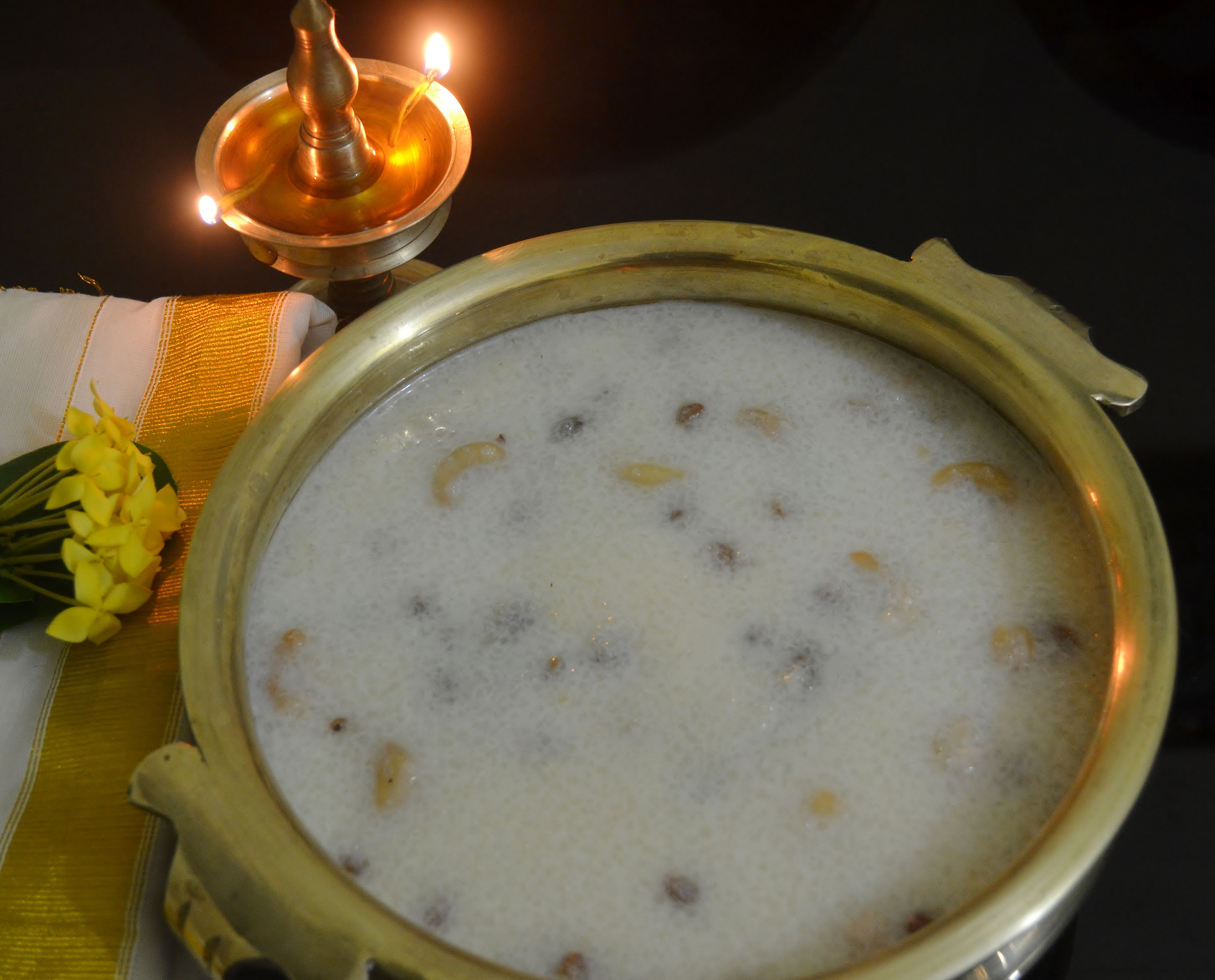
Kheer

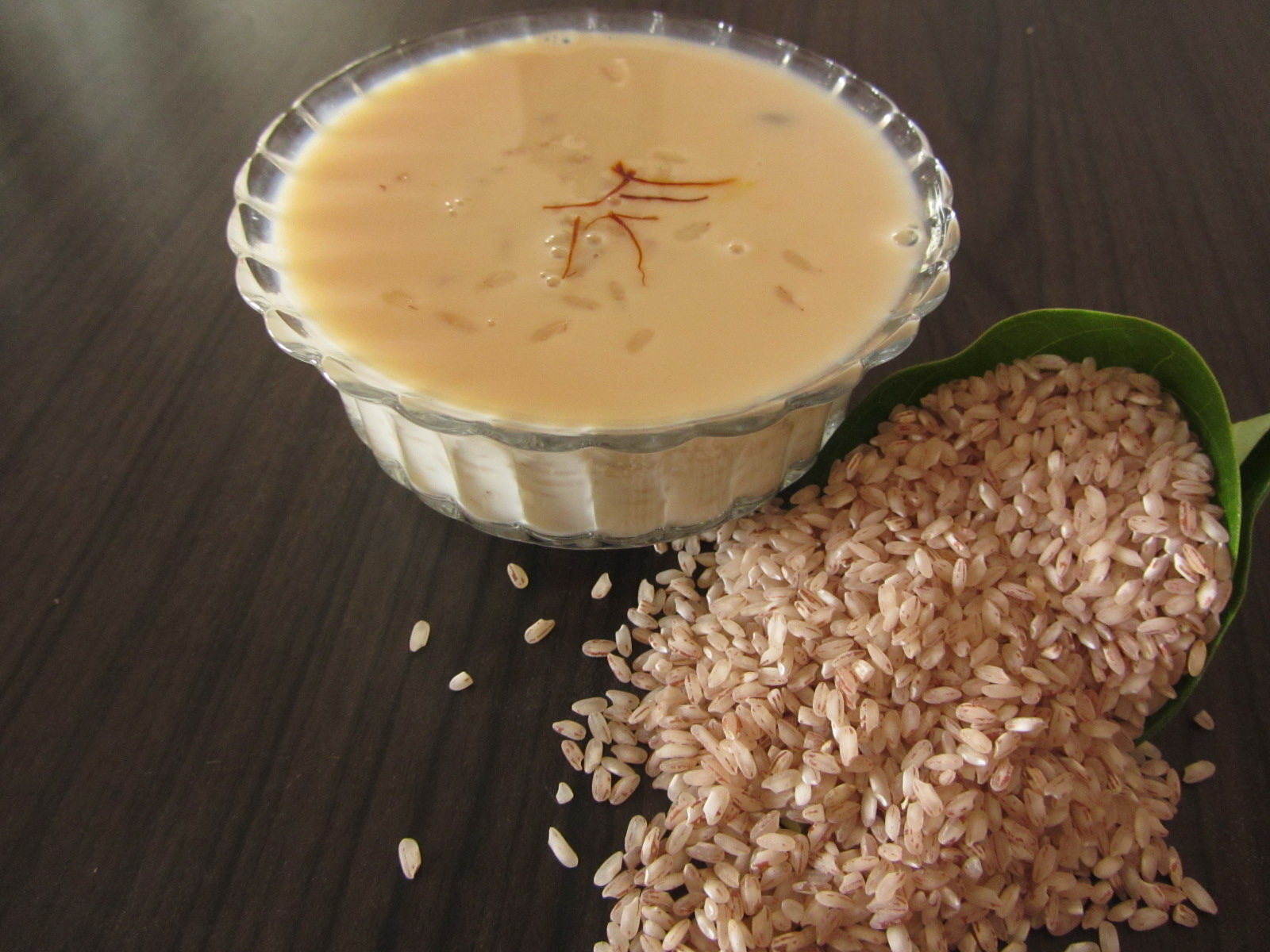
Paal payasam

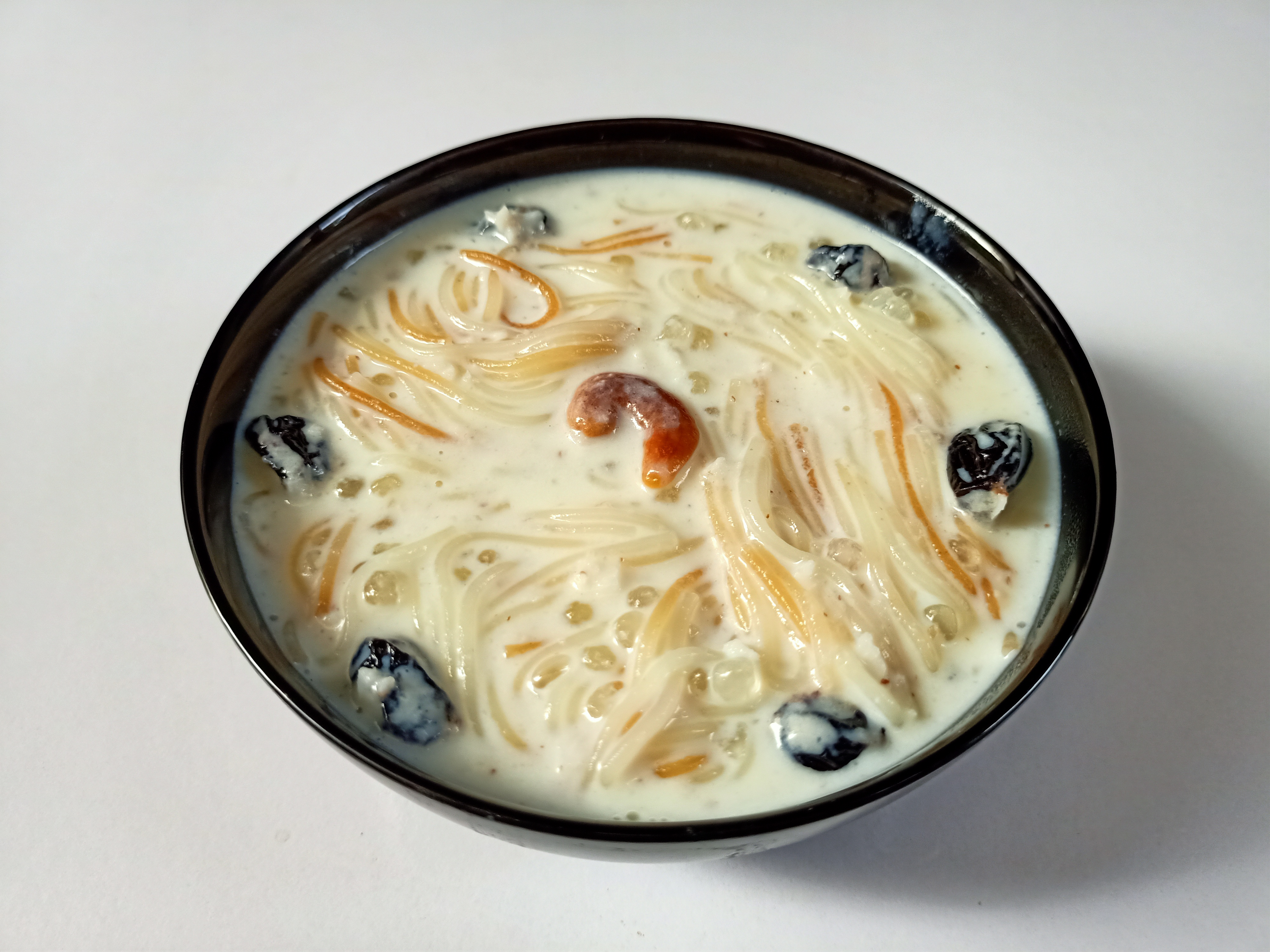
Kheer with vermicelli (called seviyan kheer, semiya payasam or shemai)

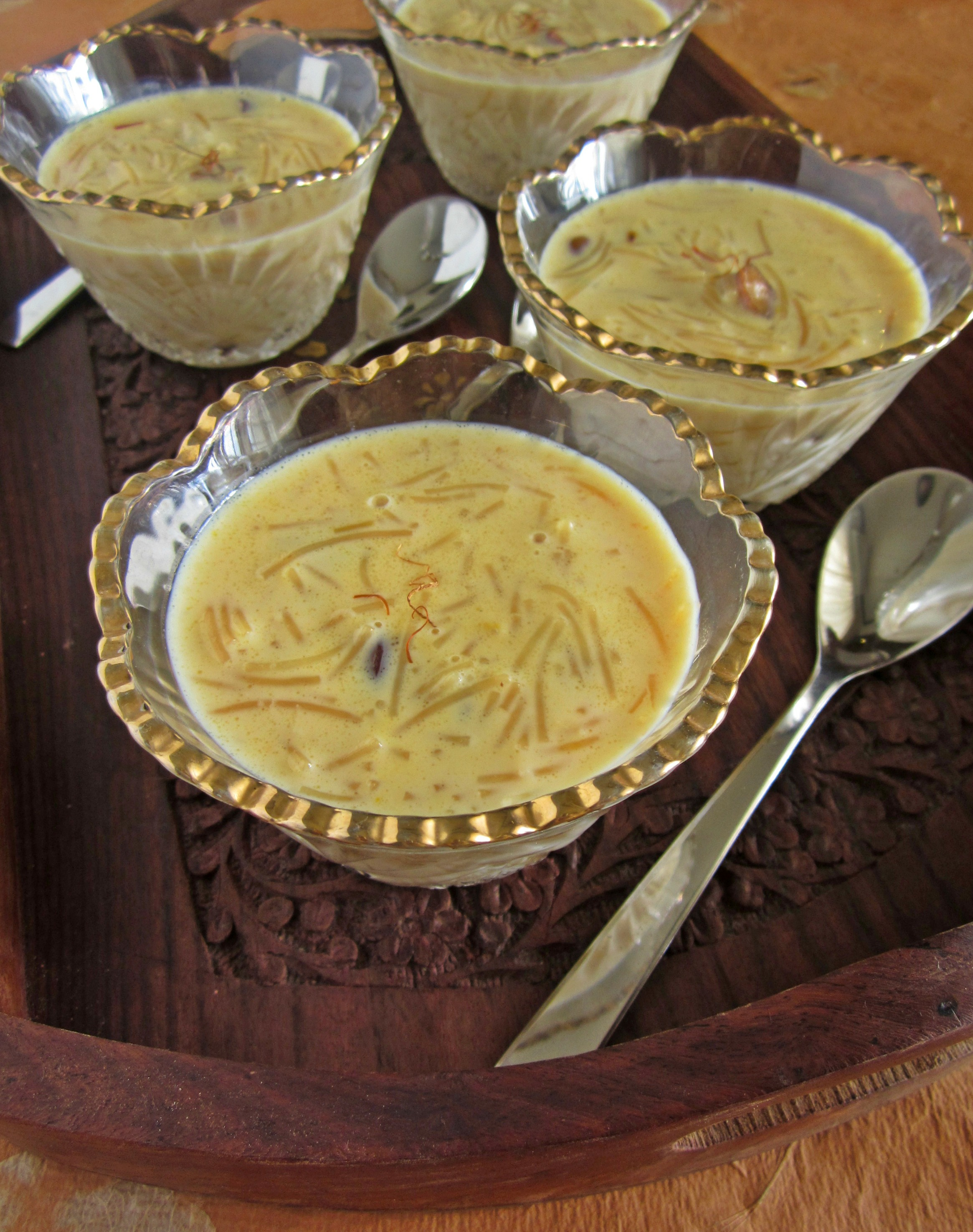
Vermicelli kheer

== See also ==
- Porridge
- Phirni – a dessert made with ground rice or rice flour cooked in milk and eaten chilled
- Shir Berenj – Persian rice pudding
- Doodhpak – Gujarati rice pudding
- Shemai – Bengali vermicelli pudding
- Sheer khurma – Persian vermicelli pudding
