= Kshira =

Sanskrit term for milk

Kshira (Sanskrit: क्षीर, romanized: Kṣīra) is a Sanskrit word for milk. Kshira is also the archaic name for sweet rice pudding kheer, popular in the Indian subcontinent. The term kshira is used and perceived differently from commonplace milk, termed dugdha in Sanskrit. Kshira also variably refers to any liquid or watery substance.

In Hindu mythology and cosmogony, the Kshira Sagara (Sanskrit: क्षीरसागर, IAST: Kṣīra Sāgara; Tamil: Tiruppāṟkaṭal; Malayalam: Pālāḻi; Telugu: Pala Samudram) is the abode of the god Vishnu. The Vishnu Purana narrates the Samudra Manthana, or the churning of this ocean, by devas (gods) and asuras (demons) to produce sacred items including the elixir of life known as amrita.

== In popular culture ==
- Kheer
- Sheer khurma
- Kshira Sagara, or milk ocean
- Sheera as a sweet porridge, alternatively known as Halva.
- Sheermal
- Shirodhara, as an Ayurvedic therapy.
- Kshira, brand name of dairy products produced by DS Group.
- Ksirodakasayi Vishnu, expanded form of Vishnu, residing in the Kshira Sagara.

== See also ==
- Ocean of Milk
- Kheer
- Payasam
- Sheermal
