= Balaleet =

Sweet and savoury Arabian dish

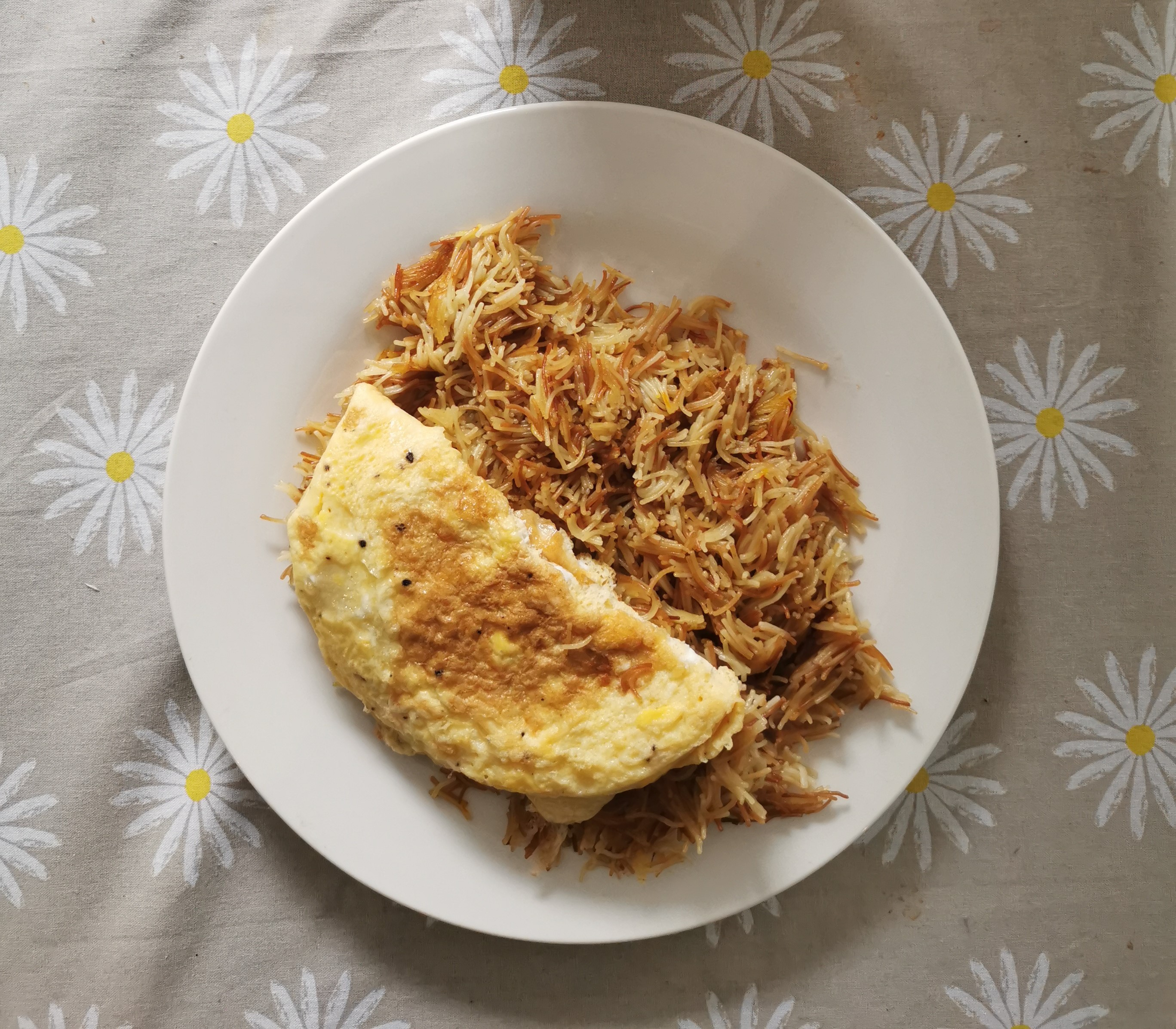
- A plate of homemade balaleet
- Type: Dessert
- Place of origin: Kuwait, Oman, United Arab Emirates,Bahrain, Qatar
- Region or state: Persian Gulf
- Serving temperature: Hot
- Main ingredients: vermicelli, cardamom, rose water and saffron

Balaleet or balalit (Arabic: بلاليط) is a traditional sweet and savoury dish popular in Eastern Arabian cuisine.

A popular breakfast choice, it traditionally consists of vermicelli sweetened with sugar, cardamom, rose water and saffron, and served with an overlying egg omelette. It is sometimes served with sautéed onions or potatoes. The dish is frequently served during the Islamic holidays of Eid al-Fitr as the first meal of the day.

== See also ==
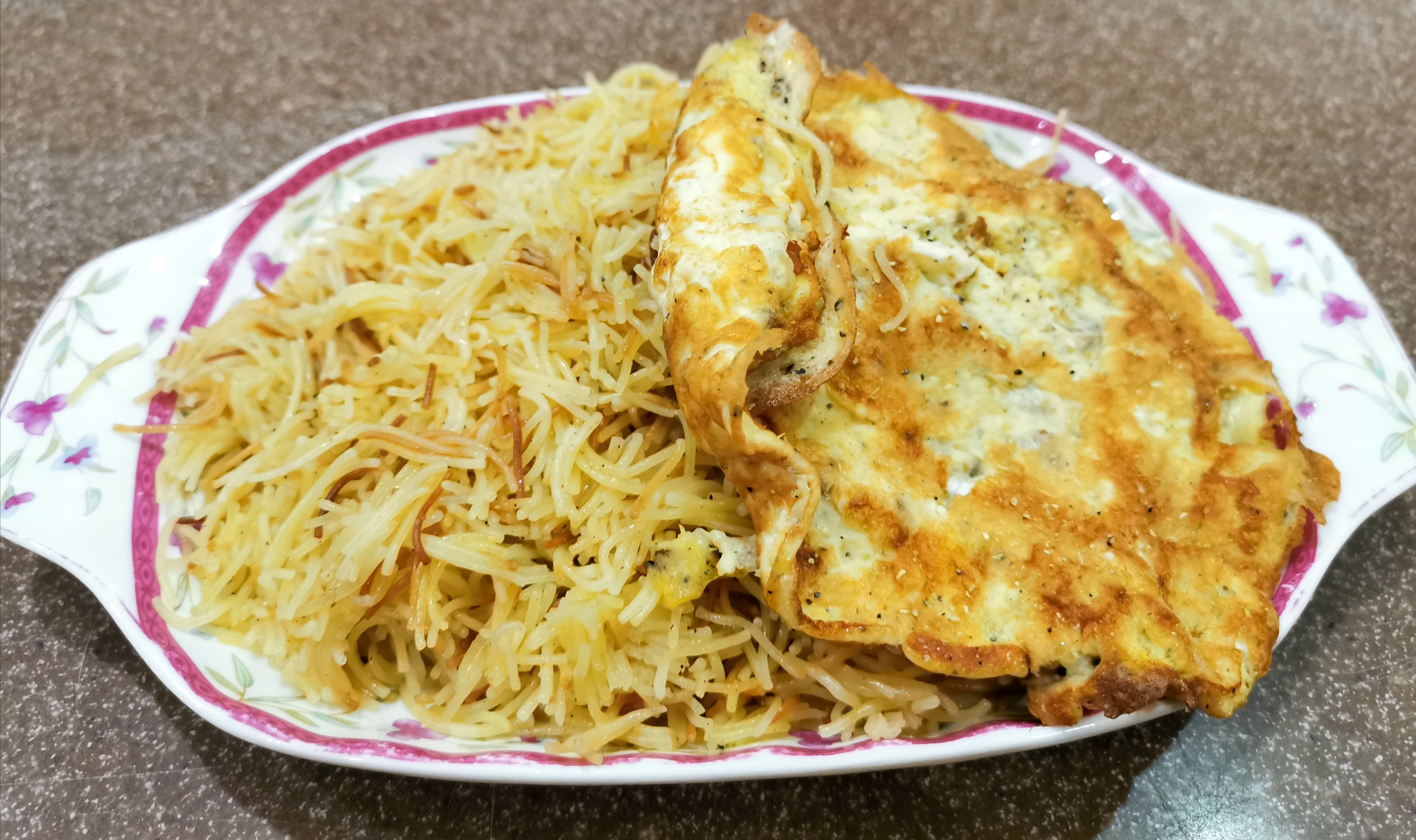
Homemade balaleet in Bahrain

- Falooda
- Sheer khurma
