= Boeber =

Ethnic cuisine of South Africa

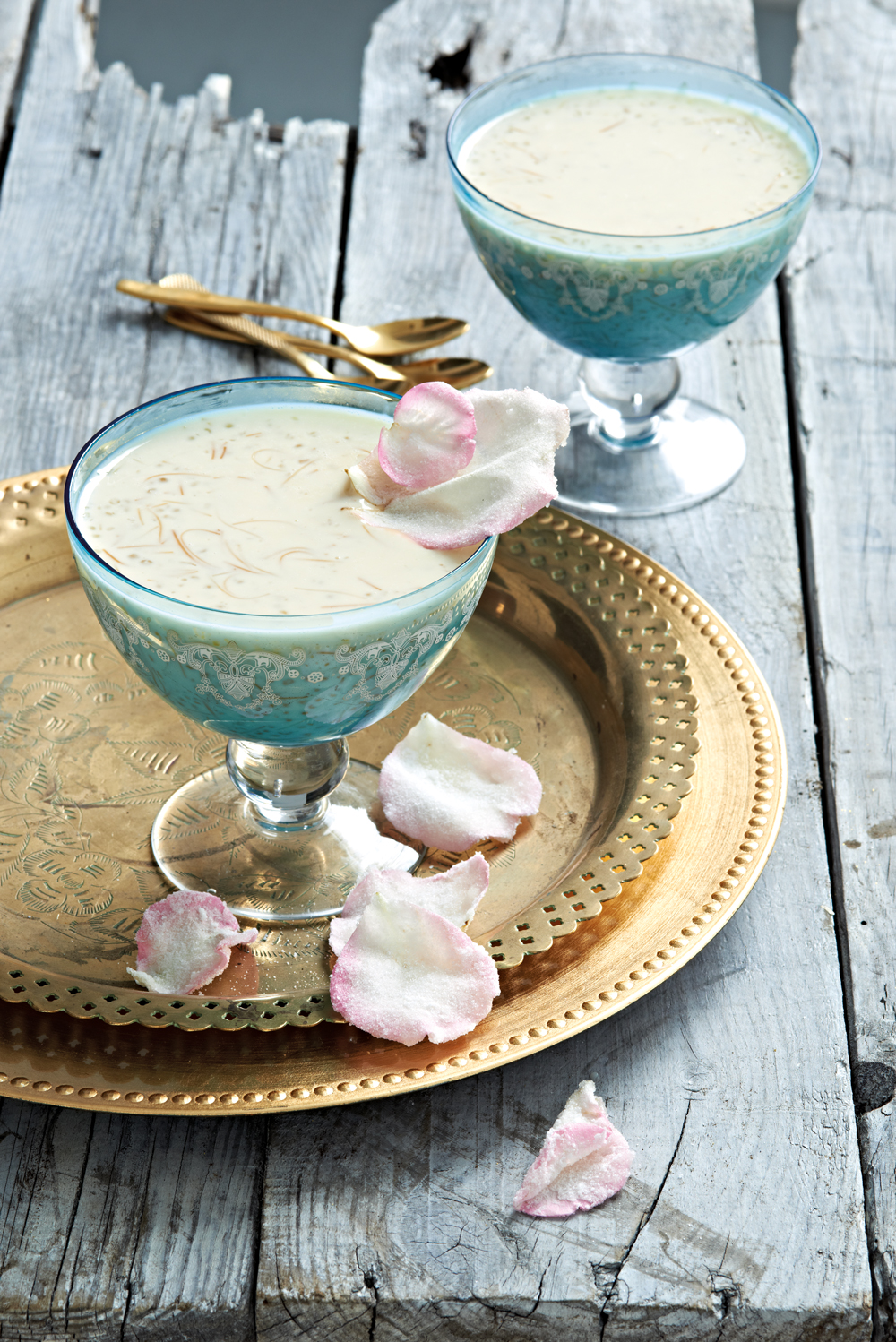
- Two boeber drinks
- Place of origin: South Africa
- Associated cuisine: Cape Malay

Boeber (pronounced [bubər]) is the Cape Malay name for a South African pudding. It has become a traditional Cape Malay sweet, milk drink, made with vermicelli, sago, sugar, and flavoured with cardamom, stick cinnamon, and rose water. The pudding is traditionally served on the 15th night of Ramadan to celebrate the middle of the fast, for those who have completed the first 15 days of fasting. They are also known as people who are op die berg (lit. 'have reached the summit').

== Origin ==
In South Africa, boeber was originally made by Cape Malays, whose ancestors came from Indonesia, East Africa, and India. Bubur in modern Malay is the generic word for any kind of porridge. A similar drink called Sawine or Sewine is served in Trinidad and Tobago homes on Eid al-Fitr (the festival marking the end of Ramadan). Globally, there are similar drinks such as Asian kheer and sweet congee. Boeber bears the closest resemblance to kheer or payasam, a dessert hailing from the Indian subcontinent, which is likely to be either introduced by Indian slaves, or the 1860 Indentured Indian immigrants. In South Africa, an Afrikaans dish known as melkkos is similar to boeber. A boeber mix is available in some supermarkets, corner cafes, and spice shops in South Africa.
