= Jiangwan Mosque =

Mosque in Yangpu, Shanghai, China

- 江湾清真寺
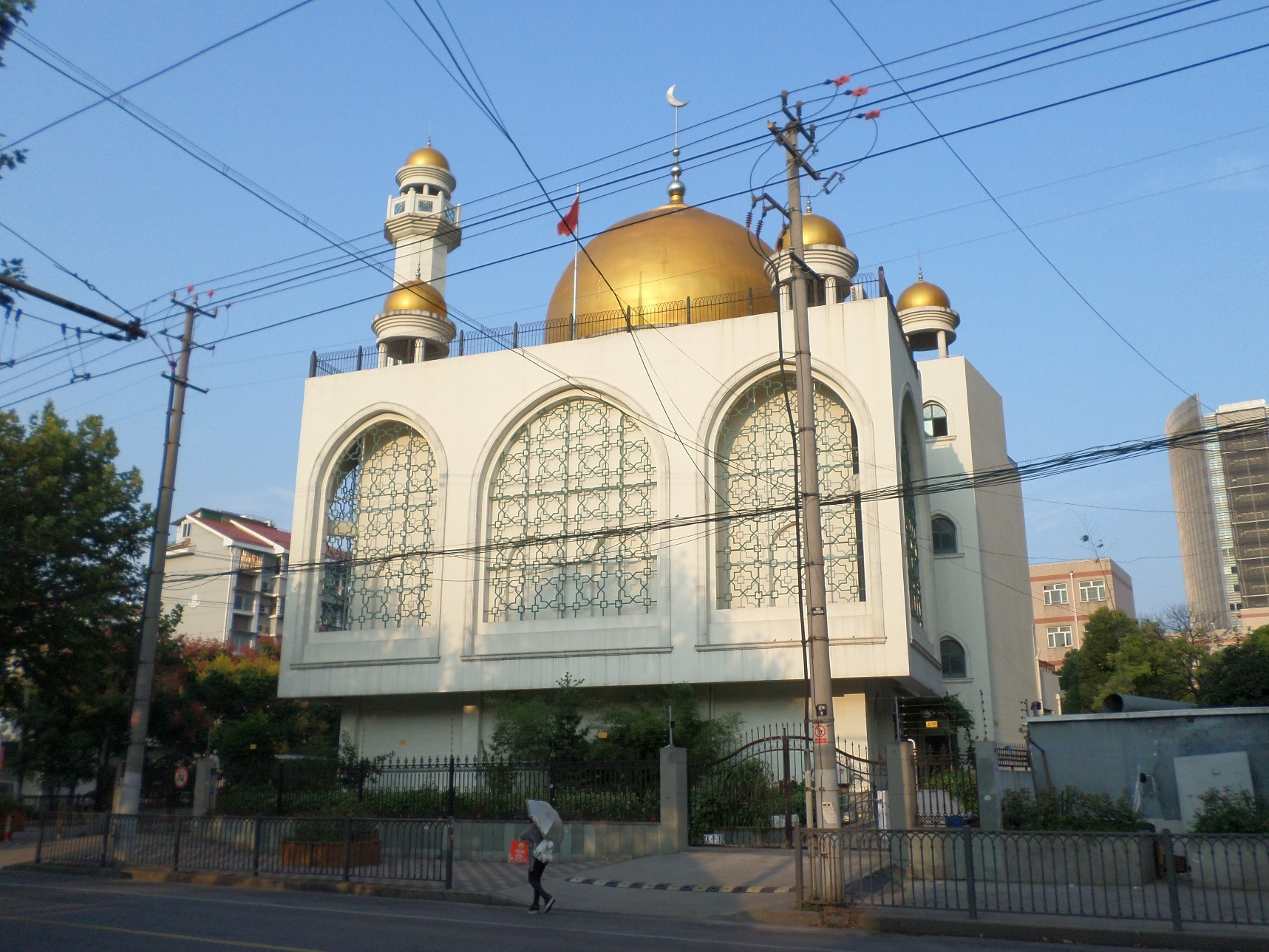

- Location of the mosque in Shanghai

Religion
- Affiliation: Sunni Islam
- Ecclesiastical or organizational status: Mosque
- Status: Active

Location
- Location: 86 Zhengfu Road, Yangpu, Shanghai
- Country: China
- Interactive map of Jiangwan Mosque
- Coordinates: 31°18′34″N 121°30′56″E

Architecture
- Type: Mosque
- Completed: 1928

Specifications
- Dome: 1
- Minaret: 1 (maybe more)

The Jiangwan Mosque (simplified Chinese: 江湾清真寺; traditional Chinese: 江灣清真寺; pinyin: Jiāngwān Qīngzhēnsì) is a mosque in Yangpu District, Shanghai, China.

== Overview ==
The mosque was established in 1928.

The mosque is within walking distance south east of Sanmen Road Station of Shanghai Metro.

== Gallery ==
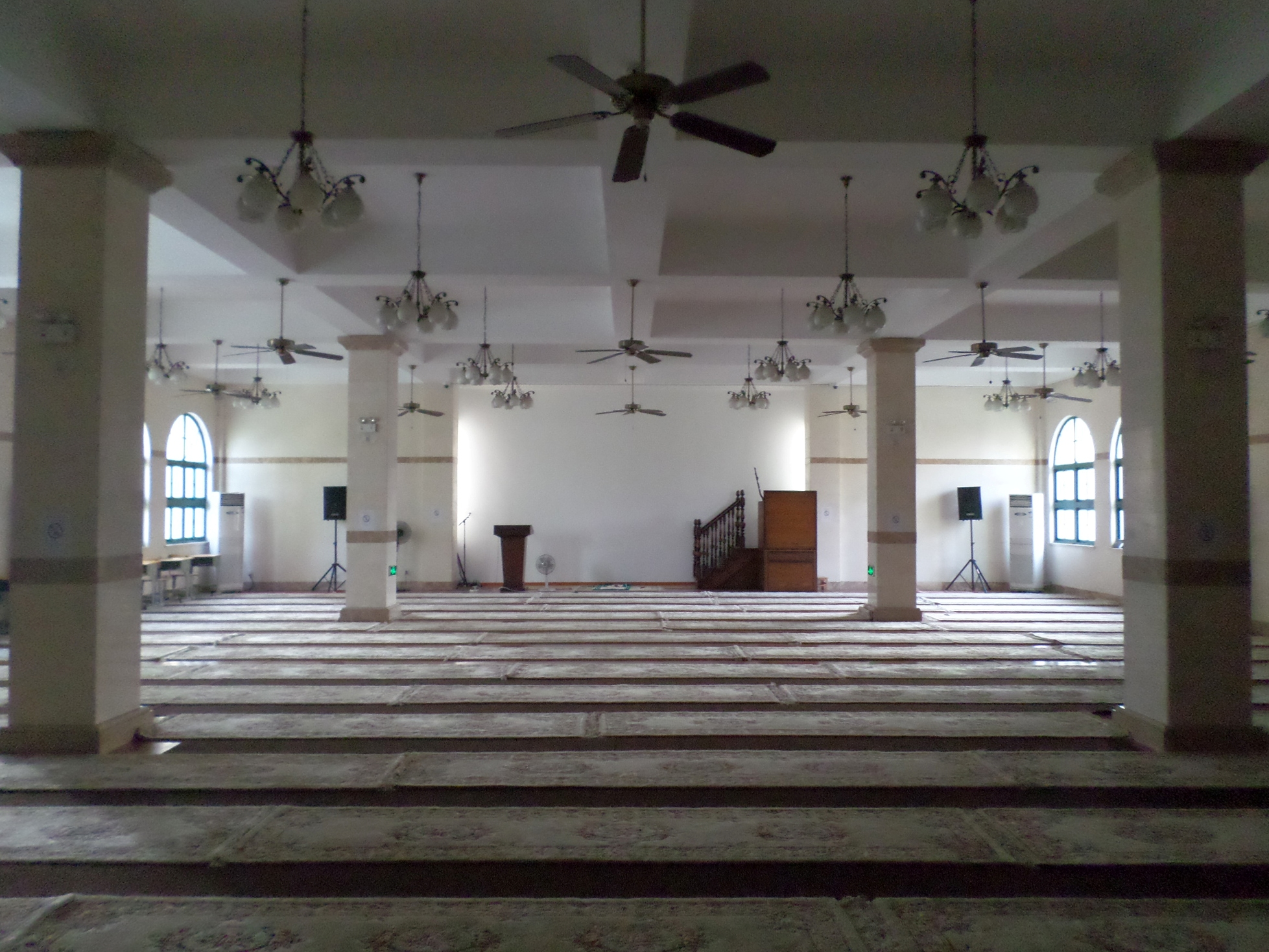
The mosque prayer hall

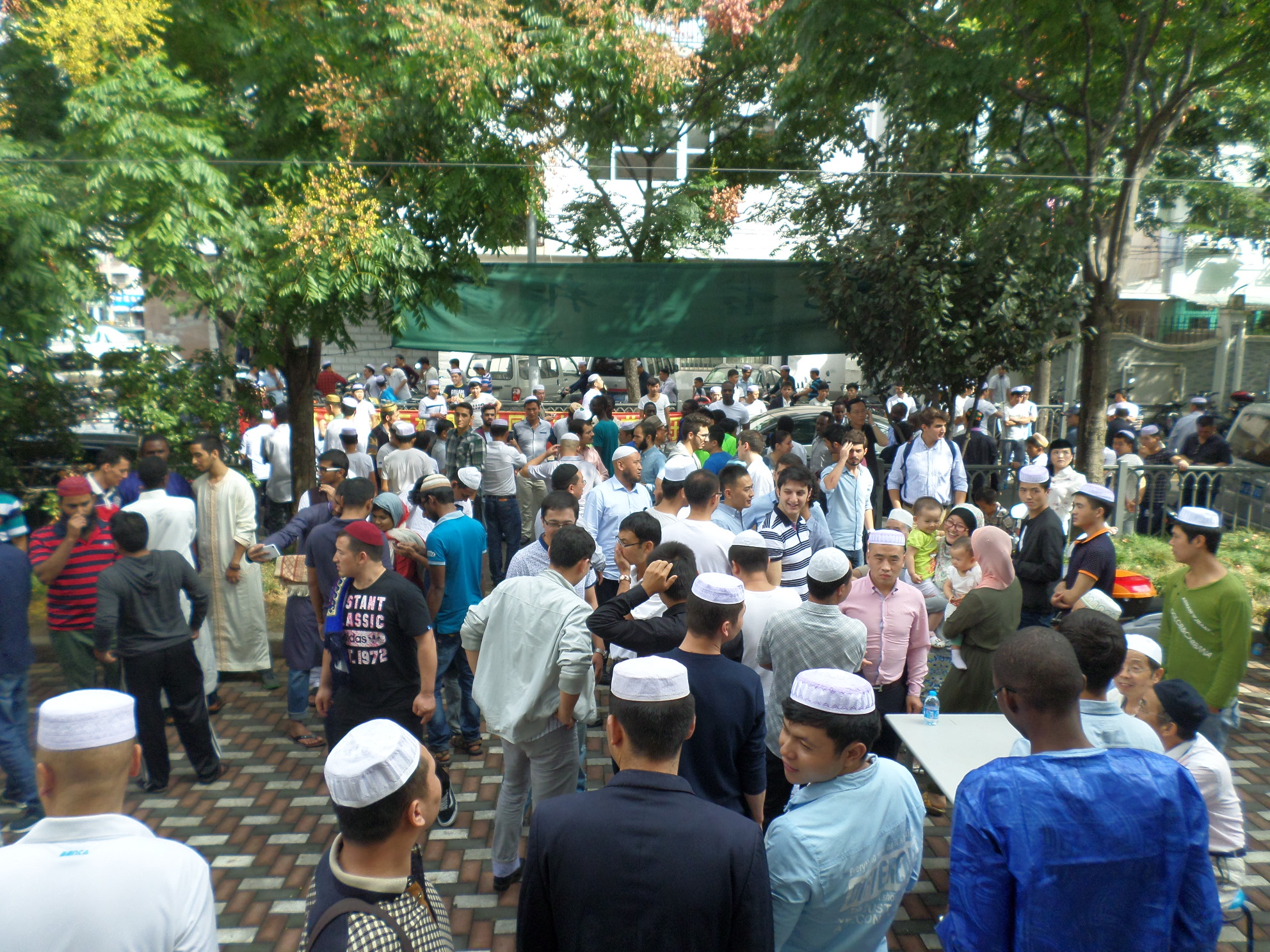
Eid al-Adha at the mosque

== See also ==
- Islam in China
- List of mosques in China
