= Shemai =

Traditional dessert in Bangladesh

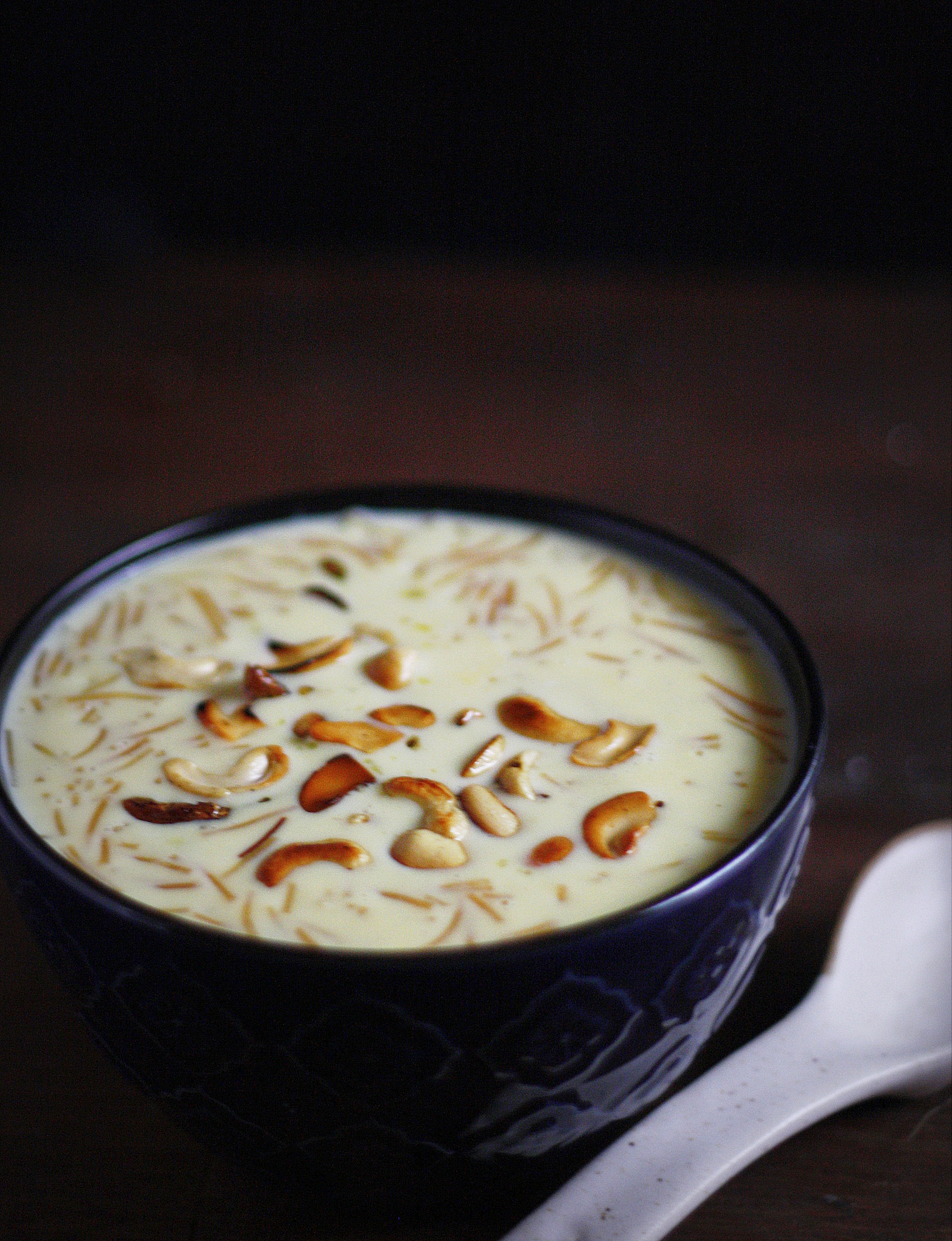
- Shemai
- Alternative names: সেমাই/সিমুই
- Type: dessert
- Place of origin: Bengal region
- Region or state: Bengal, South Asia
- Associated cuisine: Bangladesh, India
- Main ingredients: Vermicelli, milk, cashew nuts, cardamom, ghee
- Variations: Milk shemai, dry shemai

Shemai (Bengali: সেমাই, সিমুই) is a traditional dessert in Bangladesh and Indian state of Odisha and West Bengal. Shemai is popular during Eid, but consumed throughout the year. It is a dessert form of vermicelli, soaked in sweet milk and often garnished with nuts.

== Ingredients ==
The staple ingredients of shemai are milk, ghee, sugar, roasted vermicelli, and various assortments of nuts and spices. Shemai variations include a kheer version, dry fruits, and jodda shemai.

== History ==
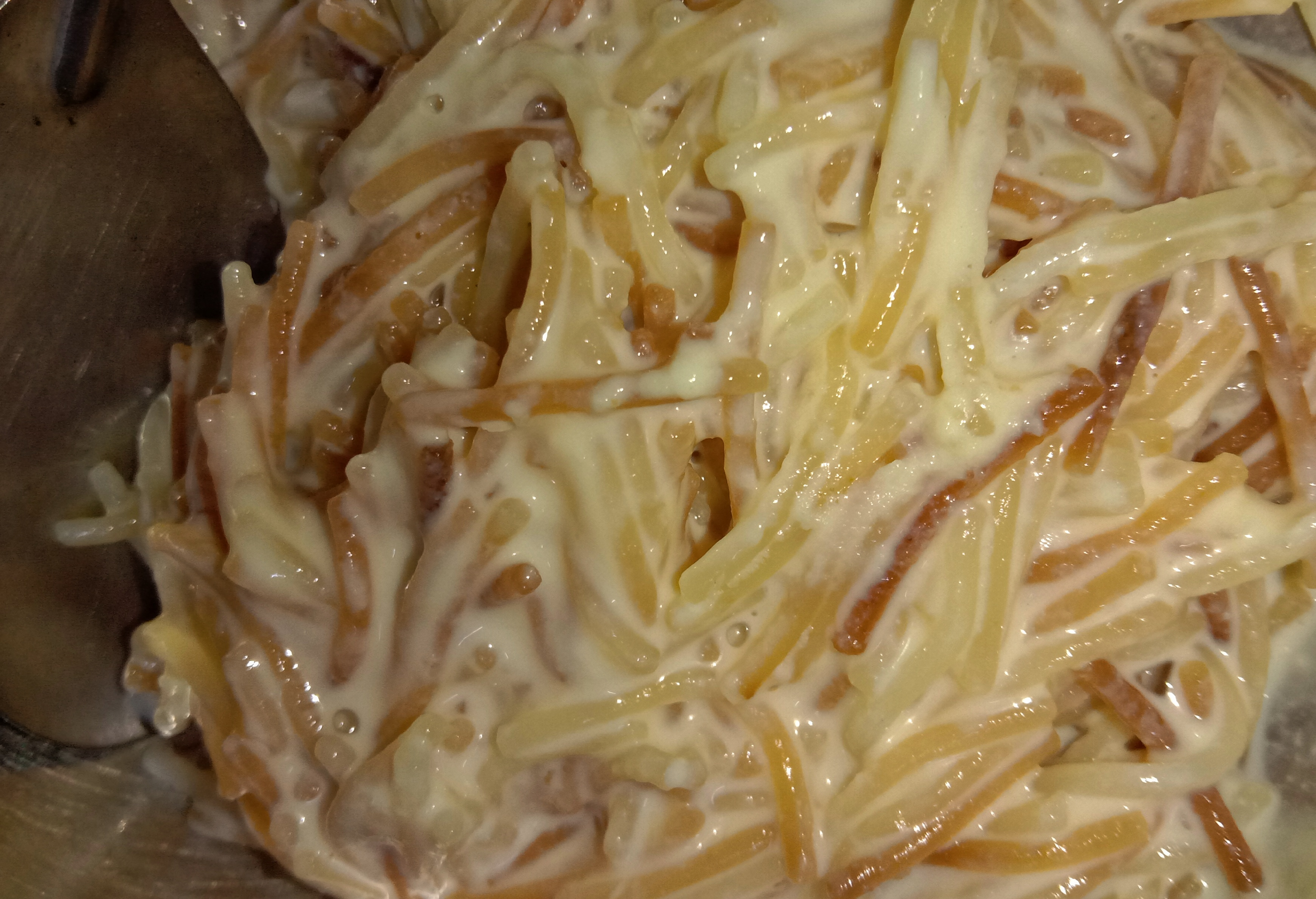
Closeup of shemai

Shemai originated from Bengal. Ice Today described shemai as a distant cousin of sheer khurma, an Afghan dessert, as well as seviyan, a pudding popular in North India and Pakistan. Some recipes use powdered milk and/or condensed milk.
