= Sangza =

Chinese fried noodle snack

Chinese name
- Simplified Chinese: 馓子
- Traditional Chinese: 饊子
Transcriptions
Standard Mandarin
- Hanyu Pinyin: Sǎnzi
- Wade–Giles: San3-tzu
other Mandarin
- Xiao'erjing: صًا ذِ

Uyghur name
- Uyghur: ساڭزا
Transcriptions
- Siril Yëziqi: Саңза

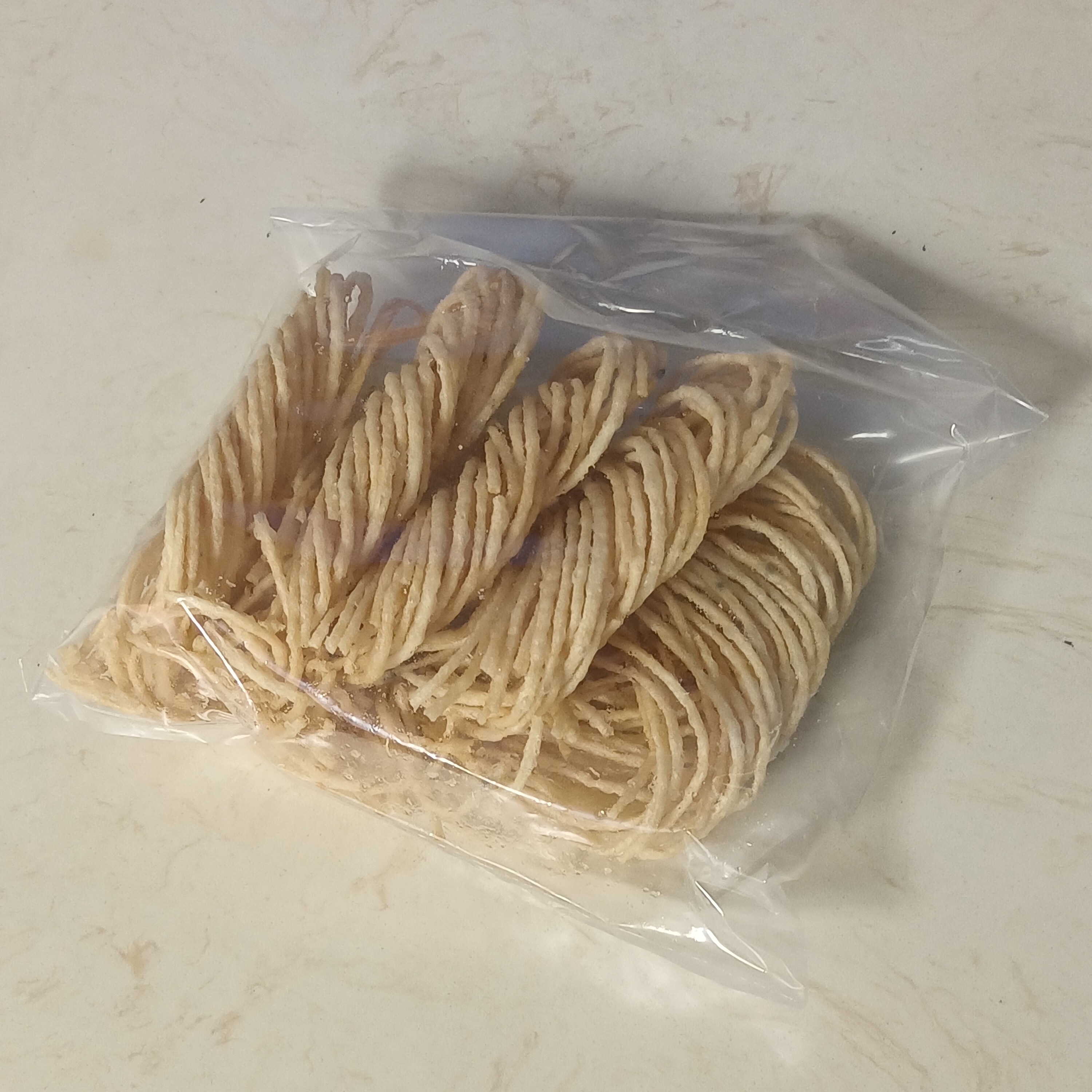
Sanzi from Jiangsu

Sangza (Uyghur: ساڭزا, Саңза; simplified Chinese: 馓子; traditional Chinese: 饊子, IPA: [sàn.tsi], Xiao'erjing: صًا ذِ) or sanzi is a deep-fried noodle snack from northern China. It is often eaten during holidays or given as a gift.

== Preparation ==
A well-rested wheat-flour dough is formed into ropes or strips. The dough is coiled, pulled into noodles, then deep-fried. Many recipes call for arranging the noodles into shapes before or during frying, and coating the dough with oil before pulling to prevent sticking.

== History ==
Sanzi may derive from Islamic fried pastries similar to jalebi or from hanju (寒具; 'cold-weather implements').

Hanju was a food associated with the Cold Food Festival, which was historically celebrated by abstaining from fire. Hanju also became popular outside of the festival, and it was eaten by the Han dynasty upper class as an early-morning snack. The 6th-century agricultural text Qimin Yaoshu described hanju, or huanbing (環餅; 'ring cakes'), as a crispy dough sweetened with honey or jujube molasses.

In the 12th-century text Jilei Bian, sanzi was given as another name for hanju or huanbing, and Su Shi is said to have composed a poem on the food at the request of a vendor while in Hainan. (Note: "食物中有饊子，又名環餅，或曰即古之寒具也。京師凡賣熟食者，必為詭異標表語言，然後所售益廣。嘗有貨環餅者，不言何物，但長嘆曰：「虧便虧我也！」謂價廉不稱耳。紹聖中，昭慈被廢居瑤華宮，而其人每至宮前，必置擔太息大言，遂為開封府捕而究之。無它，猶斷杖一百罪。自是改曰：「待我放下歇則個。」人莫不笑之，而買者增多。東坡在儋耳，鄰居有老嫗業此，請詩於公甚勤。戲云：「纖手搓來玉色勻，碧油煎出嫩黃深。夜來春睡知輕重，壓匾佳人纏臂金。」" [There is a food called sanzi, or huanbing, or what some say is the ancient hanju. In the capital, sellers of cooked food needed to use strange slogans to sell well. There was a huanbing vendor who without saying what he was talking about, would only sigh deeply and exclaim, "What a loss, what a loss for me!" He simply meant that his prices were too cheap. It was the Shaosheng era, when Zhaoci was deposed and sent to Yaohua Palace, and each time the vendor came in front of the palace he would set down his carrying pole, sighing and shouting, until he was arrested and investigated by the Kaifeng government. For only that, he was sentenced to a hundred strokes. From then on his cry was "Let me put this down and rest." Everyone laughed at him, and he gained customers. When Dongpo was in Dan'er, a local old woman selling these constantly asked him for a poem. He playfully composed, "Delicate hands roll them evenly jade-colored, green oil fries them deep light yellow. In last night's spring slumber I knew their weight, gold pressed flat around a beauty's arms."]) According to another text, one of the seven wonders of Nanjing is that hanju were crunchy enough to be heard miles away. In a short story written during the period, the emperor gives a courtesan several boxes of hanju and other gifts. By the Ming Dynasty (1368–1644), sanzi clearly referred to fried noodles, although they were also stated to be made with glutinous rice flour in Bencao Gangmu.

During the Qing dynasty, the imperial palace held Manchu and Han banquets. According to 1830 menus, the Manchu banquets for the New Year's Eve, new year, and the emperor's birthday had large quantities of small cakes, sanzi, and fruit—with up to 15 kg (33 lb) (Note: 3 platters, each 8 jin 8 liang) of red and white sanzi per person.

== Variations ==
Sangza or sanzi is eaten throughout China, with variations in ingredients, shape, and noodle thickness. Generally, the shape is looser to the north and more delicate to the south. It can be eaten on its own, soaked in soup, or as an ingredient in other dishes. It is often served to guests or given as a gift, such as for postpartum confinement.

In Uyghur cuisine, sangza is prepared and eaten at home for Eid al-Fitr and Eid al-Adha. The noodles, made with eggs, milk, and oil, are arranged into spiral mounds before being fried in sheep fat. In Changji, Xinjiang, sangza is also sold during Chinese New Year.

In Ningxia, Hui people prepare sanzi with eggs and a syrup flavored with Sichuan pepper and scallions. In Heze, Shandong, sanzi is produced as a local specialty and mainly eaten during holidays. In Zhumadian, Henan, sanzi includes sesame seeds and is eaten for Qingming Festival. In Huai'an, Jiangsu, they are called chasan (茶馓) and often eaten as tea snacks. In Jianghan, Hubei, the noodles, called hasan (哈馓), were included in bride dowries given during Dragon Boat Festival. In Hakka areas of Meizhou, Guangdong, sanzi is cut before being arranged. In Foshan, Guangdong, twisted dough sticks called danshan (茶馓) are made with egg, sesame, and fermented bean curd and eaten for Chinese New Year.

== Gallery ==
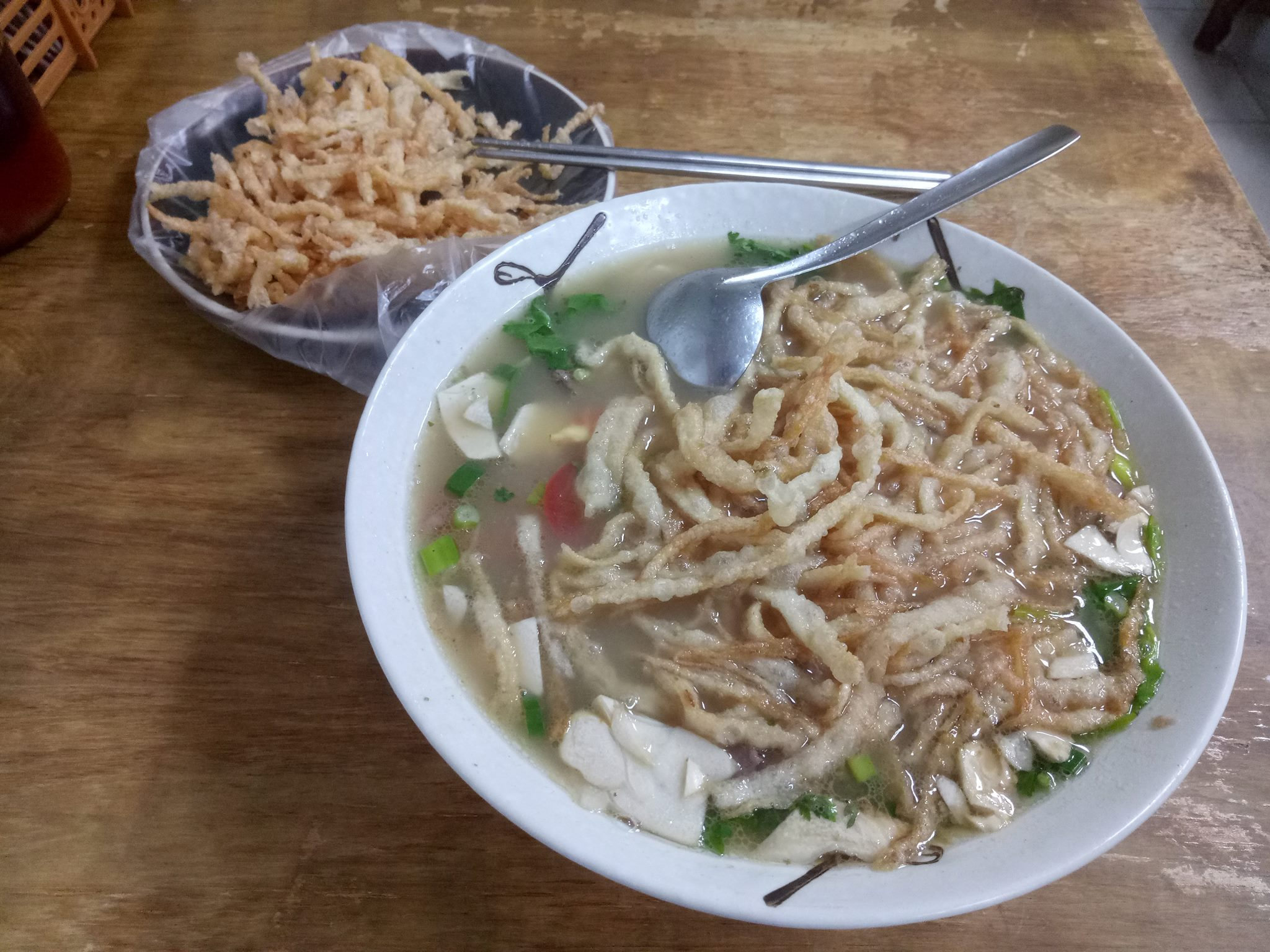
Sangza at a Uyghur restaurant

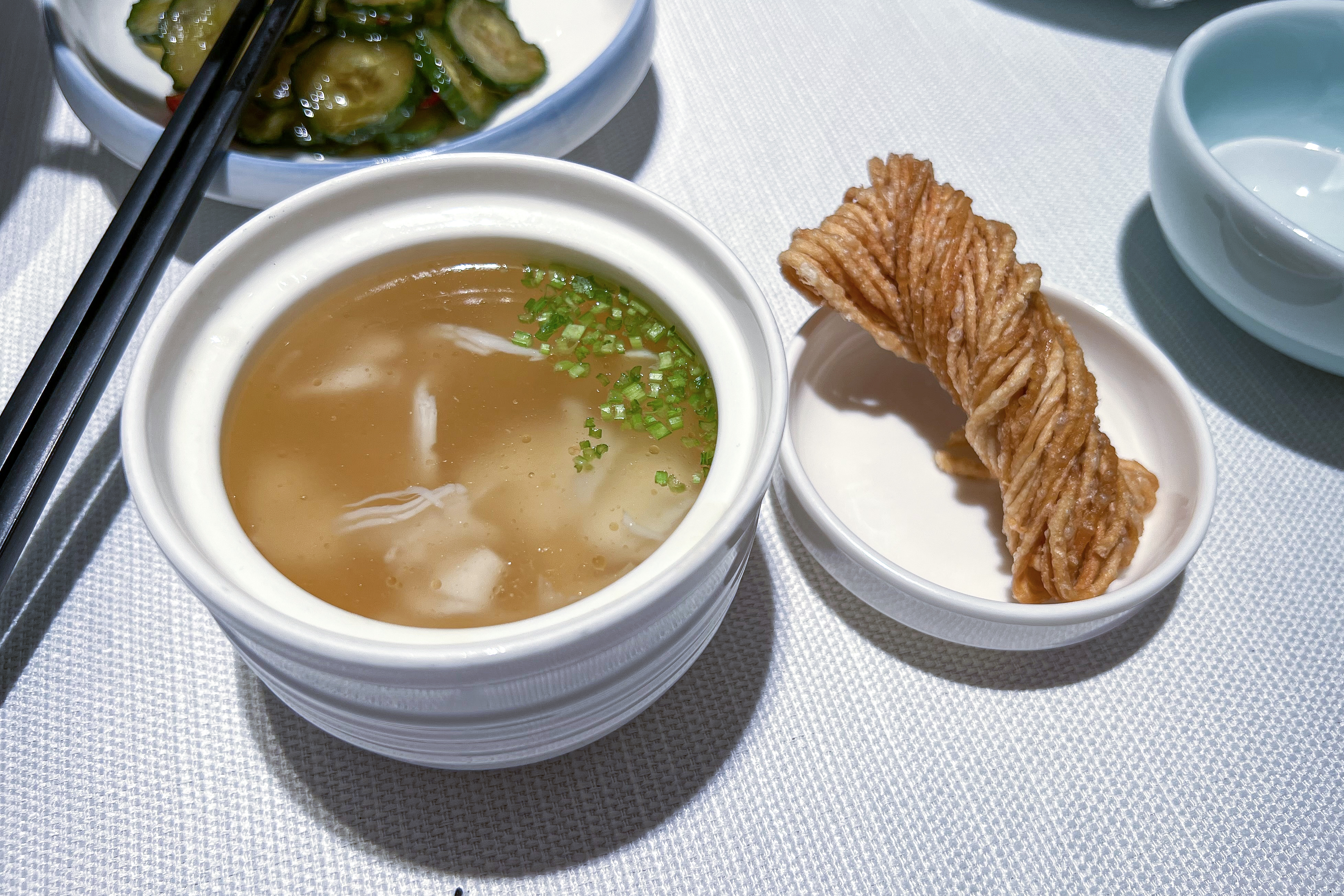
Sanzi at a Shandong restaurant

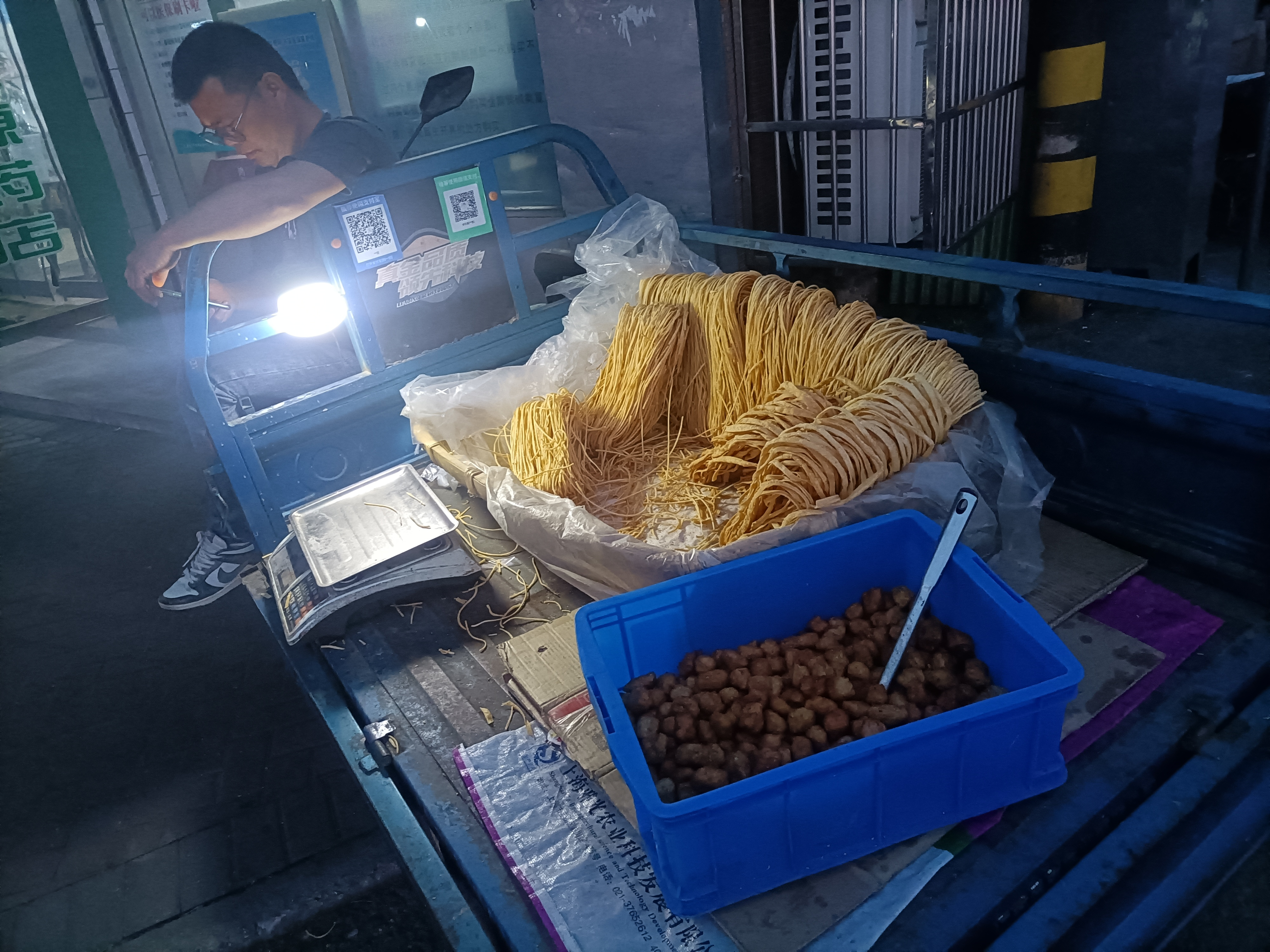
Roadside vendor selling sangza

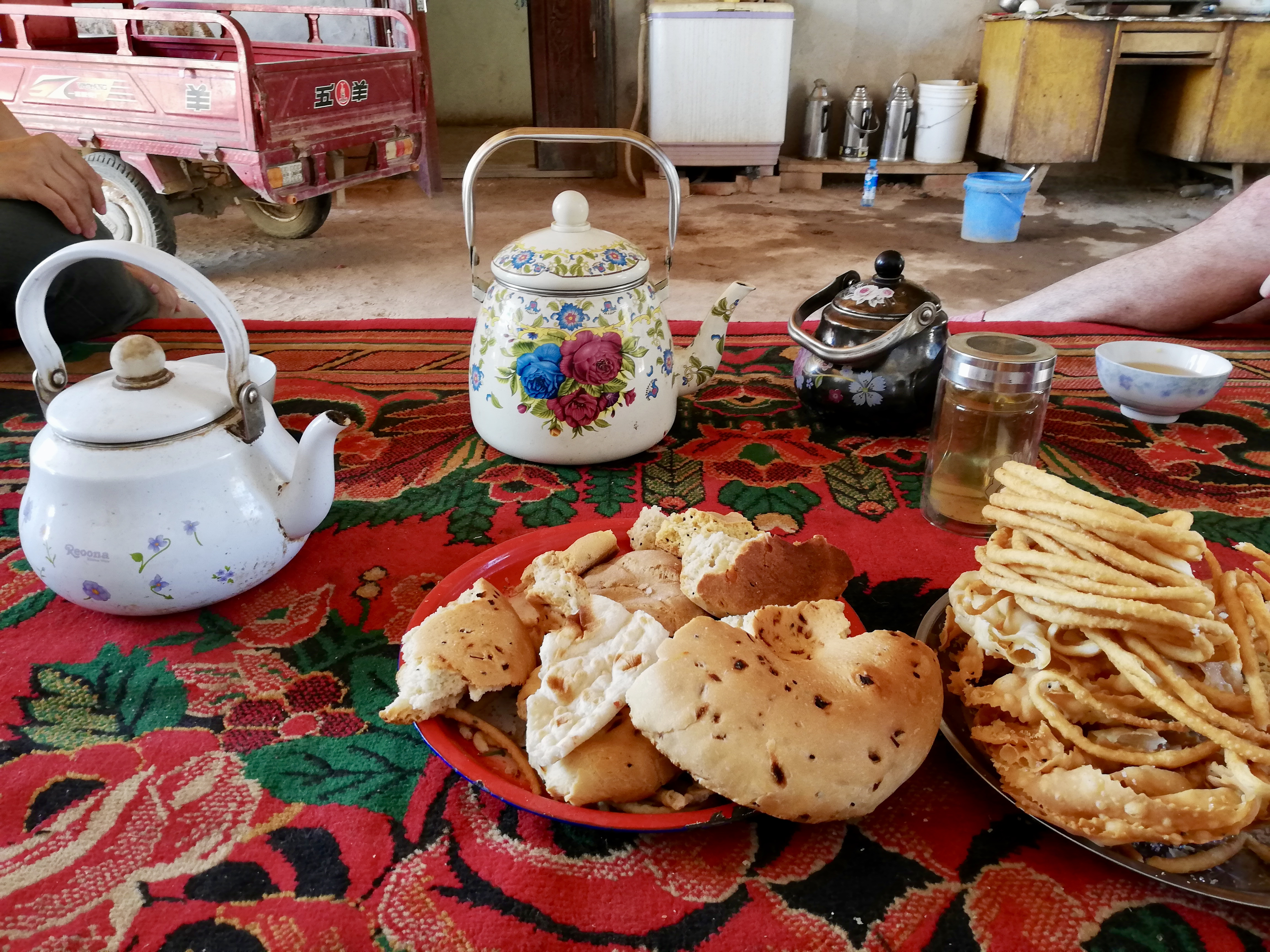
Sangza (bottom right), nan, and tea in Turpan, Xinjiang

== See also ==
- Uyghur cuisine
- Fried noodles
- List of fried dough foods
- Mahua
