= Sheer khurma =

Eid dessert; vermicelli pudding

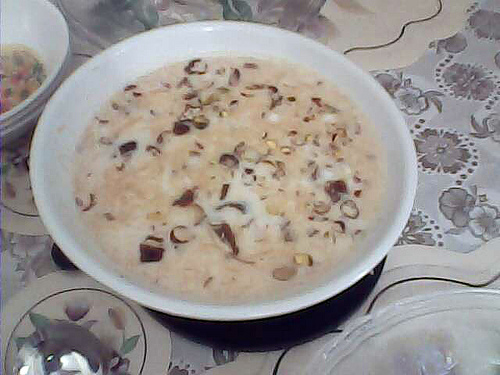
- Place of origin: India, Pakistan, Afghanistan
- Main ingredients: Vermicelli, milk, dates, cashew nuts, cardamom, and ghee or butter

Sheer khurma, sheer khorma, seviyan, or sawine (Persian: شير خرما, romanized: shîr xormâ "milk and dates") is a festival vermicelli pudding prepared by Muslims on Eid ul-Fitr and Eid al-Adha in India, Pakistan, Afghanistan, and parts of Central Asia. It is equivalent to shemai, a Bengali dessert. It is a traditional Muslim festive breakfast, (Note: "Having bathed and dressed in their newest outfits, they sit down to the traditional breakfast of sheer khurma and milk") and a dessert for celebrations. This dish is made from various dry fruits, vermicelli, condensed milk, sugar, and possibly other ingredients. Depending on the region, cardamom, pistachios, almonds, cloves, saffron, raisins, and rose water are also added.

This special dish is served on the morning of Eid day in the family after the Eid prayer as breakfast, and throughout the day to all the visiting guests. In its original form, it consists of dates mixed with milk from Iran and dry fruits and nuts from Afghanistan, and is modified in India by the addition of fried semia and caramelised sugar.

== Ingredients ==
The main ingredients used in sheer khurma are vermicelli, whole milk, sugar, and dates. Depending on the region, cardamom, pistachios, almonds, cloves, saffron, raisins, and rose water are also added.

== Preparation ==
Vermicelli are fried in clarified butter. Then milk (sheer) is added and the vermicelli are allowed to cook further. As the mixture thickens, sugar and dates are added along with any other dried fruits. In some areas locals opt to use a higher milk-to-vermicelli ratio because they prefer a thinner drink-like consistency.

== See also ==
- Afghan cuisine
- Pakistani cuisine
- Indian cuisine
