= Vermicelli =

Type of pasta

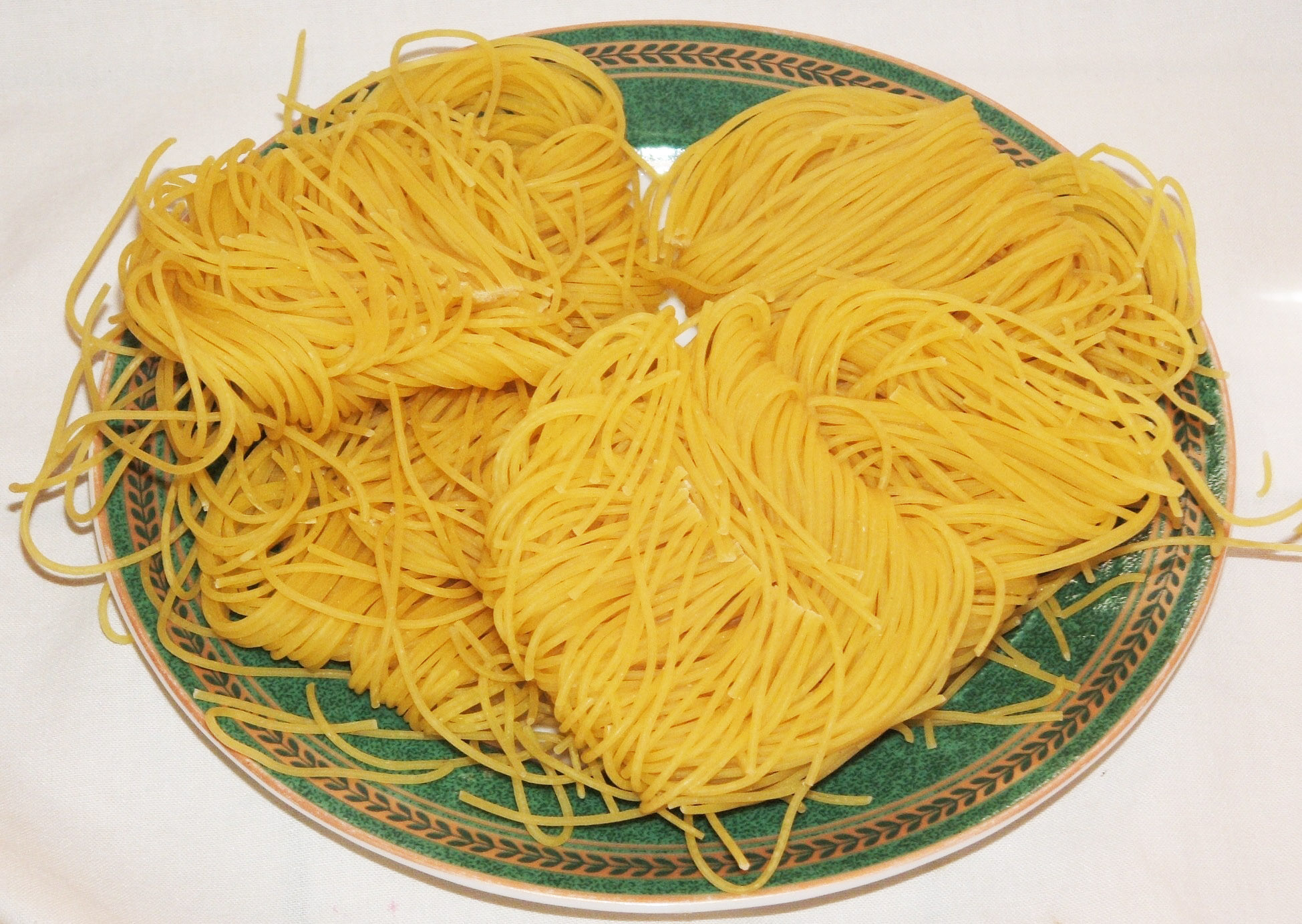
- Type: Pasta
- Place of origin: Italy
- Region or state: Campania

Vermicelli (/ˌvɜːrmɪˈtʃɛli, -ˈsɛli/, UK: /ˌvɛərmɪˈtʃɛli/; Italian: [vermiˈtʃɛlli]) is a type of pasta that is round in section, similar to spaghetti. In English-speaking regions, it is usually thinner than spaghetti, while in Italy it is thicker. It is typically made with semolina.

== Thickness comparison ==
As defined in Italy, the diameters of spaghetti-like pasta are:

vermicelli
between 2.08 and 2.14 millimetres (0.082–0.084 in), with little variation between different producers.
spaghetti
between 1.92 and 2.00 millimetres (0.076–0.079 in).
vermicellini
(lit. 'thin vermicelli') between 1.75 and 1.80 millimetres (0.069–0.071 in).
fedelini
between 1.37 and 1.47 millimetres (0.054–0.058 in).
capellini or capelli d'angelo
(lit. 'little hair' or lit. 'angel's hair') between 0.8 and 0.9 millimetres (0.031–0.035 in).

In the United States, the National Pasta Association (which has no links with its Italian counterpart, the Unione Industriali Pastai Italiani) lists vermicelli as a thinner type of spaghetti.

The Code of Federal Regulations of the United States of America defines spaghetti and vermicelli by diameter:

vermicelli
less than 0.06 inches (1.5 mm).
spaghetti
between 0.06 and 0.11 inches (1.5–2.8 mm).

== Etymology ==
The word vermicelli in English is derived from the Italian vermicello, which is the diminutive of "worm", ultimately from the Latin vermis. According to The Oxford Companion to Food, the term has been in use since the late Middle Ages.

== History ==
Vermicelli-like pasta have likely existed since at least the 13th century in Al-Andalus and North Africa. Arabic texts from Morocco mention Jews in Fez specializing in the trade of fidaws and itriyya, which were types of vermicelli or "at least string-like" pasta.

In 14th-century Italy, long pasta shapes had varying local names. Barnabas de Reatinis of Reggio notes in his Compendium de naturis et proprietatibus alimentorum (1338) that the Tuscan vermicelli are called orati in Bologna, minutelli in Venice, fermentini in Reggio, and pancardelle in Mantua.

The first mention of a vermicelli recipe is in the book De arte Coquinaria per vermicelli e maccaroni siciliani (The Art of Cooking Sicilian Macaroni and Vermicelli), compiled by Martino da Como, unequalled in his field at the time and perhaps the first celebrity chef, who was the chef at the Roman palazzo of the papal chamberlain (camerlengo), the Patriarch of Aquileia. In Martino's Libro de arte coquinaria, there are several recipes for vermicelli, which can last two or three years (doi o tre anni) when dried in the sun.

== Regional varieties ==
=== Arab world ===
In the Arab world, vermicelli is known as sha'riyya or sha'iriyya (Arabic: شعيرية), and it’s toasted in butter and added to rice, often for use in pilafs.

=== Indian subcontinent ===
In the Indian subcontinent, pheni vermicelli is served with milk during the fasting traditions like preparing sargi thali for Karva Chauth or suhur for Ramadan.

== See also ==
- List of pasta
- Rice vermicelli
