= Ganjam Kewda Rooh =

Plant native to India

- Geographical indication
- Alternative names: Kia phula attar White lotus Rooh
- Type: flower
- Area: Ganjam, Odisha
- Country: India
- Material: Flower

Ganjam Kewda Rooh (Screw pine, IPA:/Kia/, Pandanus fascicularis) is a plant native to the Indian state of Odisha primarily in the Ganjam district. Kewda has been identified as a Geographical Indications in India.

They are found between the rivers Rushikulya on the north and Bahuda on the south. It is an economically important species due to its male inflorescence which are used for the fragrant tender white spathes covering the flowers. The perfumery products including Kewda attar, Kewda water and Kewda oil (rooh Kewda) are derived from this plant. The Ganjam district of Odisha supplies about 85–90% of the India's kewda essence. Kewda grows in the 45 km x 15 km coastal belt along the Bay of Bengal.

== Kewda industry in Ganjam ==
The kewda industry in Ganjam provides income of US$4.5–6 million (300–400 million INR) to the local farmers. About 140 traditional distillation units operate in the small scale industries in nearly 200 villages and hamlets of the district producing an estimated 35 million flowers (3,500 tons) worth US$10 million annually.

In Odisha about 200 kilos of Rooh Kewda are prepared each year at a cost of $7000 per kilo as compared to $1500–1800 for a fine attar. The attar contains, on the average about 3–5% essence of Kewda with the rest being sandalwood oil. When Rooh Kewda is being prepared 5 different stills are charged with 600 flowers each. Three distillations are done on one batch of flowers. It means that three receivers are assigned to each deg. The first distillate(Agari) yields 10-12 kilos of aromatic water, the second distillate(Pichari) yields the same. In the third(Tigari) liquid paraffin is sometimes kept to prepare a cheap quality "attar" or only the distillate is kept for making an inexpensive hydrosol. Only the first two distillates(Agari and Pichari) are kept for making the rooh. These are cooled down and in the evening the aromatic water is poured into one deg. It is immediately sealed and the bamboo pipe is connected to the receiver. Very gentle heat is given to the deg and about 5–6 kilos of distillate is collected in the receiver. During this time the receiver must be kept very cool and it is constantly rotated while fresh water is added four to five times. It takes about 1 hour to produce 5–6 kilos of distillate. The receiver is then hung horizontally on a wooden stand. The water is separated and the oil is collected by a special separating funnel. All of the remaining hydrosol is used in making the next batch of ruh which commences on the next day. About a thousand flowers(about 370 lbs) of flowers produces 1 ounce of Rooh Kewda. The Ruh is very very potent. It contains some of the most precious top notes of the oil which cannot even be captured effectively in an absolute.

The fragrant hydrosol produced either as a primary or secondary product has many uses. It is also one of the most important flavoring agents in preparing various food items including syrups, sweets, syrups, and soft drinks."Pandanus water is popular in Northern India and mainly used to flavor the fantastic sweets Indians can prepare from so commonplace ingredients as milk and sugar: rasagola (cottage cheese balls cooked in syrup), Gulab jamun (fried cottage cheese balls served with syrup) and rasmalai (cottage cheese balls in condensed milk); the latter is also sometimes prepared with saffron instead. Another application are the highly aromatic rice dishes the Moghul cuisine is famous for (biriyani, see cardamom).

A genuine kewda ruh, attar, or hydrosol are rare in the local market. The chief constituent of kewda oil is methyl ether of beta-phenylethyl alcohol (60–80%) which gives the characteristic aroma of the flowers. This aromatic component is synthesized on a large scale in India and it is widely used to produce so-called kewda products. This single constituent is readily identifiable by any person with some knowledge of perfumery, but in India, the cheapest product is often which is sold the most. There is not yet a great awareness about the difference between natural and synthetic products. The genuine oil, while containing a high percentage of the above-mentioned component contains a great number of other aromatic molecules which truly give the oil its complete profile. A simple gc/ms will easily detect this adulteration as well as show the complexity of the real oil.
