= Gulab jamun =

Milk-solid-based sweet from the Indian subcontinent

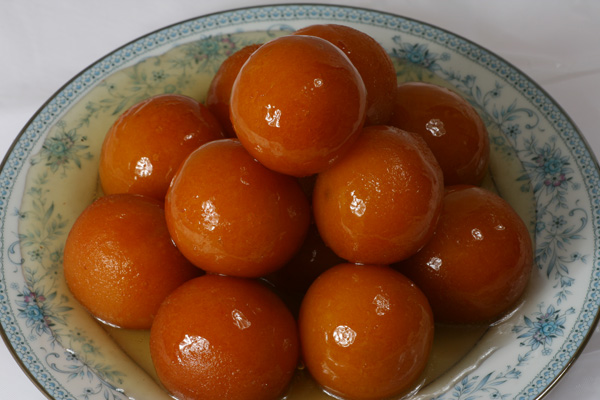
- A bowl of gulab jamuns
- Alternative names: Gulab jaman, lal mohan, gulab jam, gulap jam
- Course: Dessert
- Region or state: Indian subcontinent
- Serving temperature: generally hot
- Main ingredients: Khoa, saffron, maida, sugar
- Variations: Pantua, kalo jam

Gulab jamun is a sweet dessert or mithai which had originated in the Indian subcontinent, and is popular in India, Bangladesh, Nepal, Pakistan and Burmese cuisines. Gulab jamun are also common in nations with substantial populations of South Asians.

Gulab jamuns are made mainly from milk solids (traditionally known as khoa or khoya), which is milk reduced to the consistency of a soft dough. Newer recipes often use dried or powdered milk in place of khoya. Gulab jamuns are often garnished with dried nuts, such as almonds and cashews.

== Preparation ==
Milk and cheese solids are prepared by heating milk over a low flame until the water content has evaporated and only the milk solids, known as khoya, remain. The solids are then kneaded with flour (known in Indian cooking as maida) into small balls of dough. These small balls of dough are then deep-fried in ghee (clarified butter, the more traditional method) or oil at a low temperature. The fried milk dough sweets are then soaked in a light sugar syrup that has been flavored with green cardamom and rose water, kewra or saffron. Warm gulab jamun is sometimes served with kulfi, or with vanilla ice cream.

== Origins ==
The 13th century Arab dessert luqmat al-qadi is similar in appearance to gulab jamun; although it is made of an entirely different batter from gulab jamun, it was decorated with rose petals and soaked in rosewater-scented (gulab) syrup. The only Persian connection may be the common use of rosewater syrup. Gulab Jamun emerged in medieval India during the Mughal Empire, blending Persianate influence with local influences that eventually became gulab jamun. The word "gulab" is derived from the Persian words gul (flower) and āb (water), referring to the rose water-scented syrup; the word "Jamun" or "jaman" is Hindustani for Syzygium jambolanum, an Indian fruit with a similar size and shape, commonly known as Java plum or black plum. Jamun is also defined as a fried delicacy in sugar syrup.

== Special occasions ==
Gulab jamun is often eaten at festivals, birthdays, and major celebrations such as marriages, the Muslim celebrations of Eid ul-Fitr and Eid al-Adha, and the Hindu festivals of Diwali and Ganesh Chaturthi. There are various types of gulab jamun.

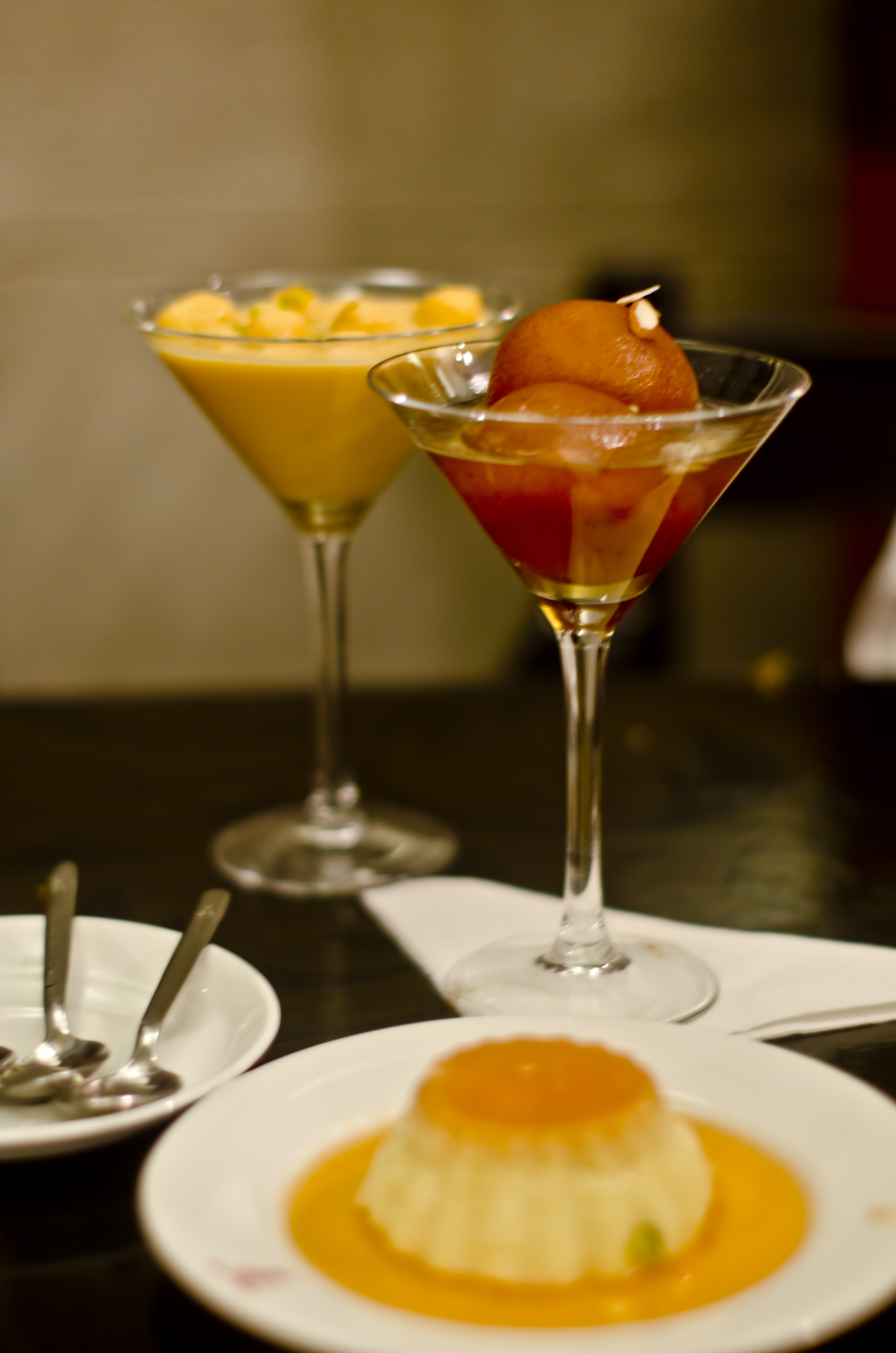
gulab jamun in a glass

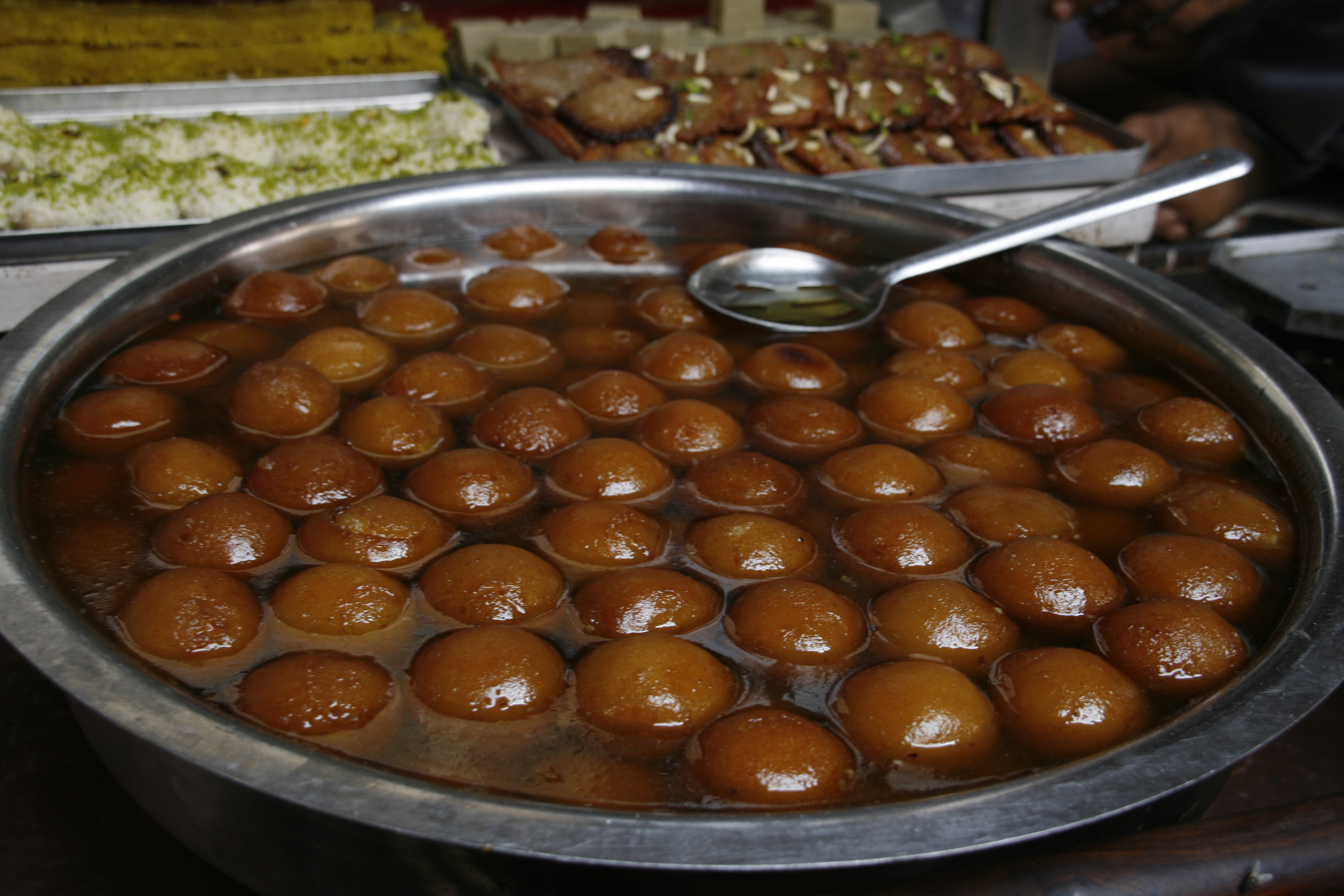
gulab jamun with chashni syrup

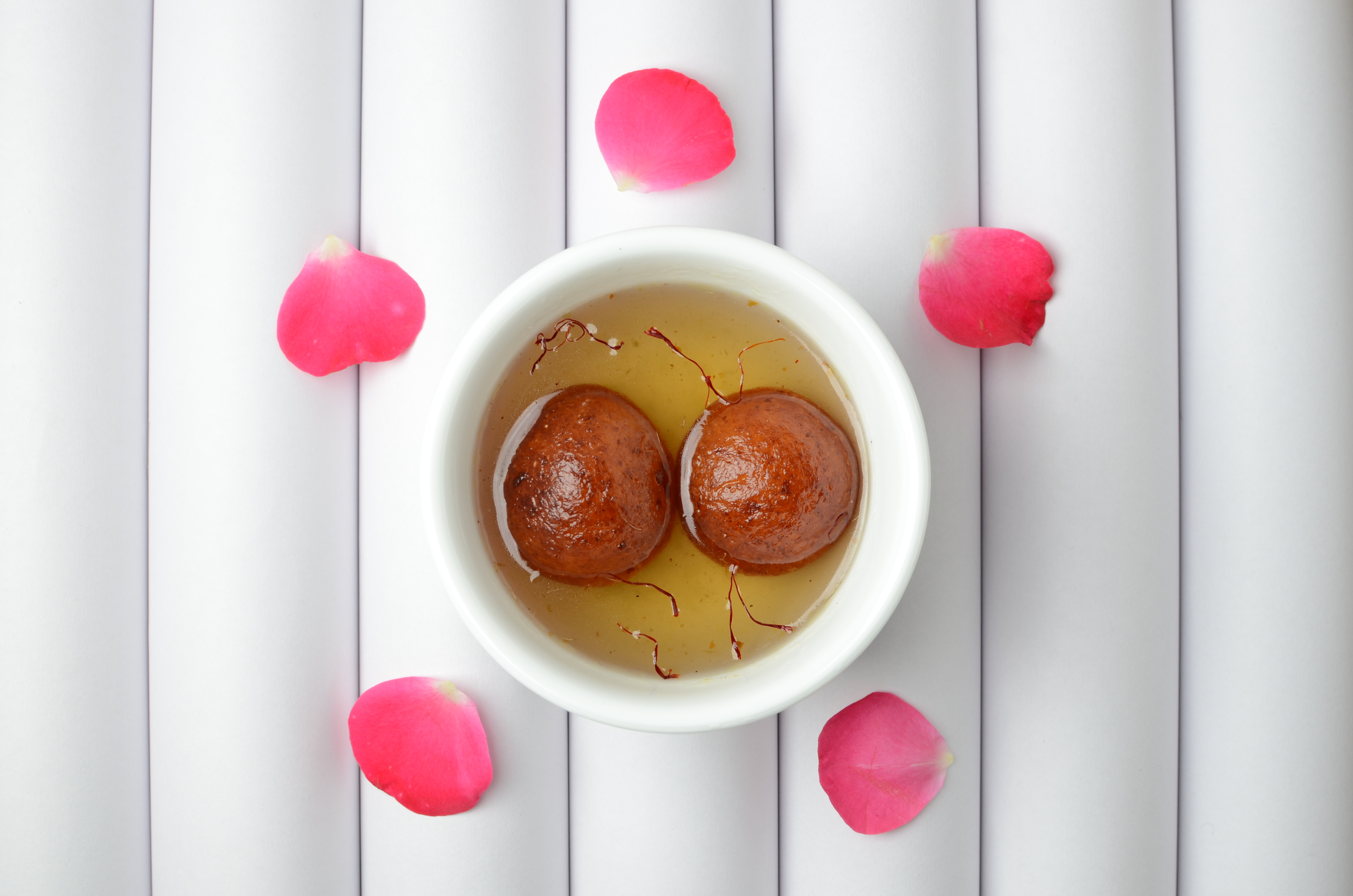
gulab jamun with saffron

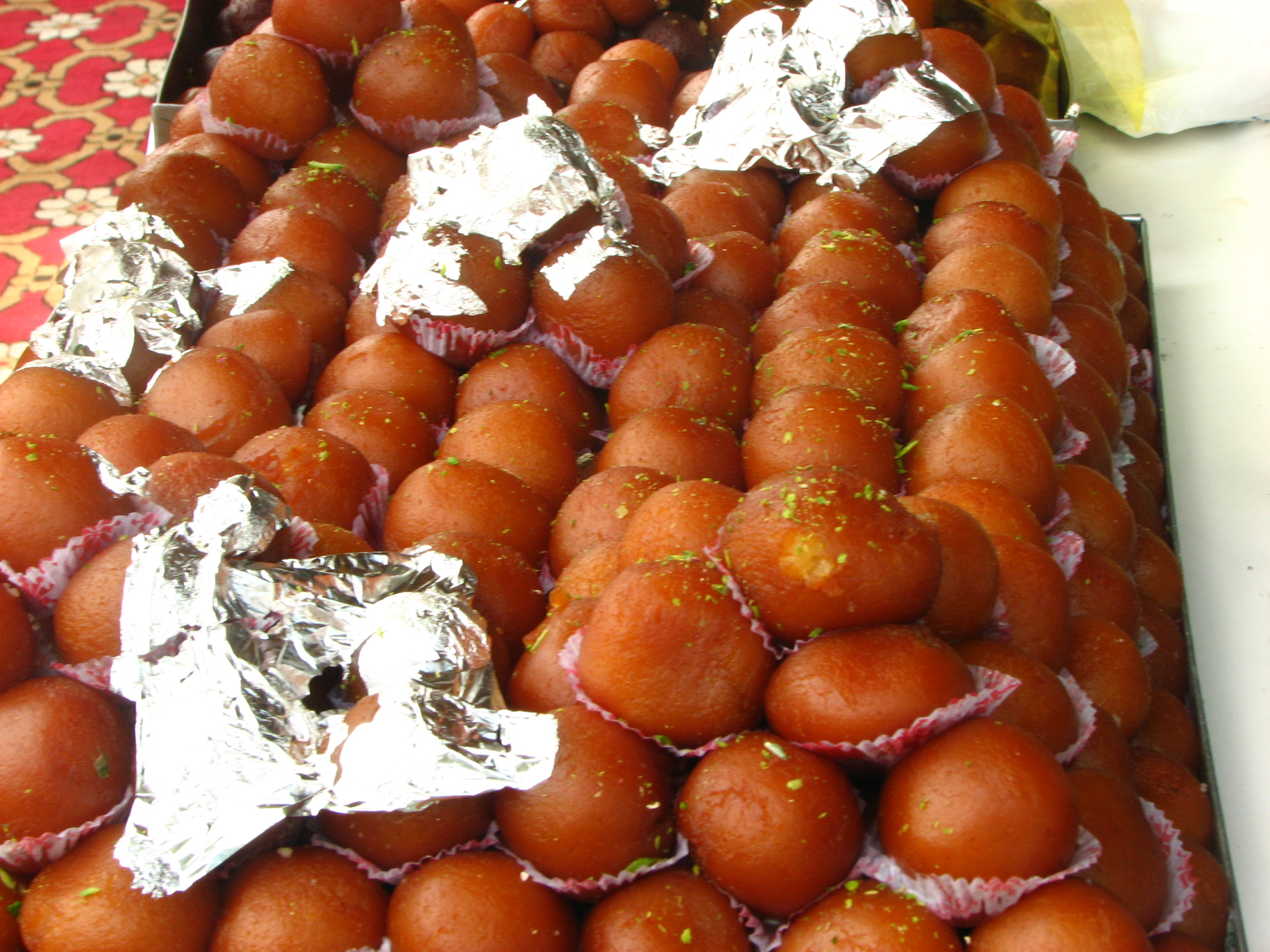
gulab jamun with vark

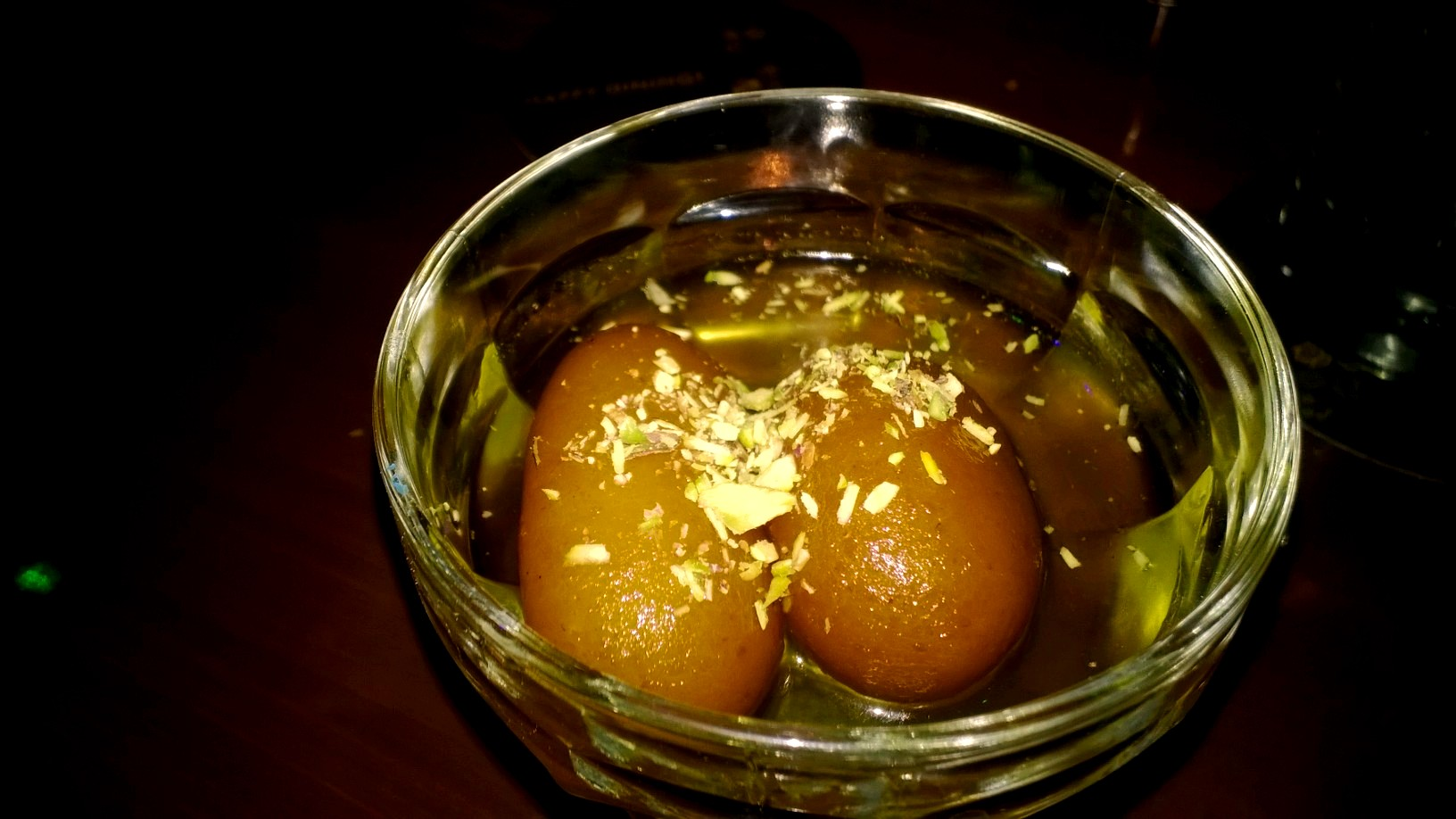
gulab jamuns

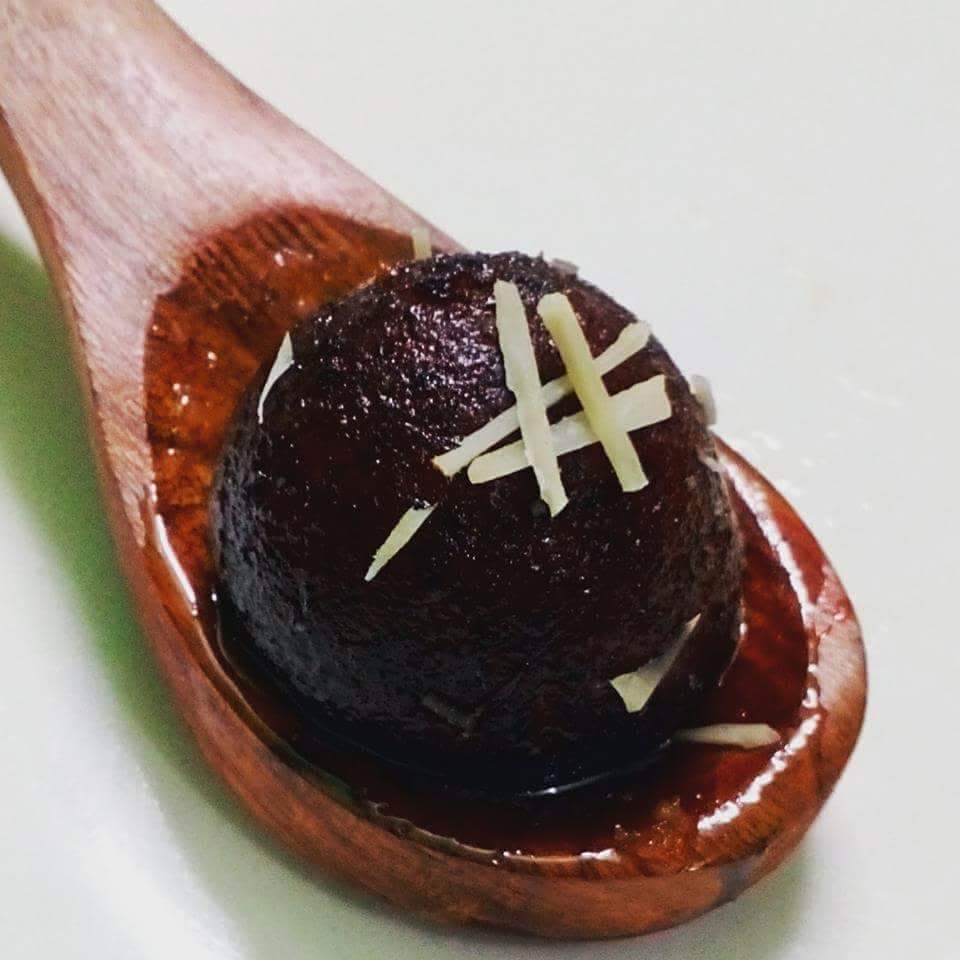
gulab jamun

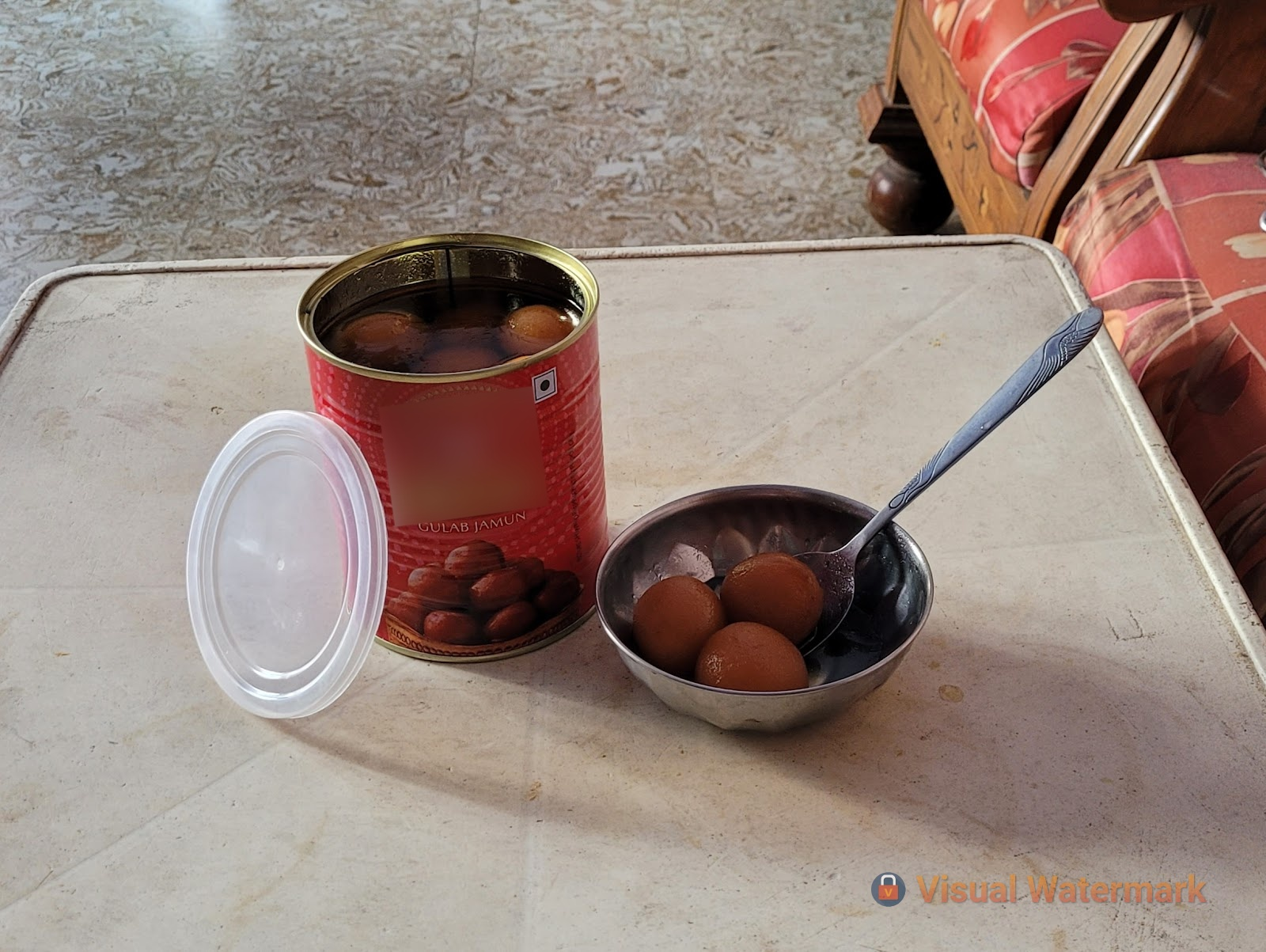
canned gulab jamun

== Variants ==
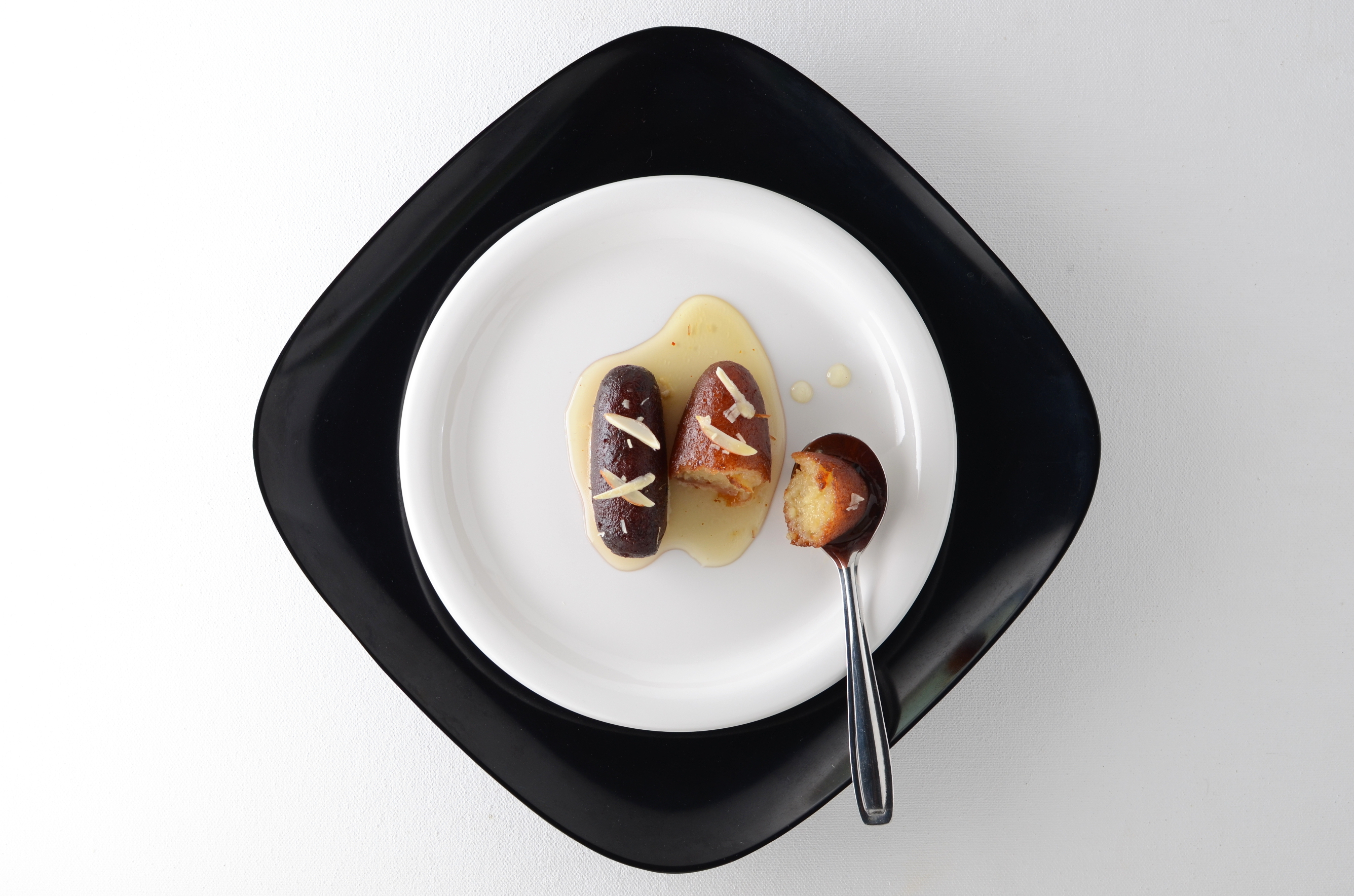
A variant of gulab jamun called kala jamun

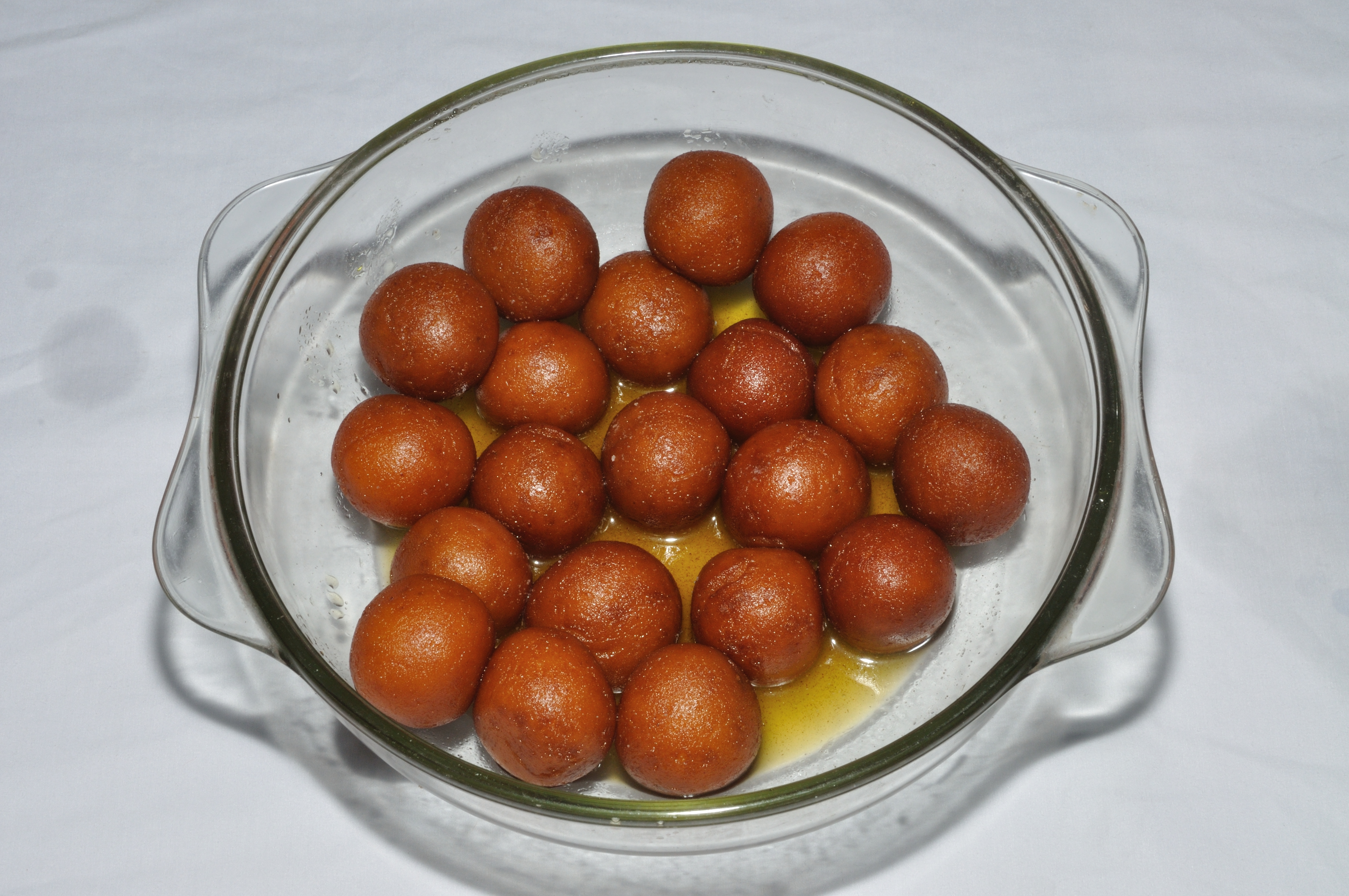
A similar Bengali dish made of chickpea flour, called Pantua.

=== India ===
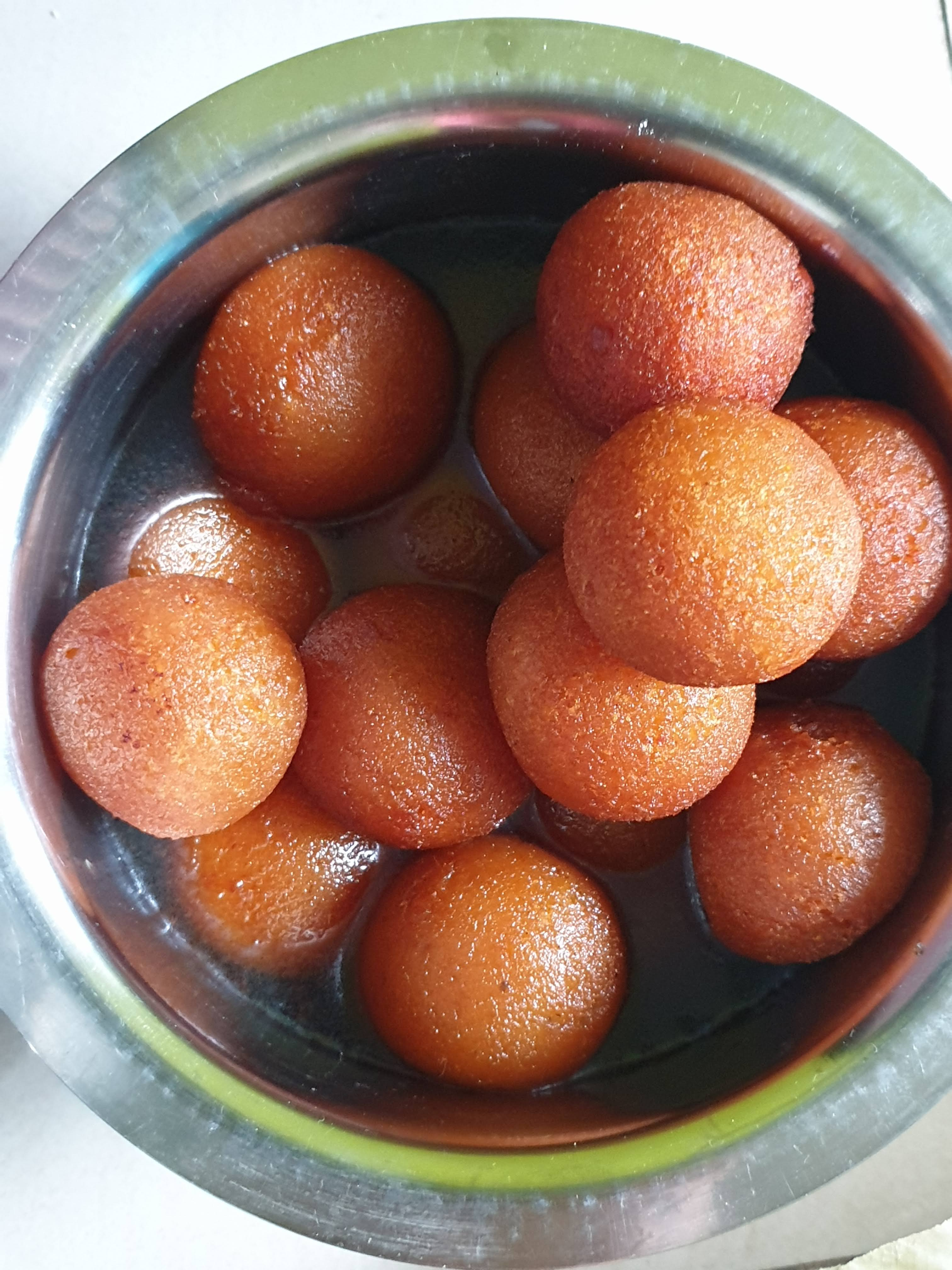
Gulabjamun in Maharashtrian style

Gulab jamun gets its brownish red colour from the sugar content in the milk powder (khoya). In other types of gulab jamun, sugar is added in the batter, and after frying, the sugar caramelization gives it its dark, almost black colour, which is then called kala jamun or "black jamun". Sometimes the sugar syrup may be replaced with a (slightly) diluted maple syrup.

Homemade gulab jamun is usually made up of khoya, a pinch of all-purpose flour/refined wheat flour/ wheat flour (optional), baking powder and clarified butter (ghee). This milk dough is then kneaded to form a dough. The dough is formed into balls; each gulab jamun dough ball requires around a half of a tablespoon to a full tablespoon of dough per gulab jamun. The dough balls are then deep fried. The warm, deep fried milk dough balls are then dropped into simmering sugar syrup. They are then either served immediately, packaged and refrigerated, or are properly jarred (or, more rarely, canned) for shelf-stability for later use.

In Bengali, Gulab Jamun is known as Kalo Jam or Pantua, which is similar to gulab jamun, and could be called a Bengali variant of that dish. Ledikeni, a variation of Pantua, is another variant of gulab jamun. Ledikeni was invented by Bhim Chandra Nag on the occasion of a visit by Lady Canning, the wife of Charles Canning, the Governor-General of India during 1856–62.

Katangi, a town near Jabalpur is famous for "Jhurre Ka Rasgulla", which has been made there for the past 100 years. It is several times the size of normal gulab jamuns and is prepared in local desi ghee.

In Rajasthan, instead of soaking gulab jamun balls in sugar syrup, they are cooked in gravy made from spices, nuts and tomato to make popular Gulab Jamun ki Sabzi.

In Western Madhya Pradesh and Malwa, Mawa Bati is popular as local version of Gulab Jamun. It is different from Gulab jamun by size, fillings and amount of sweetness, Mawa bati is usually not immersed in Sugar syrup and slightly larger than Gulab Jamun.

Arcot, a town near Vellore, is renowned for a local pastry known as Makkan Peda or Arcot Makkan Peda. It was created around the 19th century, inspired by a more ancient recipe of the Carnatic nawabs. Its name suggests a link with another sweet, the peda, but its making and appearance make it like gulab jamun, of which it is distinctive due to its filling with dry fruits or nuts. Kumbakonam is another city in Tamil Nadu reputed for its dry gulab jamuns. Coated with icing sugar and shredded coconut, these jamuns are more like pedas.

=== Bangladesh ===
In Bangladesh, Pantua is available almost everywhere throughout the country, which can be referred to a Bengali variation of Gulab jamun. Also there are two kinds of jamuns that are famous. They are Golap Jam (গোলাপ জাম) and Kalo Jam (কালো জাম).

=== Nepal ===
The sweet is known as Lal Mohan (लालमोहन) in Nepali language and is available at almost every sweet shop. The sale of the sweet usually increases significantly during festivals such as Tihar and Dashain.

== See also ==
- Bamiyeh
- Chak-Chak
- Chè xôi nước
- Doughnut holes
- Leche frita
- List of desserts
- Lokma
- Lyangcha
- Puff-puff
- Rasgulla
- Struffoli
- Tangyuan
