= Ganjam Kewda Flower =

Male flower of the fragrant screwpine plant

- Geographical indication
- Alternative names: Kia, Ketaki, White lotus
- Type: flower
- Area: Ganjam, Odisha
- Country: India
- Material: Flower

Ganjam Kewda is a male flower of the fragrant screwpine plant used for extracting kewda oil in India. A native to the tropics, it is registered (on Application No. 229) under the Geographical Indications (GI) of Goods (Registration and Protection) Act by Government of India. Kewda scent is produced in Chhatrapur, Brahmapur, Gopalpur and Jagannathpur in district of Ganjam, Odisha. Although kewda plants can be found through most of India, 90% of the commercial production of the kewda flower is estimated to occur in the Odisha state.

The flower of the kewda plant grows on a small tree or shrub; it is both cultivated and grows wild in coastal areas. The plant can also be found in some inland districts but the flowers seem to create their most exquisite floral bouquet in certain coastal localities, the most famous being the Ganjam district of Odisha. The tree can reach a height of 18 feet, with dense branches supported by aerial roots that can form a thick, almost impenetrable jungle. The long leaves possess prickly spines along the edges and mid-ribs making the plant tough to handle for those not familiar with the handling and harvesting techniques. The male flower "spikes" (or inflorescence) are 25–50 cm (10–20 in) long. Along the central stalk of each spike one can find many flowers, each encased in a fragrant cream-colored spathe (a spathe is a protective leaf enclosing a flower). A fully mature kewda tree produces about 30 to 40 flower spikes each year weighing 5 to 6 each ounces each.

== Usage ==
Kewra is used to flavor foods and for Ayurveda healing. The kewra plant grows wild along the east coast of India. The plants that create the best floral bouquet are grown in Ganjam district of South Odisha. Rampe plant (Pandanus amaryllifolius Roxb) is different from Kewra plant. The fragrant leaves of Rampe plant (Pandan Patta) are used to flavor rice and curries.

== Types ==
Kewra plant is dioecious, with male and female flowers produced on different plants. In Sanskrit, the plant is called Ketaki. The male plants are called 'Ketaki Viphala', and the female plants are called 'Swarana Ketaki'.

=== The male plant - flower ===
Only the flowers of the male plant are harvested to extract the floral bouquet to produce kewra. The flower's bouquet is sweet, similar to rose flowers, with also some fruity notes. The plants flower three times a year (summer, monsoon season, and autumn). A majority of the flowers that provide the best floral bouquet grow during monsoon season (July–September). Some 30% of the flowers grow during summer (May–June), and the remaining 10% grow during autumn (October–November). The creamy white color flowers are encased in long spikes about one foot long. On average, one mature plant can produce about 35 flower spikes, each weighing about 5 to 6 ounces.

=== The female plant - flower ===
The flower of female plant has no floral bouquet. It is left to develop into fruit.

== Kewra Flower's extracts ==
The kewda flowers extracts sold in the market are:

=== Kewra Ruh (Oil) ===
This is 100% pure oil extracted from male kewra flowers. It takes about 1,000 flowers (370 pounds) to produce one ounce of Kewra Ruh. In Ayurveda, the oil is used as a stimulant, and to treat rheumatoid arthritis and this oil current rate is Rs- 15,50,000 of one litre

=== Kewra Attar (Perfume) ===
The Kewra flowers are distillated into sandalwood oil. Kewra Attar has about 3% to 5% Kewra oil, and the remainder is Sandalwood oil. Normally, it is specified in terms of number of flower spikes (10,000 to 15,000) per pound of sandalwood oil, This is the most popular perfume used in India. It is applied behind ears, and used to scent clothes. The perfume is also added to various cosmetics.

=== Kewra Jal (Hydrosol) ===
The fragrant hydrosol (distillate of an essential oil) may be either a primary product from low quality flowers collected during hot summer, or it may be a secondary product from Kewra Ruh or Attar production. Kewra Jal is also called Kewra water. Kewra Jal is about 0.02% of Kewra oil. 24 flowers can produce one pound of primary hydrosol. The hydrosol is used to flavor popular sweets such as Rasgulla, Rasmalai, and Ghulab Jamun. It is used to flavor rice dishes such as biryanis.

== Kewda Industry in Ganjam ==
The kewda flower and its rhu, produced after processing the flowers, is also unique to the region. The flower grows in at least four coastal blocks of the district - Chhatrapur, Rangeilunda, Ganjam and Chikiti. The Kewda oil is extracted by processing the flowers in distilleries. Around 250 processing units, locally known as bhatis, were engaged in processing the flowers.

Apart from its use in the perfume industry, the oil of the thorny flower is used in preparing gutka (a stimulant that causes mouth cancer). After the ban on manufacture and sale of gutka in several states, including Odisha, most of the processing units have stopped operations.
