= Manasollasa =

12th-century Sanskrit encyclopedic work

The Mānasollāsa (मानसोल्लास ) also known as Abhilashitartha Chintamani (अभिलाषितार्थ चिन्तामणि), is an early 12th-century Sanskrit text composed by the Kalyani Chalukya king Someshvara III, who ruled in present-day Karnataka. It is an encyclopedic work covering topics such as polity, governance, ethics, economics, astronomy, astrology, rhetoric, veterinary medicine, horticulture, perfumes, food, architecture, games, painting, poetry, dance and music. The text is a valuable source of socio-cultural information on 11th and 12th century India.

The encyclopedic treatise is structured as five sub-books with a cumulative total of 100 chapters. It is notable for its extensive discussion of arts, particularly music and dance. It is also notable for including chapters on food recipes and festivals, many of which are a part of modern Indian culture.

Another medieval era Sanskrit text with the title Mānasollāsa also exists, consisting of devotional praise hymns (stōtra), and it is different from the encyclopedic treatise.

== Nomenclature ==
12th century fish recipe

Cut fishes into pieces and wash them well.
Cook along with malabar tamarind juice.
Sprinkle well with wheat flour. Fry in heated oil till brown.
Add rock salt. Sprinkle powdered cardamom and pepper.

— Manasollasa 3.1530–1531

The title Manasollasa (मानसोल्लास) is a compound Sanskrit word, consisting of manas (मनस्) or "mind" and ullasa (उल्लास) or "rejoicing, delighting". It means "the joy, delighter or entertainer of the mind". Alternatively, the compound word can be broken as manasa and ullasa, which mean "happiness of mind".

The work is divided into five sub-books suffixed as Viṁśati (विंशति) which means 20 and refers to the 20 chapters in the sub-book. In modern scholarship, it is referred by IAST spellings "Manasollāsa", and "Mānasollāsa".

It is also known as the Abhilashitartha Chintamani (Abhilaṣitārtha Cintāmaṇi) (literally, the precious gem that fulfills wish). This text title is spelled Manasollāsa, and there is another medieval era Indian text with the title, Mānasollāsa (Sanskrit: मानसोल्लास), written in Stotra (poetry of praise) style related to Dakshinamūrti, very different in scope and attributed to Ādi Shankara or Suresvara.

== Date and author ==
The text was completed in 1129 CE by Someshvara III. He became the king in 1127, was part of the Kalyani Chalukya dynasty, and the third king in this dynasty. The year in which he ascended the throne is approximate, and some scholars state it to be 1125 CE. The author hailed from the medieval Deccan region consisting of large parts of modern Karnataka, Telangana, western Andhra Pradesh and southern Maharashtra.

== Structure ==
Veterinary care for Elephants

All those diseases of elephants caused by Vata and Pitta are cured without fail, by a mixture of Guduchi, two types of Parnika, two types of Meda, Jivaka and Rishabha, two types of Kakoli , Ashvagandha, Vidari and Shatavari, either in powder, paste, or decoction form.

— Manasollasa 2.649–650

The Manasollasa is an encyclopedic treatise written in poetic verse style.

It is structured into five sub-books and cumulatively contains 100 chapters. The five Vinshatis (sub-book of 20s) are Rājyaprāptikāraṇa, Rājyasya Sthairyakāraṇa, Bhartur Upabhogakāraṇa, Pramoda kāraṇa and the Krīḍā viṁśati. Each chapter deals with a specific topic, ranging from gaining a kingdom, its governance, economics, infrastructure, architecture, medicine, cuisine, ornaments, perfumery and love-games, sports, jewelry, painting, music and dance. A major part of the text is dedicated to music and musical instruments, with 2500 verses dedicated to it.

The number of ślokas in this work are:

Twenty-book (Viṁśati)	Chapters (Adhyāya)	Verses (Śloka)
I. Rājyaprāptikāraṇa	20	308
II. Rājyasya Sthairyakāraṇa	20	1300
III. Bhartur Upabhogakāraṇa	20	1820
IV. Pramoda kāraṇa	20	3219
V. Krīḍā viṁśati	20	1375

== Contents ==
=== Kingdom and qualifications of a king: Rājyaprāptikāraṇa ===
The Rajyapraptikarana sub-book describes the qualifications of a king and ministers, their duties and moral characteristics that enable the king to rule a stable, prosperous kingdom.

The chapter asserts that the king should be truthful, avoid anger, be virtuous and lead by example. The king, ministers and citizens should, states the Manasollasa's first sub-book, refrain from injury to others, practice self-restraint and generosity, have faith in gods, feed and support the poor and helpless, and be friendly. The king, according to the text, should honour his ancestors and all guests.

=== Governance, economics and political stability: Rājyasya Sthairyakāraṇa ===
The second sub-book Rajyasya Sthairyakaraṇa Vimshati is dedicated to governance and economic matters to help a king retain the kingdom. It describes the ministers and their qualifications, the maintenance, equipment and training of an army with a Senapati (general) to command the army, the priests and astrologer as advisors to the king, the treasury and methods of taxation.

J Duncan M Derrett, a professor of Oriental Laws, states that chapter 2.8 of the text discusses three kinds of constitutions and recommends that the king should delegate large responsibilities to his ministers, a system that implied that the kingdom was virtually ruled through the ministers. The Manasollasa gives a significant role to an astrologer in the council of advisors to the king who would forecast the auspicious time to respond to an attack, which Hartmut Scharfe, a professor of Indo-European Studies, states proved disastrous during foreign Muslim invasion of the Deccan peninsula.

The delegated form of governance in the existing or acquired provinces is recommended by the text, with the qualification that the province should be ruled by someone born there. However, all ministers in immediate vicinity of the king must be born in the long established state. The king, states the text, must watch out and act against bureaucrats and officials who torment his subjects. The text cautions that the king should prevent abuse of his subjects from officials, robbers, enemies, king's favorites and his own greed.

This sub-book also describes types of shulka (taxation). In the fourth chapter, it explains the tax collected at port of entry on goods that arrive at the border.

The second sub-book includes chapters on veterinary care of animals such as horses and elephants who served the army. Many veterinary ailments are described, ranging from fever to injury to stomach upsets, and the proper nourishment, care of the animals as well as formulations of medicines are outlined in the verses of chapter 2.6, for example. The text includes the names of over 40 herbs used for recipes of veterinary care.

=== Food and entertainment: Bhartur Upabhogakāraṇa ===
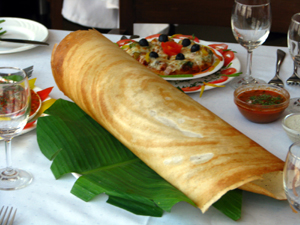
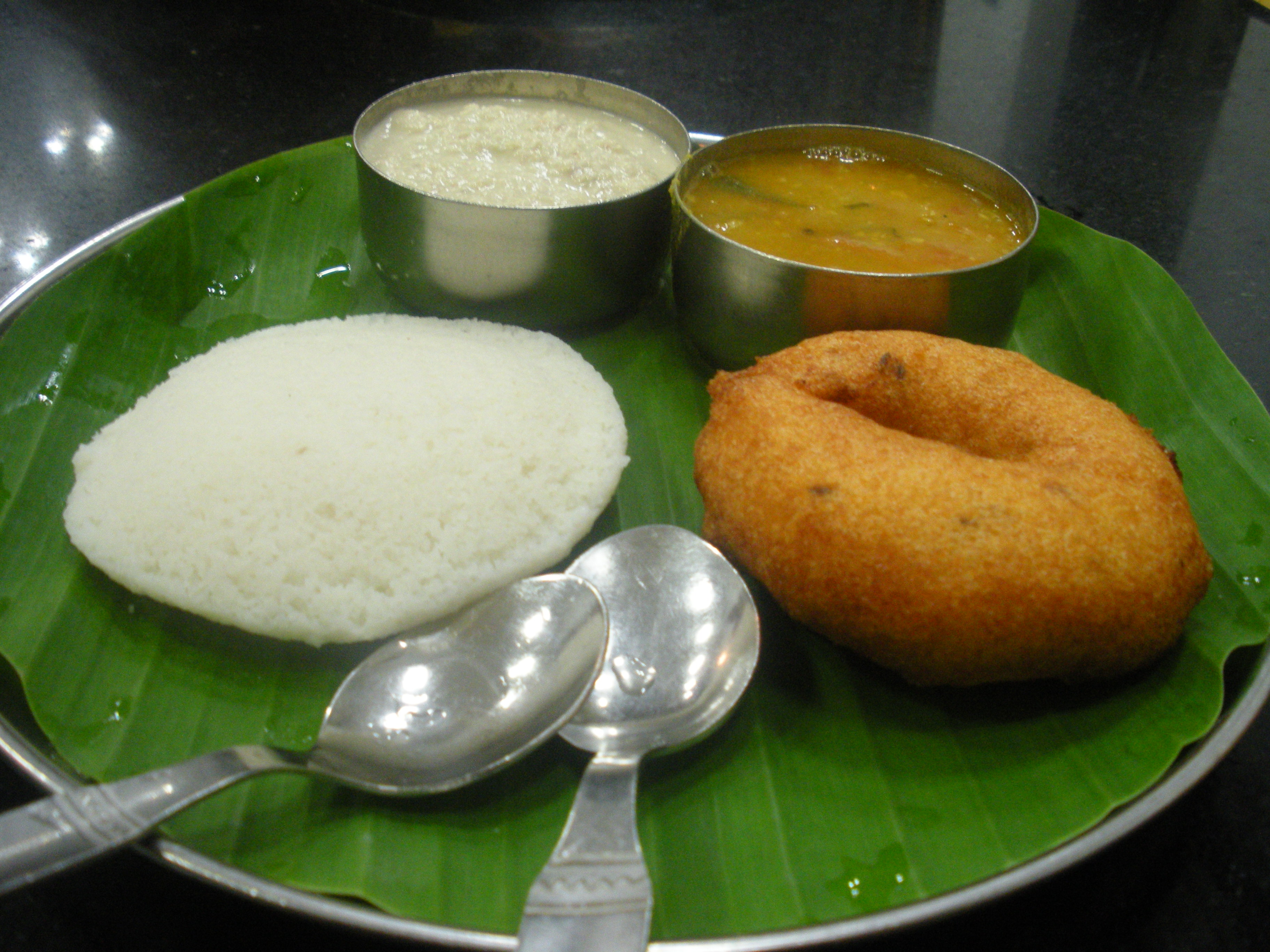
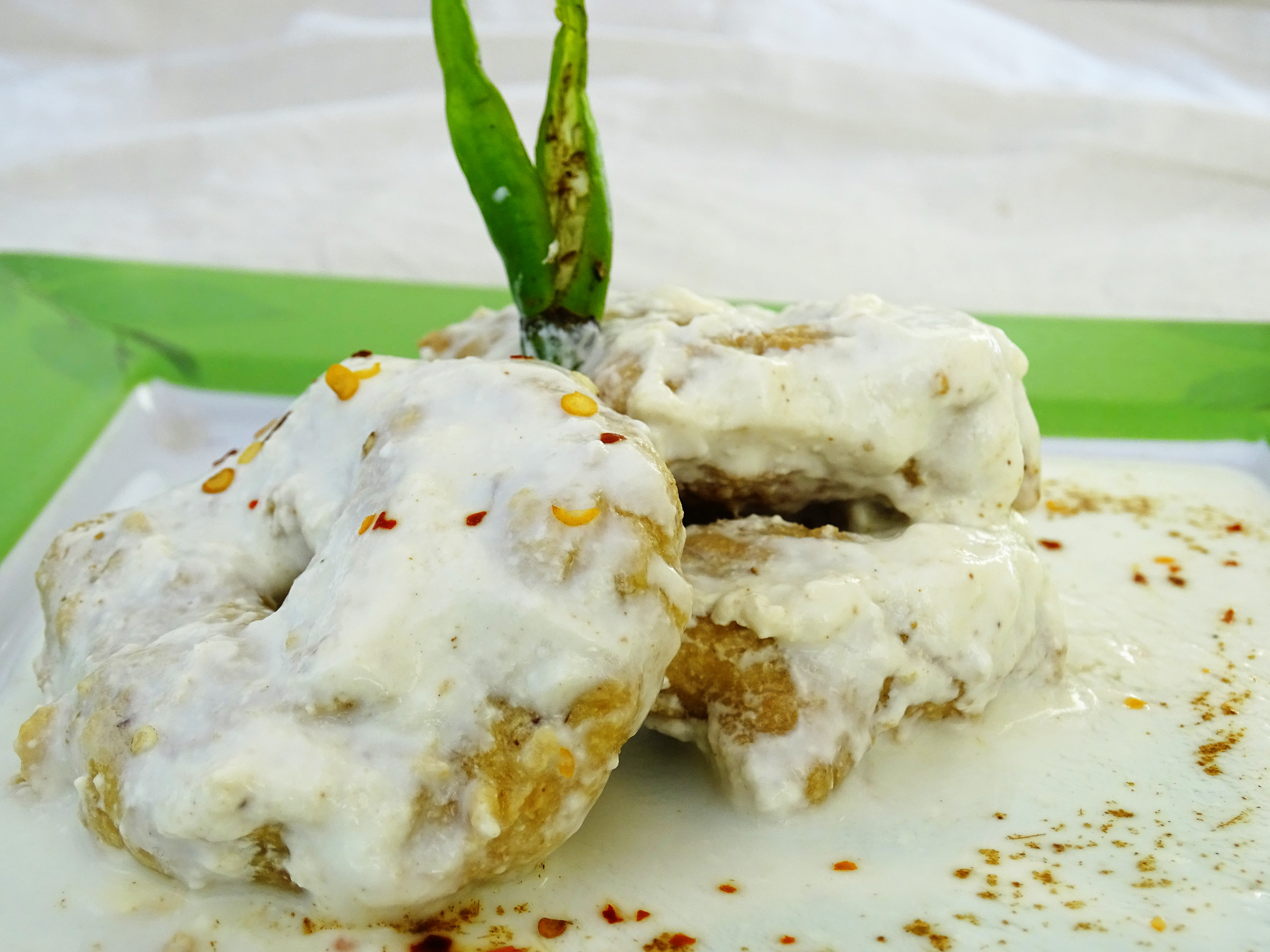
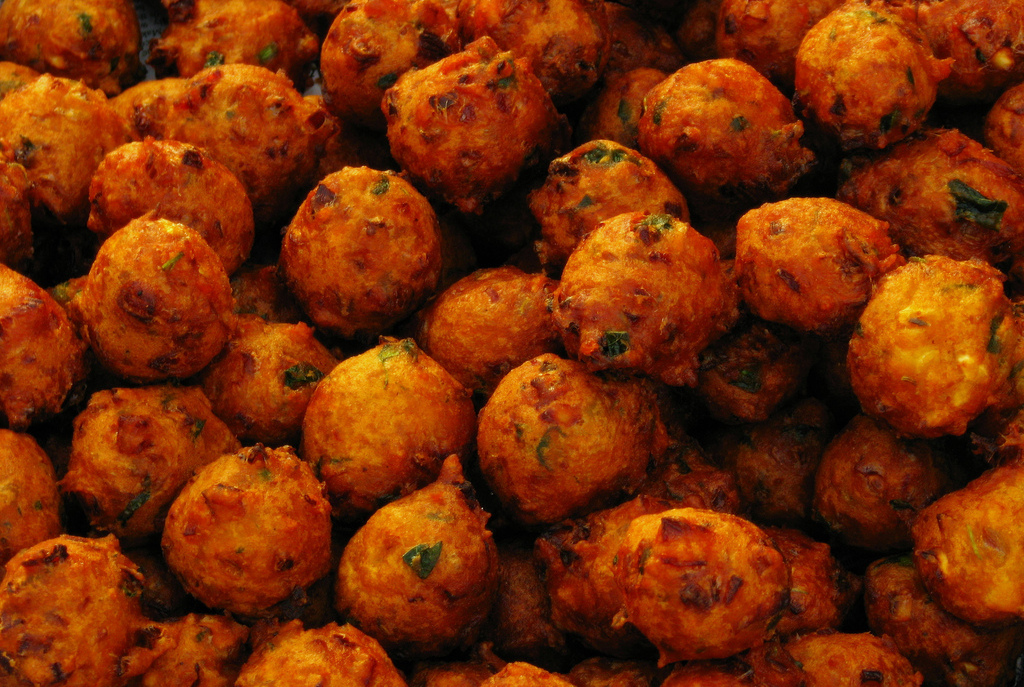
The 12th-century text describes foods that continue to be part of modern Indian tradition. Above clockwise from top left in Sanskrit: Dosaka (Dosa), Iddarika and Vataka (Idli and vada), Parika (Pakora) and Kshiravata (Dahi vada).

The Manasollasa contains recipes of vegetarian and non-vegetarian cuisines, which according to Mary Ellen Snodgrass, the editor of Encyclopedia of Kitchen History, preceded the cookbook writing history in Europe by a century. While the text is not the first among Indian books to describe fermented foods, it contains a range of cuisines based on fermentation of cereals and flours. Among meat dishes, the text does not include the meat of cow, horse, elephant, parrot, peacock or eggs. It describes cuisines based on pork, venison, goat meat, and fish among others.

The text asserts that fresh water is Amrita (nectar) of cuisine, and Visha (poison) otherwise. Someshvara III recommends fresh water from rains (autumn), springs (summer), rivers and lakes (winter) for daily use, after it has been filtered with a clean cloth. The text recommends boiling the water before use and using the water so in a day. For drinking, if boiling is not possible, the text recommends alternate purification method based on Triphala, and then adding a piece of mango, patala or champaka flower or powder of camphor for flavor and delight. The text mentions fresh coconut water and a drink called panakam.

The art of preparing wine is described in Manasollasa from grape and sugarcane, with unusual sources being based on brewing of Talimadya (palm), Narikelasava (coconut) and Khajurasava (date).

It includes recipes for the king's favorite sweets. In addition to milk based sweets it includes recipes for fried sweets like golamu (a doughnut made with wheat flour), a rice flour based sweet similar to the modern pantua and ledikeni, and gharika (fried cakes made of black gram flour).

=== Joy and delight: Pramoda kāraṇa ===
The fourth sub-book of Manasollasa deals with entertainment such as music, dance, songs and competitive sports. The text covers dance and music in exclusive chapters, dedicating far more verses to these two topics than first two sub-books combined. This may reflect the importance of performance arts in 12th-century India, since Someshvara III's son and successor to the throne king Jagadekamalla II also wrote a famed treatise Sangita-chūdamani, literally "crown jewel of music".

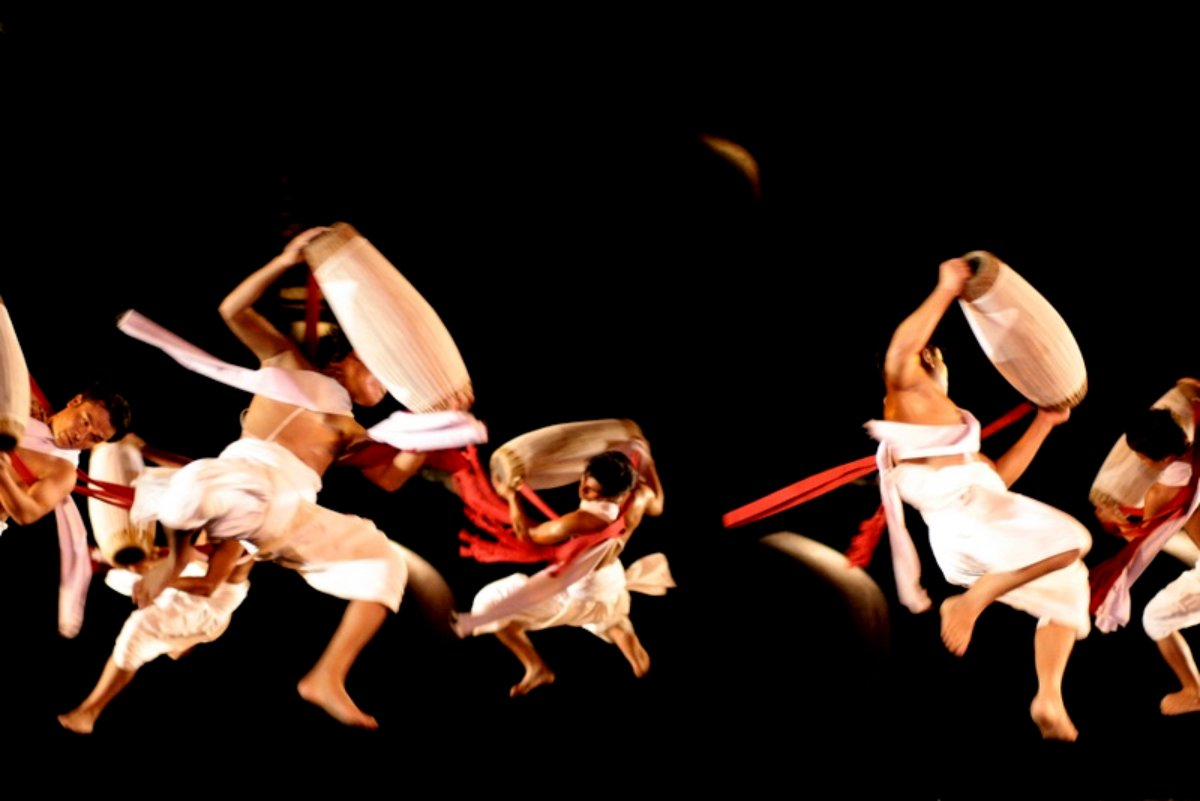
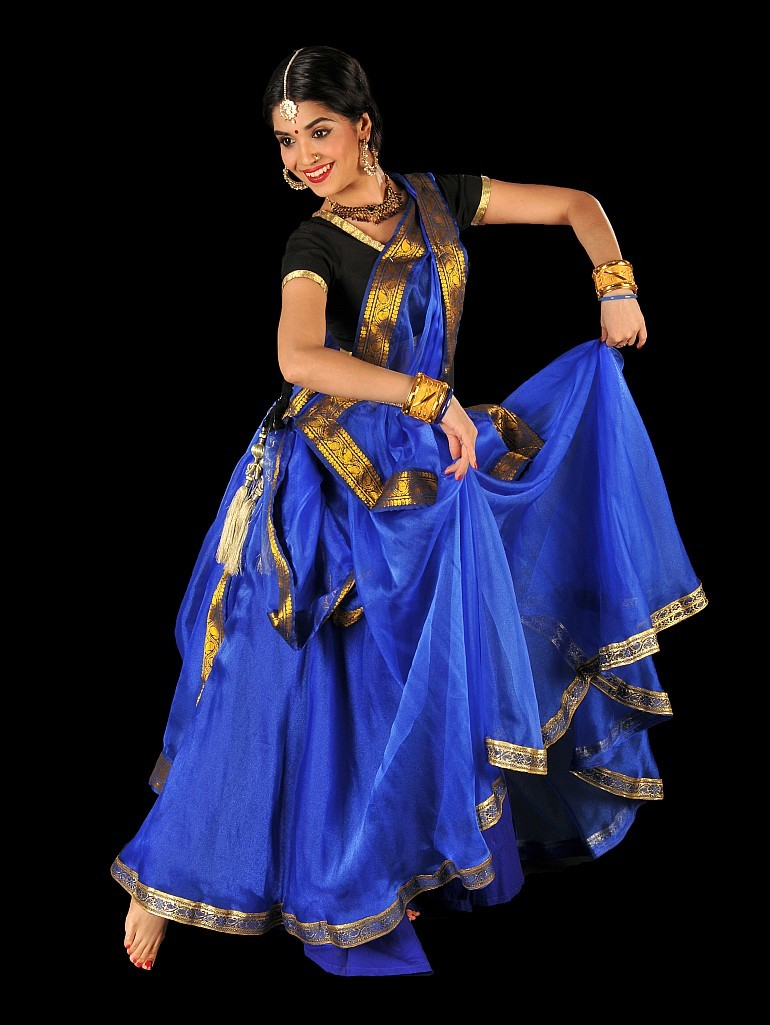
The text discusses many dance forms, including Tandava or the vigorous style (left) and Lasya or the delicate style (right) of Kathak.

The text describes types of songs and music, instruments and dances along with occasions of their performance. The Tripadi, states the text in chapter 4.16, was performed during harvesting and husking season, the Shatpadi was performed by folk story tellers, the Dhavala sung at marriages, while festivals such as Holi were celebrated with Mangala and Caccari genre of songs and music. The Charya, asserts the text, were songs of meditation. The text claims Gana (गान) to be a form of "popular music" and that Geet that is neither fast nor slow, but contains both high and low notes, where the words and musical meter are equally important to be preferred by spiritual teachers.

Rhetoric is discussed in chapter 4.17 of Manasollasa. The text dedicates over 450 verses in chapter 4.18 to dance and describes types of dance forms, musical instruments that go with dance performances, and the occasions when dances were celebrated. The text discusses six types of performers, their characteristics and their roles — Nata (actor), Nartaka (dancer), Nartaki (danseuse), Vaitalika (bard), Charana (wandering performer) and Kollatika (acrobat). Their body movements (6 Anga, 8 Upanga and 6 Pratyanga) are explained with their significance. This discussion is similar to that found in Natya Shastra, a Sanskrit text composed around 1st-century BCE. The text thereafter presents the 21 Sthanas and 26 Charis of the dance tradition.

The discussion on dance movements is compiled by six categories — mimetic (natya), delicate (lasya), vigorous (tandava), acrobatic (visama), ludicrous (vikata) and graceful (laghu).

The fourth sub-book also describes sports, such as fishing, dog (greyhound-type) racing, horse racing, elephant racing as well as archery, wrestling and athletics. The text describes some unique team sports, such as a form of Indian polo involving two teams of eight members each.

=== Games, arts and leisure: Krīḍā viṁśati ===
The last sub-book of the text discusses recreation through horticulture and the art of creating gardens, painting, perfumery, architecture and the training and breeding of horses, elephants, lavakki (a type of quail), and other wildlife. A chapter is devoted to the royal sport of hunting deer or other wild game. It deals with 35 ways of game hunting of deer, in addition to hunting with dogs, falconry and fishing.

The garden design, asserts the text, should include rocks and raised mounds of summits, manicured with plants and trees of diverse varieties, artificial ponds and flowing brooks. It describes the arrangement, the soils, the seeds, the distance between types of plants and trees, the methods of preparing manure, proper fertilizing and maintaining the garden, which plants and trees are best planted first, when to plant others, watering, signs of overwatering and underwatering, weeds, means of protecting the garden and other details. Both public parks and woodland gardens are described, with about 40 types of trees recommended for the park in the Vana-krida chapter.

Other arts and leisure activities described in the fifth sub-book include activities such as garland making and perfumery, wherein the flowers are arranged in patterns of pleasing colors and ones that delight the senses. The text lists types of aromatic woods, such as sandalwood and their qualities. The text describes the art of painting as three types — Viddha (representational), Aviddha (sketch, outline) and Bhava (narrative). The text includes a recipe for making various types of paints, as well as crayons for drawing, and then recommends the steps in making a drawing.

The 12th-century text describes jewelry and make up of women including those applied to their eyelids, lashes, cheeks and forearms, mentioning styles and colors of Tilak on their foreheads. In jewelry, those for hair and earrings are notable.

== Legacy ==
The Manasollasa has been called an important source on socio-cultural history of medieval India, particularly for the history of food, drinks and cuisines and of sports. Mandakranta Bose, a professor on South Asian studies, describes the text to be of great interest because it is the earliest known text with details on dance genres in India. A team consisting of Bruno Nettl, a professor of music and anthropology, has called Manasollasa an enormous treatise with large sections on music, dance and other performance arts.

== See also ==
- Sushruta Samhita
- Charaka Samhita
- Culture of India
- Indian cookbooks
