= Pantua =

Bengali sweet

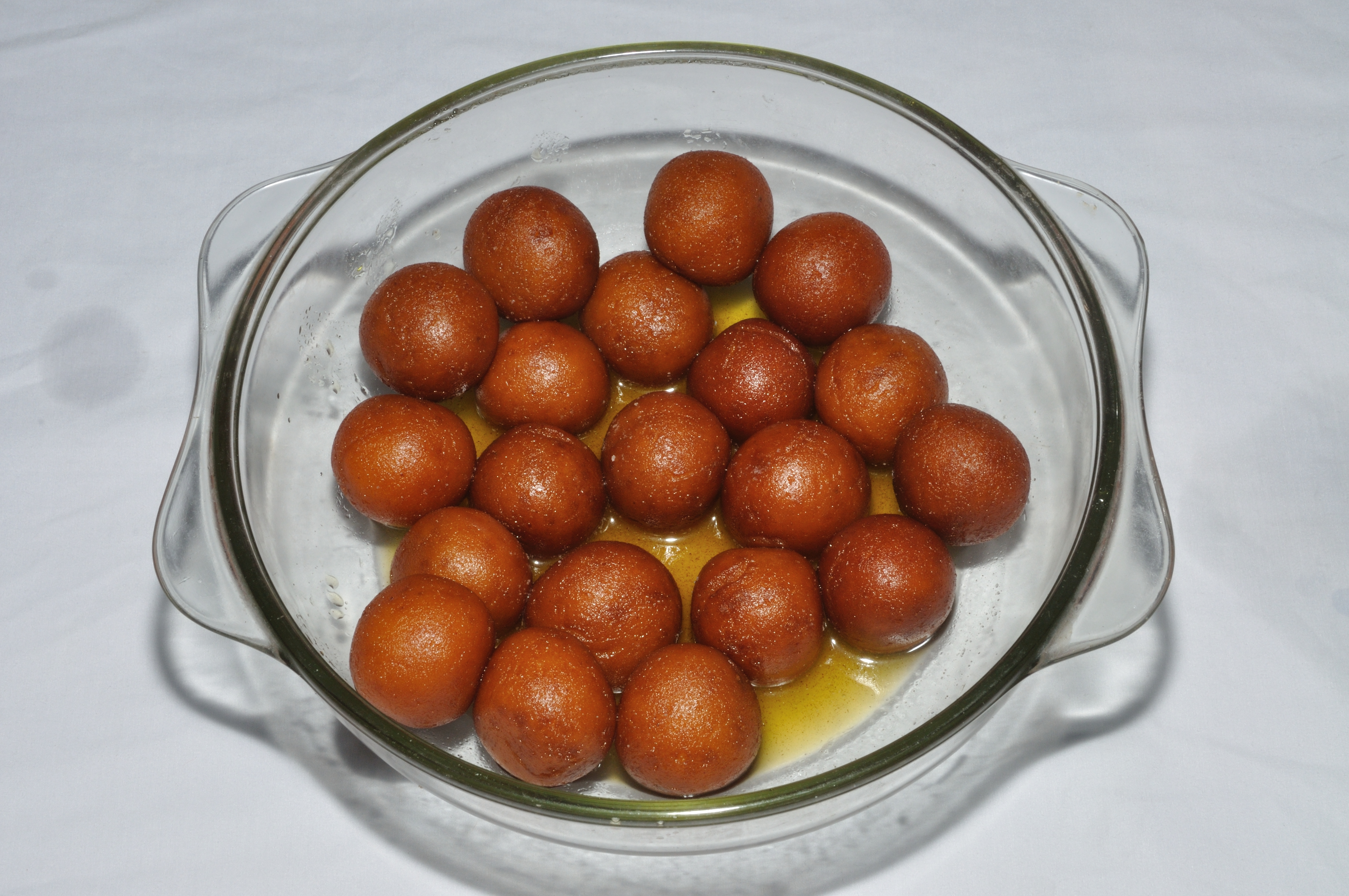
- Pantua served in a bowl
- Type: Confectionery
- Course: Dessert
- Region or state: Bengal, Indian subcontinent
- Associated cuisine: India, Bangladesh
- Main ingredients: Semolina, Chena, milk, ghee and sugar

Pantua (Bengali: পান্তুয়া) is a local confection from the Indian subcontinent, notable in West Bengal, Eastern India and Bangladesh. It is a traditional Bengali sweet made of deep-fried balls of semolina, chhena, milk, ghee and sugar syrup. Pantuas range in colour from pale brown to nearly black depending on how long they are fried. Rose water, cardamom or other flavourings are sometimes added to the sweet.

Pantua is very similar to the cheese-based fried sweet ledikeni. The distinctive feature of ledikeni is its molten sugar syrup of lightly flavored cardamom powder. The name ledikeni is a rendition of "Lady Canning" and was first used by confectioner Bhim Chandra Nag, when he renamed his pantuas specially prepared on the occasion of the birthday of Countess Charlotte Canning, wife of Governor-General Charles Canning. A sweet very similar to the modern pantua and ledikeni, but made of rice flour, is mentioned in the 12th century Sanskrit-language text Manasollasa. Pantua is the Bengali analogue of gulab jamun, a popular sweet in North India which itself was inspired by Mughlai cuisine (a blend of Indian and Iranian cuisine). However, gulab jamun is prepared from khoa and flavored with rose/gulab, while pantua is prepared from chhena and mainly flavored with cardamom/elaichi.

== See also ==
- Gulab jamun
- Ledikeni
- Lyangcha
