= Ledikeni =

Bengali sweet

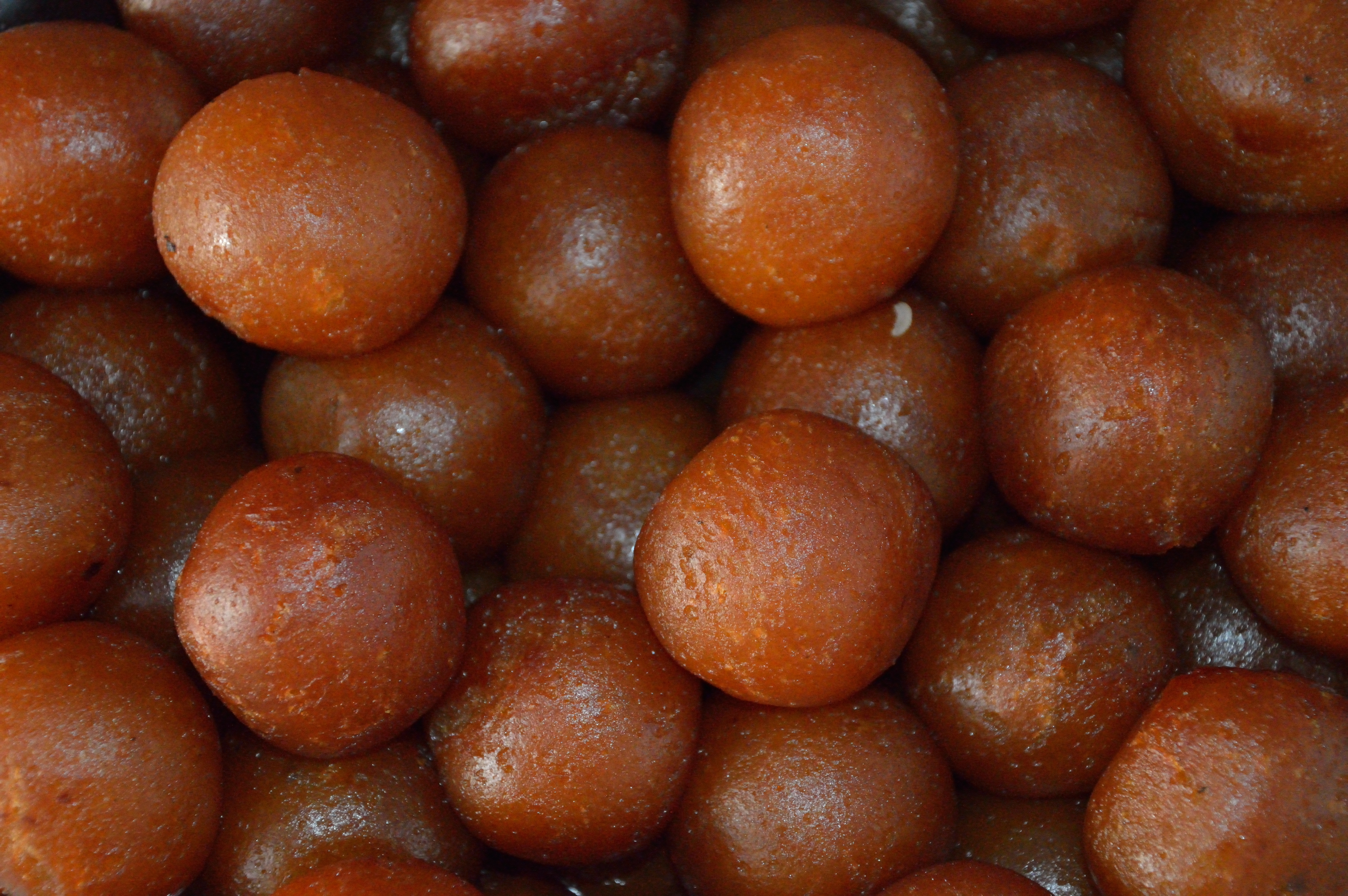
Ledikeni-Pantua as sold in the sweet shops.

Ledikeni (Bengali: লেডিকেনি) or Lady Kenny is a popular Bengali sweet consumed in West Bengal, India and Bangladesh. It is a light fried reddish-brown sweet ball made of Chhena and flour, soaked in sugar syrup. Ledikeni is named after Lady Canning, the first vicereine of India and the wife of Charles Canning, the Governor General of India during 1856–62. It is very similar to pantua, another popular Bengali sweet.

== History ==
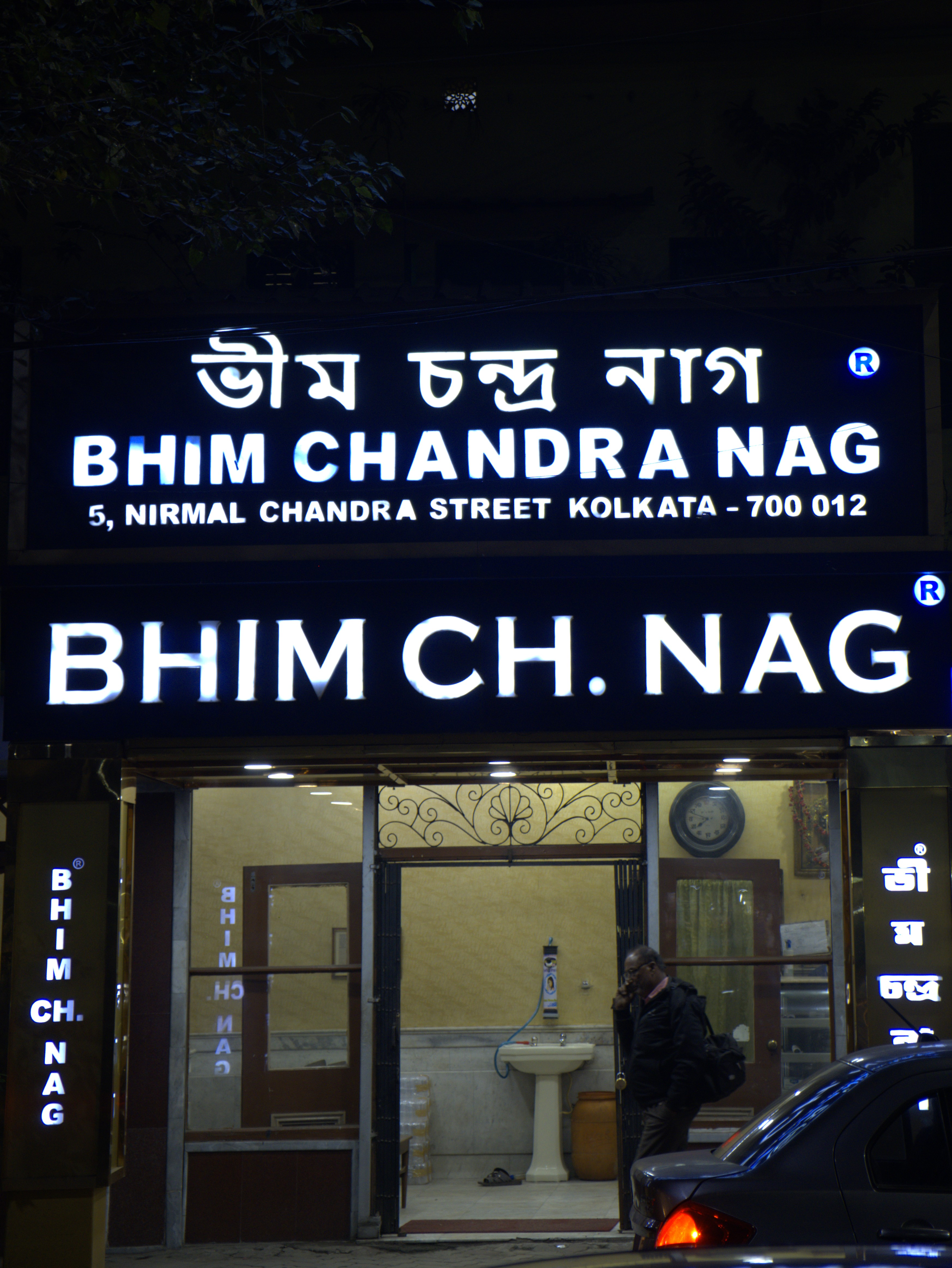
The entrance of Bhim Chandra Nag, the sweet shop attributed to the invention of Ledikeni.

The sweet originated in Kolkata in the middle of the 19th century. There are various legends regarding the origin of the sweet. According to the most popular legend, a special sweetmeat was prepared by Bhim Chandra Nag in the honour of Lady Canning at some point during her stay in India from 1856 till her death in 1861. In some versions of the tale, the sweetmeat was prepared to commemorate her visit to India in 1856, while in other versions, it was prepared on the occasion of her birthday. Some variations of the tale state that it became her favourite dessert, which she would demand on every occasion. According to yet another legend, the sweet was prepared by the confectioners of Baharampur after the 1857 Mutiny, to commemorate the visit by the Cannings.

Lady Canning died in 1861. Since then the sweet has gained popularity in Bengal. No grand feast was considered complete without the sweetmeat being offered to the guests. The manufacturer was said to have made a lot of money by selling the sweet although some have claimed that its popularity is due to the name rather than the taste. As it gained popularity, it came to be known as "Lady Canning" which over time vernacularized into "ledikeni".

A sweet very similar to the modern pantua and ledikeni, but made of rice flour, is mentioned in the 12th century Sanskrit-language text Manasollasa.

It remains a popular sweet in West Bengal and is still sold in the traditional sweet shops of Kolkata.

== See also ==
- Pantua
- Gulab Jamun
