= Charlotte Canning, Countess Canning =

British artist and the first vicereine of India

Her Excellency The Right Honourable The Countess Canning
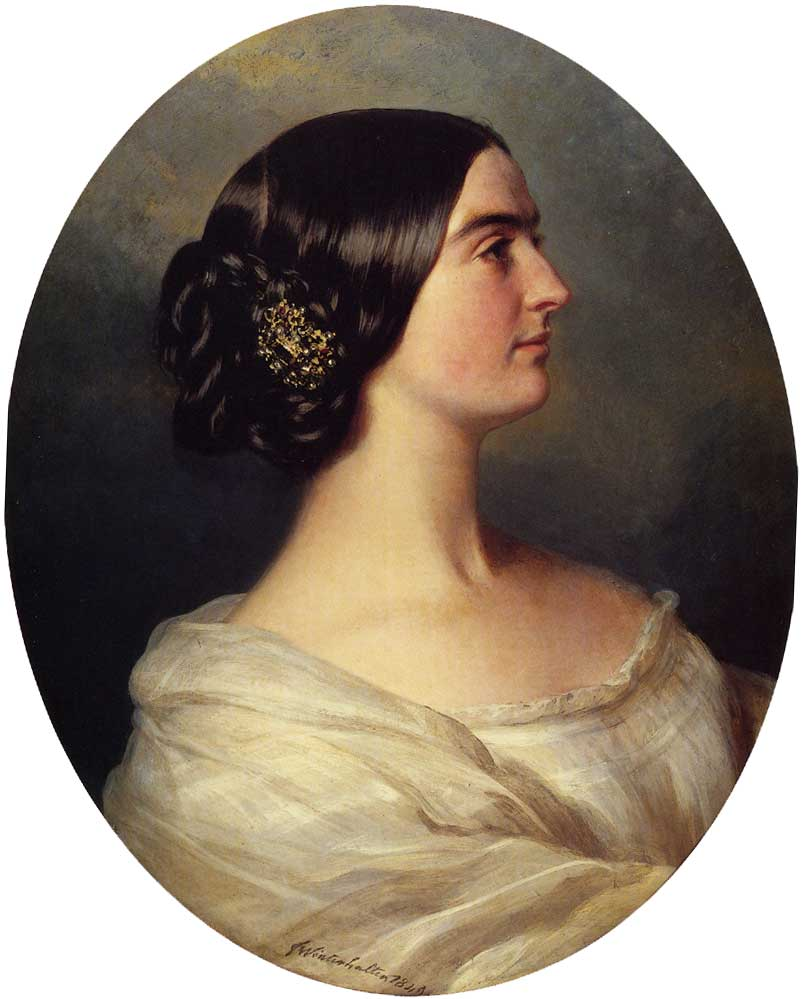
- Lady Canning, by Franz Winterhalter (1849)

Viceregal-Consort of India
- In office 1 November 1858 – 18 November 1861
- Monarch: Victoria
- Governor- General: The Earl Canning
- Preceded by: position established
- Succeeded by: The Countess of Elgin

Personal details
- Born: 31 March 1817 Paris, France
- Died: 18 November 1861 (aged 44) Calcutta, Bengal Presidency, British India
- Spouse: Charles Canning, 1st Earl Canning (m. 1835)
- Parents: Charles Stuart, 1st Baron Stuart de Rothesay (father); Lady Elizabeth Yorke (mother)

Charlotte Canning, Countess Canning (née Stuart; 31 March 1817 – 18 November 1861) was a British aristocrat, artist and the first Vicereine of India. She was one of India's most prolific women artists – two portfolios in the Victoria and Albert Museum contain some 350 watercolours by her, the result of four major tours in the country. Her husband was Charles Canning, who served as Governor-General of India from 1856 to 1858 and then as Viceroy of India until 1862.

As the elder daughter of the British ambassador to France, she was born and raised in Paris. She moved to England with her family in 1831, marrying Canning four years later. From 1842 to 1855, Lady Canning served as a Lady of the Bedchamber to Queen Victoria and was a favourite of the monarch. She moved to Calcutta in 1856 upon her husband's appointment, and two years later she became India's first vicereine when the British Crown took over India.

As an artist and botanist Lady Canning collected flowers and plants during her frequent trips around India, while drawing the natural scenes around her. She became ill shortly before her scheduled return to England, and died of malaria in Calcutta. Her death was widely reported in England, where she was exemplified as a symbol of feminine virtue in the Victorian era. A type of Indian dessert, ledikeni, is named after her.

== Early life and marriage ==
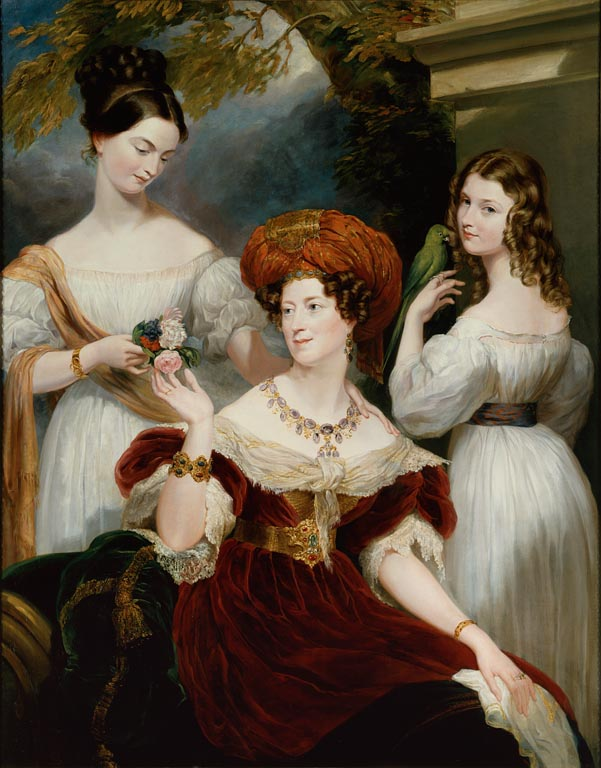
Charlotte Stuart with her mother and sister, by George Hayter in 1830

Charlotte Stuart was born on 31 March 1817 at the British embassy in Paris. Her father was the British ambassador, Sir Charles Stuart (later Baron Stuart de Rothesay), a grandson of the 3rd Earl of Bute. Her mother was Lady Elizabeth Yorke, a daughter of Philip Yorke, 3rd Earl of Hardwicke.

Charlotte's grandmother, the Countess of Hardwicke, was present for the birth; in a letter, she observed that the "first look of the young lady was so strikingly like her father as to make us all laugh". She was named after her godmother Queen Charlotte. A year later, Charlotte was joined by a younger sister, Louisa Anne (later Marchioness of Waterford); the pair were considered beautiful despite the plain looks of their parents.

Charlotte stayed in Paris with her family, acquiring a fluency in French, until 1831 when her father finished his posting as ambassador. They returned to London where they lived in a newly constructed residence in Carlton House Terrace. Three years after returning to London, in 1834, Charlotte came out in society. Shortly after doing so, she met the Hon. Charles Canning, only remaining son of the former prime minister, George Canning. The younger Canning proposed and Charlotte consented, but her father declined to permit the match due to political disagreements he held with George Canning. Eventually, under family pressure, he agreed to allow the marriage.

Charlotte married Charles Canning on 5 September 1835 at St Martin-in-the-Fields, London. He was elected to the British Parliament the following year, and in 1837 succeeded to his mother's title as Viscount Canning, whereupon Charlotte became Viscountess Canning. In 1859 Charles was raised in the peerage as Earl Canning and Charlotte became Countess Canning.

== Lady of the Bedchamber ==
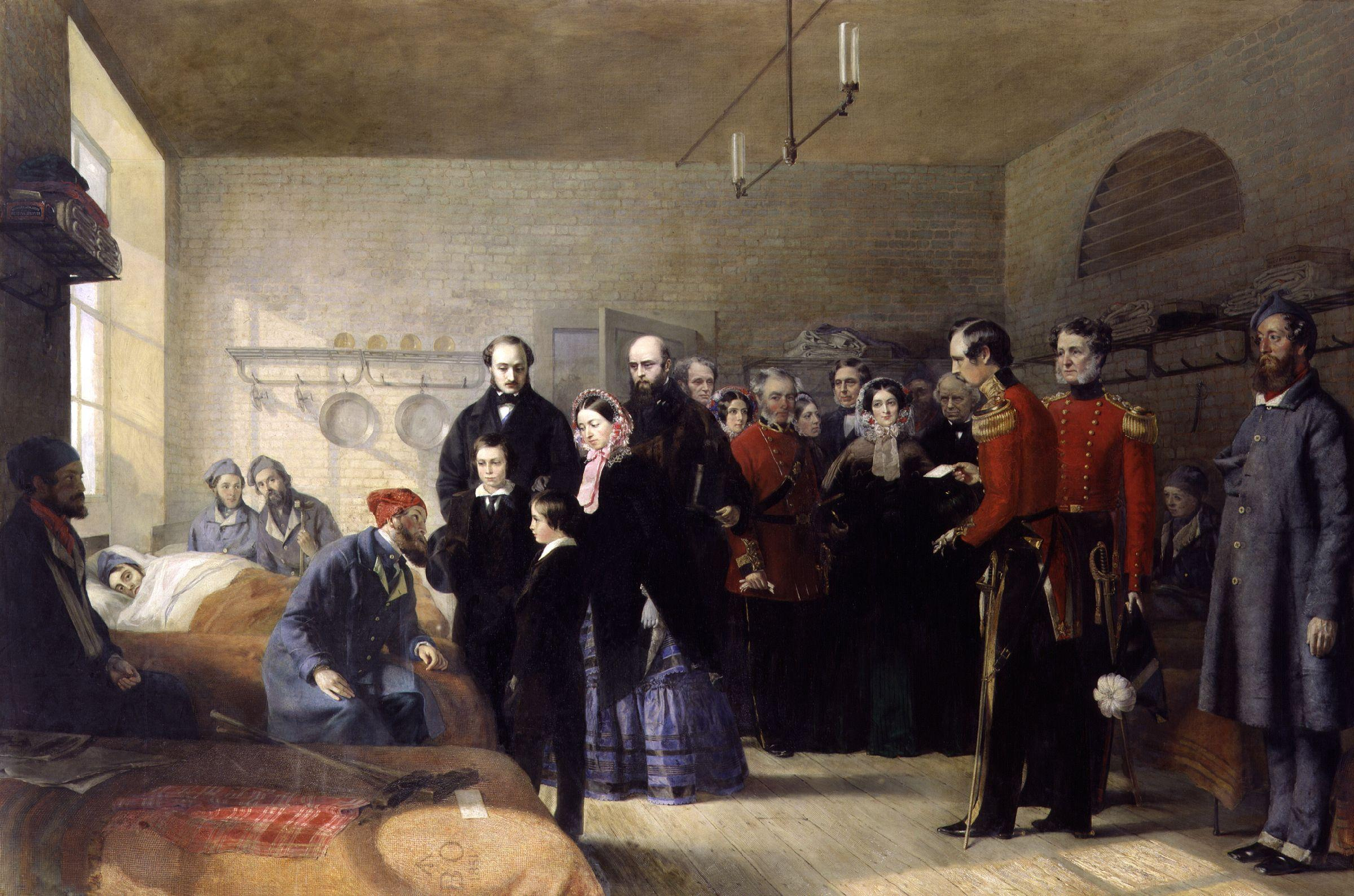
Queen Victoria's First Visit to her Wounded Soldiers by Jerry Barrett, 1859, with Lady Canning in attendance

In 1842, Charlotte was appointed as a Lady of the Bedchamber to Queen Victoria, becoming a favourite of both Victoria and her husband Prince Albert. She accepted the offer within a day, writing that serving the queen was a "source of pride and gratification". She may have consented for financial reasons, as the family, while respectable, was not wealthy. Her childless marriage to Lord Canning was also not the happiest of unions.

Charlotte held this position until 1855. Hubbard notes many traits that likely secured Charlotte her role in the Victorian court. In addition to being well-connected – as the daughter of an ambassador and spouse of a rising politician – Charlotte was of respectable character; she was discreet, intelligent, socially adept, and beautiful. She was also fluent in French, making her useful in certain social situations, and she was known for her intelligent conversation. Being a Lady of the Bedchamber was largely ceremonial; Charlotte served as a companion of the queen, accompanying her on daily outings and to formal ceremonies. She also entertained visiting royals and dined with the queen when Victoria was not with her family.

Lady Canning was an adherent of Anglicanism, her religious views tending towards high church traditions, despite Victoria's personal dislike of this perspective. Victoria favoured worship within the Presbyterian tradition found within the Church of Scotland; her ladies-in-waiting were drawn from different wings of the Established Churches.

== Vicereine of India ==
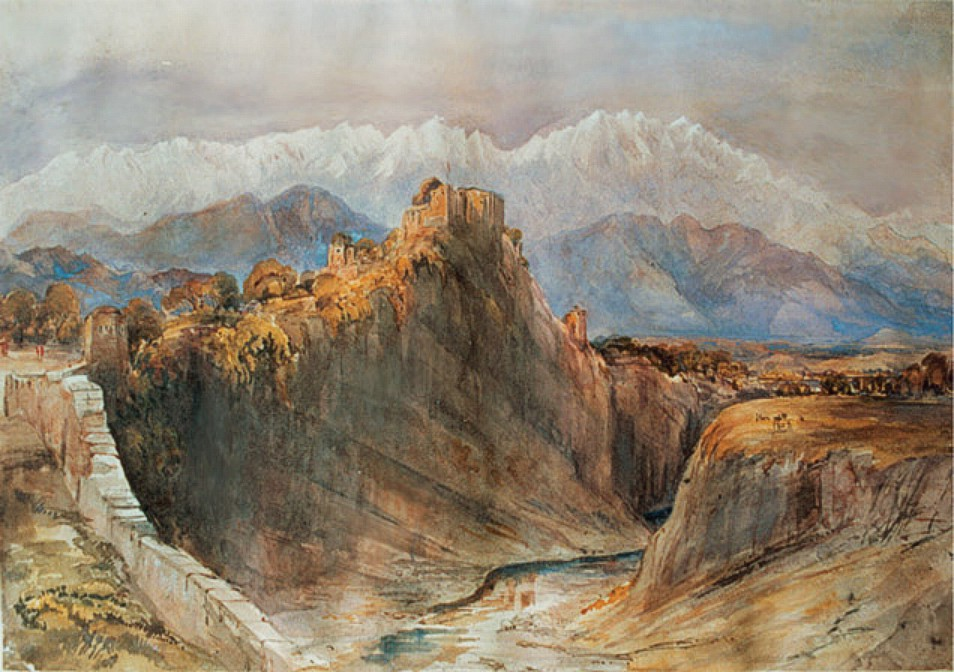
Watercolour by Lady Canning, of the Hill Fort of Kangra, Kangra Valley, Himachal Pradesh, 1860

Lord Canning was appointed Governor-General of India, and the couple moved to the country in January 1856. They resided at Government House in Calcutta. She disliked the formality and routine of the residence, writing that "its greatest sin is its intense dullness". The couple spent their retreats at Barrackpore, a "resonantly Anglicized place" sixteen miles from central Calcutta. An accomplished botanist, Canning came to love Barrackpore's "jungly" characteristics, noting that the "luxuriant growth in the jungly ground outside, of dazzling green during the Rains, is more beautiful than I can describe and I always think of the Palm House at Kew".

Lady Canning was in the country during the India Mutiny, a rebellion in India against the rule of the British East India Company that ran from May 1857 to July 1859. Her husband was much criticized for his perceived clemency of the rebels, but the Cannings had the firm support of Queen Victoria. After the end of the Mutiny, rule of India was transferred over to the British Crown. Lord Canning was made its viceroy, making his wife the country's first vicereine. Her new position lacked official duties, but she did play a social role and partook in philanthropic efforts.

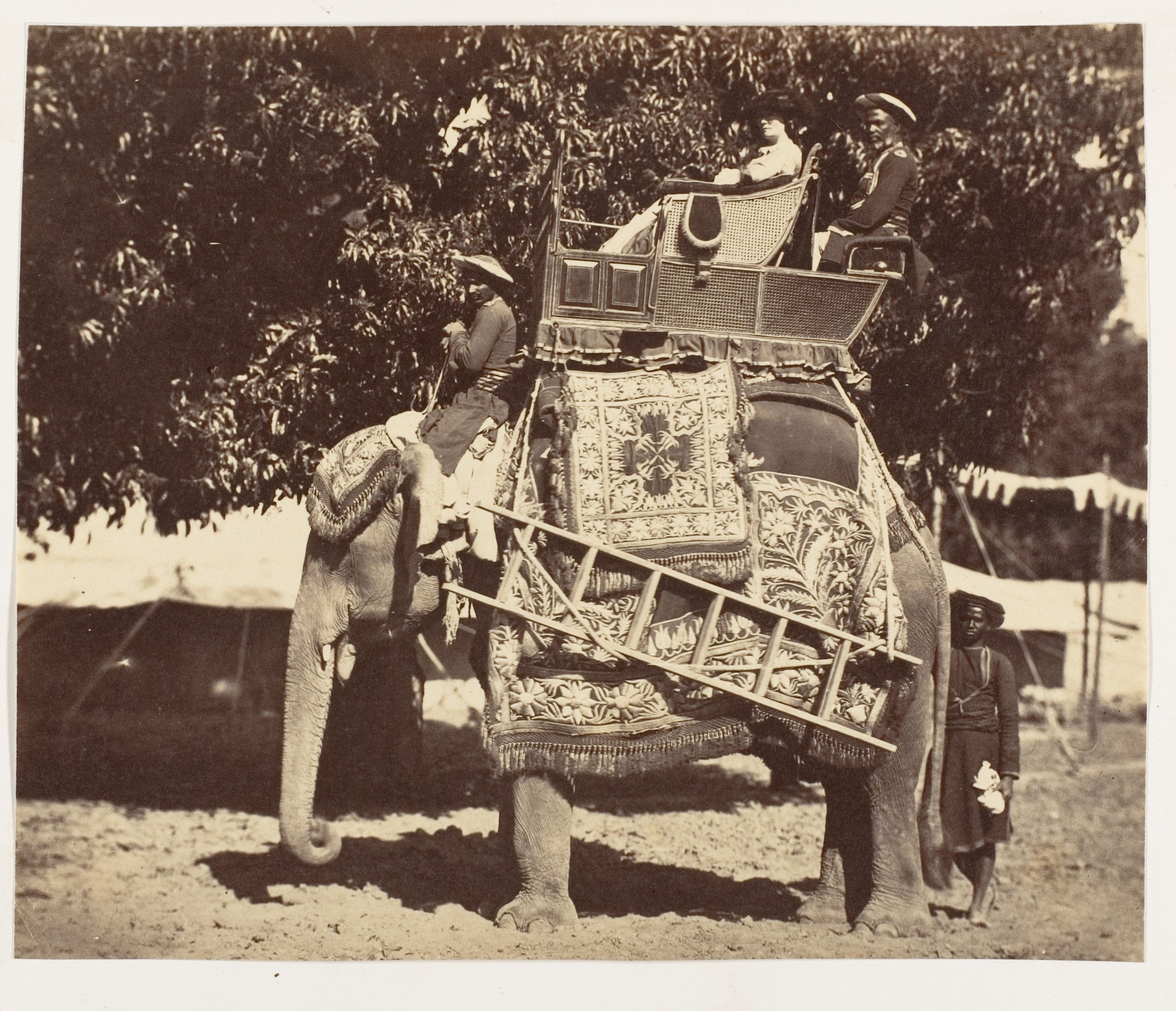
On an elephant, 1858–61, by Oscar Mallitte

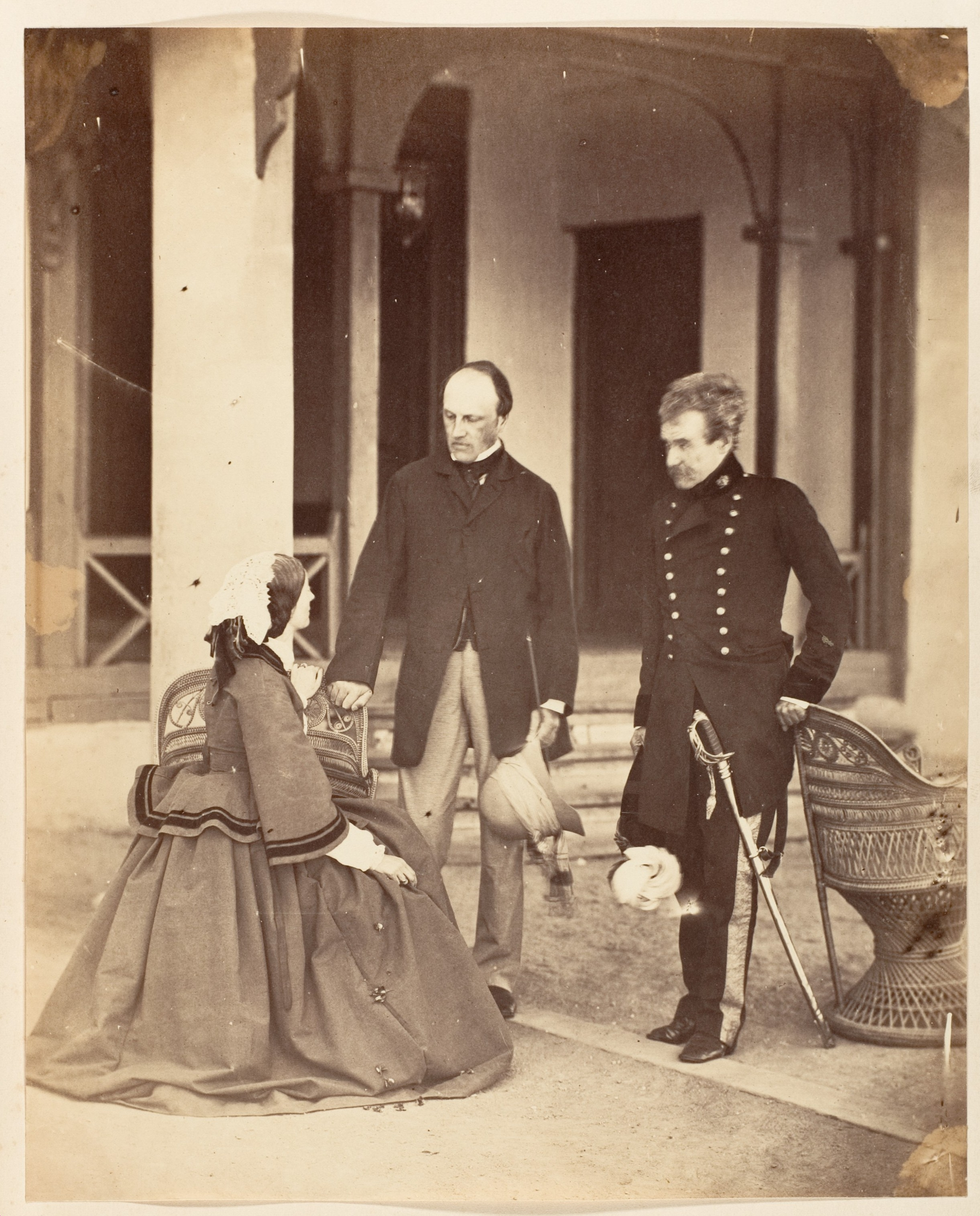
At Simla with her husband and Lord Clyde, Commander-in-Chief, 1860

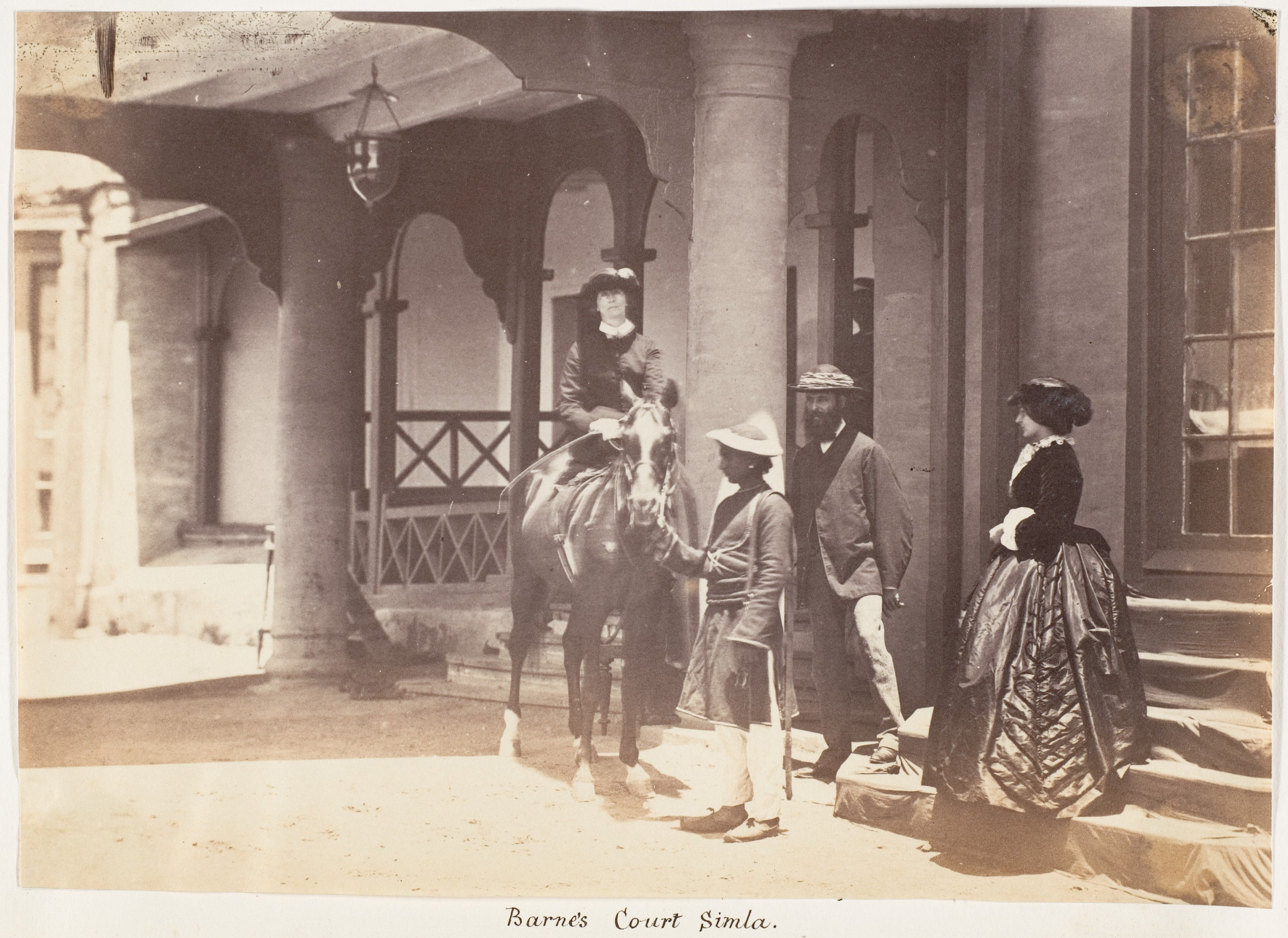
Lady Canning, Major Jones and Lady Campbell, Simla, 1860

== Artistry ==
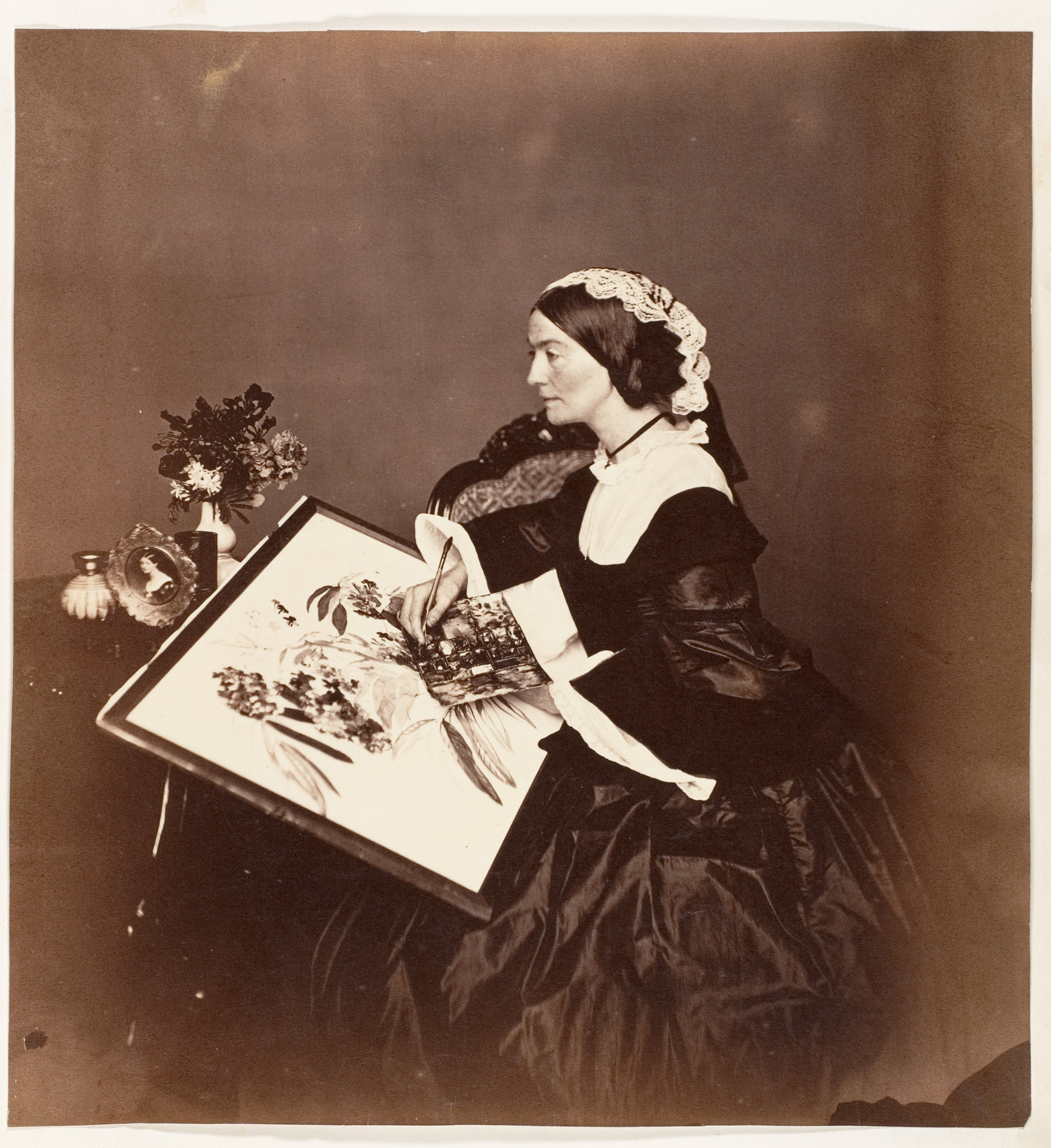
Photographed by Henry Hering for a carte de visite around 1860

Owing to her high position in the country, Charlotte once described her situation as being "isolated to a degree I could never have imagined". She found comfort in her collection and artistic renderings of India's flora, and devoted much of her time to the garden at Barrackpore. As an amateur artist, Canning favoured watercolours and kept many portfolios of her works. The historian Eugenia W. Herbert describes Charlotte as the "most memorable and the most accomplished of the women botanical illustrators in India". Her efforts fill the pages of nineteen volumes, currently being held in Harewood House. She was also one of India's earliest photographers, taking many photos, and also commissioning and collecting others.

Also interested in natural history, Charlotte collected samples when travelling with her husband on his tours of India. Her cousin accompanied one of these trips and noted that Charlotte's "genuine love of plants and flowers makes every step in this country of interest to her." She also travelled without her husband. She kept a journal and wrote frequently to Queen Victoria, providing detailed accounts of life in India to the fascinated monarch. She also sent nature samples to Victoria's children. Victoria, in turn, replied regularly. Much of their correspondence still remains.

== Death and legacy ==
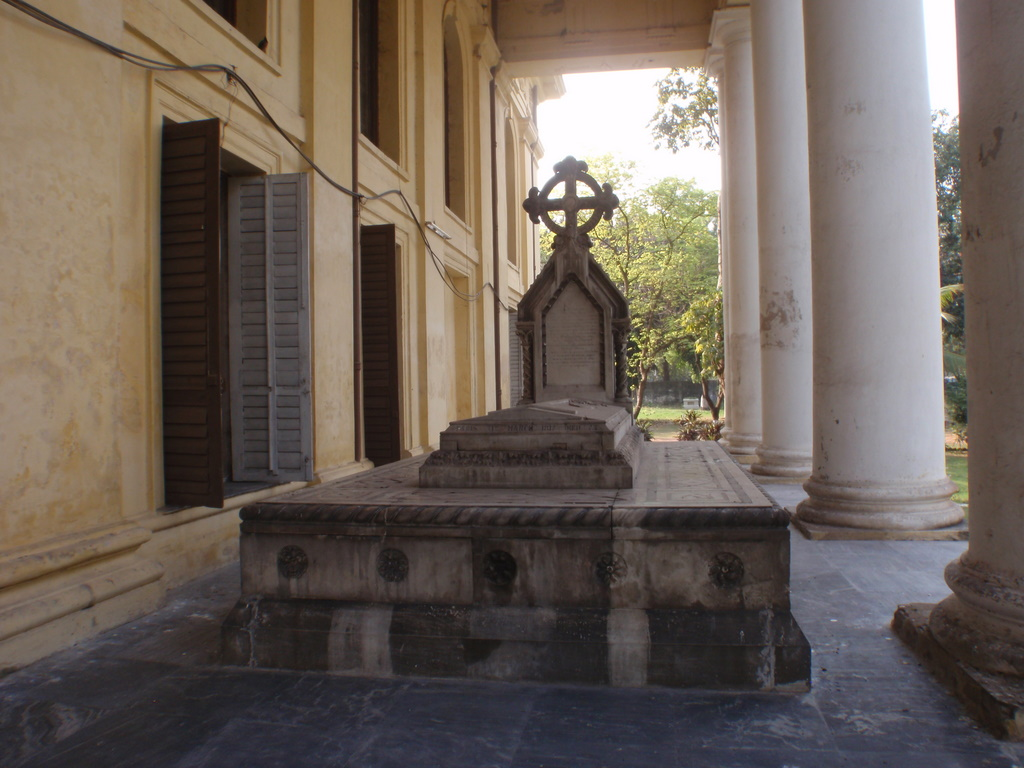
Lady Canning's memorial at St. John's Church, Calcutta

After five years in India, Charlotte looked forward to returning to England and her family, with the intended departure date planned for sometime in January 1862. Queen Victoria had granted her rangership of Greenwich Park. She embarked on one final trip to see the mountains surrounding Darjeeling in October, and continued her trip into the following month by returning to Calcutta. She became ill during the journey and died at Government House of malaria, in her husband's arms. She was buried on the grounds of Barrackpore, in a small garden her husband described as a "beautiful spot" that looked upon a river she "was so fond of drawing". News of her demise reached Queen Victoria shortly before the death of her own husband, Prince Albert, in December.

Lady Canning's death was widely reported in England, where it "generated an extraordinary, unanimous demonstration of patriotic grief." She was exemplified as a symbol of feminine virtue across the British Empire, and her death was said to have "cast a gloom over Calcutta." Lord Canning grieved heavily and visited her grave daily; known for his reserved demeanour, he broke down into tears when comforted by the Bishop of Calcutta. He sent details of her final days to Queen Victoria, not realising that the monarch was also in mourning for the loss of a spouse. He did not long outlive his wife, dying the following year of liver disease. As a result, it fell to his heir Hubert de Burgh-Canning, to arrange for the construction of her tomb. By 1913, her grave and memorial were located adjacent to St John's Church in Calcutta, which is now viewable to the public.

Two portfolios in the Victoria and Albert Museum contain many of her watercolours and drawings. In India, a sweet dessert called ledikeni (or "Lady Kenny") bears Lady Canning's name. It is very similar to a pantua and is made of chhana and flour, and soaked in sugar syrup. There are several legends behind the dessert's origins; one holds that a confectioner named his concoction after Lady Canning in honour of her birthday, while another says the sweetmeat was prepared to commemorate her visit to India in 1856. It is said that it became more famous because of its name than its taste. It became fashionable among the Bengali elite to eat ledikeni in the decades after her death.

== Bibliography ==
- Augustus Hare, The story of two noble lives : being memorials of Charlotte, Countess Canning, and Louisa, Marchioness of Waterford, London: George Allen, 1893
- Charles Allen, A Glimpse of the Burning Plain: Leaves from the Indian Journals of Charlotte Canning, London: Michael Joseph, 1987 ISBN 978-0-7181-2667-4
- Fowler, Marian Elizabeth (1987). Below the Peacock Fan: First Ladies of the Raj. Viking Press. ISBN 978-0-670-80748-2. OCLC 17576624. OL 3236422W. Wikidata Q126672688.
