= Kewra =

Essential oil derived from fragrant screwpine

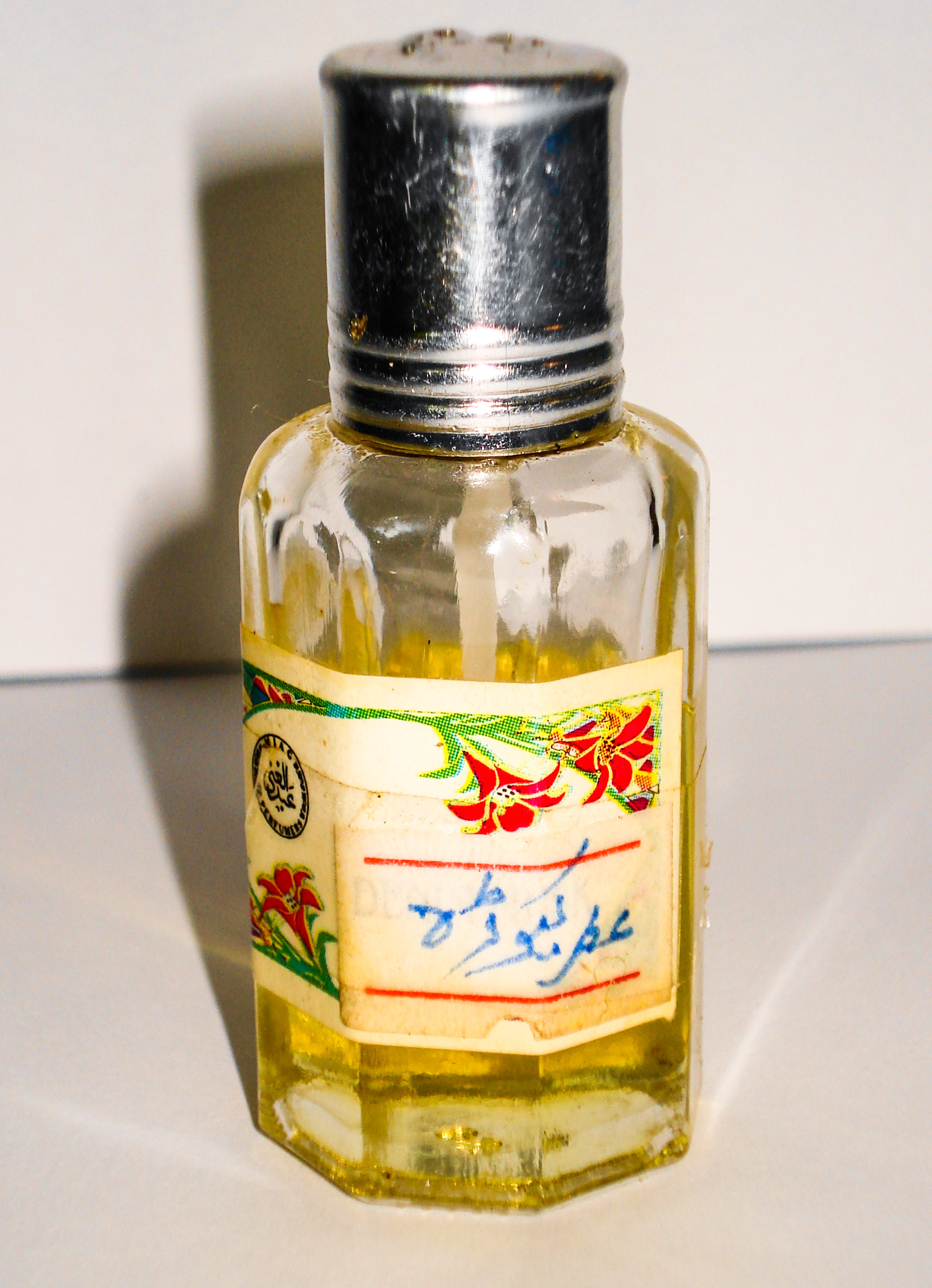
Bottle of kewra

Kewra, keora or kewda (Hindi: केवड़ा, Bengali: কেওড়া, Urdu: کیوڑہ, Punjabi: کیوڑا (Shahmukhi) ਕੇਵੜਾ (Gurmukhi)) is an essential oil distilled from the male flower of the fragrant screwpine. The plant is native to Tropical Asia, Southeast Asia and Australasia, and the oil is used as a flavoring agent throughout much of these regions.

The flower is a vital ingredient in kewra and is used in special-occasion dishes in South Asia, particularly those associated with Muslim communities. Kewra flowers have a sweet, perfumed odour with a pleasant quality similar to rose flowers, but kewra is more fruity. The aqueous distillate (kewra water, pandanus flower water) is quite diluted.. Kewra flowers and leaves are also essential in certain communities' worship of Hindu goddess Manasa.

Approximately 95% of kewra flowers exported from India are collected from areas surrounding Brahmapur city in Ganjam district. The coastal areas of Chhatrapur, Rangeilunda, Patrapur, and Chikiti are famous for their aromatic pandanus plantations. The most famous varieties are endemic to and cultivated in Gopalpur-on-Sea. Cultivation of the kewra flower is a major source of income in Ganjam district and there are nearly 200 registered kewra distillation factories. Kewra is also used in traditional Indian perfumery, both as a functional fragrance and in attar.

== Chemical composition: abstract ==
The chemical composition of the essential oils obtained by water distillation of the staminate inflorescences of Kewda (Pandanus odorifer. var. fasicularis). The major components of kewda oil were found to be 2-phenethyl methyl ether (65.6–75.4%), Terpinen-4-ol (11.7–19.5%), p-Cymene (1.0–3.1%) and Alpha Terpineol (1.2–2.9%)

== See also ==
- Ganjam Kewda Flower
- Ganjam Kewda Rooh
