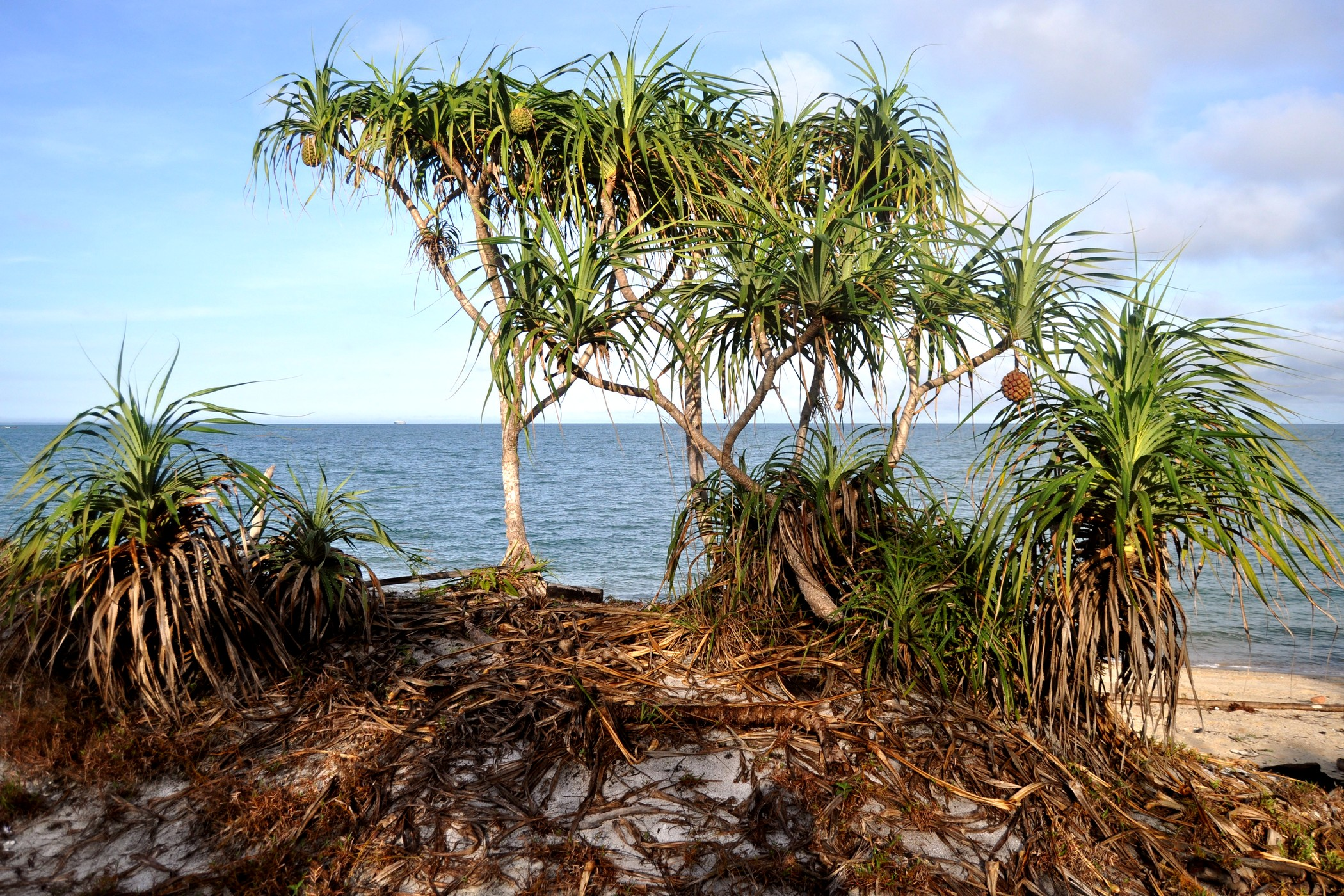

Conservation status
- Least Concern (IUCN 3.1)

Scientific classification
- Kingdom: Plantae
- Clade: Tracheophytes
- Clade: Angiosperms
- Clade: Monocots
- Order: Pandanales
- Family: Pandanaceae
- Genus: Pandanus
- Species: P. odorifer

Binomial name
- Pandanus odorifer (Forssk.) Kuntze

Synonyms
- Athrodactylis spinosa J.R.Forst. & G.Forst. nom. illeg.; Bromelia sylvestris Burm.f.; Eydouxia delessertii Gaudich.; Hasskarlia leucacantha Walp.; Keura odora Thunb.; Keura odorifera Forssk.; Marquartia leucacantha Hassk.; Pandanus adduensis H.St.John; Pandanus albibracteatus H.St.John; Pandanus alloios H.St.John; Pandanus ambiglaucus H.St.John; Pandanus blancoi Kunth; Pandanus boryi Gaudich.; Pandanus carnosus H.St.John; Pandanus chelyon H.St.John; Pandanus delessertii (Gaudich.) Warb.; Pandanus fascicularis Lam.; Pandanus fosbergii H.St.John; Pandanus globosus H.St.John; Pandanus hartmanii H.St.John; Pandanus hendersonii H.St.John; Pandanus hueensis H.St.John; Pandanus impar H.St.John; Pandanus inclinatus H.St.John; Pandanus incrassatus H.St.John; Pandanus integriapicis H.St.John; Pandanus intraconicus H.St.John; Pandanus karikayo H.St.John; Pandanus leucanthus Hassk.; Pandanus linnaei Gaudich.; Pandanus littoralis Jungh.; Pandanus loureiroi Gaudich.; Pandanus maldivecus H.St.John; Pandanus millore Roxb.; Pandanus obtusus H.St.John; Pandanus odoratissimus L.f.; Pandanus odoratus Salisb.; Pandanus odoriferus (Forssk.); Pandanus phamhoangii H.St.John; Pandanus projectens H.St.John; Pandanus remotus H.St.John; Pandanus reversispiralis H.St.John; Pandanus rheedei Gaudich.; Pandanus rubricoloratus H.St.John; Pandanus rumphii Gaudich.; Pandanus semiorbicularis H.St.John; Pandanus sinensis (Warb.) Martelli; Pandanus smitinandii H.St.John; Pandanus spiralis Blanco nom. illeg.; Pandanus subcarnosus H.St.John; Pandanus subcubicus H.St.John; Pandanus subulatus H.St.John; Pandanus verus Rumph. ex Kurz nom. illeg.; Pandanus vietnamensis H.St.John

= Pandanus odorifer =

Species of flowering plant

Pandanus odorifer is an aromatic monocot species of plant in the family Pandanaceae, native to South East Asia, the Andaman Islands, the Philippines, and is also found wild in southern India and Burma. It is commonly known as fragrant screw-pine.

== Names ==
In addition to screw-pine, other common English names for the tree include kewda, fragrant screwpine, umbrella tree and screw tree.

In India, the tree goes by a variety of names, many deriving from the Sanskrit kētakī. in Kannada called ಕೇದಿಗೆ in Malayalam called pookkaitha and its flower known as thaazhampoo, In Tamil, it is called kaithai (கைதை) and tāḻai (தாழை) and both are mentioned in Sangam literature. It is called mogali (మొగలి) in Telugu. In Arabic-speaking countries, the tree is referred to as al-kādī (Arabic: الكادي). In Japan, the tree is called adan (アダン [阿檀]) and grows throughout most of the islands of Okinawa Prefecture, including the Okinawa Islands and Sakishima Islands, as well as the Tokara Islands and Amami Islands of Kagoshima Prefecture.

P. odorifer grows widely at the St. Martin's Island of Bangladesh, although many have been destroyed by mass tourism initiatives.

== Description ==
It is a small branched, palm-like dioecious tree with a flexuous trunk supported by brace roots. The tree can grow to a height of 4 meters. Leaves grow in clusters at the branch tips, with rosettes of sword-shaped, stiff (leather-like) and spiny bluish-green, fragrant leaves. Leaves are glaucous, 40–70 cm. long. In summer, the tree bears very fragrant flowers, used as perfume. Interestingly, Pandanus lacks a common callose wall around microspore tetrads during pollen development. In Yemen, they are predominantly found alongside flowing streams in the western escarpment foothills; Most common in high rainfall areas. The fragrant male flowers are wrapped in leaves and sold on roadsides and in markets. Only male plants seem to occur in Yemen. Some suggest that it was introduced into Yemen from India where its flowers are used chiefly to make perfume.

== Propagation ==
The tree is propagated vegetatively, by the offshoots of young plants that grow around the base of the trunk, but may also be increased by seed. If by the former method, the offshoots should be cut off and set in sand, at a temperature of 65° to 70 °F. The cuttings root slowly, and the plants for a time grow very slowly. The general treatment required for culturing the screw-pine is similar to that of palms. Trees require an abundance of water in summer.

According to Ibn al-'Awwam's 12th-century treatise on agriculture, the kadi is cultivated in a manner similar to that of the Judas tree (Cercis siliquastrum).

== Other uses ==
An aromatic oil called kewra and a fragrant distillate called keorra-ka-arak are extracted from the male flowers. They are almost exclusively used in the form of a watery distillate called kewra water. Its flowers have a sweet, perfumed odor that has a pleasant quality similar to rose flowers, although kewra is considered more fruity. The watered-down distillate is quite diluted; it can be used by the tablespoon.

The ketaki tree's flower is never used as an offering to the god Shiva. According to Hindu mythology, Shiva cursed the flower that it will never be used to worship him for helping Brahma lie against him, and then to Brahma that he will not be worshipped by people.

On Ishigaki Island, south-west of Okinawa, it is customary to use parts of the plant during Bon festivities as an offering. The soft shoots can also be eaten, although the taste is very astringent and the shoots are considered inedible without blanching them first. When they are properly treated however, the taste is similar to that of bamboo shoots.

Despite the pineapple-like appearance of the fruit and its sweet aroma, it is very fibrous and while being non-toxic, is generally not considered for consumption.

== Gallery ==
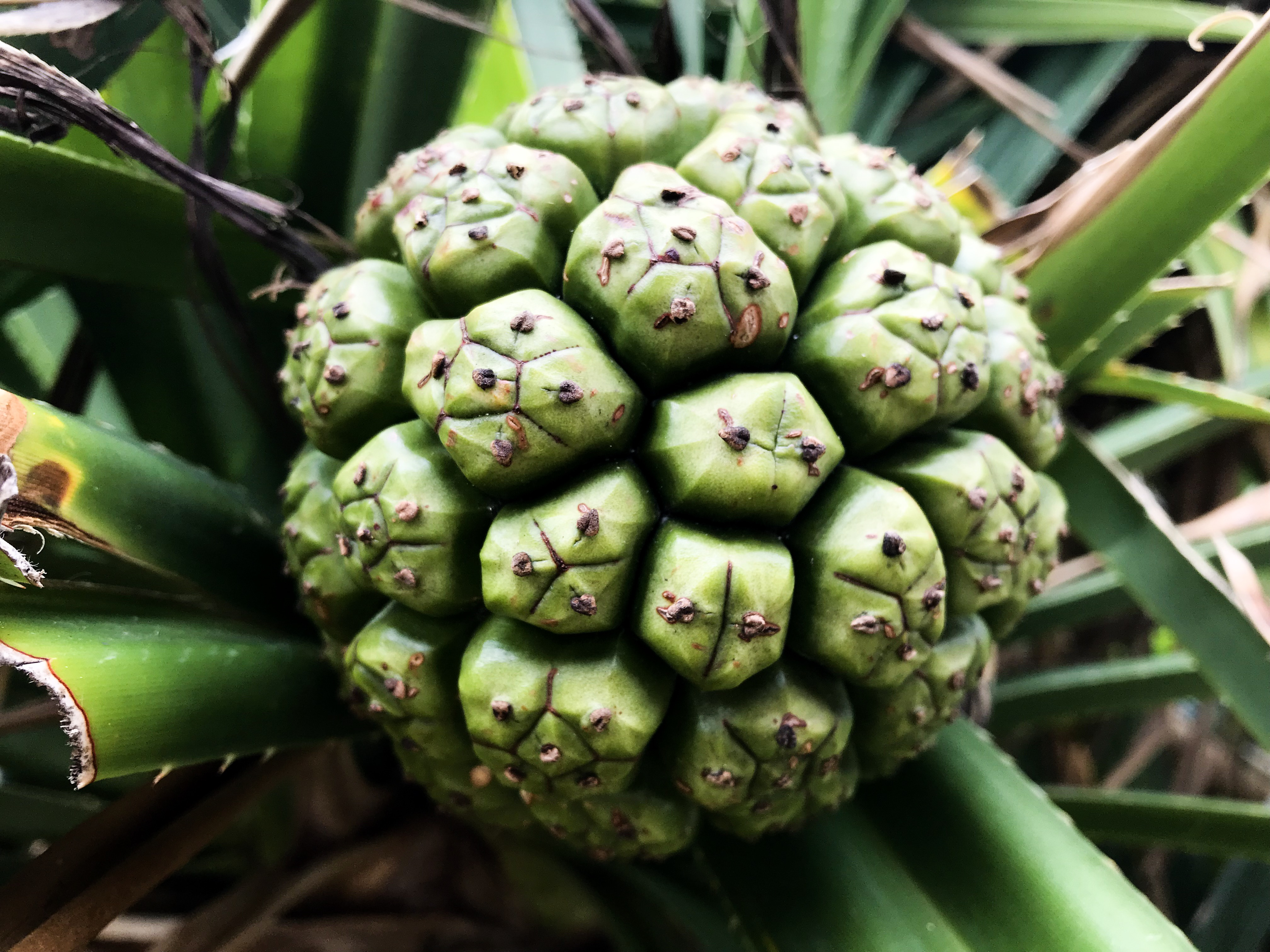
Pandanus odoratissimus on Miyako-jima, Okinawa prefecture

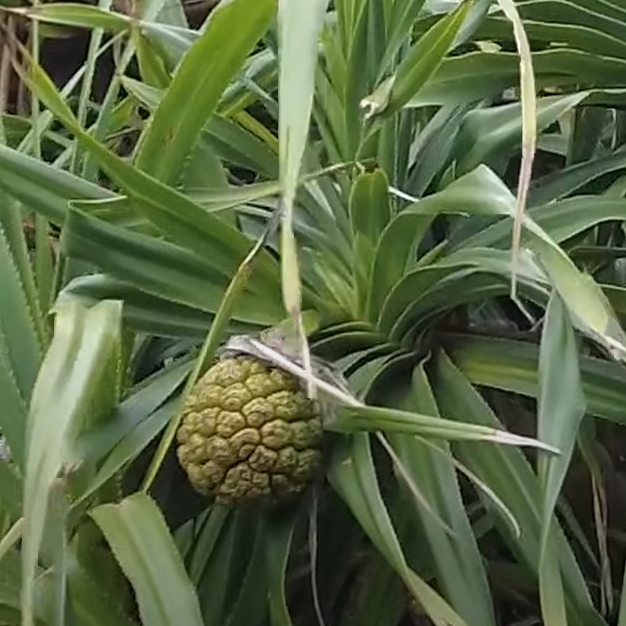
Adan on Takarajima (Southern Tokara Islands), Kagoshima prefecture.

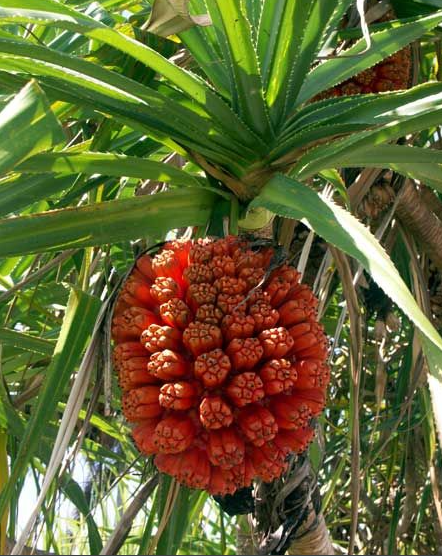
Ripe fruit of Pandanus odoratissimus. Iloilo City, The Philippines.

== See also ==
- Domesticated plants and animals of Austronesia
