= Braj cuisine =

Culinary traditions of Braj region

Braj cuisine is a cuisine originating from the Braj region of Northern India, which includes the Indian states of Uttar Pradesh, Rajasthan, Haryana and Madhya Pradesh. Braj, in ancient Hindu mythology, was the childhood home of Lord Krishna. The worship of Krishna in the region has influenced a gastronomic culture closely aligned with the principles of Satvik food. Dairy products that are commonly used in Braj cuisine are milk, cream, butter, ghee, mawa, yogurt, buttermilk and chhena. The high number of dairy products used as food source is with adherence to the region's devotion to Krishna.

== History and influence ==
Braj cuisine has its direct influences from Vaishnavism and its various Sampradayas like Pushtimarga tradition, Gaudiya Vaishnavism, Nimbarka Sampradaya, and Radhavallabhi tradition. Vaishnavism signified the devotion to Radha, Krishna, and to the holy cow. It also promoted the use of dairy products in worship and cuisine, with milk being considered a symbol of purity and nourishment.

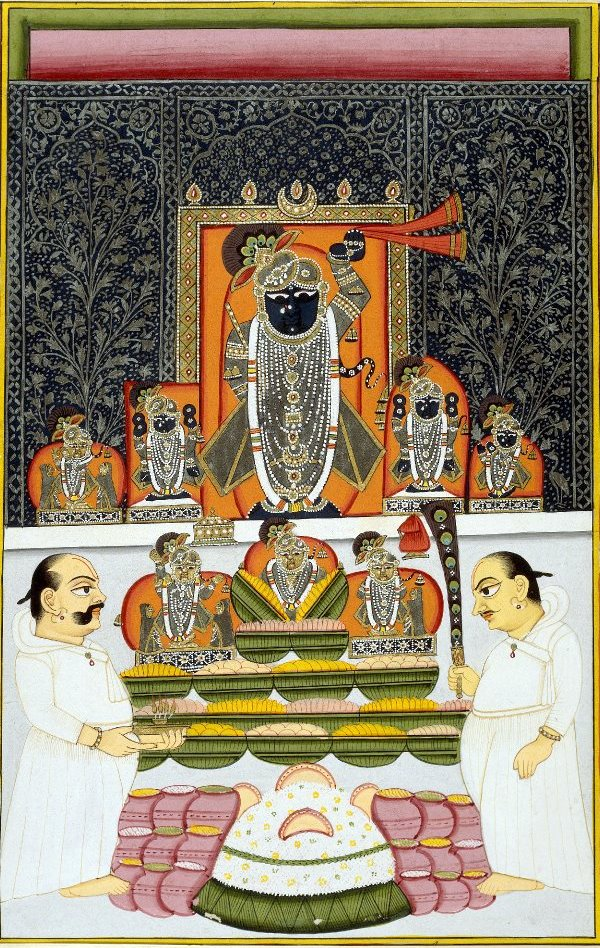
Rice offered to Shri Krishna during Annakuta festival by Pushtimarg Vaishnavite priests

Vegetarianism is another tenet of Braj cuisine, reflecting the Vaishnavite emphasis on ahimsa (non-violence) and compassion.

Ayurvedic principles have also influenced Braj cuisine, with a focus on using seasonal ingredients, whole grains, and balancing flavors to promote health and well-being. The region's fertile soil and favorable climate have made it an ideal place for growing a variety of fruits, vegetables, grains, and spices which are incorporated into the cuisine.

=== Etiquette of Brajwasi dining ===
Braj region is known for its community feasts known as Bhandara, where Satvik food is served to devotees at one place. Festivals in Braj region are associated with the Chhapan Bhog tradition where fifty six special food items are offered to Krishna and then distributed among its devotees.

== Popular dishes ==
Signature dishes of Braj cuisine include -

- Bedmi puri
- Dubki wale aloo
- Mathura peda – Indian Sweet dish
- Mathura Heeng Kachori
- Vrindavan Dahi Arbi jhor
- Vrindavan khichdi
- Janmashtami Panjiri
- Panchamrit prasad
- Agra Petha – Soft candy from the Indian subcontinent
- Agra Dalmoth
- Morena Tilpatti
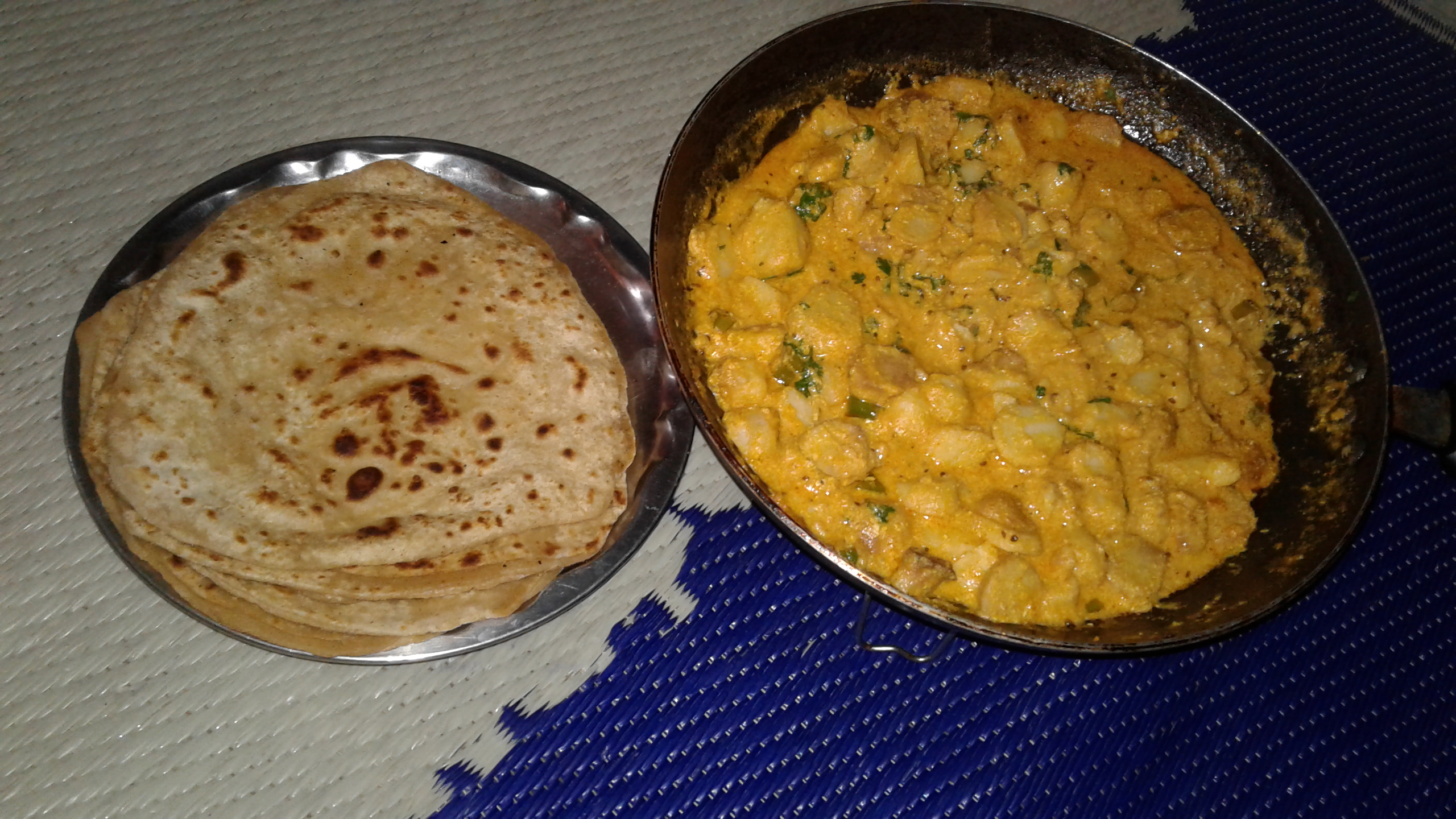
Vrindavan Dahi Arbi with paratha

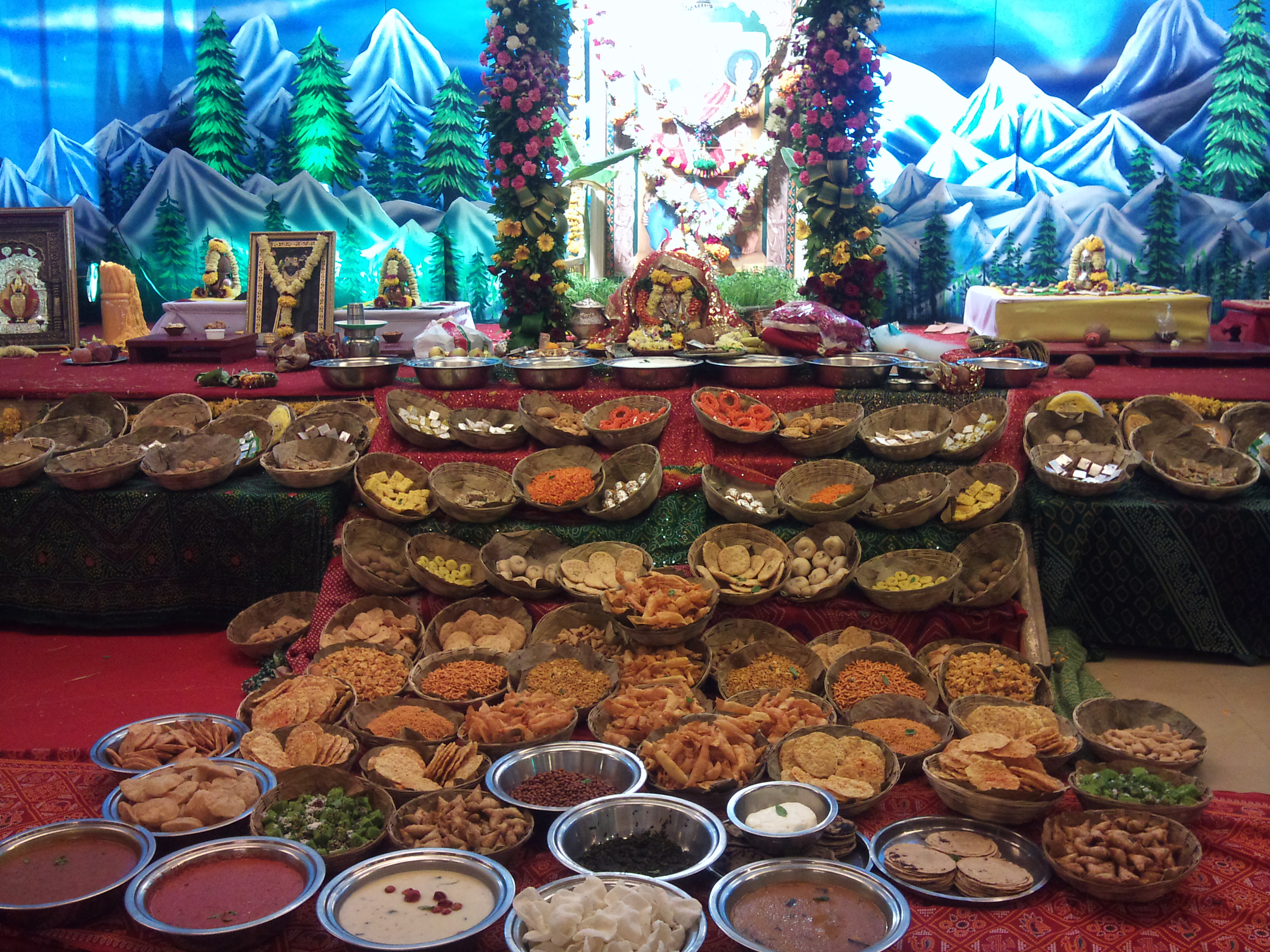
Chhapan Bhog offered to Shri Radha Krishna

== See also ==
- Janamashtami
- Annakut
