= Chandrakala (dessert) =

Indian sweet

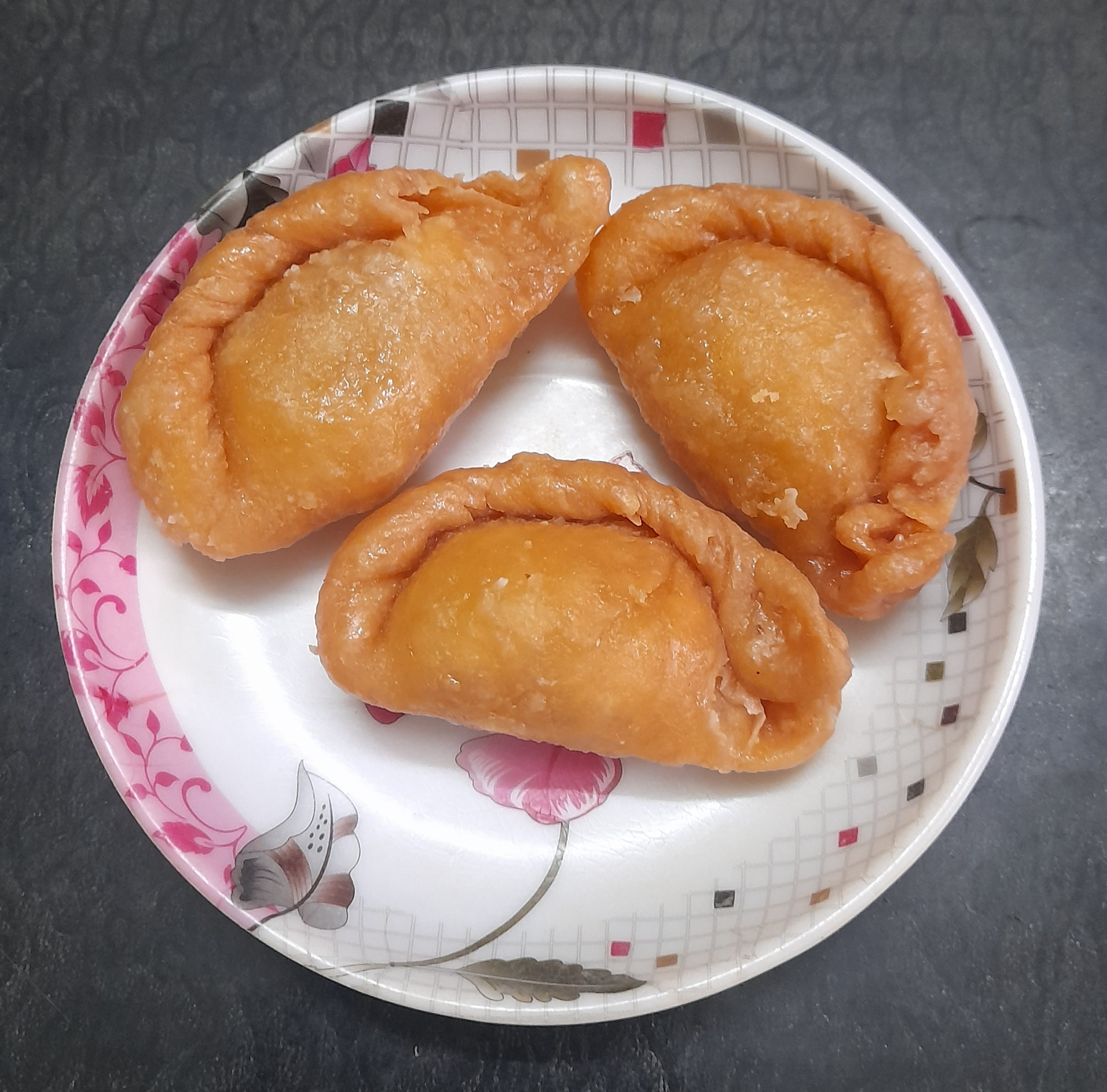
- Course: Dessert
- Place of origin: North India
- Region or state: Uttar Pradesh
- Created by: Guru Dayal Sharma
- Invented: 1949; 77 years ago
- Main ingredients: Maida flour, khoa, sugar, semolina, cardamom, coconut, almonds, cashews, pistachio, raisins

Chandrakala is a dessert from North India, similar to gujia. The outer pastry covering is made of Maida flour. The stuffing is traditionally made using dry fruits like raisins, coconut, almonds, and cashews, along with khoa, semolina (rava/sooji), cardamom (elaichi), sugar, and pistachio. Chandrakala gets its name from the shape. Chandrakala in Hindi means moonlight, so it is moon shaped (similar to the shape of a small Empanada). The outside is made of one dough circle that is folded over to form its moon shape. The shape can be a full circle with an alternative name of Suryakala, representing the shape of the sun.
