= Petha =

Soft candy from the Indian subcontinent

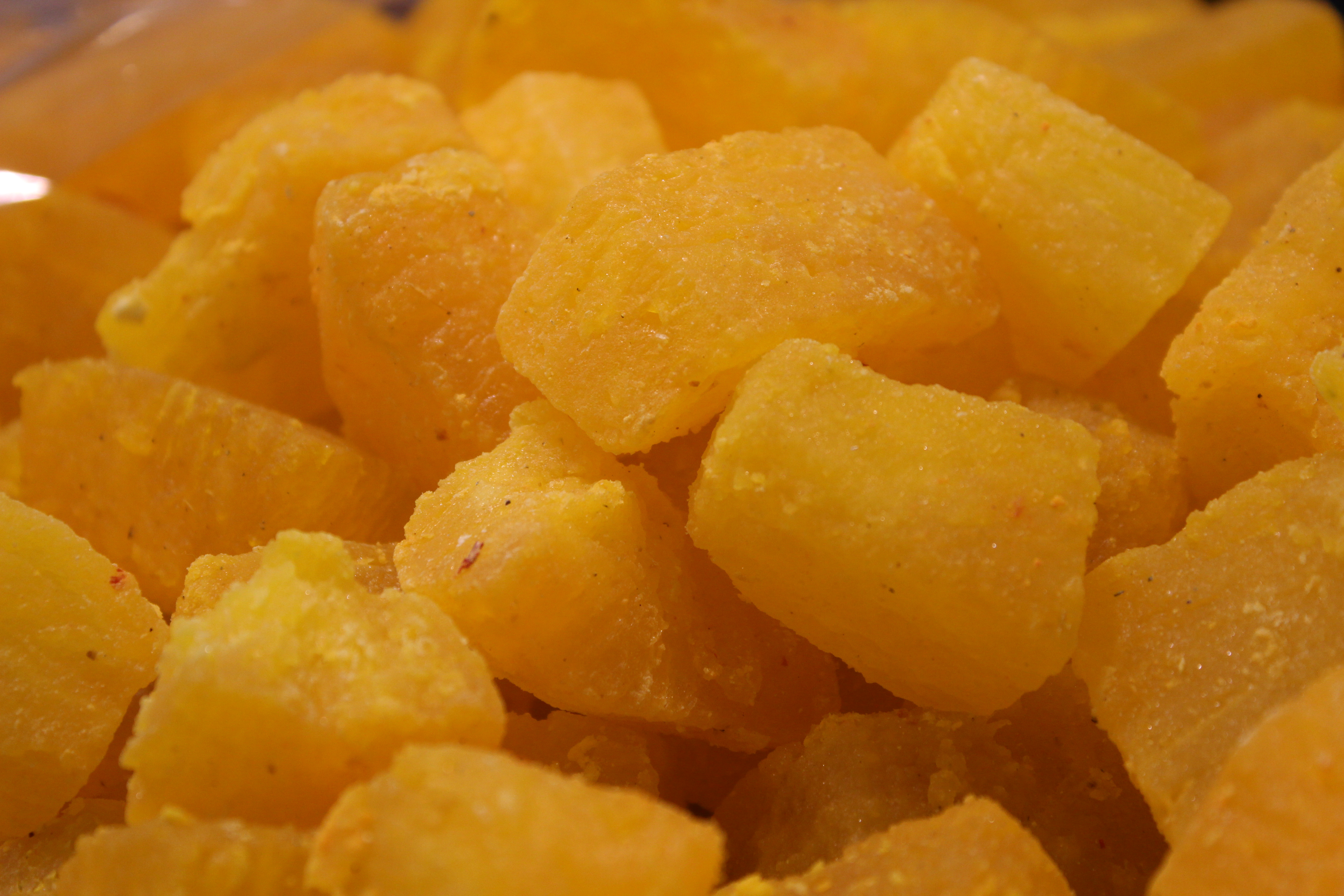
- Kesar Petha variant
- Course: Dessert
- Place of origin: Indian subcontinent
- Region or state: Agra, Uttar Pradesh
- Associated cuisine: Indian cuisine
- Invented: uncertain
- Main ingredients: Ash gourd, sugar
- Variations: Kesar Petha, Angoori Petha, Dry Petha, Chocolate Petha, Paan Petha, Gulab Petha
- Food energy (per serving): ~250

Petha (Hindi: पेठा pronounced [ˈpeːʈʰa]) is a translucent soft candy from the Indian subcontinent made from ash gourd or white pumpkin. It is simply called petha in Hindi and Urdu.

== Preparation ==
Ash gourds, commonly referred to as white pumpkins, are a vegetable with a pale-green exterior and white, heavily seeded, savoury inside that is used to make petha. The gourd is sliced into bite-sized pieces and then cured for a few hours in a solution of Calcium Hydroxide, locally known as Choona or Soon. After removing the gourd pieces from the Choona solution, they're boiled until soft, and then soaked in sugar syrup. The final candy has a sugar-crisp exterior and an almost moist, sticky interior with a firm, crunchy, and almost crystalline texture.

With growing demand and innovation, more varieties of the original preparation are available. Many flavoured variants are available, e.g. kesar petha, angoori petha etc. There are some other variations based on content, one with coconut mixed, another with some nuts put into it. Sometimes kewda essence is used to flavour petha.

The use of calcium hydroxide during preparation helps maintain the firmness of the ash gourd pieces during cooking and contributes to the characteristic texture of petha.

== History ==
Petha is said to have been in the subcontinent under various names like Oal and Oal ka Murabba in places like modern-day Jharkhand and Bihar. There is a legend that says that it originated in Mughal kitchens under Shah Jahan and was used to feed the workers constructing the Taj Mahal, but it's highly unlikely considering that there is no mention of Petha in cookbooks of Shah Jahan like Nuskha-e-Shahjahani. There are mentions of dishes resembling Petha before the Mughal people came to the subcontinent. Petha is also not like typical Mughal sweets and dishes which were rich in milk and mawa.

== See also ==
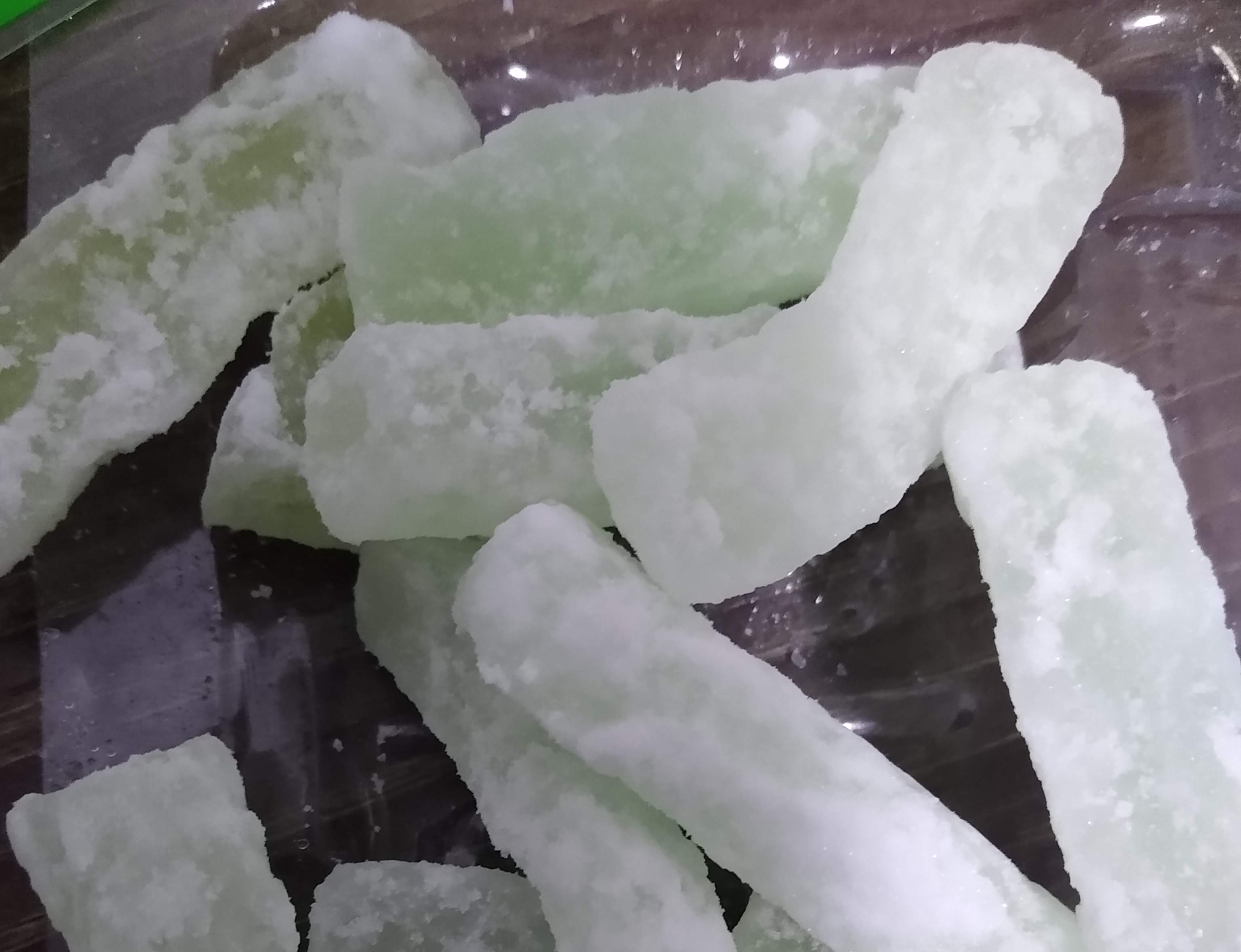
Rock sugar Winter Melon candy : Dōngguā táng 冬瓜糖

- Peda
- Mathura peda
- Dōngguā táng or Rock sugar Winter Melon candy
