= Mathura peda =

Indian Sweet dish

Mathura Peda
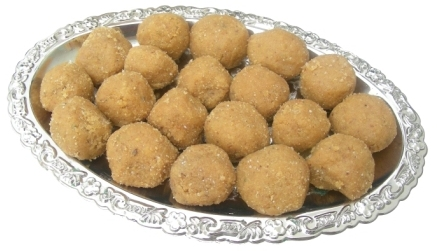
- Alternative names: Mathura ka Pedha or Pera
- Course: Dessert, Prasad
- Place of origin: India
- Region or state: Mathura, Uttar Pradesh
- Associated cuisine: Indian
- Main ingredients: Khoya, sugar, milk
- Variations: Mathura ke pede, Meva vati peda and export quality special peda

Mathura peda is an Indian sweet dish that originated from Mathura in Uttar Pradesh, India. In Central India, sweets prepared from mawa (khoya) are very popular and the peda is also a mawa sweet variety. Mathura peda is so famous in India that the term is often used in aphorism like Mathura ka peda au Chhattisgarh ka kheda means "(famous are) the peda sweet of Mathura and helmet in Chhattisgarh." Mathura acts as a brand name for peda sweet. While visiting Mathura, Mathura ke pede, Meva vati peda and export quality special peda are common souvenirs popular with visiting tourists.

== Popularity ==
Mathura peda is also popular outside India, where it is often sold at Indian sweet shops. Mathura peda’s regional popularity has likened it to other popular regional sweets such as Agra Peda and Mysore Pak.

== Mathura peda in folklore ==
Mathura's pede is a popular offering in Mathura, the birthplace of Krishna. To prepare Pedas fresh mawa, milk, sugar, and ghee are cooked together, and cardamom powder is added for taste. Pedas are considered an essential part of the Janmashtami celebration in India. Every year on this day, Pedas are prepared as Prasad or offering to Lord Krishna.

The taste of Mathura ke pede can be seen in Indian folklore also. "Mathura ke pede mohe lave, khilawe ji....."(he gives me the Mathura ka peda to eat) is a famous song among the Sand poojan (worship) songs in India.

== See also ==
- Agra petha
- Bikaneri bhujia
- Kurukshetra Prasadam (Channa Laddu)
- Peda
