= Khoya paneer =

North Indian cheese dish

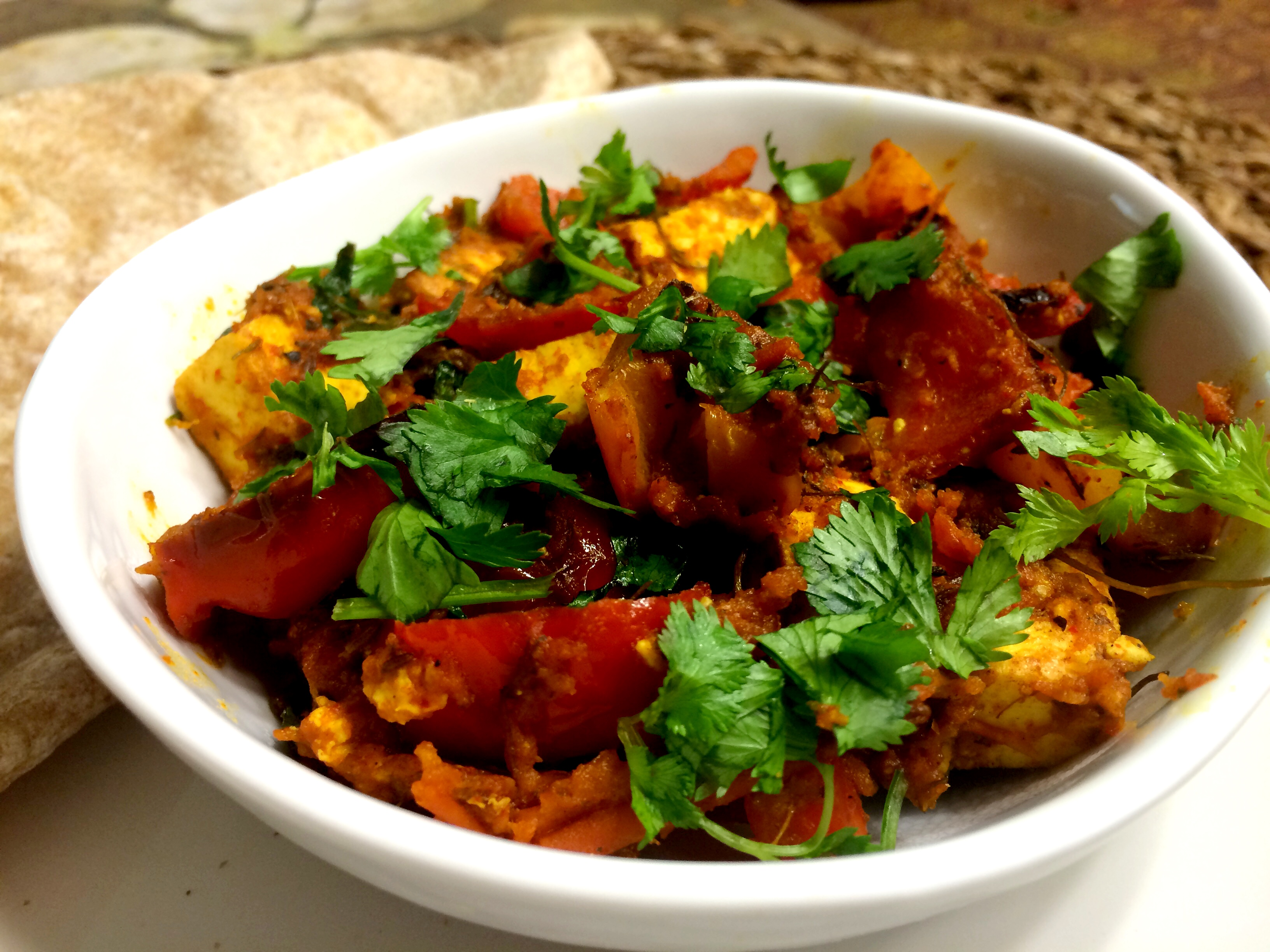
- Place of origin: India
- Main ingredients: Paneer, khoya, onions, garlic, ginger, tomato, Indian spices

Khoya paneer is a popular North Indian dish made with paneer (Indian cottage cheese), khoya (thickened milk), onion, garlic, ginger, tomato and Indian spices.

It is a gravy dish and usually tastes spicy. It is commonly available in restaurants and dhabas serving North Indian food. This dish is commonly eaten with Indian breads like roti and naan or rice.
