= Peda =

Indian confection

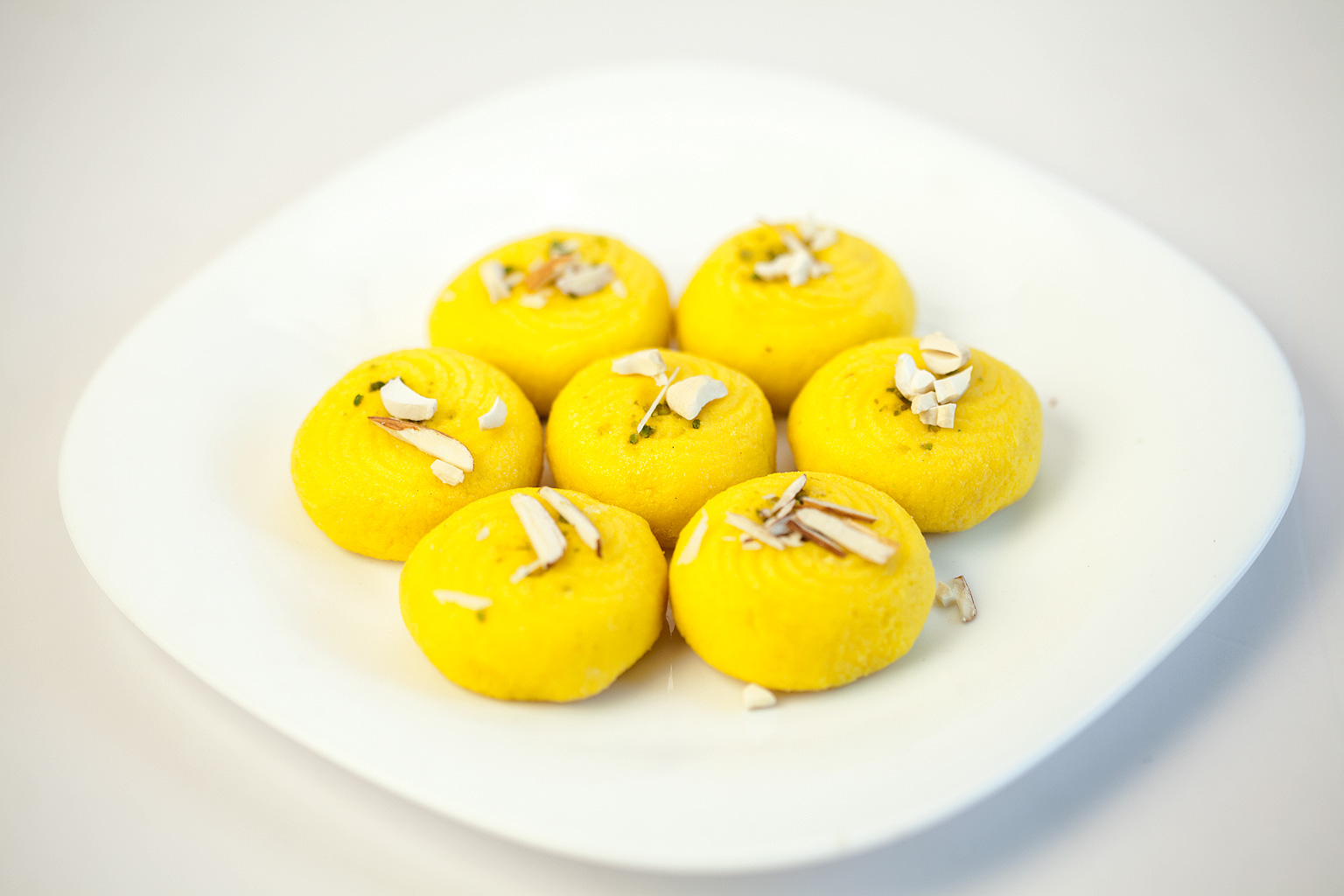
- Alternative names: Pedha, pera
- Course: Dessert, prasāda, sweet
- Place of origin: Indian subcontinent (Mathura, Uttar Pradesh, India)
- Region or state: Indian subcontinent, Mauritius, Fiji, southern and eastern Africa, the Caribbean, the Malay Peninsula
- Main ingredients: Khoya, sugar

Peda, pedha (pronounced [ˈpeːɽa]) or pera is an Indian sweet that originated in the city of Mathura, Uttar Pradesh, India. Traditionally prepared as thick, semi-soft round balls, its main ingredients are khoa, sugar and traditional flavourings including cardamom seeds. It is brown in colour. Variant spellings and names for the dessert include pedha, penda (in Gujarati) and pera and it is found in several varieties in north India.

== History and etymology ==
The word pda is derived from the Sanskrit word Piṇḍa or Piṇḍaka which refers to a lump of food and also a milk & flour-based sweet in the form of a lump. Piṇḍaka as a sweet finds mention in Ayurvedic & Pākaśāstra texts ranging from Charaka Samhita of the 4th century BCE to Bhojanakutūhala of 17th century CE. Charaka Samhita enlists piṇḍaka along with flour-based Indian sweets and describes them as heavy. Bhojanakutūhala describes the preparation of the sweet using milk and sugar with the use of spices like cardamom, cloves and pepper.

The sweet Doodh peda is mentioned in Sanskrit literature by different names like Dugdha Piṇḍaka and Kśīravațikă. For example, Ayurveda Mahodadhi by Acharya Sushena mentions its preparation in Kritanna Varga. Another Ayurvedic treatise Brhadyogatarangini describes Kśīravați sweet which is presently called doodh peda.

Modern variations of pedas originated in the city of Mathura in present-day Uttar Pradesh. The Mathura peda is the characteristic variety of the city. From Uttar Pradesh, the pedas spread to many parts of the Indian subcontinent. Thakur Ram Ratan Singh of Lucknow who migrated to Dharwad (in the present-day Karnataka) in the 1850s introduced pedas there. This distinct variety is now famous as the Dharwad pedha. Kandi pedha from Satara in Maharashtra is another variety of peda. Dood peda, made famous by the Nandini Milk Co-operative in Karnataka, is another popular variety.

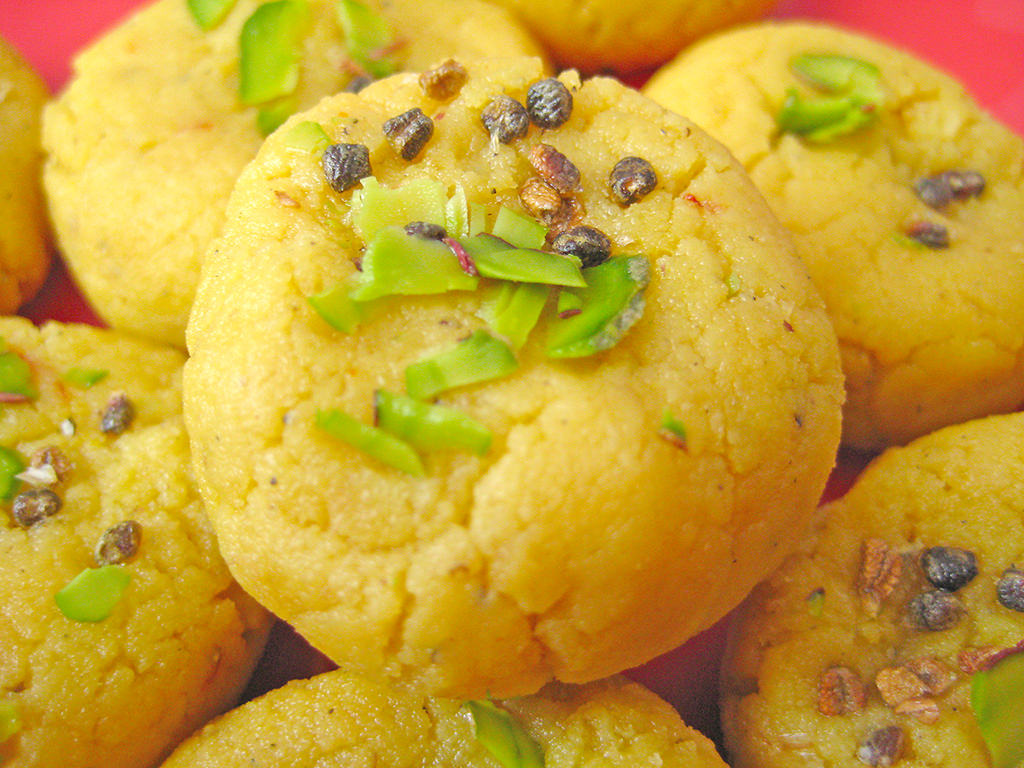
Kesar peda with Garnishing of Pistachio and Cardamom

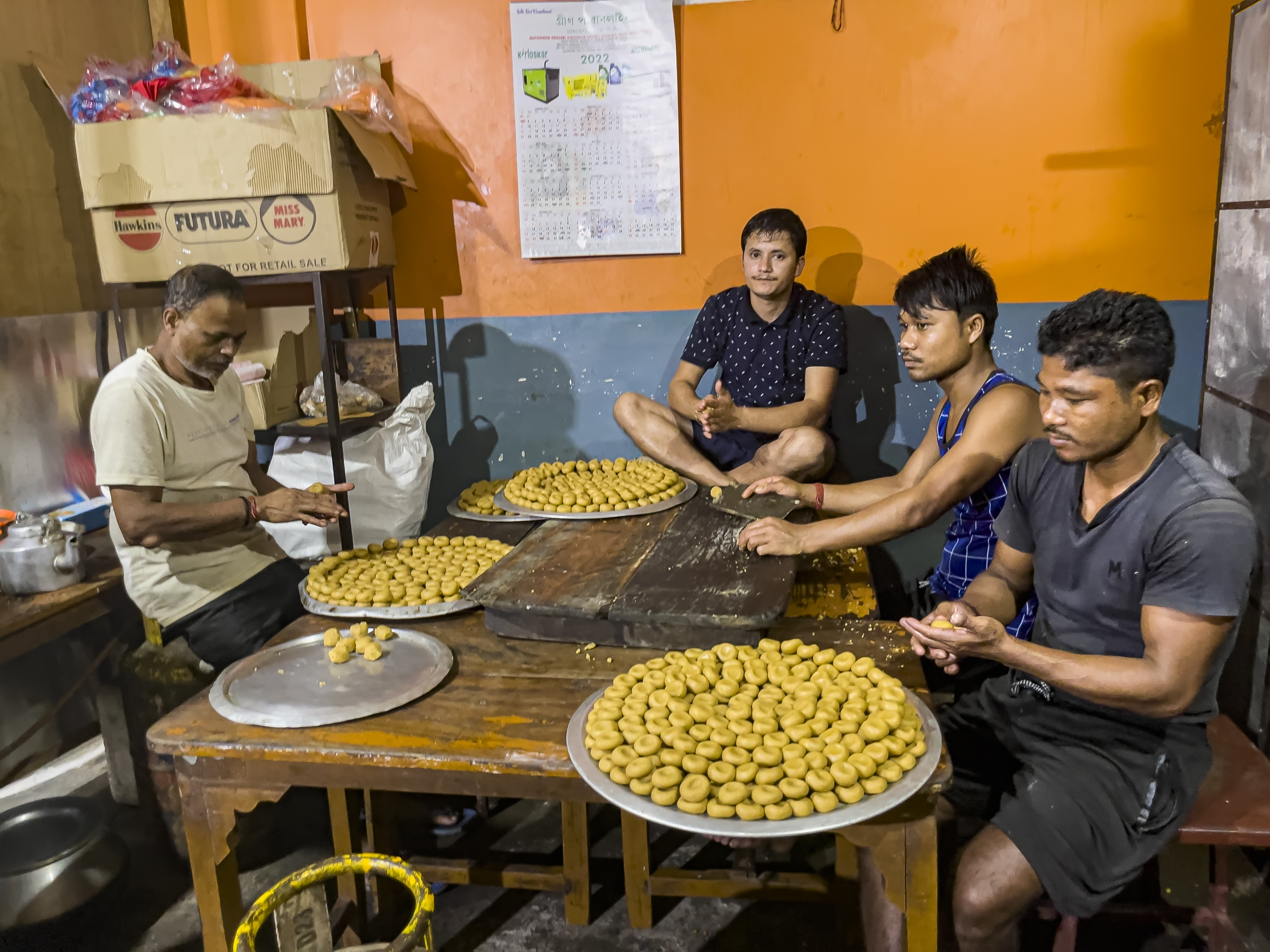
Peda Makers at Bokakhat, Assam, India. Bokakhat is famous for its peda industry.

== Nutrition ==
The calorie content of a peda can vary depending on the size, ingredients, and method of preparation. However, on average, a single peda can contain around 40-90 calories. It also has a good amount of protein, fat, sucrose and lactose.

== Shelf life and storage ==
Pedas have a higher Shelf-life compared to few other milk-based sweets such as the rasgulla or the kalakand (last less than 2 days with refrigeration). It is attributed to their high sugar and lower moisture content. It usually lasts 3 days without refrigeration. In response to this challenge, techniques like vacuum and smart packing, adding anti-oxidants, and temperature control can increase the shelf-life of pedas.

== Varieties ==
Each region has its own method of preparation. Some of the most popular types of peda are Doodh peda/Mathura peda from Uttar Pradesh, Kunthalgiri peda and Dharwad peda from Karnataka, and Lal peda from Eastern Uttar Pradesh. In addition, there are variations with respect to flavor and texture- such as Plain peda, Kesar peda, and Brown peda. To embrace a healthier, low-fat lifestyle, there are now new varieties of pedas available, including hazelnut and walnut flavored options. Other dairy products that share similarities with peda are Kunda, Thabdi, Bal mithai, and Kalakand. While pedas are commonly found in most sweet stores throughout India, there are also large-scale dairy producers such as Amul, Nandini and Mother Dairy that are involved in the production of pedas.

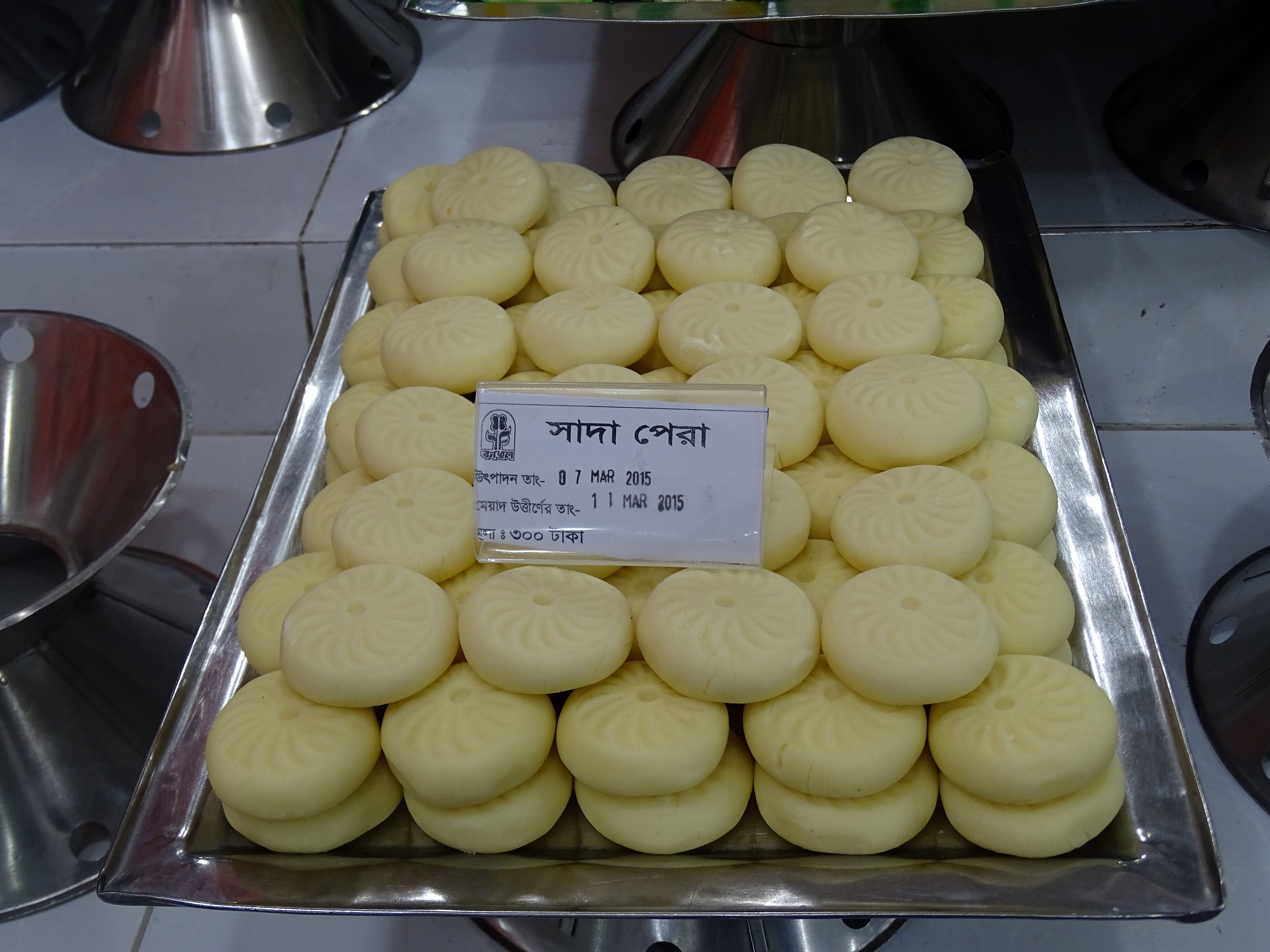
Doodh peda

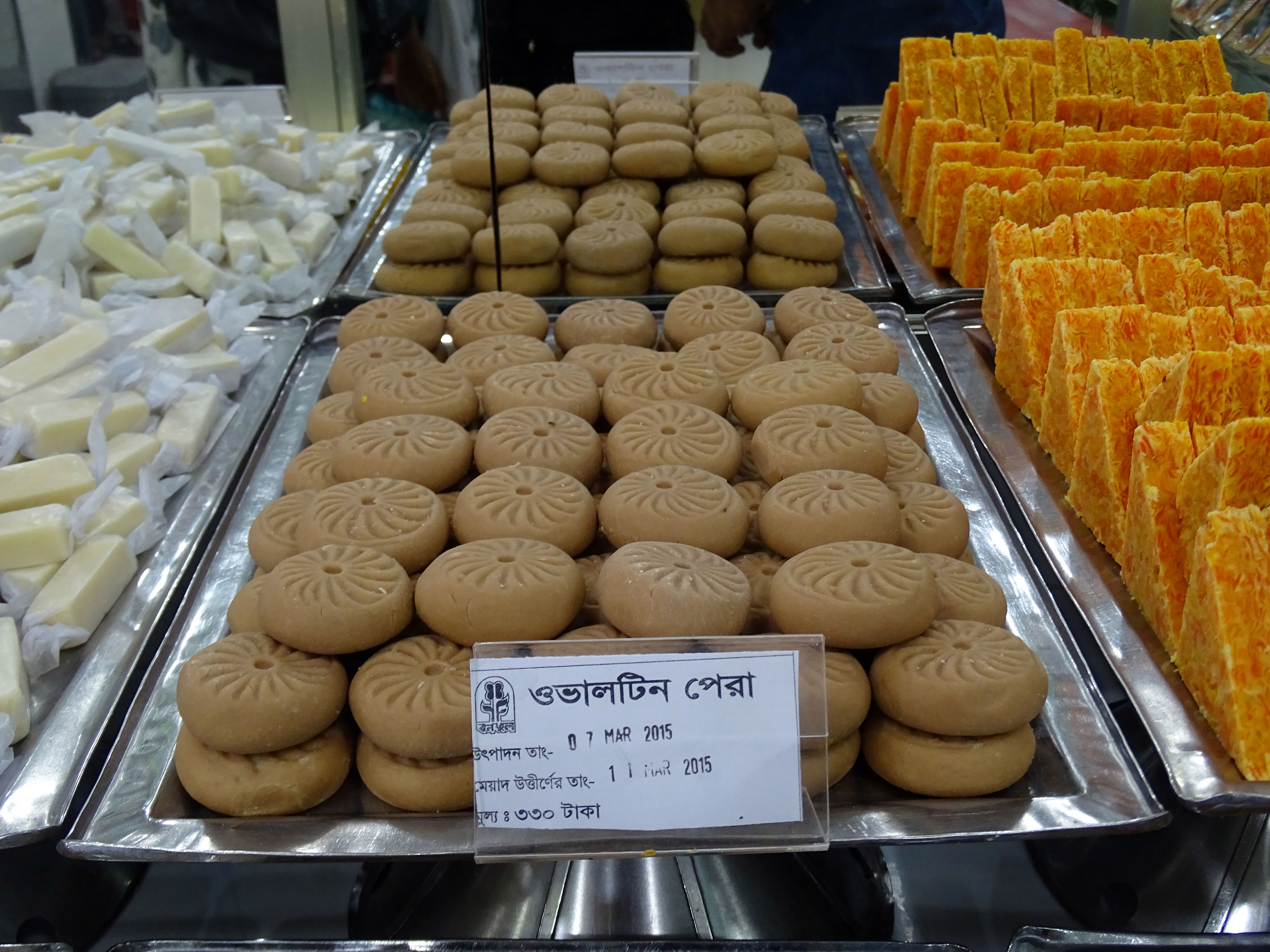
Lal peda

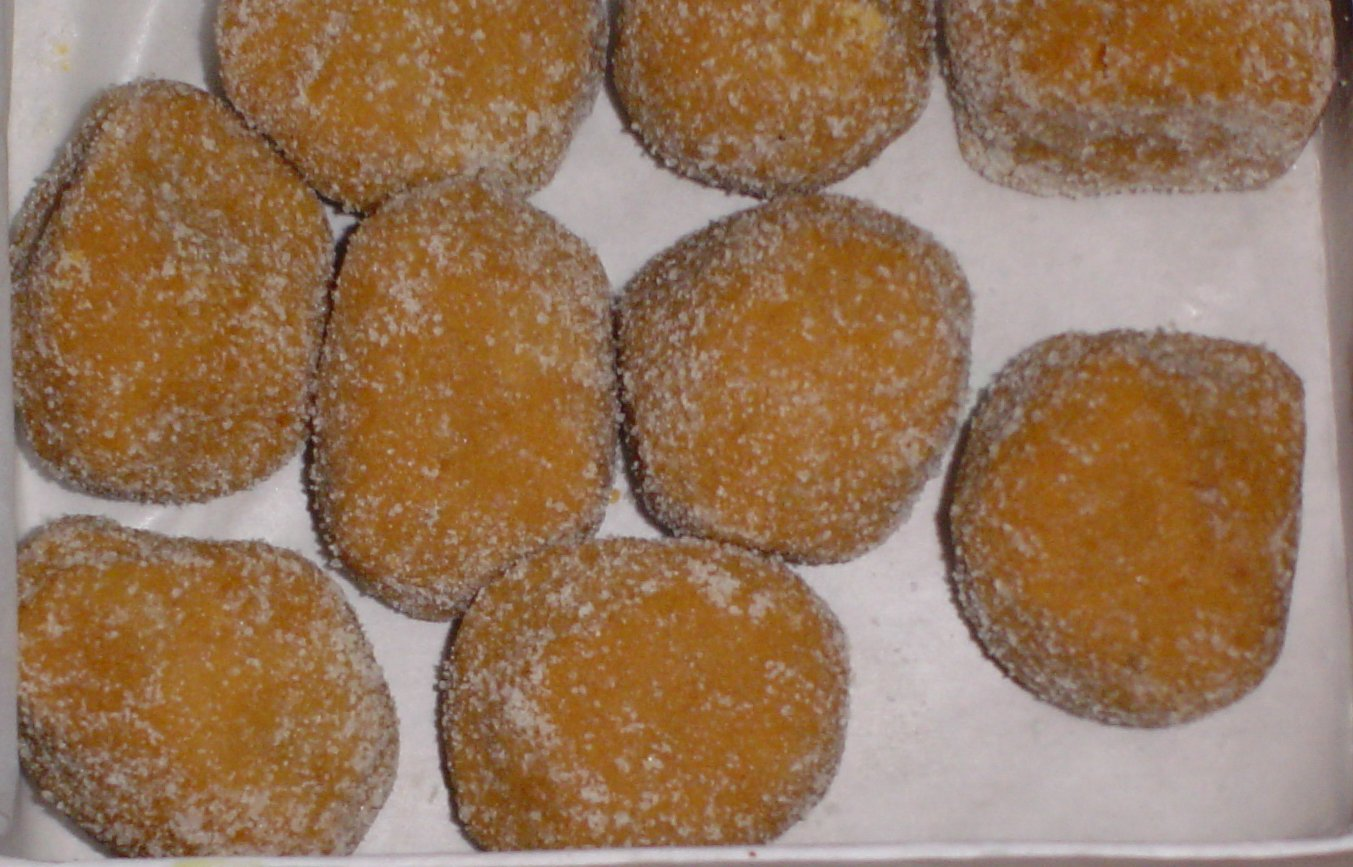
Dharwad peda

== Consumption customs ==
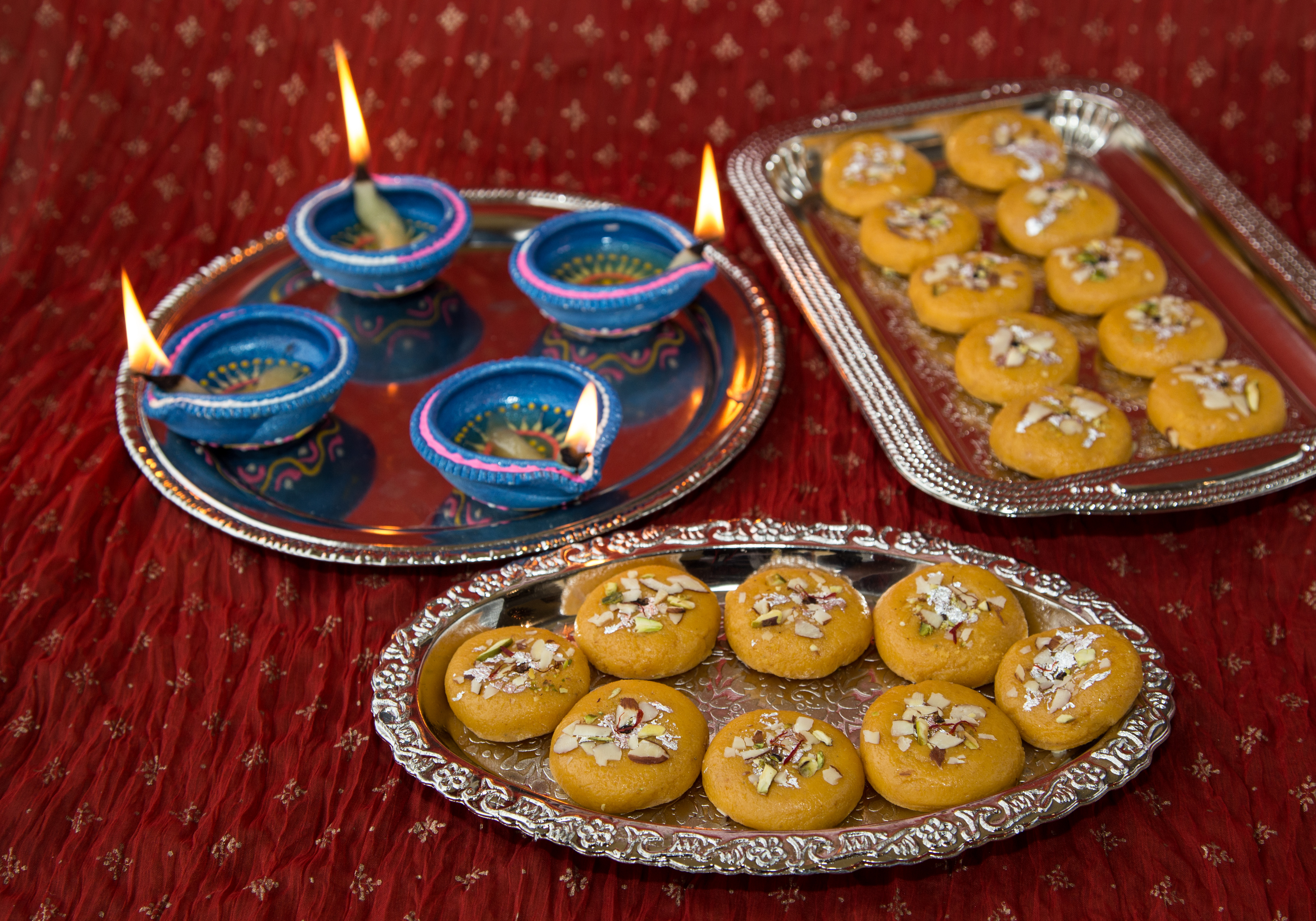
Pedas during Diwali

It is a dessert consumed on various occasions such as festivals like Ganesh Chaturthi, Diwali, Rakhsha Bandhan, baby arrivals or weddings. It is distributed especially when a boy child is born. It is also one of the most popular sweets offered to Krishna during Krishna Janmashtami, the festival that celebrates the birth of Krishna.

== In religion ==
As with laddus, pedas are sometimes used as prasadam in religious services.

It is believed to be Krishna’s favourite sweet and is widely consumed during Krishna Janmashtami. There is a popular story that has been passed down for ages of how peda was first made. Krishna’s mother Yashoda forgot to turn off the oven the milk was boiling on. By the time she remembered it, the milk had thickened considerably. To salvage it, she decided to add sugar and give it to Krishna. It is believed that Krishna liked it so much that the tradition of offering peda to Krishna began in Mathura, the birthplace of Krishna.
