= Gujhia =

Indian sweet dish

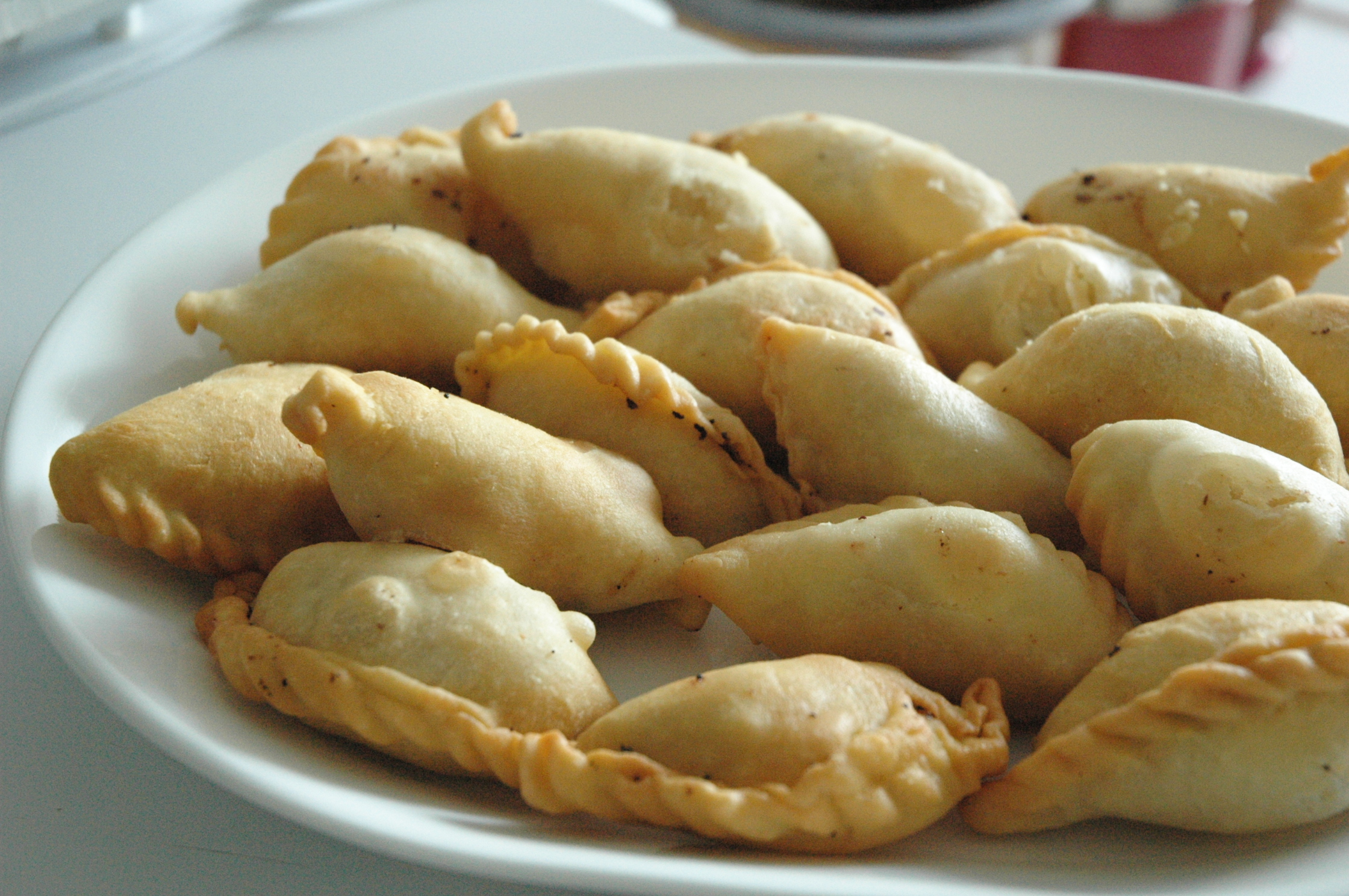
- Alternative names: Chandrakala are half-moon-shaped, while the circular discs are suryakala
- Type: Dumpling
- Course: Dessert
- Place of origin: Indian subcontinent
- Region or state: Indian subcontinent
- Main ingredients: Suji, maida flour, wheat flour, khoa, coconut, raisins, crushed almonds, walnuts, cashews, pistachios

Gujhia, also known as gujiya, gujia, gughara, edakiya, purukiya, karanji, kajjikayalu, kadubu, somas, or karjikayi, is a sweet, deep-fried pastry that is a popular dessert in the Indian subcontinent.

== Etymology ==
The earliest mention of gujiya dates back to the 13th century, when a jaggery-honey mixture was covered with wheat flour and was sun-dried. The preparation method of a typical gujiya/pedakiya is rather similar to that of a samosa, but the gujiya/padakiya looks like an empanada. Shaped like a half moon, the gujiya or pedakiya is filled with a sweet mixture of grated and roasted dried fruits, khoa, grated coconut, and a hint of suji to lend it a grainy texture.

== Preparation ==
Gujhia is made by mixing suji (semolina) with maida (all-purpose flour), which is stuffed with a mixture of sweetened khoa (milk solids, also called mawa), powdered sugar, coconut and dried fruits like raisins, crushed almonds, walnuts, cashews, and pistachios. The dumplings are then fried in ghee to give them a crispy texture.

Gujhias are particularly popular in the Uttar Pradesh, Rajasthan, Gujarat, and Bihar & Bhojpuri regions of India, where they are prepared during Chhath, Holi and Diwali festivities. It's called 𑂣𑂘𑂺𑂍𑂱𑂨𑂰 (Padakiya) in Bhojpuri language.

In Bihar, dry ones are called padakiya and are particularly eaten during Chhath. There are two types of padakiya made in Bihar: one with suji/rawa (semolina) and another with khoa. In suji padakiya, suji is roasted in ghee with sugar, almonds, cardamom, raisins, and other nuts and then deep-fried in ghee. In khoa pedakiya, pure khoa is mixed with nuts and sugar and then deep-fried.

Similar dishes are found in several regional cuisines in India, such as ghughra (Gujarati) in Gujarat and karanji (Marathi) in Maharashtra. Chandrakala are half-moon shaped, while the circular discs are suryakala(Tamil) in Tamil Nadu, garijalu (Telugu) in Telangana, kajjikayalu(కజ్జికాయలు) (Telugu) in Andhra Pradesh, and karjikayi or karigadubu (Kannada) in Karnataka. All of these dishes are fried sweet dumplings made of wheat flour and stuffed with dry or moist coconut.

In Goa, nevri or neuri (plural neureo) is a similar sweet prepared on the occasion of their festivals, such as Ganesh Chaturthi for Hindus and Christmas for Christians.
