= Taxation in Ethiopia =

Ethiopia has a long history of taxing its population. As of 2002, reforms have changed the way the tax system works in the nation; these reforms have aimed to centralize tax authority. Currently the nation's federal government lobbies many different types of taxes on its population; these taxes include income taxes on four main schedules, property taxes, and value added taxes (VAT).

== History ==
As one of the longest standing centralized independent nations in Africa, Ethiopia has a long history of levying taxes against its population. After the fall of the Emperor and the rise of the Derg government, much of the tax system was revamped under the new socialist system. In 1976, agricultural and rural land taxes were replaced by a land-use fee and a new agriculture tax. Ethiopia underwent major tax reform in the 1990s. As a result, the tax system was overhauled alongside much of the public finance system. The Ethiopian reforms were considered some of the most successful on the continent. Challenges abounded during the reforms, as Ethiopian law did not allow subnational governments to set their own tax rates, leading to an unwieldy tax system that required all decisions to be made from the federal level. Additional reforms were passed in 2002 as Ethiopia continued the shift to a market system. These reforms included changes to outdated and ineffective trade and domestic tax law.

However, the Ethiopian economy underwent a significant transition - it became more and more reliant on its service industry. More than half of the nation's GDP came from agriculture in 2004/05, while the service sector accounted for 35%. In the next decade, the service sector began growing in comparison to the agricultural sector, accounting for the largest share of the GDP in 2015/16. Alongside these economic changes, an ambitious 10-year development plan was proposed. In order to achieve its goals, as well as to successfully address new economic changes, Ethiopia aims towards modernizing its taxation system in order to enhance its leverage over resources. In 2016, the Federal Tax Administration Proclamation was issued, introducing new tax reforms. The most notable of those reforms are: the reassignment of the Ethiopian Revenues and Customs Authority, consequently turning into the Ministry of Revenues; the establishment Tax Appeal Commission, with the goal of evaluating appeals; the increase in tax brackets, alongside other reforms addressing the issues of inflation and economic changes. Furthermore, several exemptions have been introduced on customs duty, making it easier to trade internationally. Much like to other countries in the region, Ethiopia introduced a set of policy changes regarding economic struggles caused by COVID-19 - this set of changes was mostly based on tax relief in the form of exemptions and helpful loss carryforward deals. However, these changes have yet to address the fall in the tax-to-GDP ratio, which fell from 12.4% (2014/15) to 10% (2018/19), making the 10-year plan harder to realize.

== The Structure of Taxation ==
The Ethiopian tax system is conditioned by the nature of its federal structure - the powers to levy and collect taxes are split between the states and the federal government, and can either be shared or exclusive. The federal government exclusively conducts: import and export taxes and tariffs, income taxes on civil servants, taxes on publicly-owned companies, taxes on lottery winnings, taxes on transportation services (exempting regional transport), taxes on properties owned by the federal government, as well as taxes on monopolies. The regional states exclusively conduct: taxes on the income of farmers, income taxes from transportation on the respective regions, income taxes of mining services, income taxes/sales taxes of traders who conduct trade on regional territories, taxes on rent of properties, taxes on companies owned by the regional states, various royalties and fees collected for the use of terrain/waters/forests. Both the federal government and the regional states conduct: taxes on companies that are cooperatively owned, taxes on foreign companies that have large-scale operations that stretch throughout several regional states.

Although the federal government and the regional states hold different duties, the greater part of taxes is collected by the federal government (e.g., in 2018/19, the federal government collected around 72% of the total tax revenue).

== Categories of Taxation ==
=== Definitions of Income ===
Ethiopia divides its types of income into five schedules: A, B, C, D and E.

These schedules signify: A - taxation from employment, B - taxation from rent of land and buildings, C - taxation from taxation of income from business, professional and vocational occupations, lumbering, and interest, D - other direct taxes, E - exempt incomes.

==== Schedule "A" - Taxation from employment. ====
As opposed to other countries which collect tax based on annual earnings, schedule A tax is based on monthly earnings of employees, meaning that the tax varies based on the changes in the monthly income of employees. Hence, self-employed workers usually pay disproportionately higher taxes as opposed to those who receive monthly salaries. These taxes are usually paid through PAYE.

Tax Rates for Schedule "A" Income (in Birr)
| Employment Income (per month) | Tax Rate Deductions |
| 0 - 600 | 0% |
| 601 - 1,650 | 10% |
| 1,651 - 3,200 | 15% |
| 3,201 - 5,250 | 20% |
| 5,251 - 7,800 | 25% |
| 7,801 - 10,900 | 30% |
| over 10,900 | 35% |

1500

==== Schedule "B" - Taxation from rent of land and buildings. ====
As opposed to the taxes on employment income, taxation from rent is levied on a yearly basis.

Tax Rates for Schedule "B" Income (in Birr)
| Rental Income (per year) | Tax Rate |
| 0 - 7,200 | 0% |
| 7,201 - 10,900 | 10% |
| 19,801 - 38,400 | 15% |
| 38,401 - 63,000 | 20% |
| 63,001 - 93,600 | 25% |
| 93,601 - 130,800 | 30% |
| over 130,800 | 35% |

==== Schedule "C" - Taxation from taxation of income from business, professional and vocational occupations, lumbering, and interest. ====
Tax Rates for Schedule "C" Income (in Birr)
| Business Income (per year) | Tax Rate |
| 0 - 7,200 | 0% |
| 7,200 - 19,800 | 10% |
| 19,801 - 38,400 | 15% |
| 38,401 - 63,000 | 20% |
| 63,001 - 93,600 | 25% |
| 93,601 - 130,800 | 30% |
| over 130,800 | 35% |

==== Schedule "D" - Taxation from agricultural activities. ====
Other direct taxes include taxes on dividends, lotteries, undistributed profit, income of non-resident entertainers, repatriated profit, royalties, interest income, rural land use fee, urban land leases etc. The extent of these taxes varies, but they are usually flat rates on the gross amount of income, or they vary based on the size of the taxed assets.

Schedule "E" - Exempt incomes

Certain incomes sources are excluded from previously mentioned categories, such as: travel expenses (including transportation costs, food and accommodation), costs of medical treatment which are covered by the employer, as well as hardship allowances.

=== Value Added Tax (VAT) ===
The value-added tax was originally introduced in 1993, only to be abolished 9 years later, at the end of 2002. As of 2003, after the tax reform, Ethiopia imposed a value added tax on all goods produced in the nation and all imported goods and services not exempt; the tax is rated at 15% on every transaction at each stage of manufacturing. VAT exemptions and zero rates are also often applied. Some of the goods which the VAT exemptions apply to are: real estate services, humanitarian aid, religious and cultural services, certain financial services, transportation, utilities, mosquito nets, etc. Zero rates are only applied to exports, gold that is supplied to the National Bank of Ethiopia and to international transportation.

=== Stamp Duty ===
Ethiopia imposes a stamp duty on legal documents in the country. Items taxed under Stamp Duty include: memorandum, bonds, contract agreements, security deeds, collective agreement, contract of employment, leases, notarial acts, power of attorney, and documents of title to property. Depending on the type of instrument the rates of Stamp Duty vary, ranging from flat rates to percentage of the valuations.

Applicable stamp duty rates for legal, commercial and financial instruments
| Instrument description | Tax rate |
| Memorandum and articles of association of any business | Flat rate of: ETB 350 upon first execution ETB 100 upon any subsequent execution |
| Memorandum and articles of association of cooperatives | Flat rate of: ETB 35 upon first execution ETB 10 upon any subsequent execution |
| Award | 1% of the determinable value; or ETB 35 on any undeterminable value |
| Bonds | 1% of value of bond |
| Warehouse bonds | 1% of value of bond |
| Security deeds | 1% of value of security deed |
| Contractor agreements and memoranda thereof | A flat rate of ETB 5 |
| Collective agreement | 1% of value of collective agreement |
| Contract of employment | 1% of salary |
| Lease, including sub-lease and transfer of similar rights | 0.5% of the value |
| Notarial act | Flat rate of ETB 5 |
| Power of attorney | Flat rate of ETB 35 |
| Register title to property | 2% of the value of the property |

Stamp duties are not obligatory in cases when: goods are imported under an import license, when goods are exempted by an international agreement or an agreement made by the government, as well as in cases when the Ministry of Revenue permits a discretionary exemption for good cause.

=== Other Taxes ===
In addition to income taxes and value added tax, Ethiopia also imposes a multitude of other niche taxes. Fossil fuel and food taxes are levied, with certain studies claiming their effects are regressive.

== Revenue ==
As of 2018/19, Ethiopian tax revenue came in at 268.5 billion Birr. The majority of income comes from sales/VAT taxes on trade, goods and services, with business taxation coming in second.

=== Foreign Aid ===
Ethiopia's tax revenue is three times as large as the amount it receives in foreign aid; studies have shown that "aid in Ethiopia positively affects tax revenues, particularly through technical assistance and policy advice rather than conditionality."

=== Distribution of Tax Revenues ===
General government tax revenue in 2018/19 (million ETB and %)
| Tax Type | Revenue in million ETB | Share of total tax revenue |
|---|---|---|
| Domestic direct tax | 115,858 | 43.2% |
| Employment income tax | 41,202 | 15.3% |
| Rental income tax | 2,138 | 0.8% |
| Corporate business income tax | 44,668 | 16.6% |
| Personal business income tax | 14,738 | 5.5% |
| Other domestic direct tax | 13,111 | 4.9% |
| Domestic indirect tax | 77,772 | 29.0% |
| VAT on local goods & services | 61,221 | 22.8% |
| Excise tax on local goods | 10,055 | 3.7% |
| Turnover tax (TOT) | 3,666 | 1.4% |
| Other domestic indirect tax | 2,830 | 1.1% |
| Trade tax | 74,827 | 27.9% |
| Customs duty | 24,882 | 9.3% |
| Excise on imports | 7,655 | 2.9% |
| VAT on imports | 27,889 | 10.4% |
| Surtax | 14,397 | 5.4% |
| Other trade tax | 3 | 0.0% |
| Total tax revenue | 268,457 | 100.0% |

== Taxation Compliance ==
As Ethiopia is a very large and diverse country, it faces issues implementing taxation. Only 57% of Ethiopian tax payers are considered "high" compliance taxpayers; high compliance is correlated with level of education, simplicity of tax preparation, and the view of government expenditures. The Ethiopian tax system has faced criticism for its perceived failures to redistribute income, and that taxation is not felt equally among income groups. The system has also faces criticism from the taxpayers themselves, labeling it as "emotionally draining, includes hours of waiting, and being humiliated and threatened by tax officials." This attitude is on par with rising levels of dissatisfaction with Ethiopian institutions.

== Business Taxation ==
Small businesses in Ethiopia are taxed differently than individuals. Businesses are required to pay: "business income tax, windfall income tax, other income tax, turnover tax and excise tax." Over 20% of all tax revenue in Ethiopia is derived from business profit tax, and 62% of all direct taxes consist of business taxation. Tax burden in Ethiopia has been shown to fall unequally among firm sizes; a study from 2019 found that "small firms face the highest tax burden, the largest firms still pay more than middle‐sized firms do." While the tax rate for businesses is staggered through income thresholds, the effective tax rates for firms in Ethiopia range from over 25% for smaller businesses, down to below 10% for medium businesses, and 13% for large businesses.
