= Khoa =

Indian dairy food

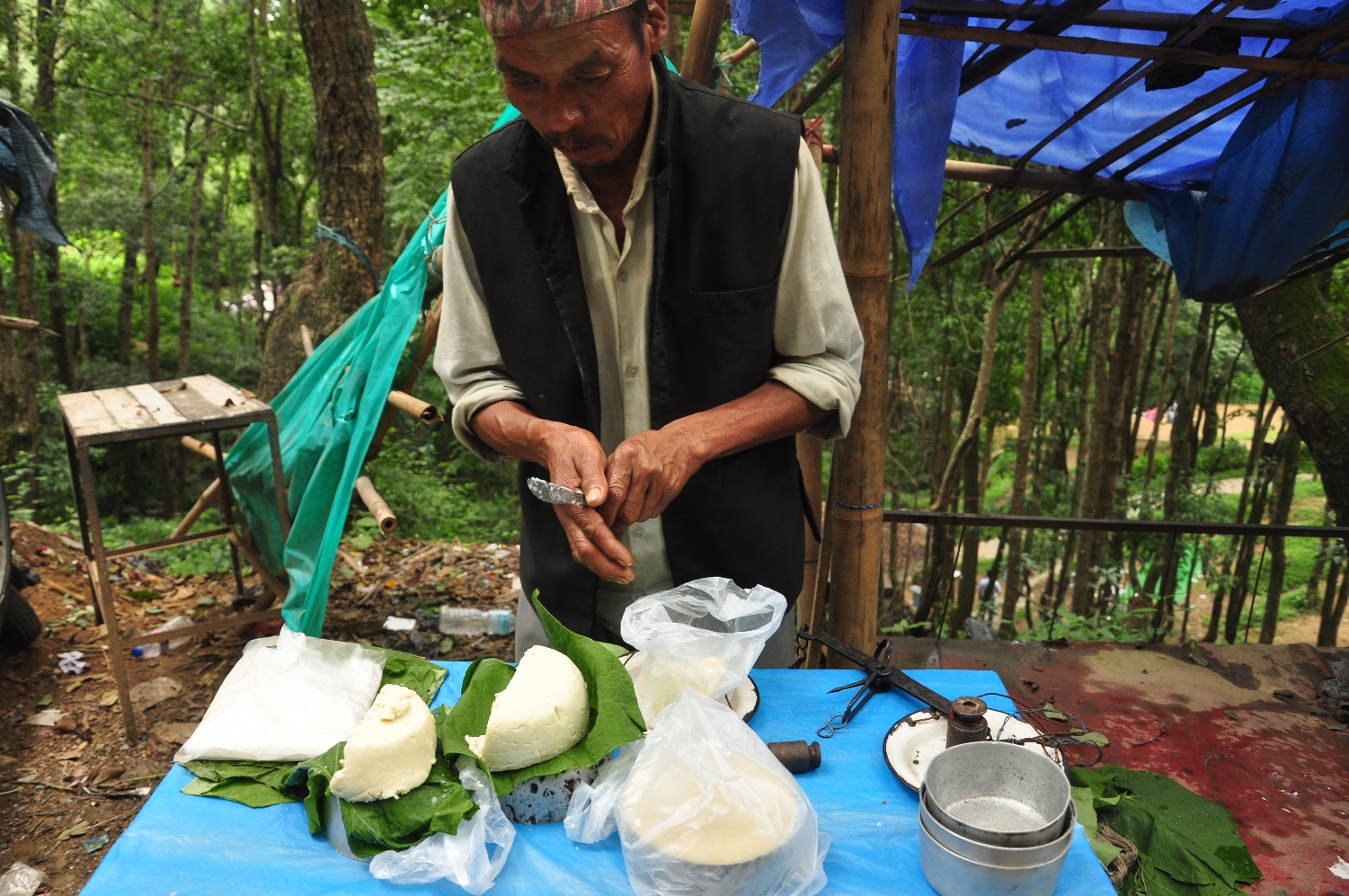
- Khoa vendor in Nepal
- Alternative names: Khoya, khowa, teeyagaundi mawa
- Type: Cheese
- Course: Dessert, main ingredient for sweets
- Place of origin: Indian subcontinent
- Region or state: South Asia (India, Nepal, Pakistan)
- Associated cuisine: Indian, Nepalese, Pakistani
- Main ingredients: Whole milk
- Variations: Batti, chikna, daanedaar, pindi, dhap
- Food energy (per serving): Approximately 1318 kJ (315 kcal) per 100 g

Khoa, khoya, khowa or mawa is a soft cheese widely used in South Asian cuisine, encompassing India, Nepal, and Pakistan. It is made of either dried whole milk or milk thickened by heating in an open iron pan. It is lower in moisture than typical fresh cheeses such as ricotta. It is made from whole milk instead of whey.

== Preparation ==
A concentration of milk to one-fifth volume is normal in the production of khoa. Khoa is used as the base for a wide variety of Indian sweets. About 600,000 metric tons are produced annually in India. Khoa is made from both cow and water buffalo milk. Khoa is made by simmering full-fat milk in a large, shallow iron pan for several hours over a medium fire. The gradual evaporation of its water content leaves only the milk solids. The ideal temperature to avoid scorching is about 80 °C (180 °F). Another quick way of making khoa is to add full-fat milk powder to skimmed milk and mix and heat it until it becomes thick. This may, however, not have the same characteristics as traditionally made khoa.

Khoa is normally white or pale yellow. If prepared in the winter, it may be saved for use in the summer, and may acquire a green tinge and grainier texture from a harmless surface mould. This is called hariyali (green khoa) and is used in recipes where the khoa is thoroughly cooked, e.g., gulab jamun. With the advent of refrigeration, the production of hariyali is rare.

== Types ==
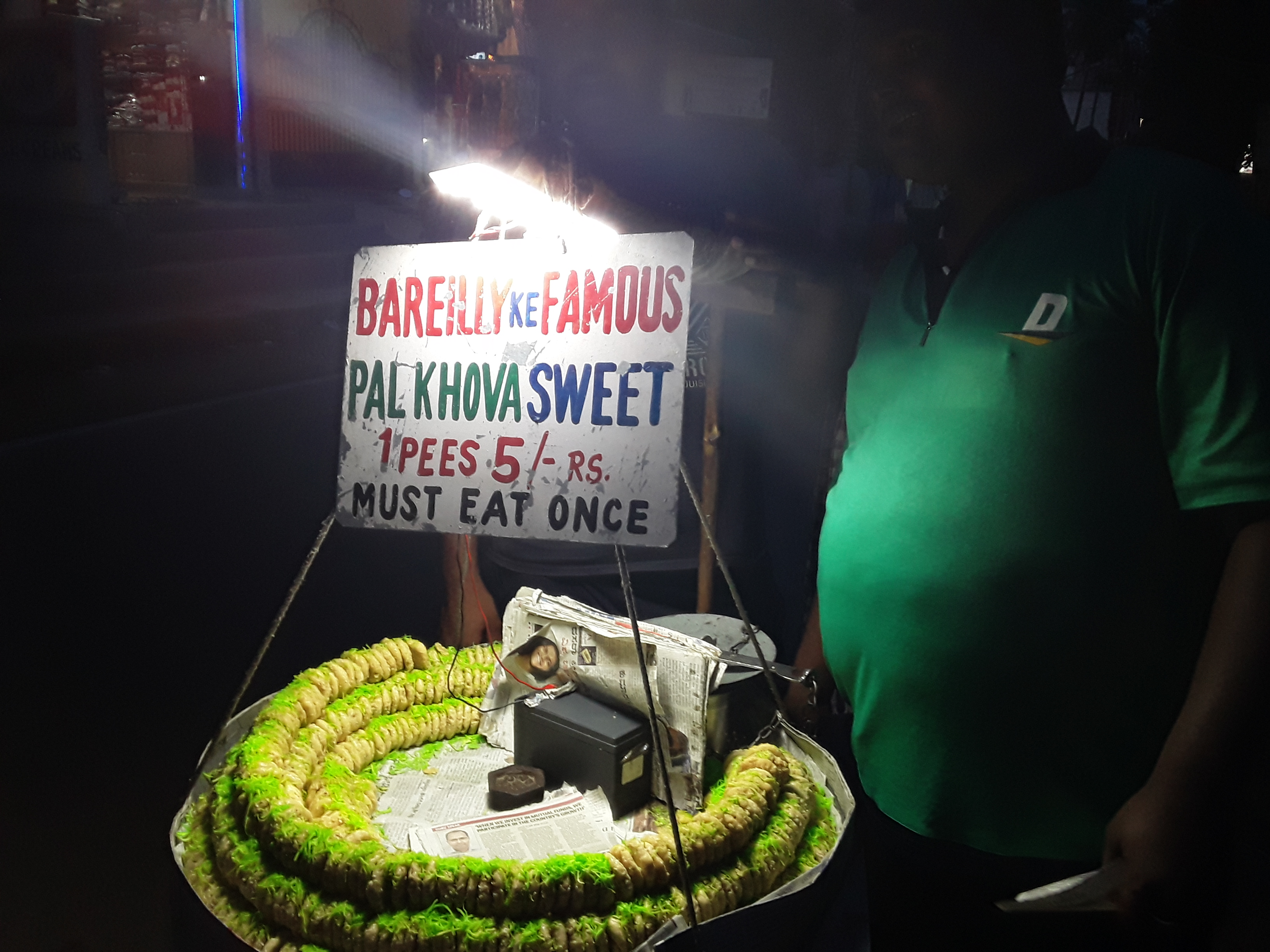
Milk Khoa in Mysore, India

Khoa is classified into different types, based on moisture content. Different types of khoa are used for different preparations.

- Batti, meaning "rock", has 20% moisture by weight and is the hardest of the three types; it can be grated like cheese. It can be aged for up to a year, during which it develops a unique aroma and a mouldy outer surface.
- Chikna ("slippery" or "squishy") khoa has 50% moisture.
- Daanedaar is a grainy variety. The milk is coagulated with an acid during the simmering; it has a moderate moisture content. It is used for preparing kalakand, gourd barfi and other sweets.
- Pindi, dry khoa, is used for preparing barfi and peda.
- Dhap, a less dried version, is used for preparing gulab jamun and pantua.

== Uses ==
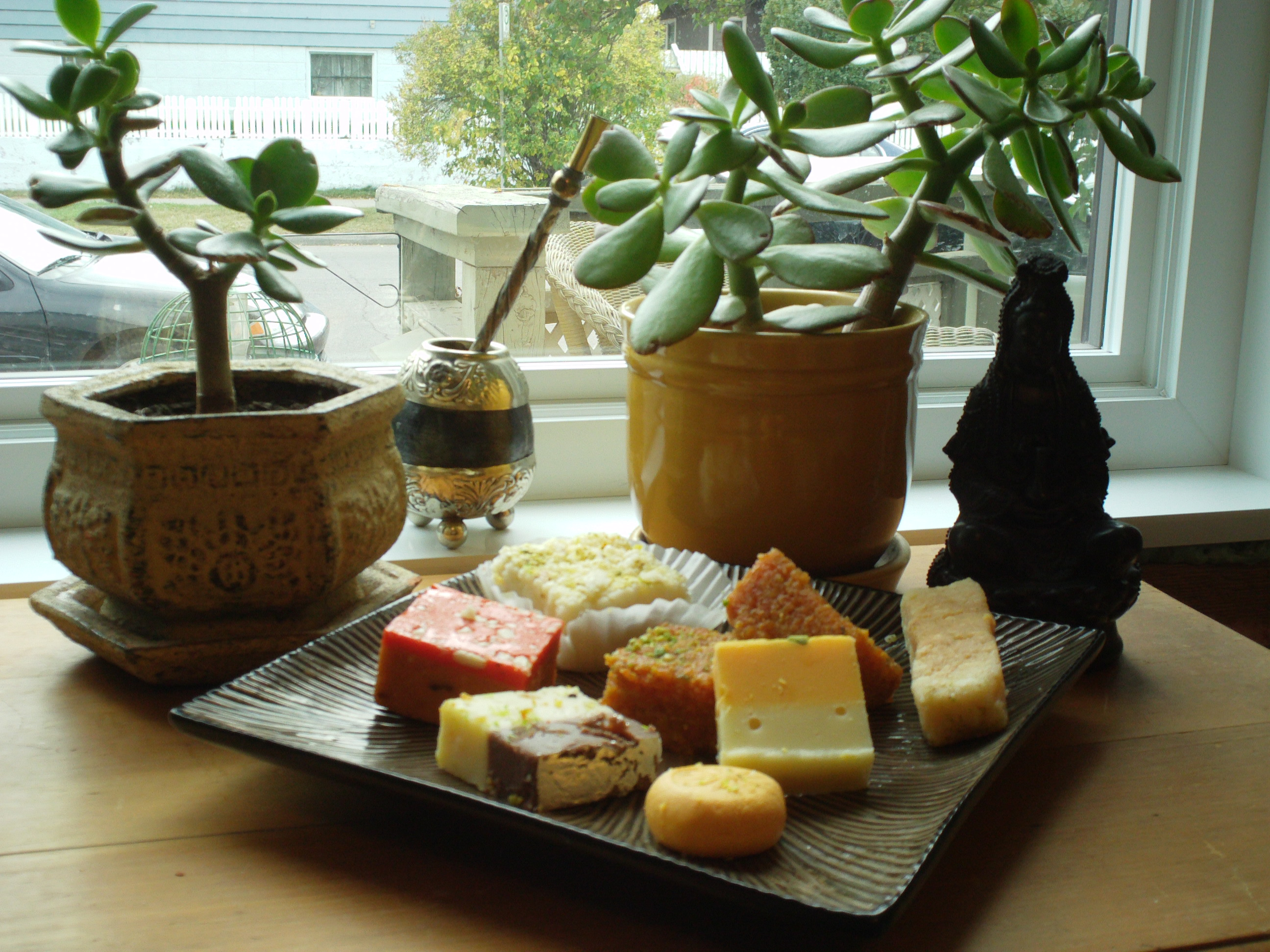
Assortment of mithai: pedha, barfi and sandesh made of khoa, sugar and various flavorings, in Mumbai, India

Khoa is used in various types of sweets:

- Pedha is sweetened khoa formed into balls or thick disks (like patties) with flavourings such as saffron or cardamom added.
- Gulab jamun, a very common Indian sweet, consists of a round ball made from khoa and then deep-fried and soaked in rose-flavoured sugar or honey syrup.
- Jalebi from Jabalpur is made from Khoa.
- Barfi (or burfi) is also flavoured, but khoa is not the only ingredient. Typically, another ingredient, such as thickened fruit pulp or coconut shavings, is added to khoa and slow-cooked until the moisture evaporates sufficiently to give the consistency of fudge, so it can be flattened and cut into rectangles, parallelograms or diamond shapes.
- Gujia, a sweet, fried dumpling stuffed with khoa and nuts, is very commonly prepared during Holi.
- Halwa is essentially a fudge made by adding khoa to wheat starch or cornstarch and sugar syrup to give a dairy-like taste and texture and act as a thickening agent. Most halwa recipes, however, omit the khoa, relying only on starch and sugar plus slivered nuts, spices such as cardamom or saffron, and flavorings such as rose water and screwpine.
- Main course north Indian dishes like khoya paneer, makhmali kofte and khoya matar.
- Naan roti stuffed with khoa is a specialty of the bakers of Bangalore.

== See also ==
- Chhena – Type of cheese curds originating in India
- List of water buffalo cheeses
