= List of condiments =

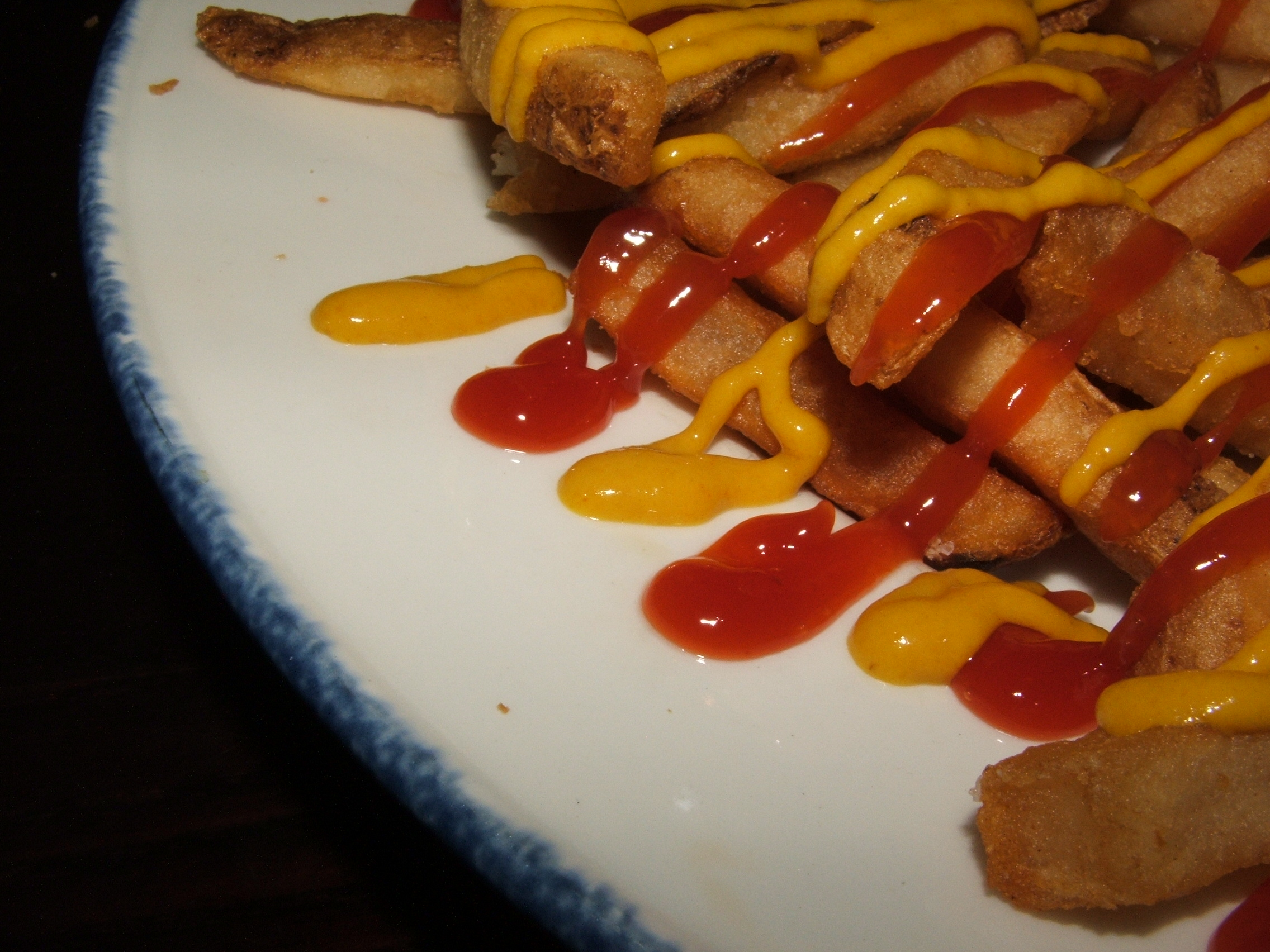
Ketchup and mustard on fries

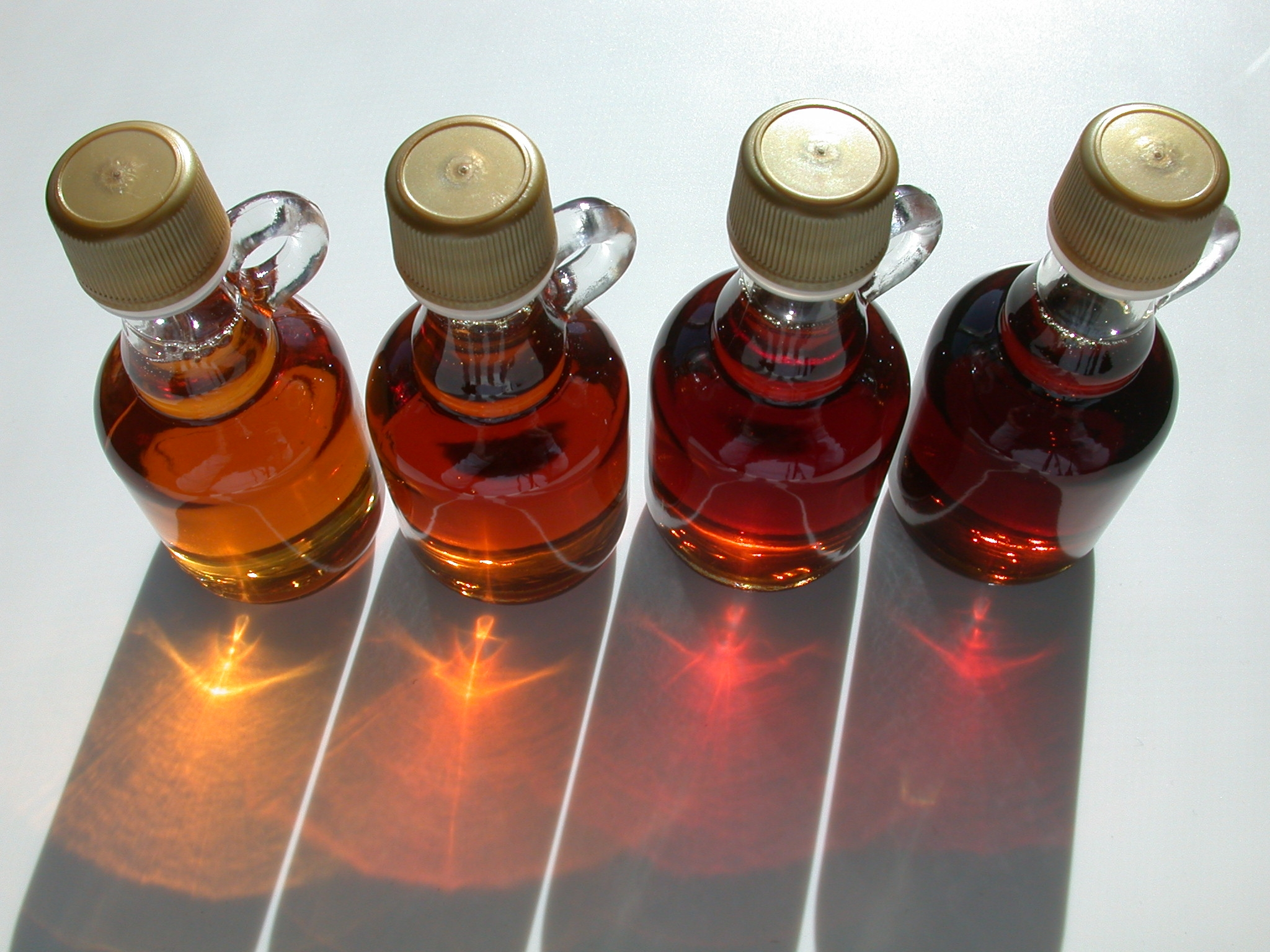
Various grades of U.S. maple syrup

A condiment is a supplemental food (such as a sauce or powder) that is added to some foods to impart a particular flavor, enhance their flavor, or, in some cultures, to complement the dish, but that cannot stand alone as a dish. The term condiment originally described pickled or preserved foods, but now includes a great variety of flavorings. Many diverse condiments exist in various countries, regions and cultures. This list includes notable worldwide condiments.

== Condiments ==
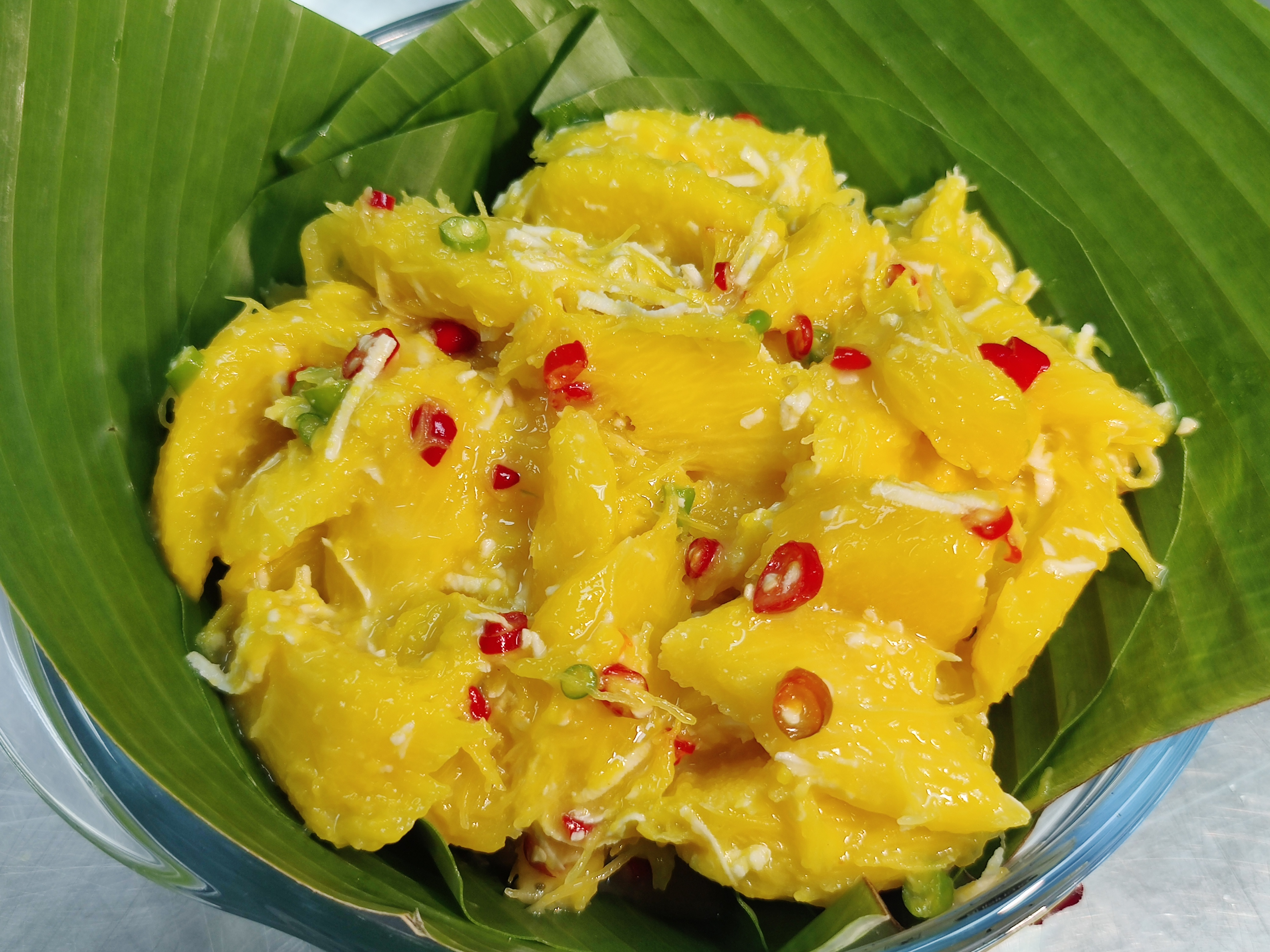
Bambangan (Noonsom bambangan), traditional condiment of the indigenous Kadazan-Dusun of Borneo

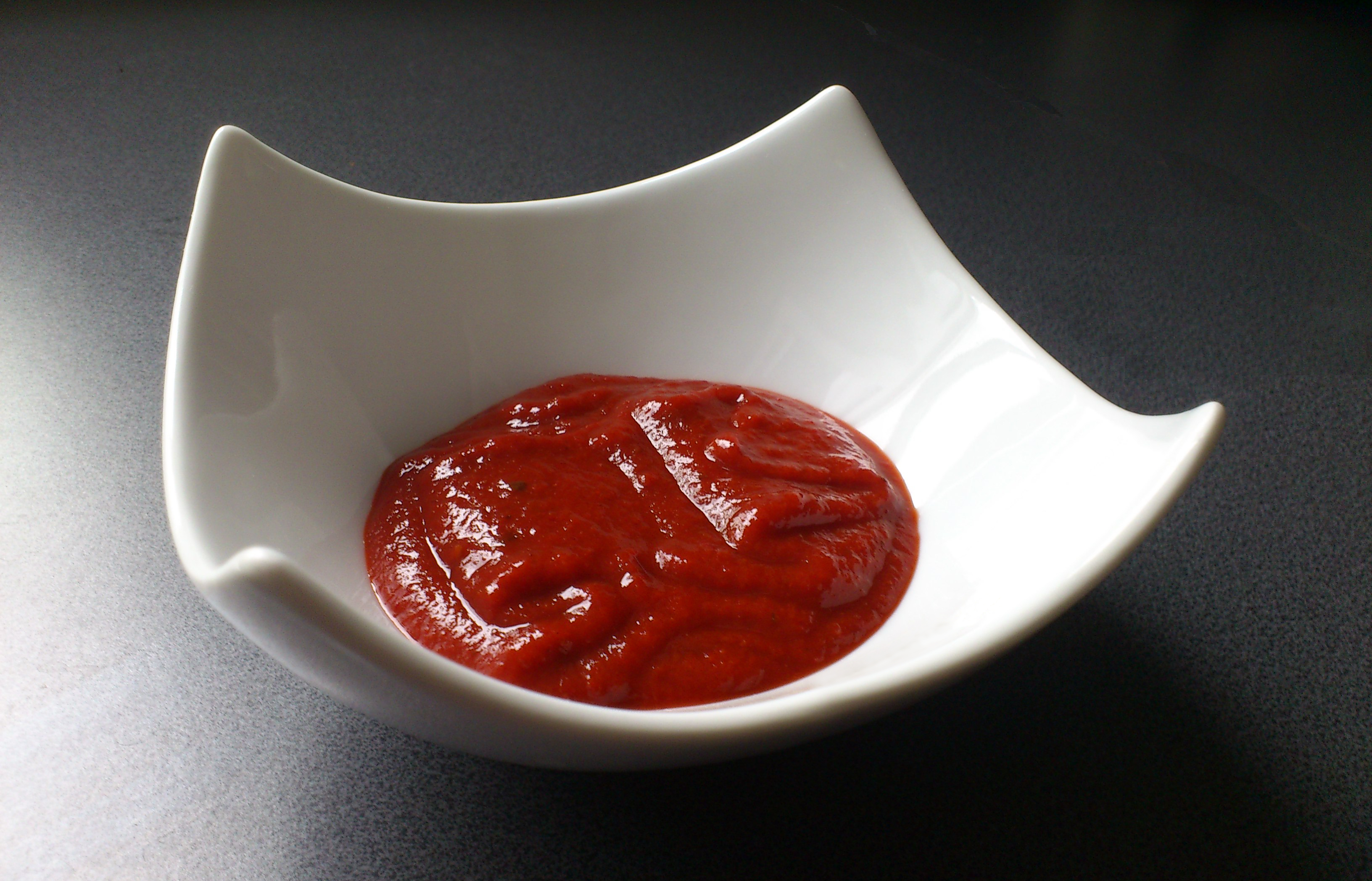
Biber salçası ("pepper paste") is a part of cuisines of Anatolia

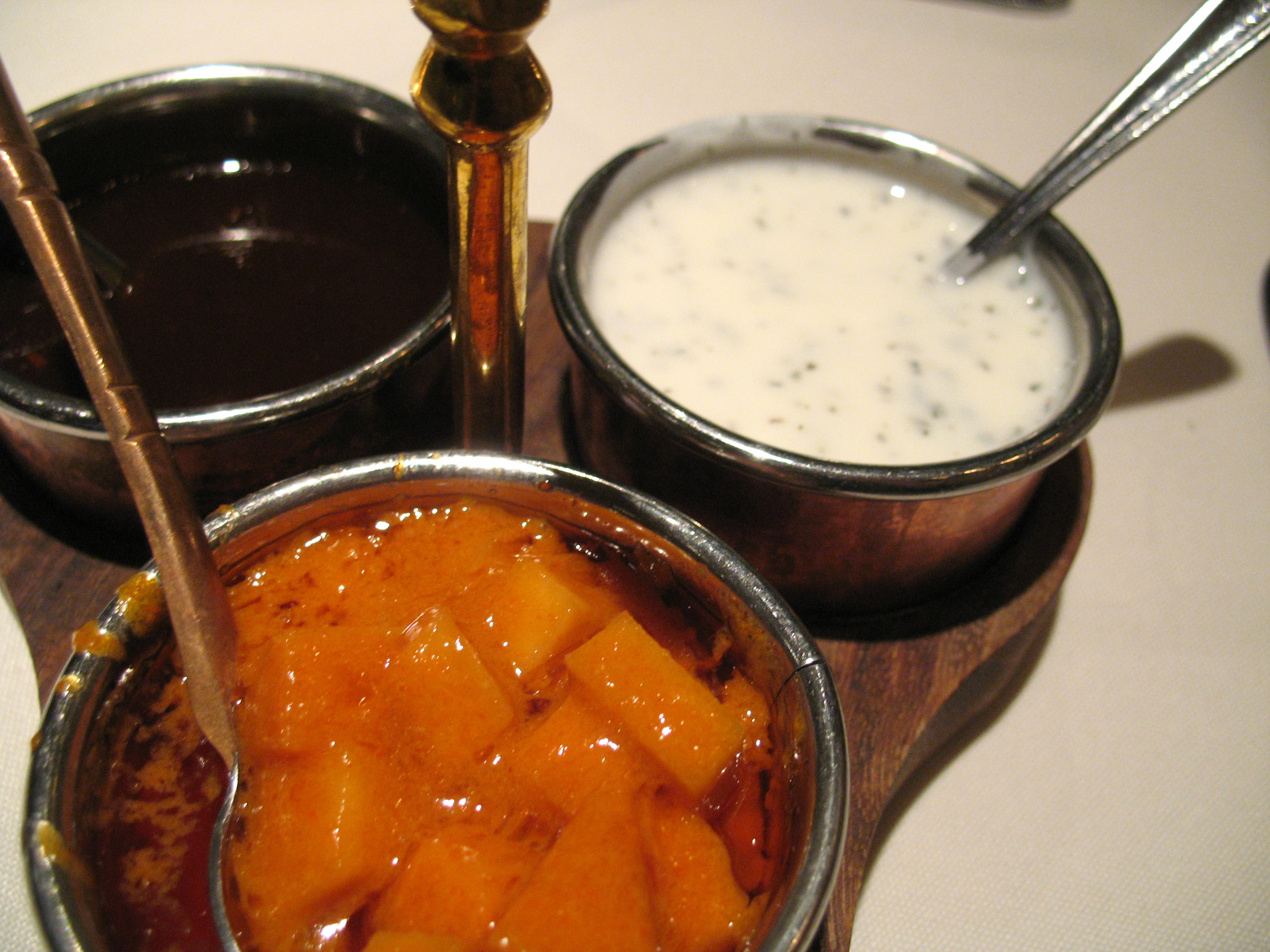
Chutneys

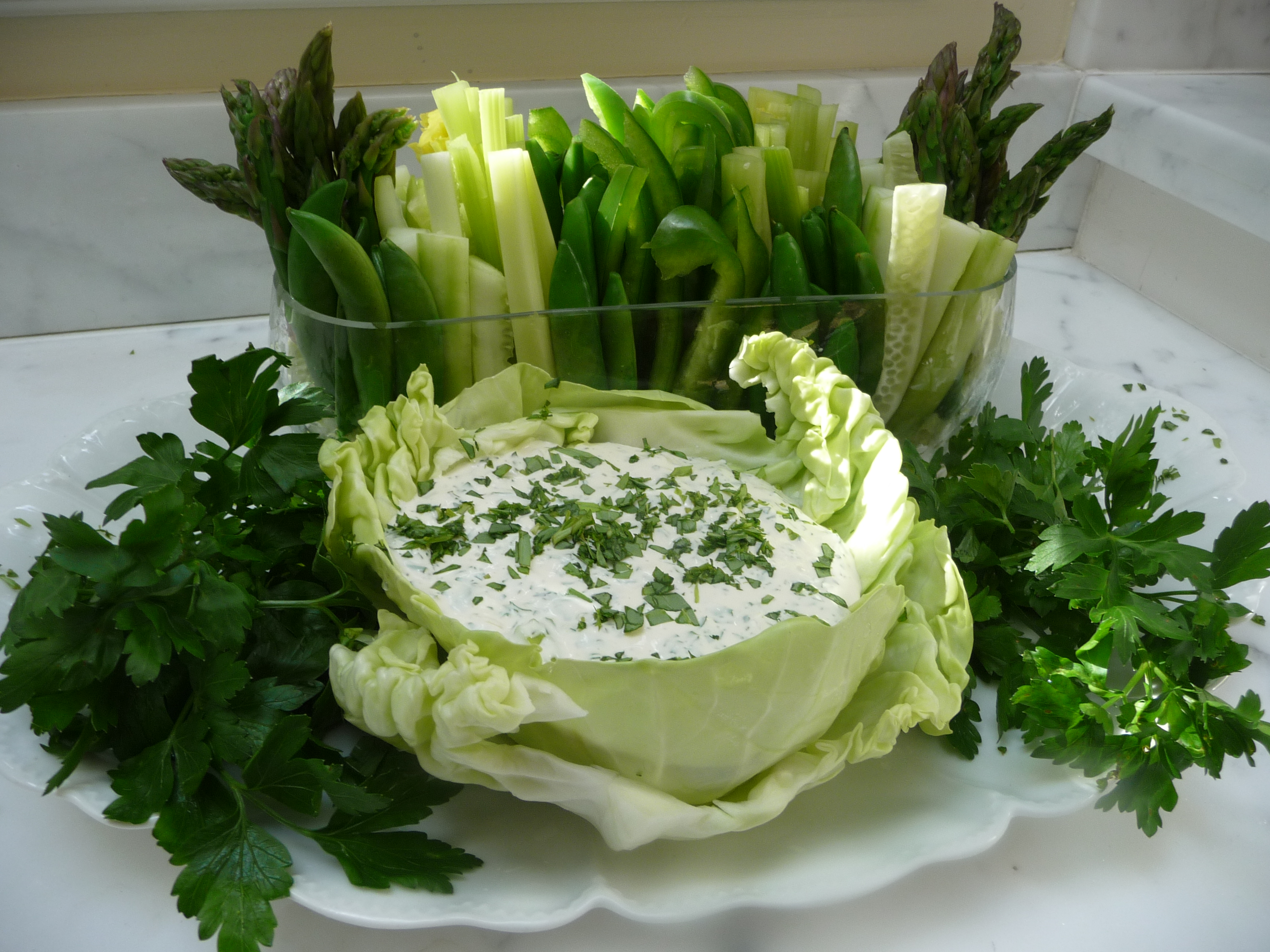
Vegetables served with a green goddess dressing dip

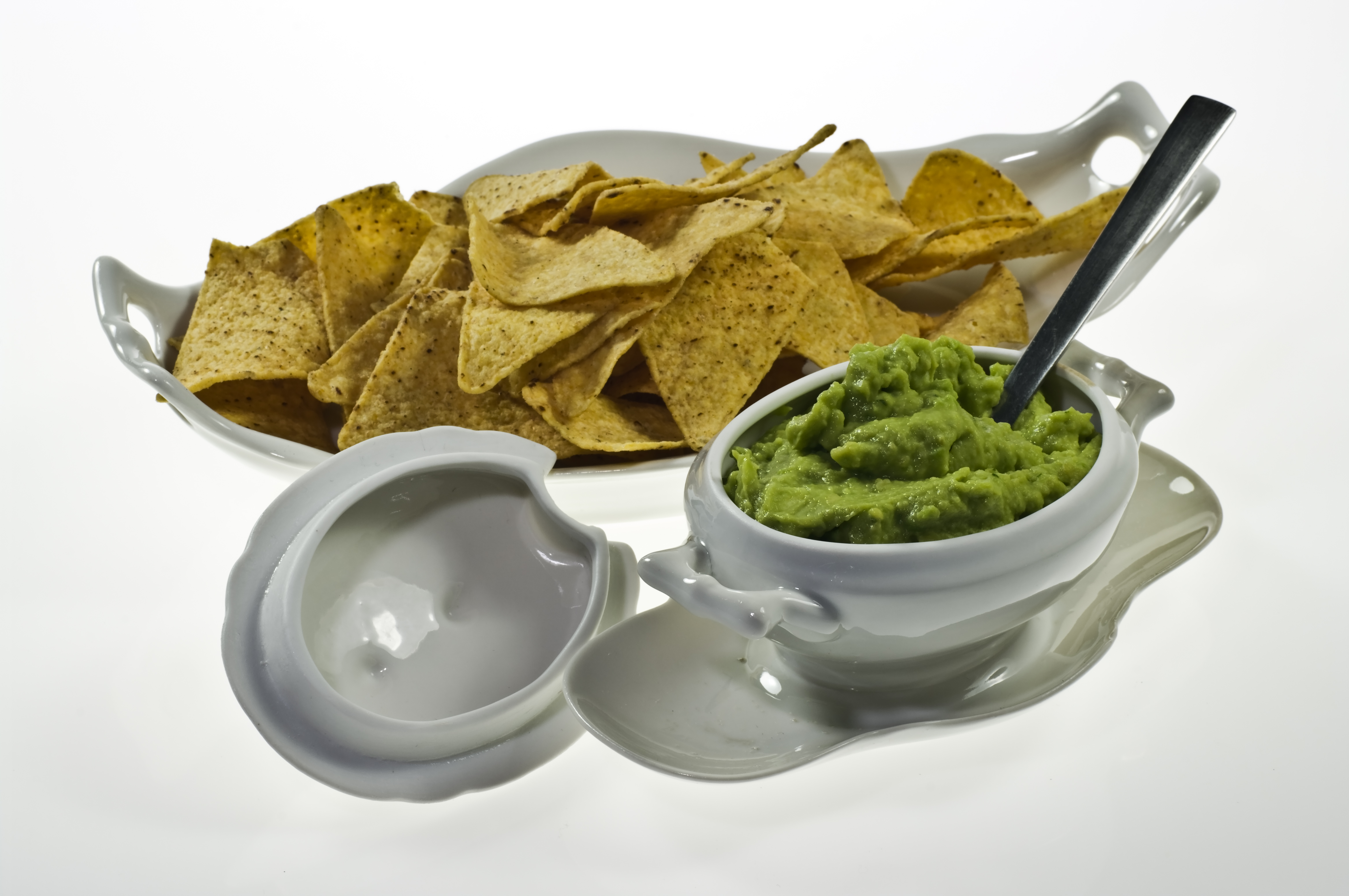
Guacamole is an avocado-based dip that originated with the Aztecs in Mexico.

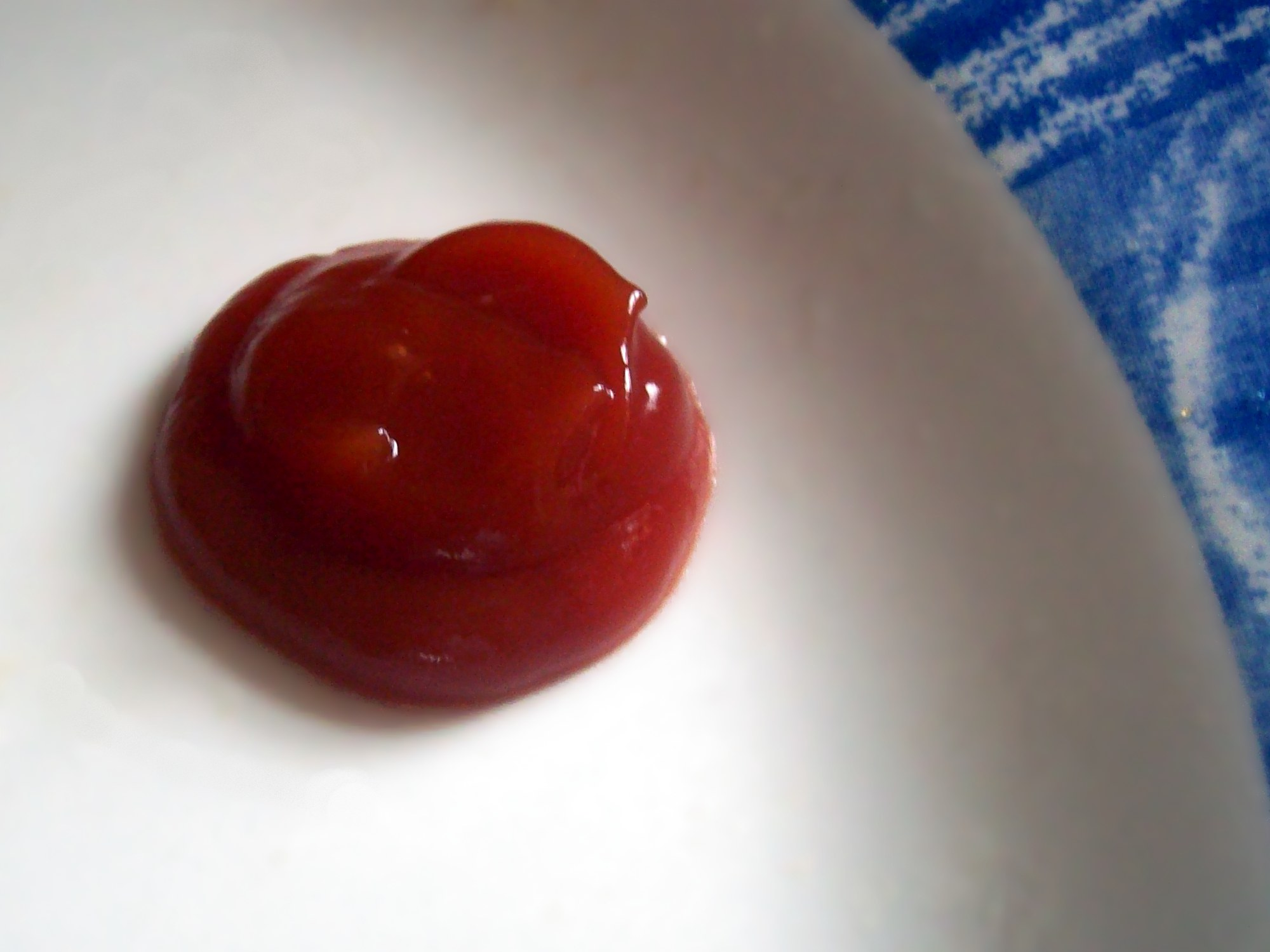
Ketchup is a sweet and tangy sauce, typically made from tomatoes, vinegar, a sweetener, and assorted seasonings and spices.

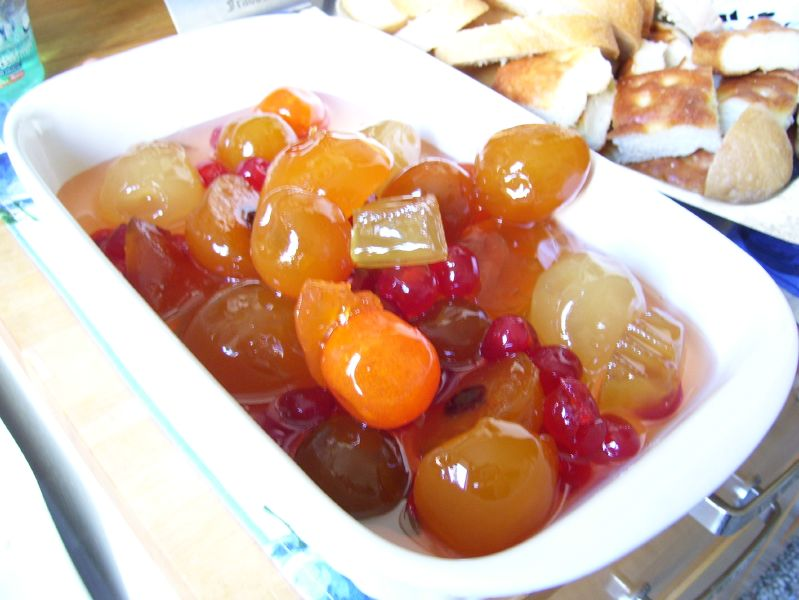
Mostarda is an Italian condiment made of candied fruit and a mustard-flavored syrup.

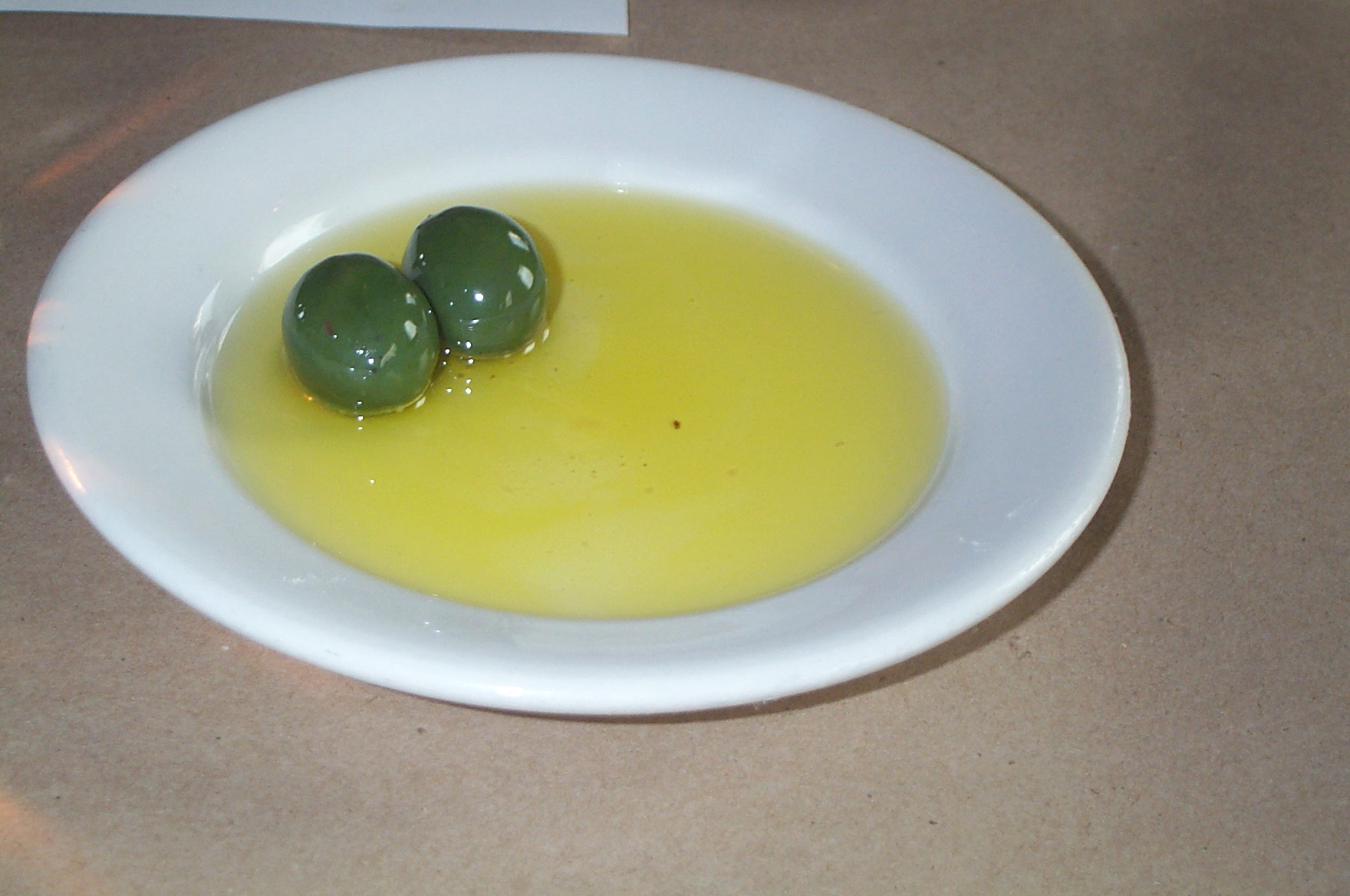
Olive oil and olives

- Aioli – West Mediterranean sauce of garlic and oil
- Ajvar – Balkan condiment
- Amba – Mango pickle condiment
- Alfredo sauce – Creamy pasta dish with butter and cheese
- Au jus – Meat gravy made from cooking juices
- Bambangan – Traditional fermented condiment of Sabah, Malaysia
- Barbecue sauce – Sauce used as a marinade, basting, or topping
- Brown sauce – Type of condiment - Savoury sauce used as a condiment
- Béarnaise sauce – Sauce made of clarified butter and egg yolk
- Béchamel sauce – French white sauce based on roux and milk
- Black pepper – Ground fruit of the family Piperaceae
- Biber salçası – Paste made from peppers or tomato and salt, originating in Turkey
- Butter – Dairy product
- Chili peppers – Genus of flowering plants
- Caramel – Confectionery product made by heating sugars
- Cheese – Curdled milk food product
- Chili oil – Condiment made from chili peppers
- Chili sauce – Condiment prepared with chili peppers
- Chimichurri – Uncooked sauce for meat
- Cranberry sauce – Sauce made from cranberries
- Cream – Dairy product
- Chocolate spread – Sweet chocolate-flavored paste
- Chocolate syrup – Sweet condiment
- Chrain – Species of flowering plant
- Chutney – South Asian condiment
- Cocktail sauce – Condiment served usually with seafoods
- Coleslaw – Salad with finely-shredded raw cabbage
- Compote – Dessert of fruit cooked in syrup
- Crushed red pepper – Condiment or spice made from red chilli peppers
- Dip – Type of condiment
  - List of common dips – Type of condiment
- Disodium inosinate – umami paste
- Fish paste – Paste made of fish meat
  - List of fish pastes – Paste made of fish meat
- Fish sauce – Condiment made from fish
  - List of fish sauces
- Fritessaus – Dutch condiment, usually served with French fries
- Fruit preserves – Preparations of fruits, sugar, and sometimes acid , jams, and jellies
- Fry sauce – Condiment for French fries
- Garlic sauce – Sauce with garlic as a main ingredient
- Garum – Historical fermented fish sauce
- Glutamate flavoring – Generic name for flavor-enhancing compounds based on glutamic acid and its salts
- Gravy – Sauce made from the juices of meats
  - Mushroom gravy – Type of sauce
  - Onion gravy – Type of sauce
  - Red-eye gravy – Type of gravy
- Harissa – North African paste of roasted red peppers, hot peppers, spices, oil, and other flavor ingredients
- Hoisin sauce – Sauce commonly used in Chinese cuisine
- Hollandaise sauce – Sauce made of egg, butter, and lemon
- Honey – Sweet and viscous substance made by bees
- Honey dill – Condiment
- Horseradish – Species of flowering plant
- Hummus – Middle Eastern chickpea puree dish
- Icing – Food producing method that could be applied to many sweets
- Jalapeños – Hot pepper
- Kachumbari – Tomato-onion salad
- Karo – Syrup made from corn used as food additive
- Ketchup – Sauce used as a condiment
  - Banana ketchup – Sauce made from bananas
  - Curry ketchup - Ketchup with curry powder
  - Mushroom ketchup – Style of ketchup
  - Fruit ketchup – Condiment made from fruit
- Khrenovina – Spicy horseradish sauce
- Kyopolou – Bulgarian-Turkish dish
- Lemon – Yellow citrus fruit
- Lettuce – Leaf vegetable
- Ljutenica – Vegetable relish or chutney in Bulgarian, Macedonian, Serbian and Turkish cuisines
- Mango chutney – Indian chutney made from unripe mangoes
- Maple butter – Confection made from maple syrup
- Maple syrup – Syrup made from the sap of maple trees
- Marinara sauce – Tomato sauce with herbs
- Marmalade – Preserve made from citrus fruits
- Matbucha — a North African condiment
- Mayonnaise – Thick cold sauce
  - List of mayonnaises – List of mayonnaises
- Meringue – Type of dessert or candy
- Mignonette sauce – Condiment served with oysters
- Milk – Nutrient-rich liquid produced by mammals
- Milkette – Name of various beverages and foods made of equally mixed parts
- Miso – Traditional Japanese seasoning
- Monkey gland sauce – South African sauce
- Muhammara – Red pepper dip from Syrian cuisine
- Murri – Arabian condiment
- Mustard – Condiment made from mustard seeds
  - Dijon mustard – Type of mustard
  - Mostarda – Condiment from Italy made of candied fruit and mustard
  - Mustard oil – Oil derived from mustard plants
  - Tewkesbury mustard – Type of mustard
  - Turun sinappi – Finnish mustard brand established 1926
  - Honey mustard – Condiment made from mustard seeds
  - List of mustard brands
- Nacho cheese – Tortilla chip dish
- Nutritional yeast – Type of deactivated yeast
- Old sour – Fermented key lime juice used in sauces
- Olive oil – Liquid fat made from olives
- Oyster sauce
- Pepper, black – Ground fruit of the family Piperaceae
- Pepper jelly – Preserve made with hot peppers
- Peanut butter – Paste made from ground peanuts
- Pesto – Italian food paste
- Piccalilli – British relish of chopped pickled vegetables and spices
- South Asian pickle – Pickled varieties of vegetable and fruit

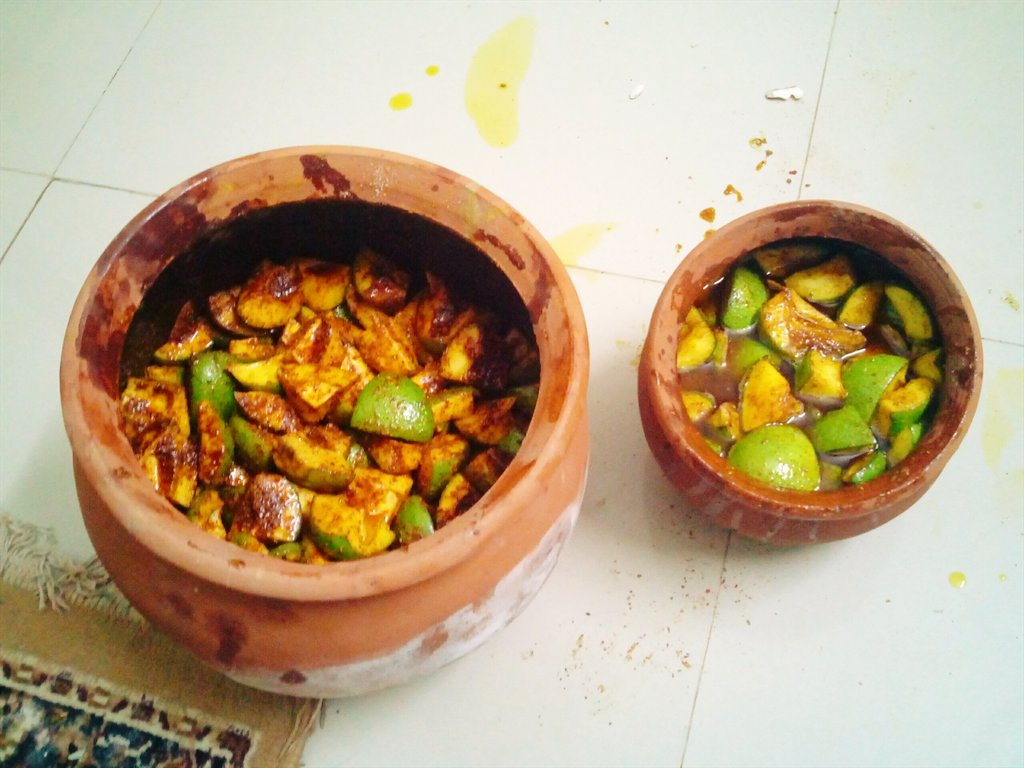
Homemade mango pickle

  - Mango pickle – Variety of pickles prepared using mango
  - Pickled fruit – Fruit preserved in brine or vinegar
  - Pickled onion – Onions pickled in a solution of vinegar or salt
  - Pickled pepper – Capsicum pepper preserved by pickling
- Pico de gallo – Mexican condiment
- Pinđur – Relish spread in the Balkan peninsula
- Piri-piri – Cultivar of Capsicum frutescens
- Popcorn seasoning – Ingredients used to flavor popcorn
- Powdered sugar – Fine sugar with an anti-caking agent

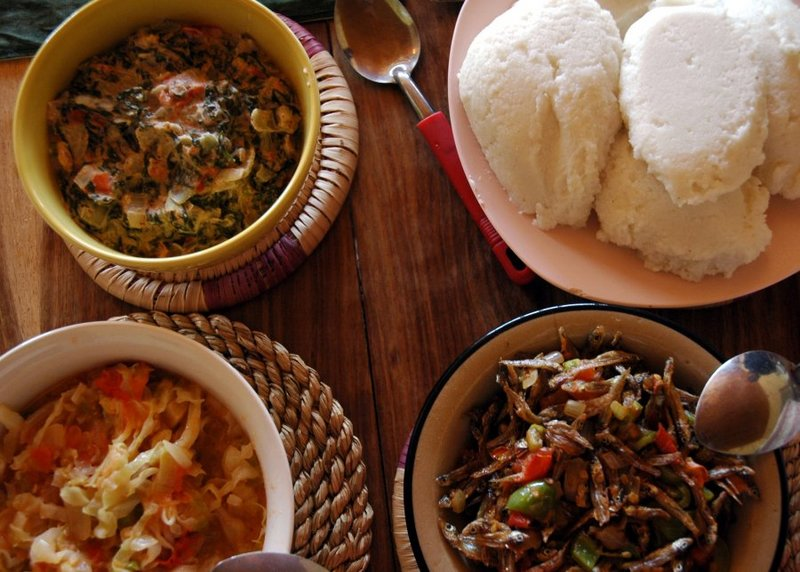
Three relishes here accompany Nshima (top right), a cornmeal product in African cuisine

- Relish – Condiment made from cooked pickled vegetables, fruit or herbs
  - Chicago-style relish – Condiment
  - Kuchela – Trinidadian relish
- Remoulade – Mayonnaise-based cold sauce

Making vinaigrette salad dressing

- Salad dressing – Condiment for salads
- Salad dressing spread – Salad dressing and mayonnaise substitute
- Salsa – Condiment used in Mexican cuisine
- Salsa golf – Cold sauce of mayonnaise and tomatoes
- Salsa verde – Spicy Mexican sauce made from tomatillos
- Salt – Mineral composed of sodium chloride
- Sambal – Southeast Asian spicy relish or sauce
- Sauerkraut – Finely sliced and fermented cabbage
- Sesame oil – Edible oil from sesame seed
- Sesame seeds – Plant cultivated for its edible seeds
- Skyronnes – Icelandic dipping sauces
- Soup - Savory liquid mixture sometimes used to dip bread or crackers
- Sour cream – Fermented dairy product

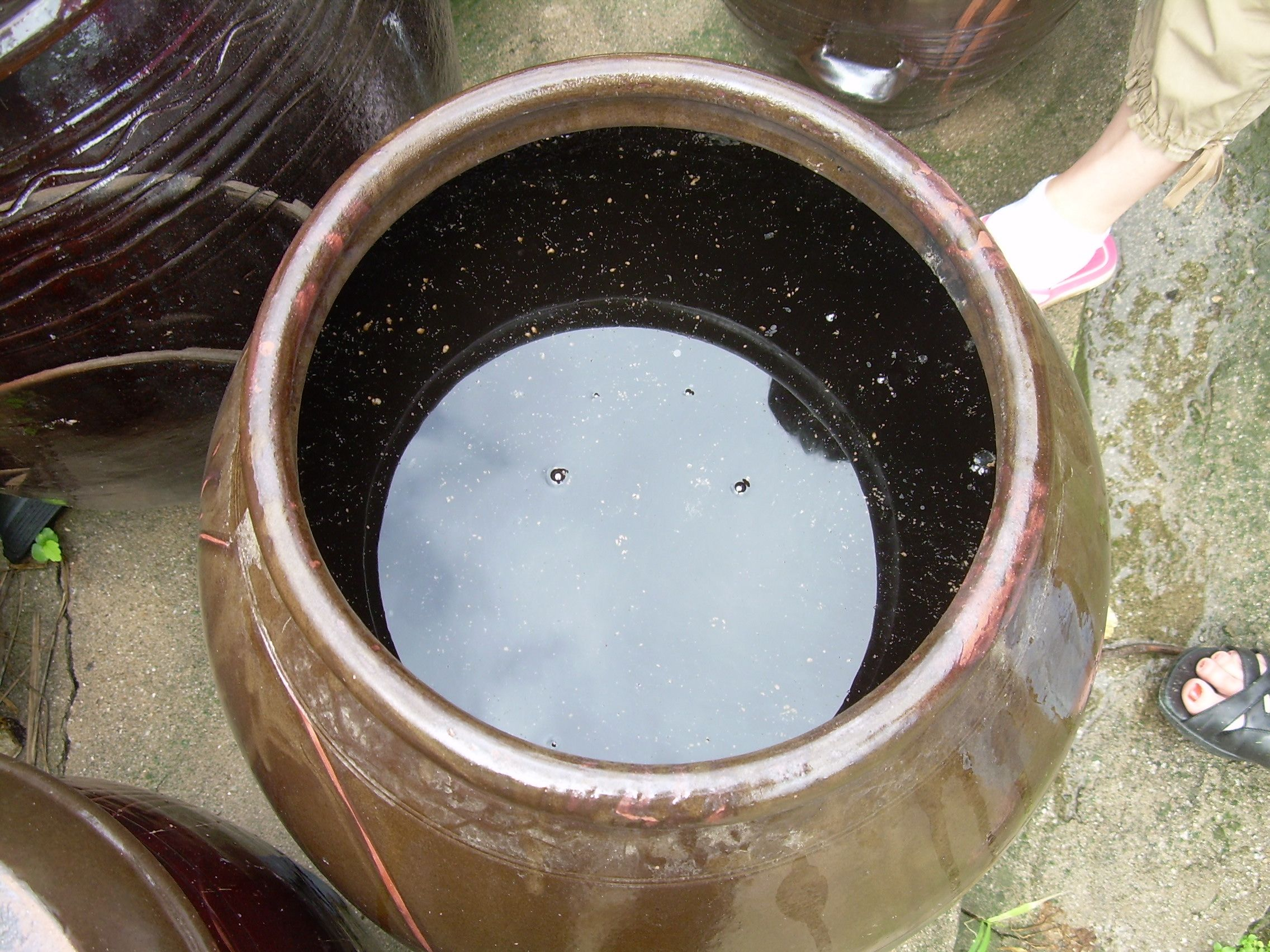
Traditional Korean soy sauce

- Soy sauce - Savory sauce made from fermented soy beans, originating from China
  - Sweet soy sauce – Sweetened aromatic soy sauce, originating from Java, Indonesia
- Sprinkles – Tiny multi-colored candy topping
- Steak sauce – Brown sauce for seasoning of steaks
- Sriracha sauce – Thai hot sauce
- Sumbala – Fermented locust beans used as condiment in cooking in West Africa
- Sweet chili sauce – Condiment primarily used as a dip
- Syrup – Thick, viscous solution of sugar in water
- Tahini – Middle Eastern condiment made from sesame
- Tartar sauce – Mayonnaise-based cold sauce
- Tekka – Condiment
- Teriyaki sauce – Japanese marinade
- Tomato paste – Paste made from tomatoes
- Tomato sauce – Sauce made primarily from tomatoes
- Toum – Garlic sauce common in the Levant
- Truffle oil – Oil with truffles or synthetic flavouring
- Tzatziki – Cold cucumber–yogurt dip, soup, or sauce
- Vegenaise – American vegan food company
- Velouté sauce – French sauce made from roux and light stock

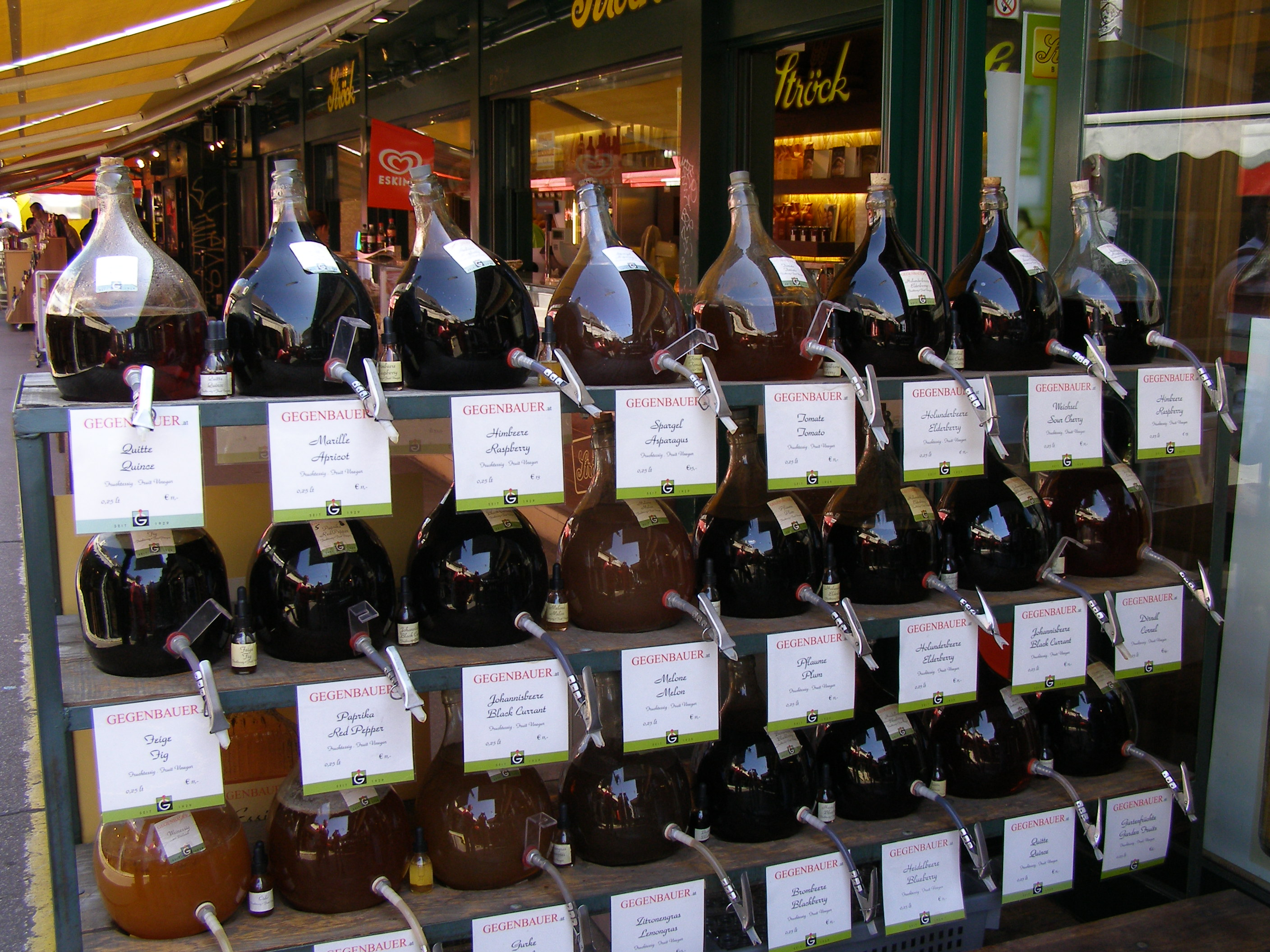
Various vinegars

- Vinegar – Liquid consisting mainly of acetic acid and water
  - Black vinegar – Dark-colored vinegar in Chinese cuisine
- Wasabi – Species of edible plant
- Watermelon rind preserves – Fruit condiment
- Whipped cream – Semi-solid aerated cream
- White pepper – Ground fruit of the family Piperaceae
- XO sauce – Spicy seafood sauce from Hong Kong

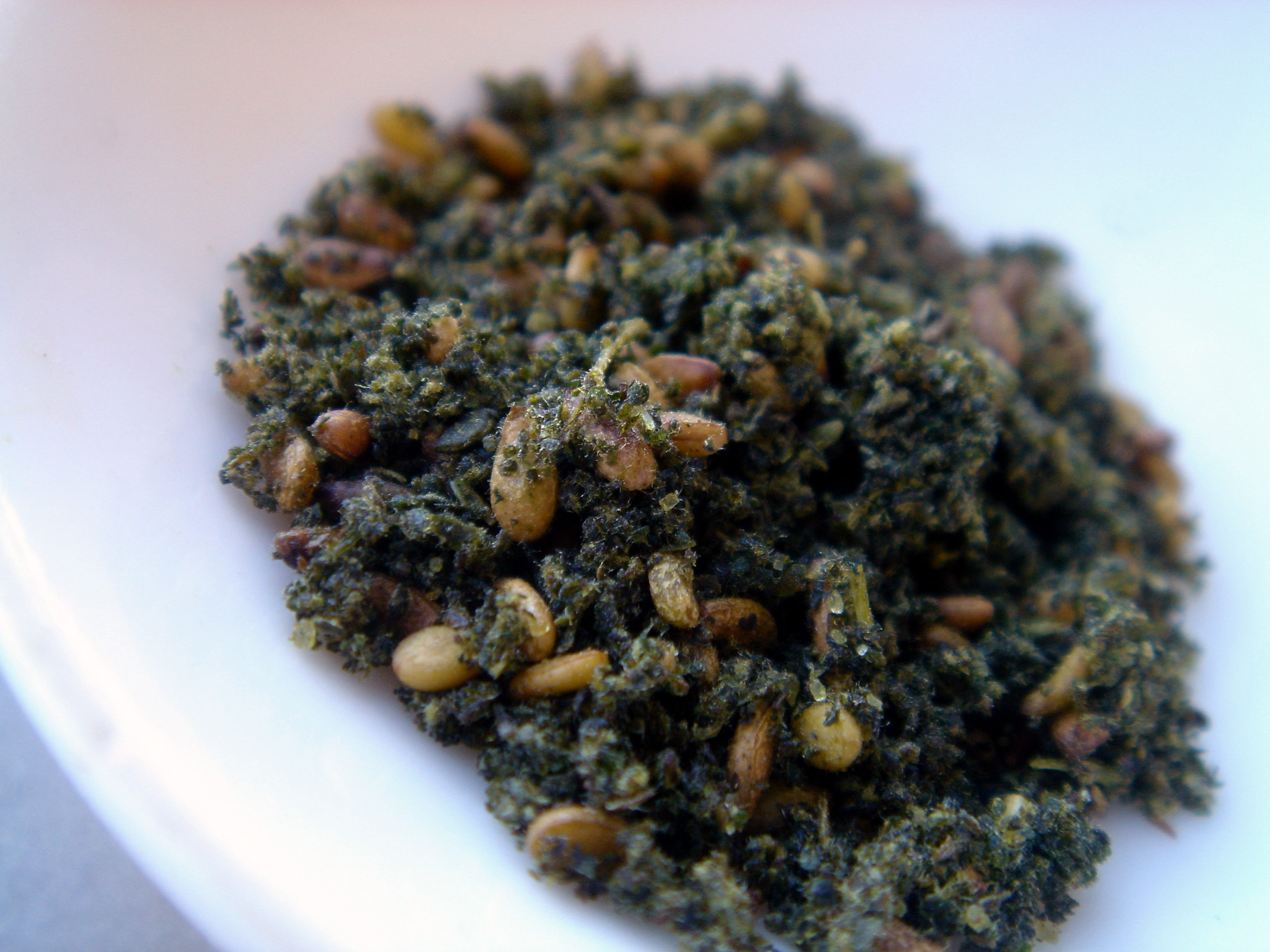
Close-up image of za'atar, a blend of herbs, sesame, and salt

- Za'atar – Levantine herb or herb blend
- Zacuscă – Romanian, Moldovan and Hungarian condiment

== By country ==
=== Australia ===
- Chicken salt
- Tomato sauce

=== Azerbaijan ===
- Narsharab – pomegranate sauce

=== Bangladesh ===
- Achaar
- Chutney
- Kasundi
- Raita
- Tomato sauce

=== Belgium ===
- "Bicky" sauce – a commercial brand made from mayonnaise, white cabbage, tarragon, cucumber, onion, mustard and dextrose
- Brasil sauce – mayonnaise with pureed pineapple, tomato and spices
- Samurai sauce
- Sauce "Pickles"– a yellow vinegar based sauce with turmeric, mustard and crunchy vegetable chunks, similar to Piccalilli
- Sauce andalouse
- Zigeuner sauce – Sauce in French cuisine – A "gypsy" sauce of tomatoes, paprika and chopped bell peppers, borrowed from Germany

=== Canada ===
- Maple syrup

=== Chile ===
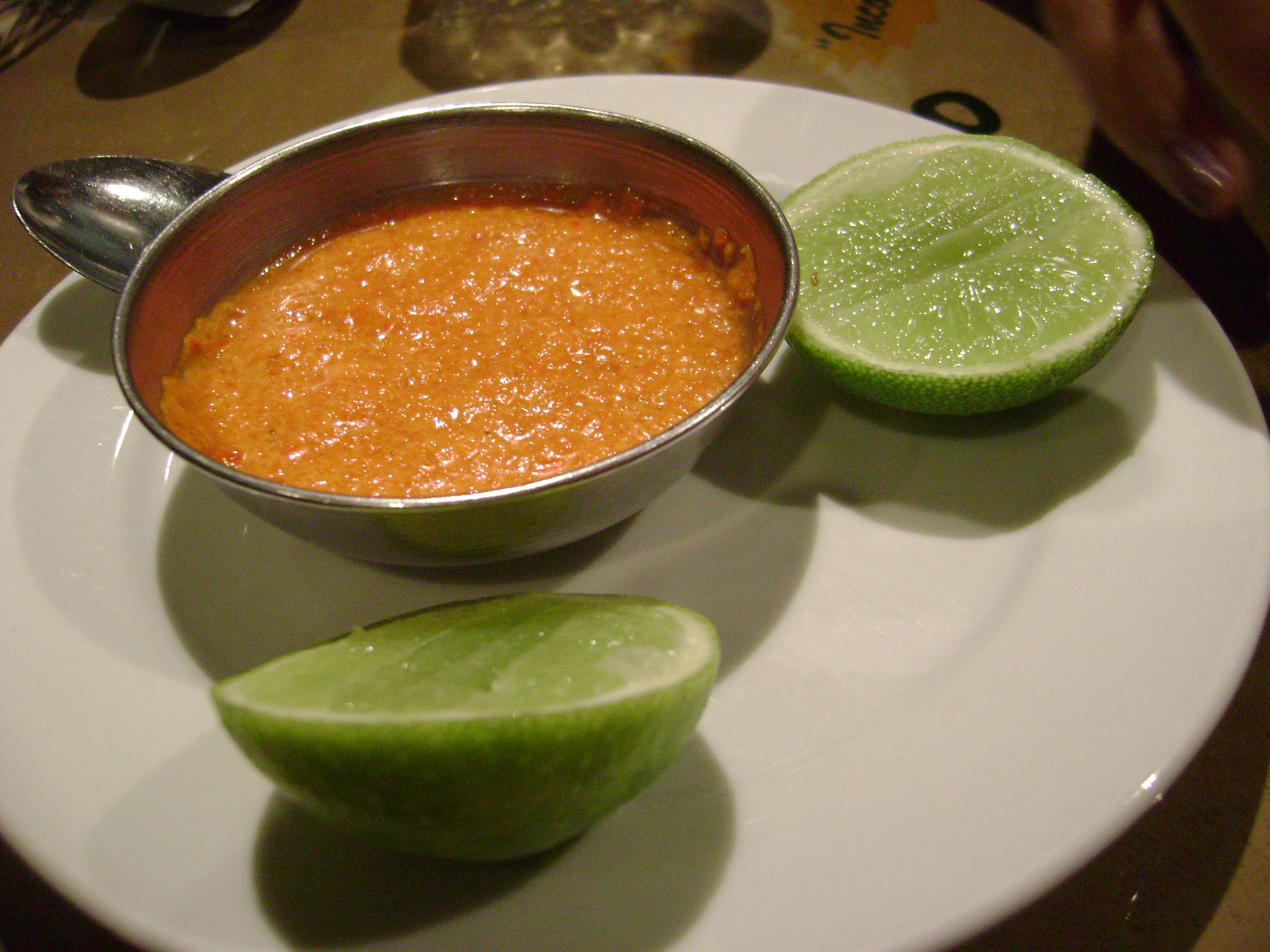
Ají with lime

- Ají
- Pebre

=== China ===
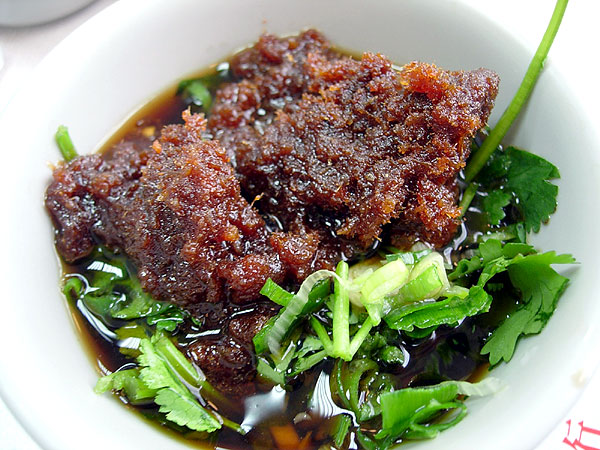
Shacha sauce with coriander

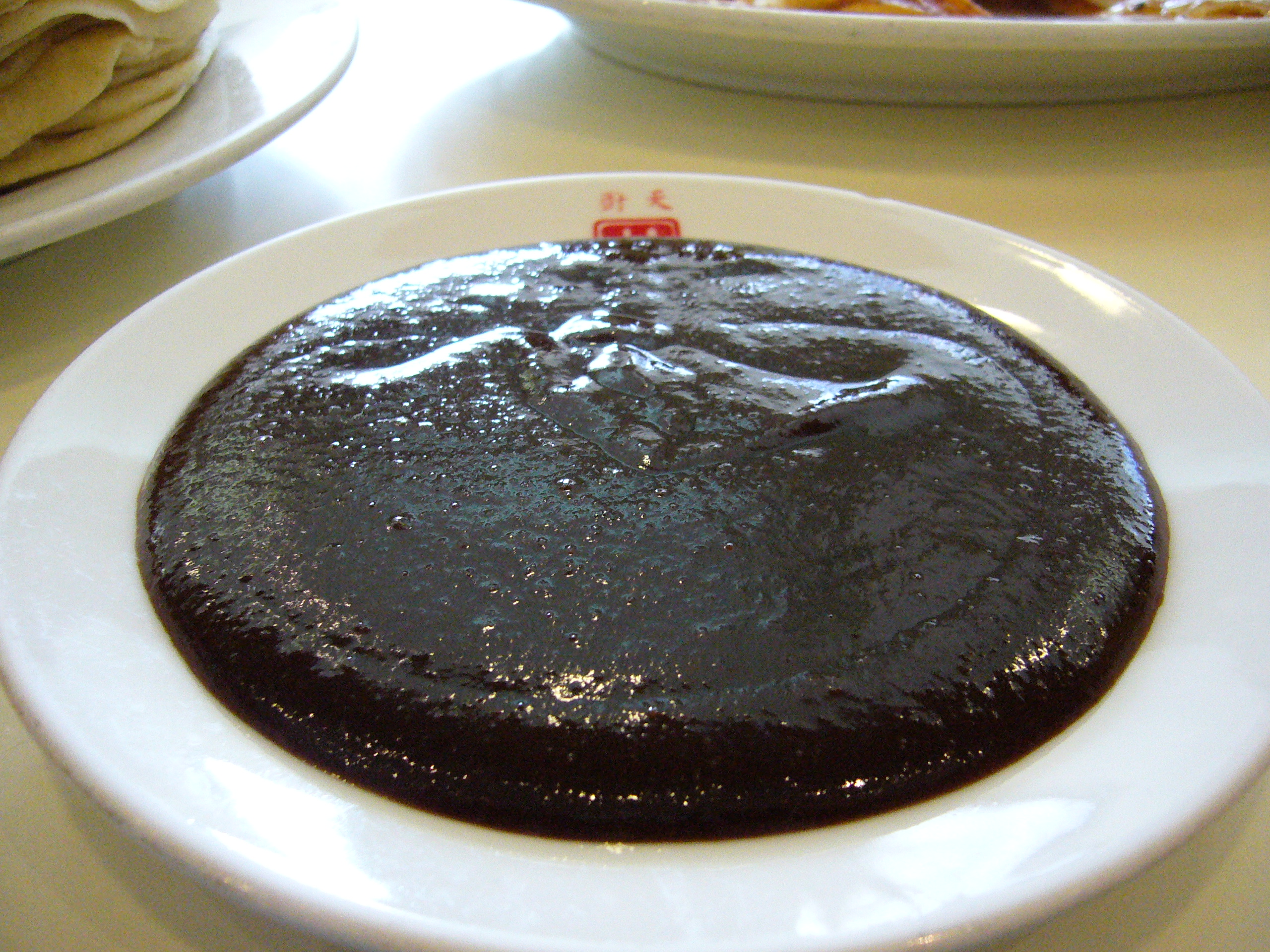
Sweet bean sauce

- Black vinegar
  - Zhenjiang Vinegar
- Black bean sauce
- Chili crisp
- Chili oil
- Doubanjiang
- Duck sauce
- Fermented bean paste
- Ginger dressing
- Hoisin sauce
- Lufu
- Mala sauce
- Oyster sauce
- Peanut sauce
- Plum sauce
- Rice vinegar
- Sesame oil
- Shacha sauce
- Sichuan pepper
- Siu haau sauce
- Soy sauce
- Sweet bean sauce
- Tauco
- XO sauce
- Yellow soybean paste
- Zanthoxylum ailanthoides

=== France ===
- Cornichons
- Croutons
- Mayonnaise
- Mustard (condiment)
- Pistou
- Tartar sauce

=== Georgia ===
- Ajika
- Tkemali

=== Germany ===
- Zigeuner sauce (gypsy sauce)
- Curry ketchup
- Sahnemeerretich (horseradish paste with cream)
- Kren (horseradish paste without cream)
- süßer Senf (Bavarian mustard)
- Green sauce

=== Ghana ===
- Shito
- Groundnut

=== Greece ===
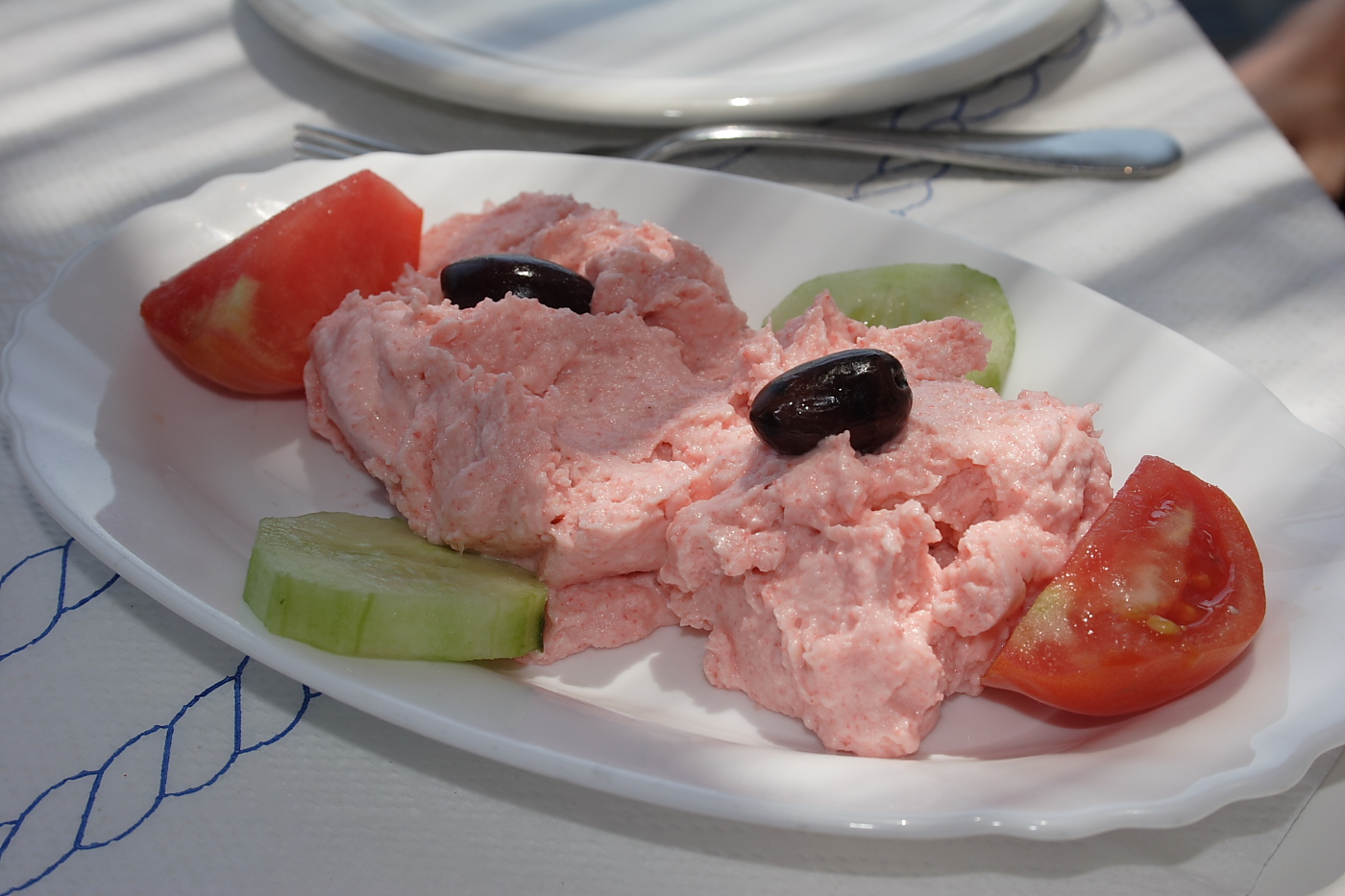
Taramosalata with garnishes

- Fava
- Melitzanosalata
- Skordalia
- Taramosalata
- Tzatziki
- Tirokafteri

=== India ===
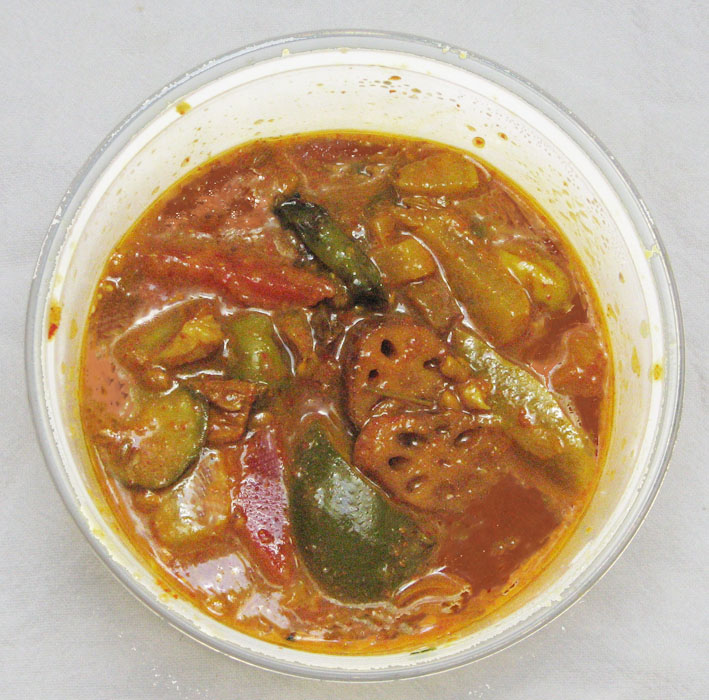
Indian mixed pickle, containing lotus root, lemon, carrot, green mango, green chilis, and other ingredients

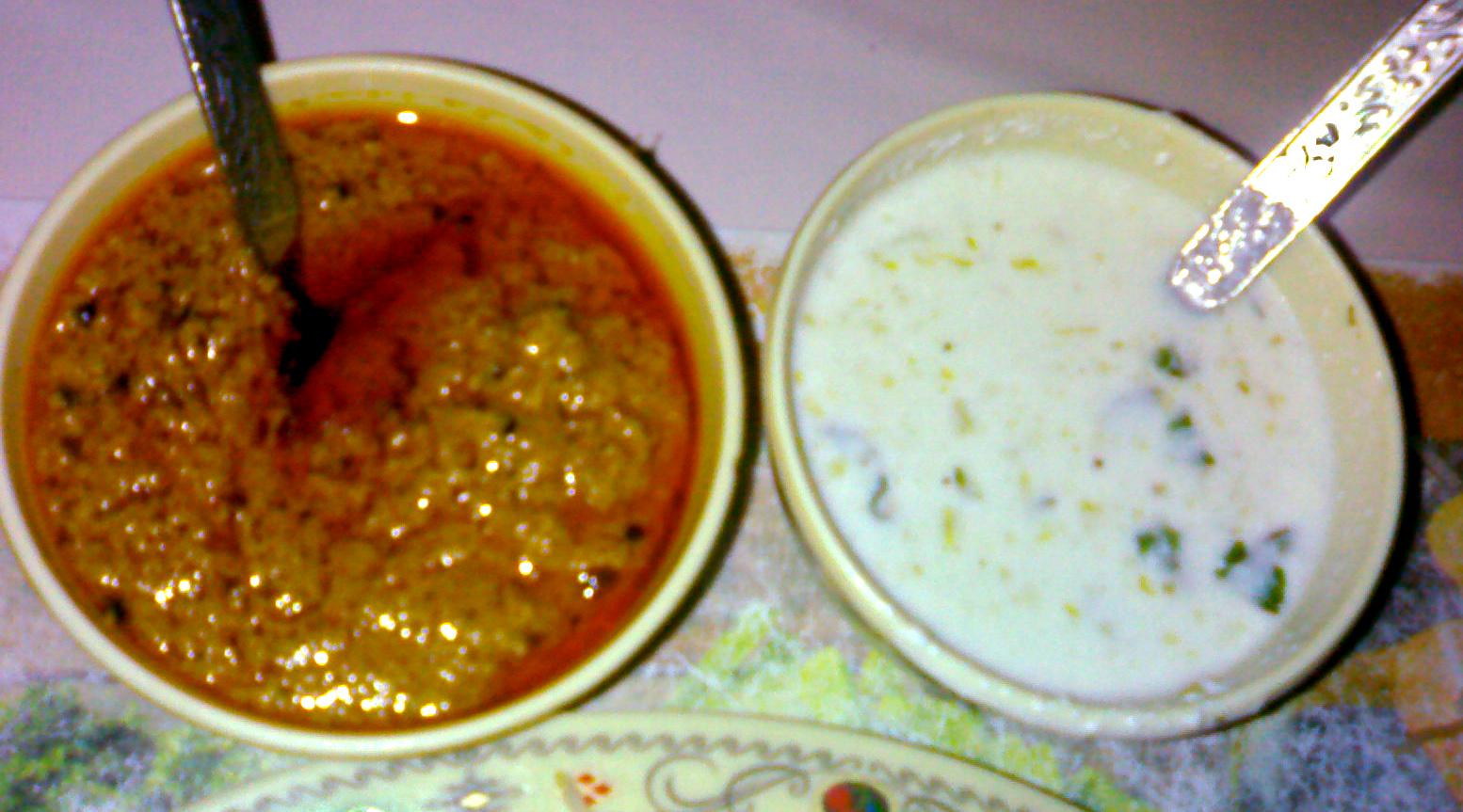
Mirchi ka salan (left) and dahi chutney (right) served as side dishes for Hyderabadi biryani

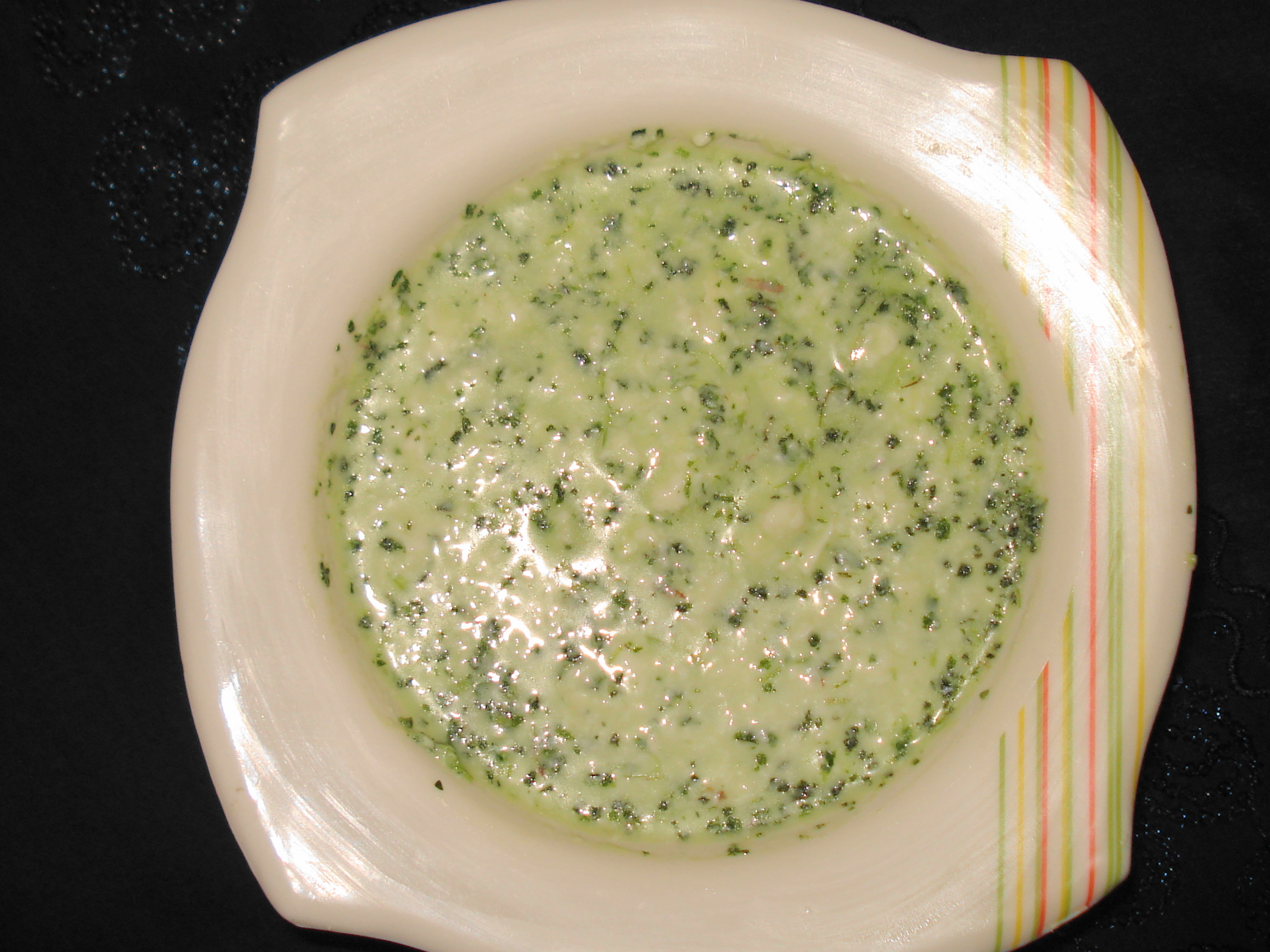
A cucumber and mint raita

- Chammanthi podi
- Chutney
- Chyawanprash
- Coconut chutney
- Dahi chutney
- Garlic chutney
- Gulkand
- Idli podi
- Indian pickles
  - Aavakaaya
  - Chhundo
  - Ginger pickle
  - Lime pickle
  - Mango pickle
  - Mixed pickle
  - Murabba
  - Oorgai
  - Pachranga
- Indian relish
- Kerala pachadi
- Mirchi ka salan
- Ouu khatta
- Pachadi
- Perugu Pachadi
- Putnis
- Raita
- Sooth

=== Italy ===
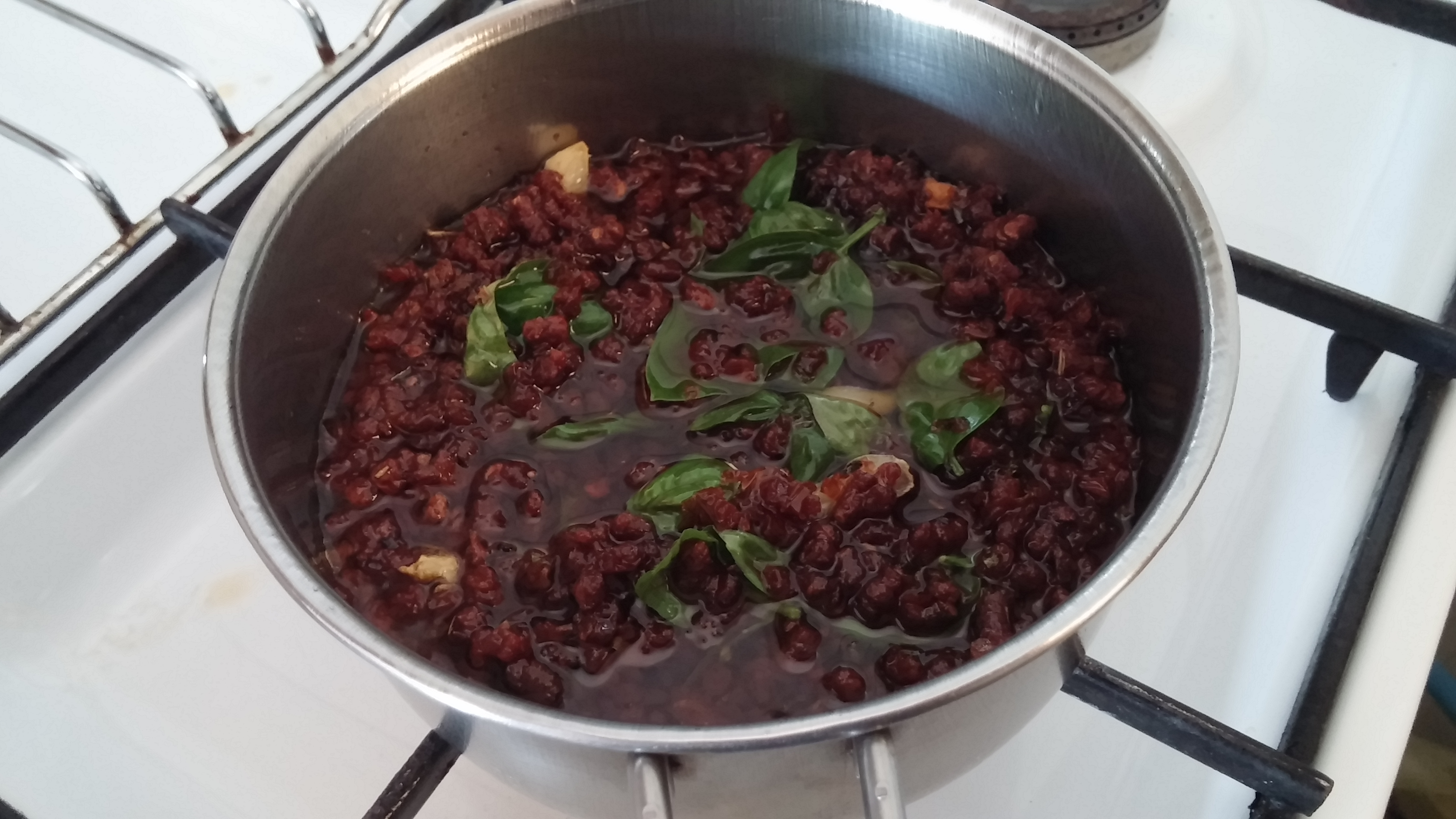
Capuliato

- Alioli – a Mediterranean sauce made of garlic and olive oil
- Agliata – a garlic sauce and condiment in Italian cuisine
- Traditional balsamic vinegar of Modena
- Capuliato – a Sicilian condiment based upon dried tomatoes
- Garum – a fermented fish sauce used as a condiment.
- Gremolata
- Olio extravergine d'oliva
- Pesto – a sauce consisting of crushed garlic, European pine nuts, coarse salt, basil leaves, hard cheese such as Parmigiano-Reggiano (also known as Parmesan cheese) or Pecorino Sardo (cheese made from sheep's milk), all blended with olive oil.
- Saba – a condiment made from boiling down must, the grape mush left over from making wine.
- Salmoriglio
- Vincotto

=== Indonesia ===
- Acar
- Bawang goreng
- Colo-colo
- Dabu-dabu
- Kecap asin
- Kecap manis
- Krupuk
  - Amplang
  - Emping
  - Krupuk ikan
  - Kemplang
  - Kripik
  - Krupuk kulit
  - Krupuk udang
  - Rengginang
  - Rempeyek
- Palm vinegar
- Peanut sauce
- Petis

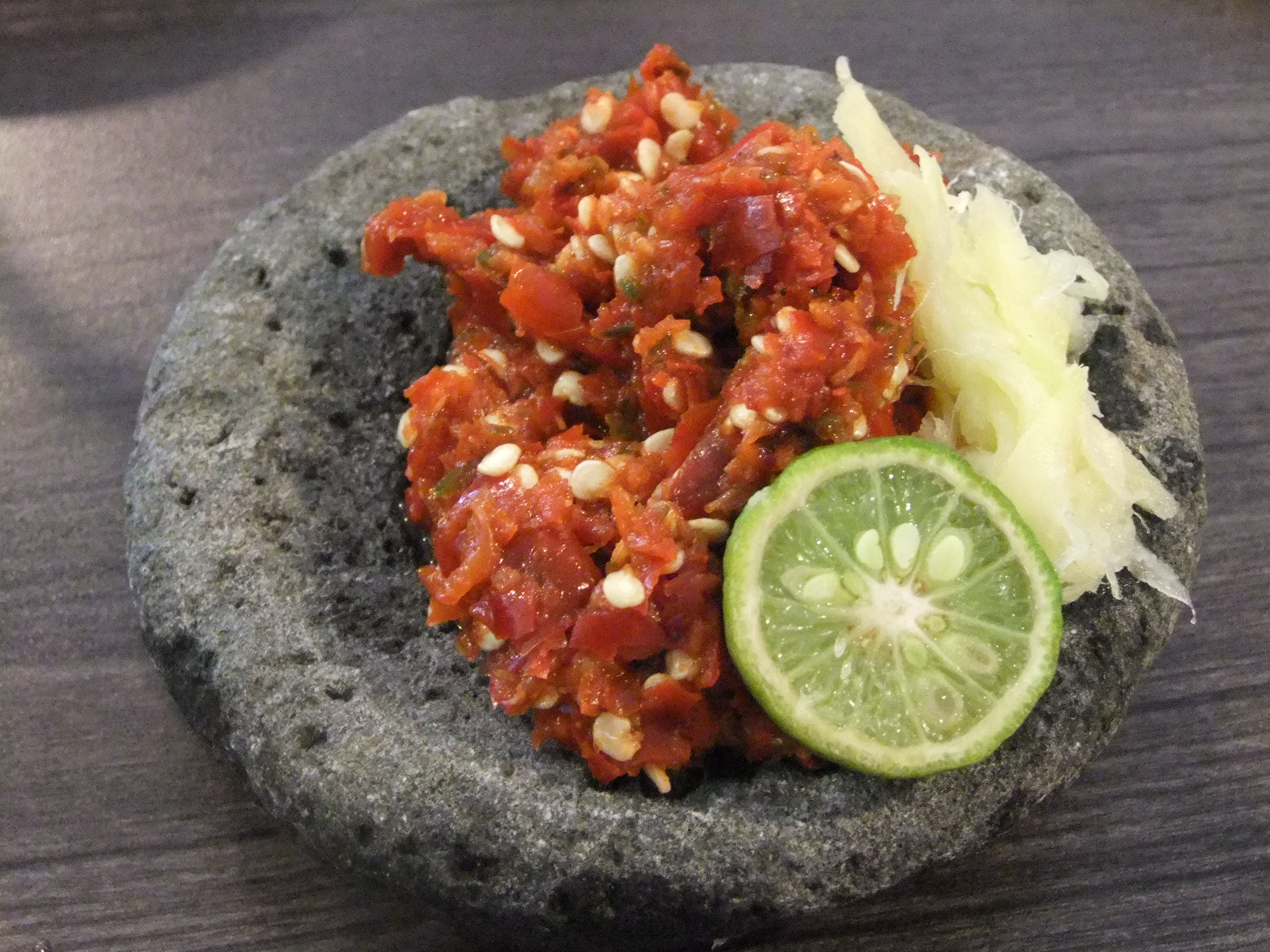
Traditional sambal terasi served on stone mortar with garlic and lime

- Sambal
  - Sambal balado
  - Sambal colo-colo
  - Sambal dabu-dabu
  - Sambal rica rica
  - Sambal Tuktuk
- Tamarind paste
- Tauco
- Terasi

=== Iran ===
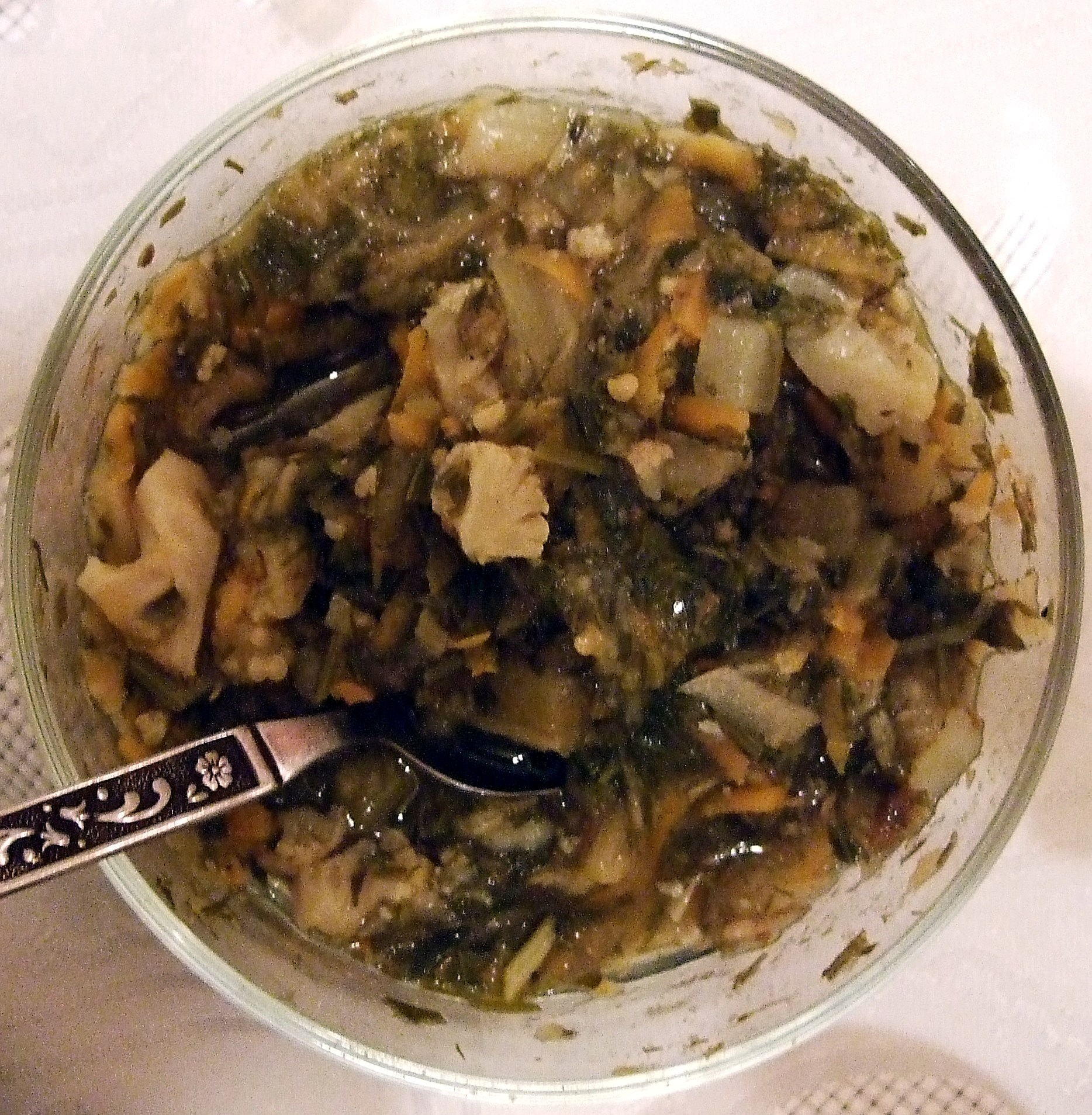
Torshi liteh made with vinegar, eggplants and herbs

- Golpar
- Kashk
- Mast o khiar
- Sumagh
- Torshi
- Rose syrup
- Chashni

=== Japan ===
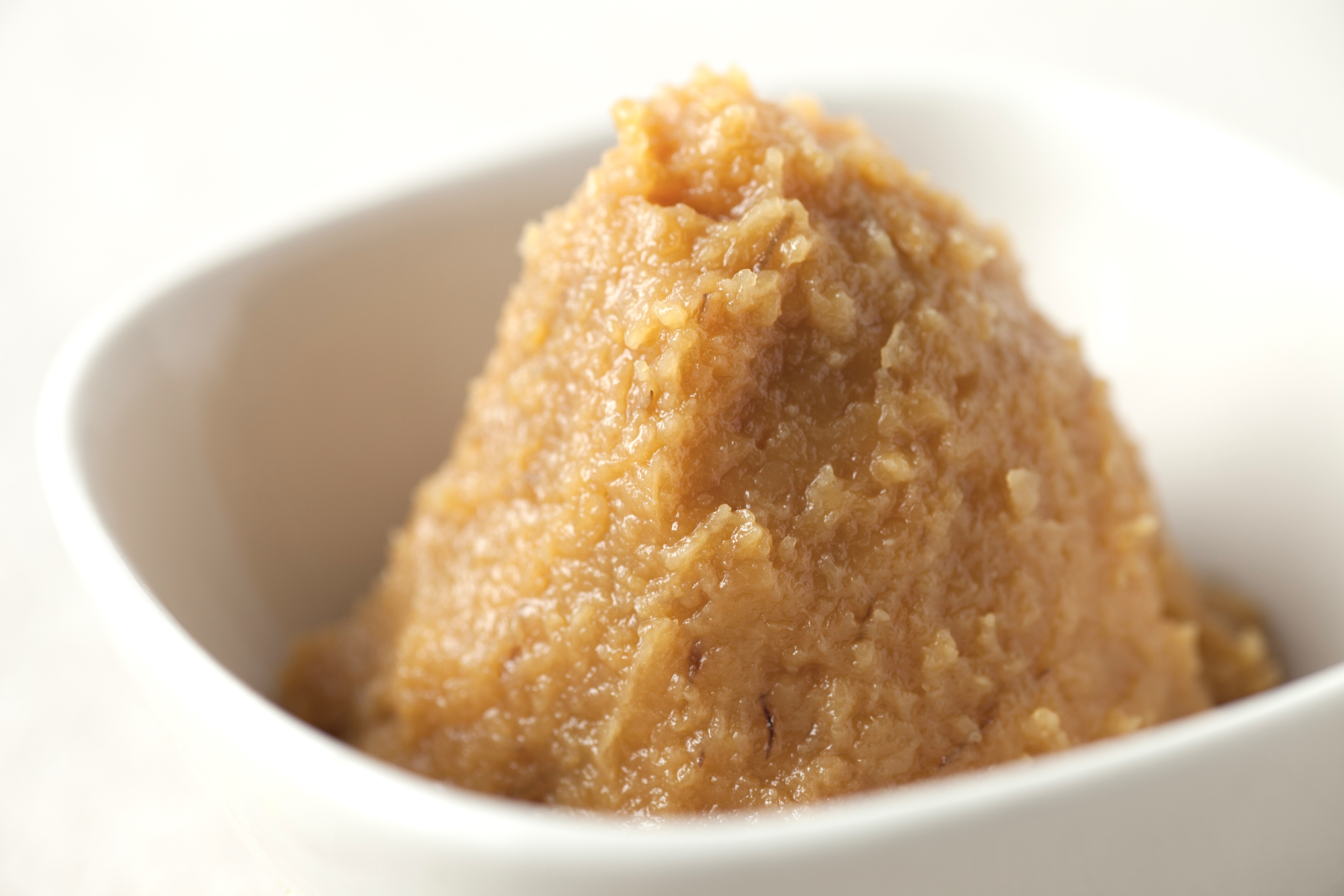
Miso paste

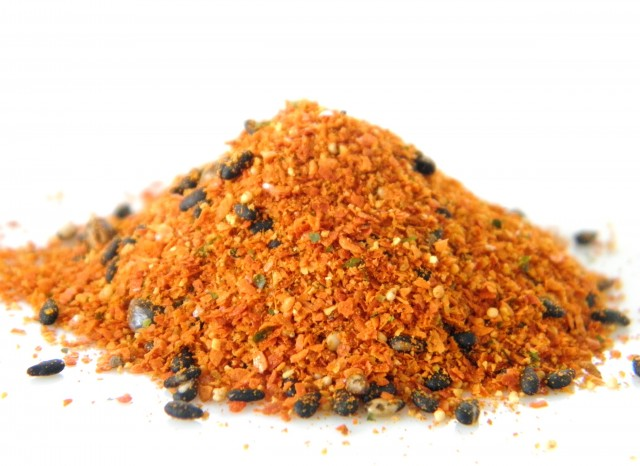
Shichimi tōgarashi

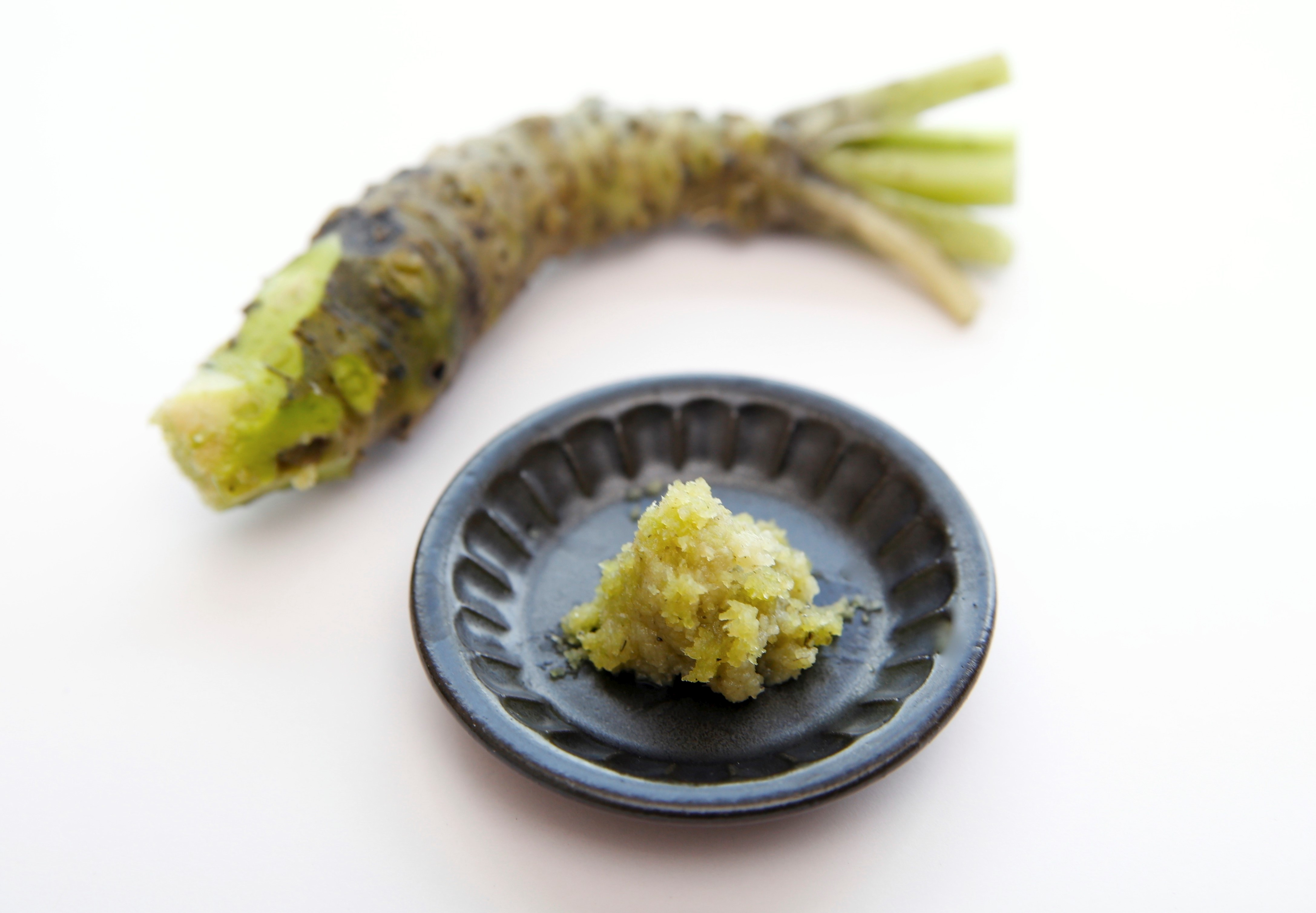
Prepared wasabi

- Black vinegar
- Chili oil
- Dashi
- Fukujinzuke (served with Japanese curry)
- Furikake
- Gomashio
- Karashi
- Katsuobushi
- Kombu
- Mirin
- Miso
- Perilla
- Perilla frutescens
- Ponzu
- Rice vinegar
- Seasoned rice vinegar
- Sesame oil
- Shichimi
- Shiso
- Shottsuru
- Sichuan pepper
- Soy sauce
- Tare sauce
- Wafu dressing
- Wasabi
- Yuzukoshō
- Zanthoxylum piperitum

=== Korea ===
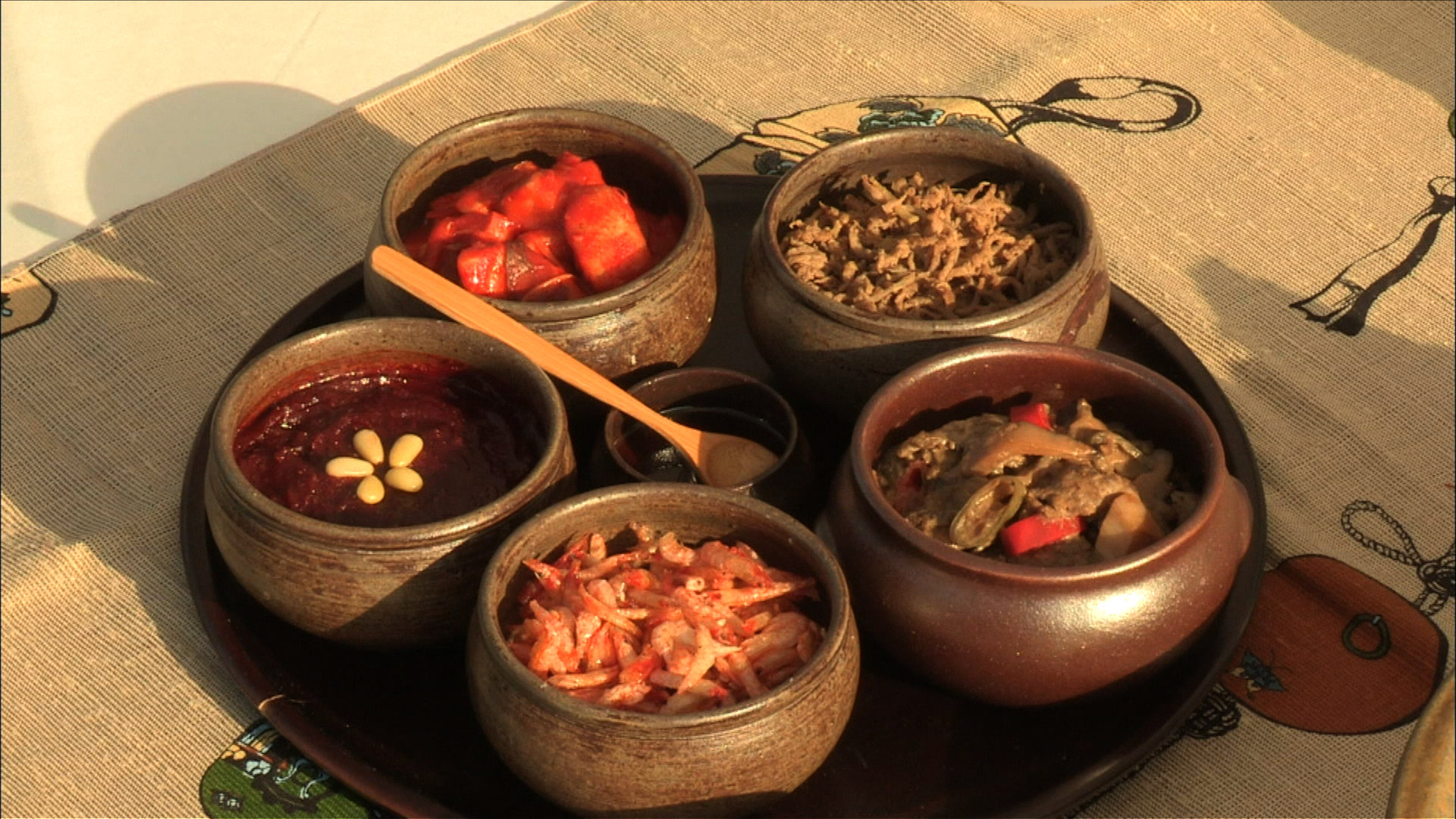
Korean condiments: gochujang, jeotgal (salted seafood), jangajji (pickled vegetables), kimchi

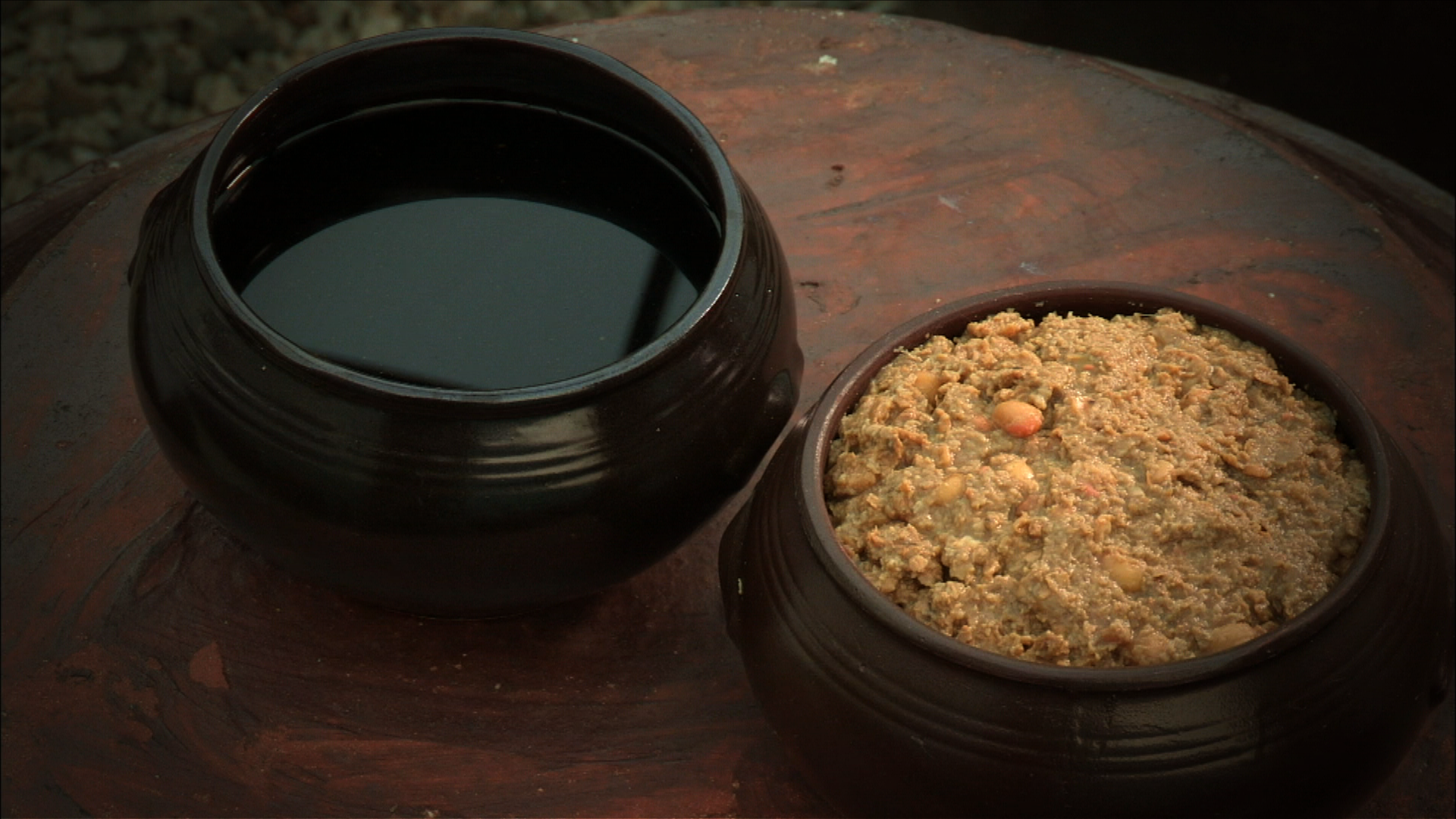
Home-made ganjang (soy sauce) and doenjang (soybean paste)

- Cheong
  - Maesil-cheong
  - Mogwa-cheong
  - Yuja-cheong
- Honey
- Jang
  - Cheonggukjang
  - Doenjang
  - Ganjang
    - Guk-ganjang
    - Eo-ganjang
  - Gochujang
  - Ssamjang
- Jangajji
- Jeotgal
  - Gejang
  - Guljeot
  - Jogi-jeot
  - Myeolchi-jeot
  - Myeongnan-jeot
  - Ojingeo-jeot
  - Saeu-jeot
- Kimchi
  - Baechu-kimchi
  - Baek-kimchi
  - Dongchimi
  - Kkakdugi
  - Nabak-kimchi
  - Pa-kimchi
  - Yeolmu-kimchi
- Mustard
- Perilla oil
- Rice vinegar
- Sesame oil

=== Lebanon ===
- Hummus

=== Malaysia ===
- Bambangan
- Bosou
- Budu
- Kaya
- Tuhau

=== Mexico ===
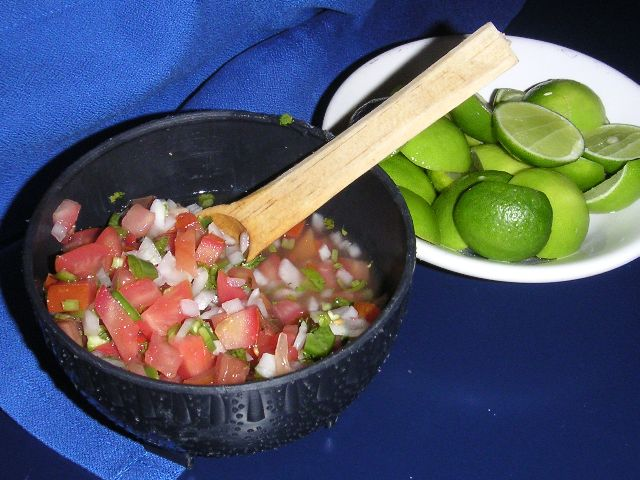
Pico de gallo

- Adobo
- Chamoy
- Mole
- Pico de gallo
- Pipian
- Salsa roja
- Salsa verde

=== Norway ===
- Lingonberry jam

=== Pakistan ===
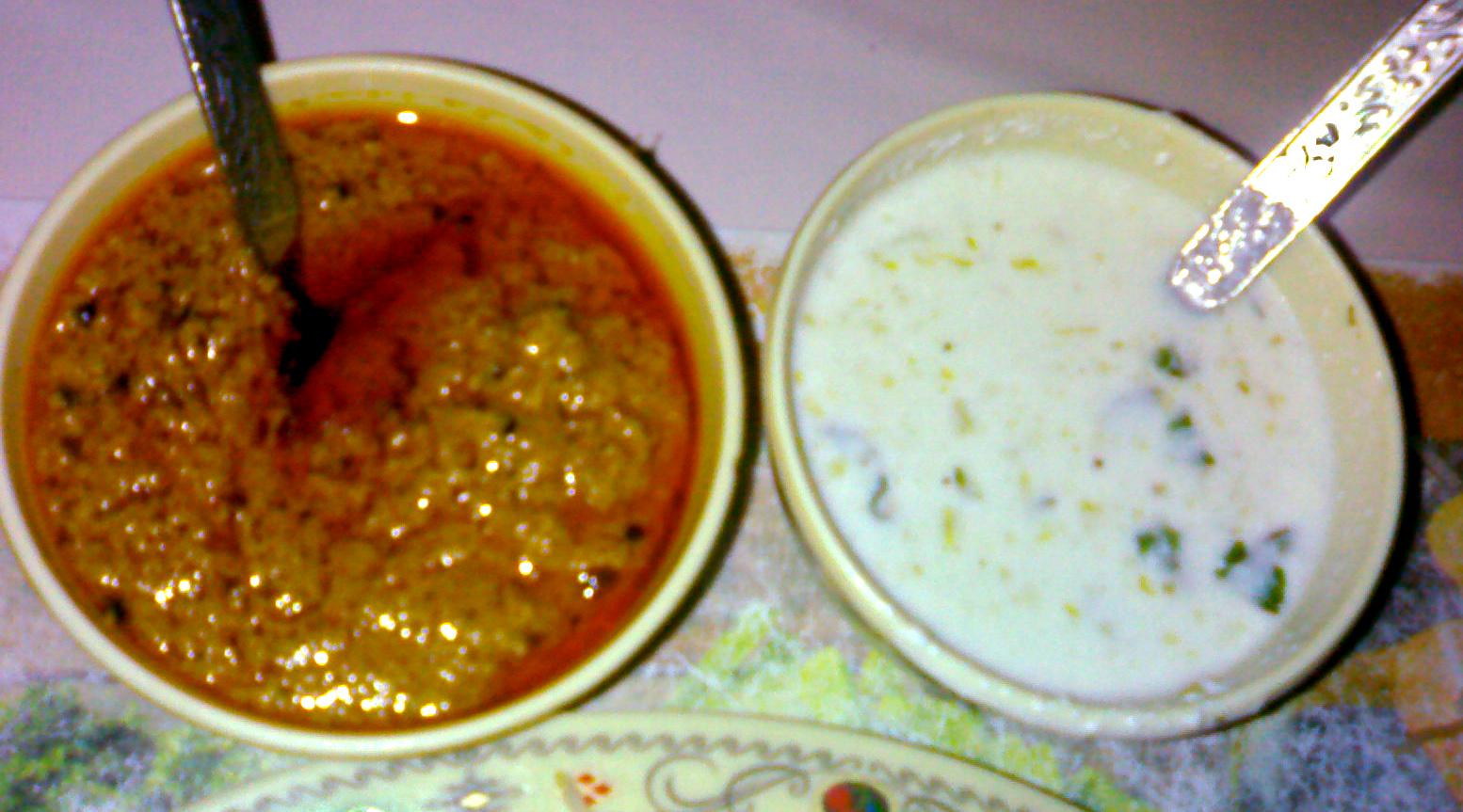
Dahi chutney (at right) with Mirchi ka salan

- Dahi chutney
- Garlic chutney
- Hyderabadi pickle
- Raita

=== Palestine ===
- Qizha

=== Philippines ===
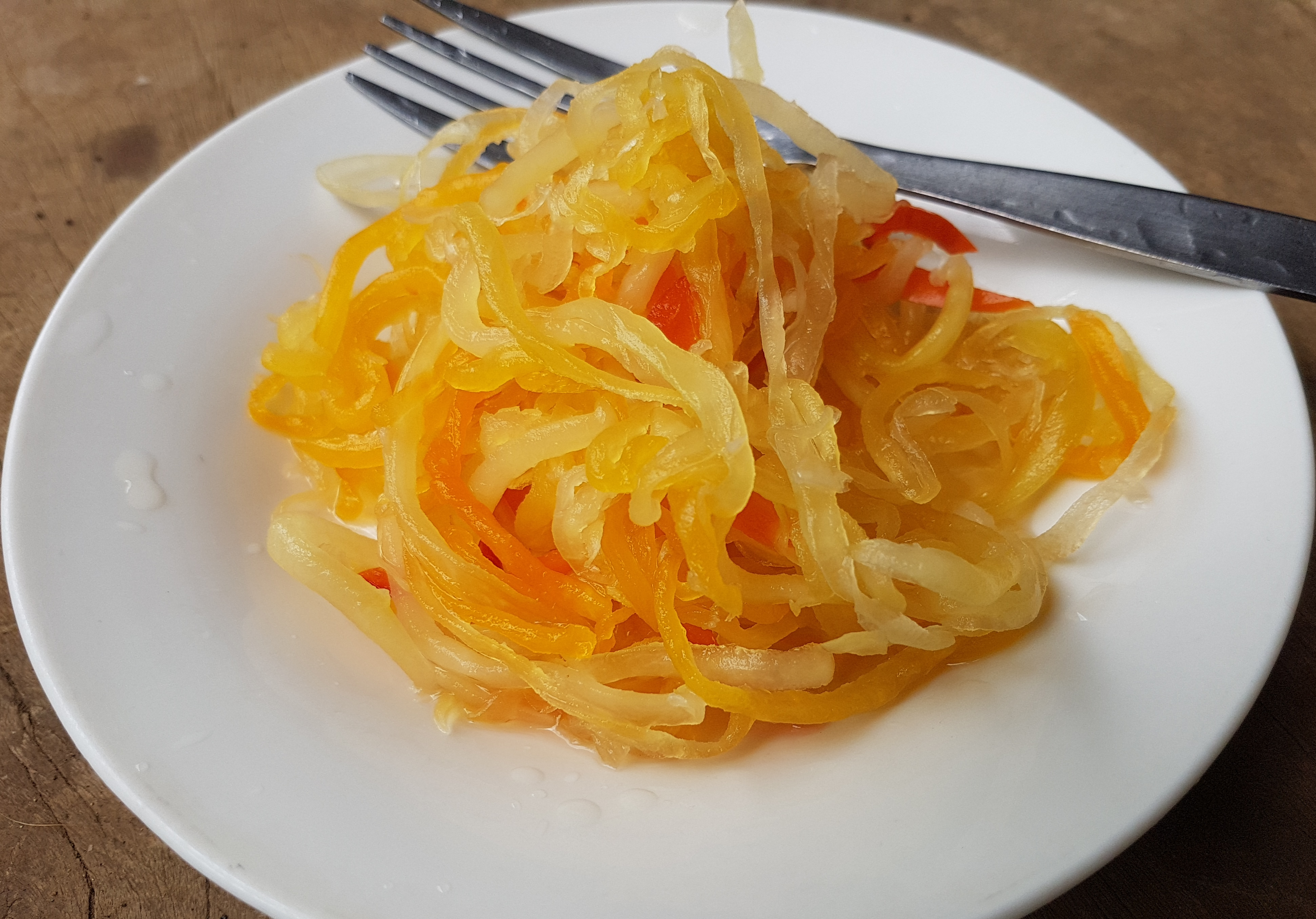
Atchara, made from pickled green papaya

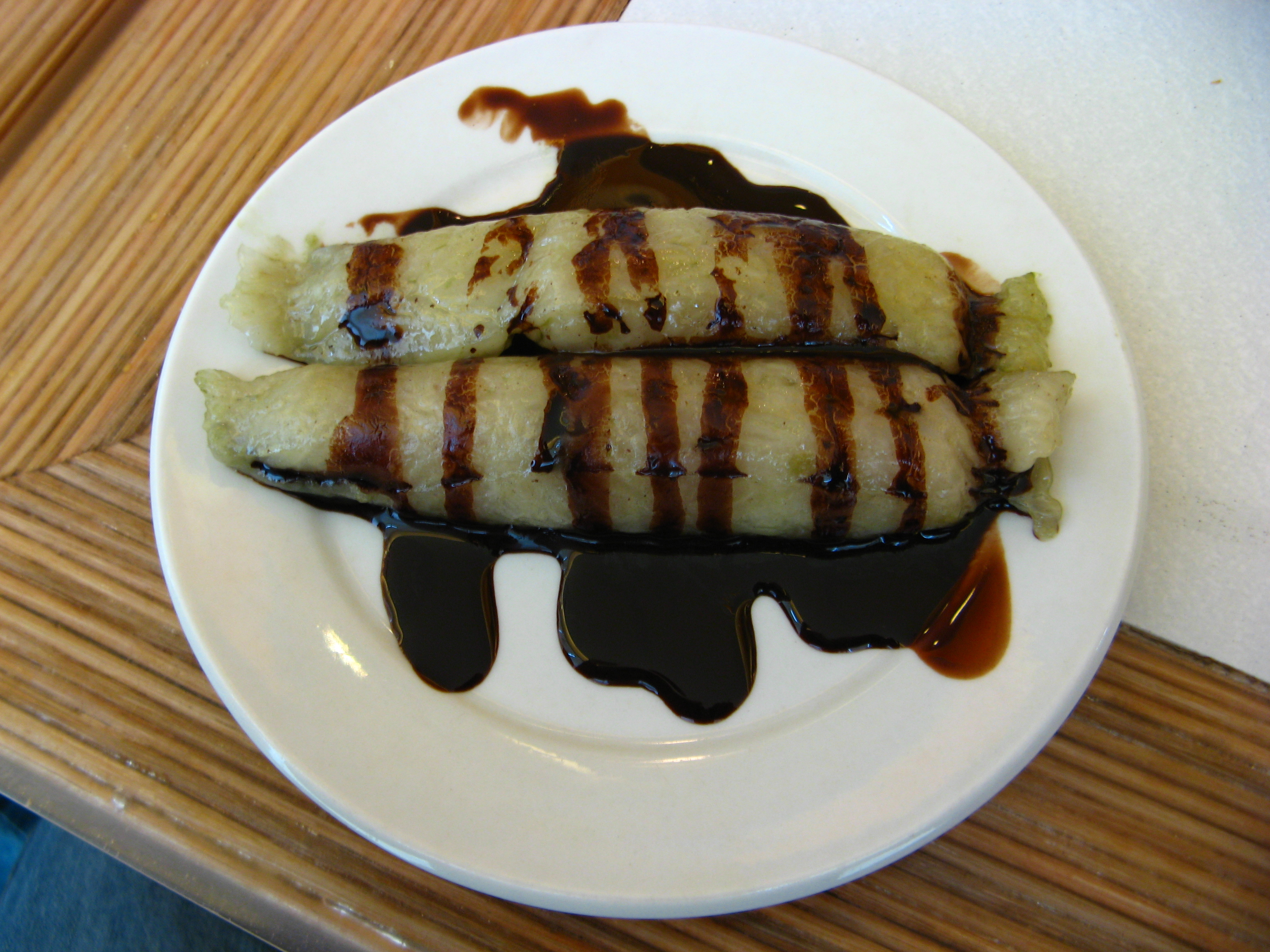
Latik atop cassava suman

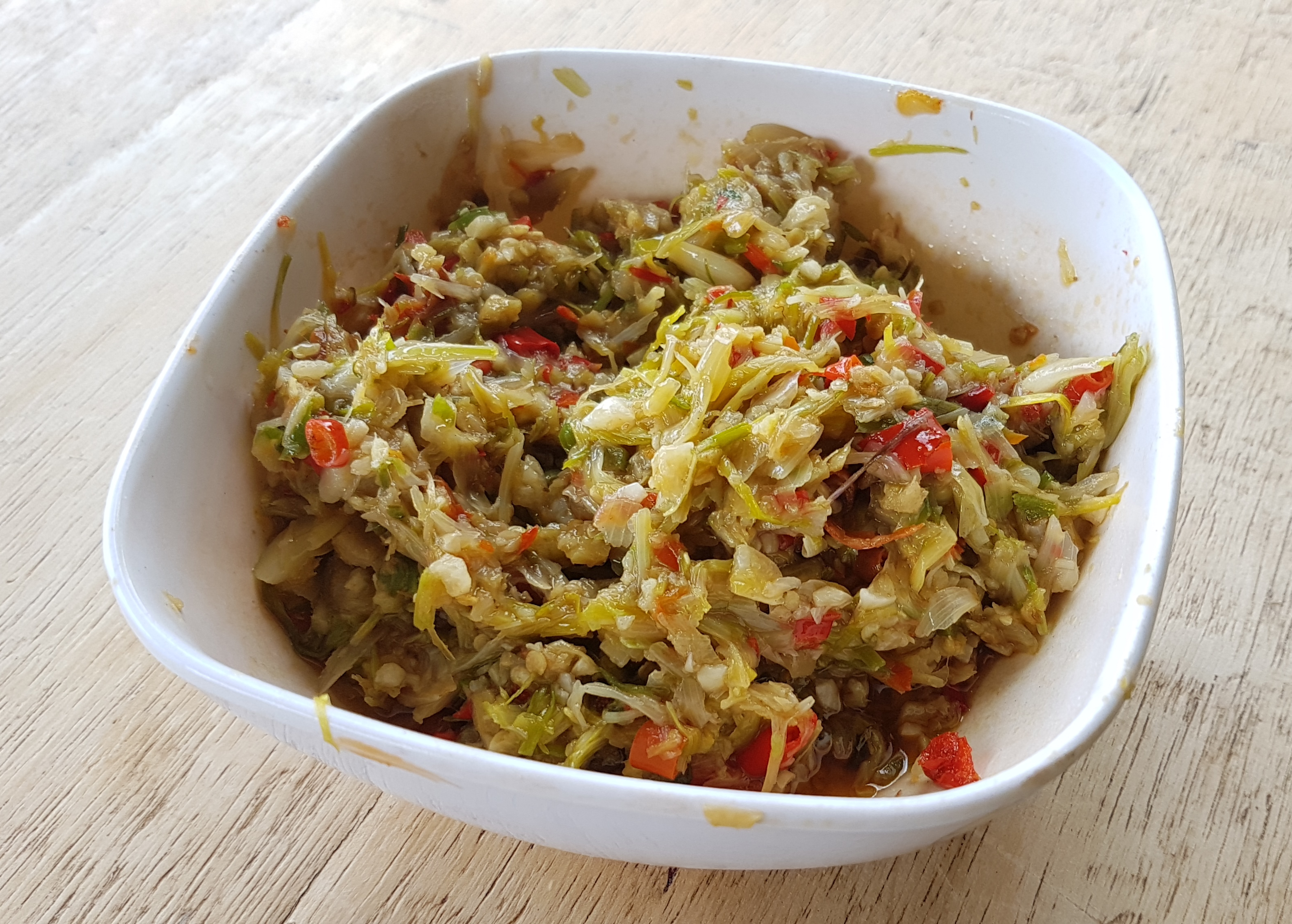
Palapa, a spicy Maranao condiment made from sakurab and various spices

- Agre dulce
- Atchara (pickled green papaya)
  - Atcharang maasim (sour pickles)
  - Atcharang labóng (pickled bamboo shoots)
  - Atcharang dampalit (pickled sea purslane)
  - Atcharang ubod (pickled palm hearts)
- Bagoong
  - Bagoong isda (fermented fish)
  - Bagoong alamang (shrimp paste)
- Banana ketchup
  - Banana ketchup and mayonnaise
  - UFC Catsup
- Buro (tapay, fermented rice)
  - Balao-balao (fermented rice with shrimp)
  - Burong isda (fermented rice with fish)
  - Tinapayan (fermented rice with dried fish)
- Burong mangga (pickled mangoes)
- Burong mustasa (pickled mustard leaves)
- Chili garlic sauce (siomai sauce)
- Latik (coconut caramel)
- Lechon sauce (liver sauce)
- Manong's sauce / Fishball sauce
- Palapa
- Patis (fish sauce)
- Sarsang miso (miso tomato sauce)
- Sarsang talong (eggplant sauce)
- Sawsawan – general term for dipping sauces
- Sinamak (spiced vinegar)
- Suka Pinakurat (spiced vinegar)
- Taba ng talangka (crab paste)
- Toyomansi

=== Russia ===
- Khrenovina sauce – a spicy horseradish sauce
- Mayonnaise

=== Spain ===
- Aioli
- Salsa Romesco

=== Sweden ===
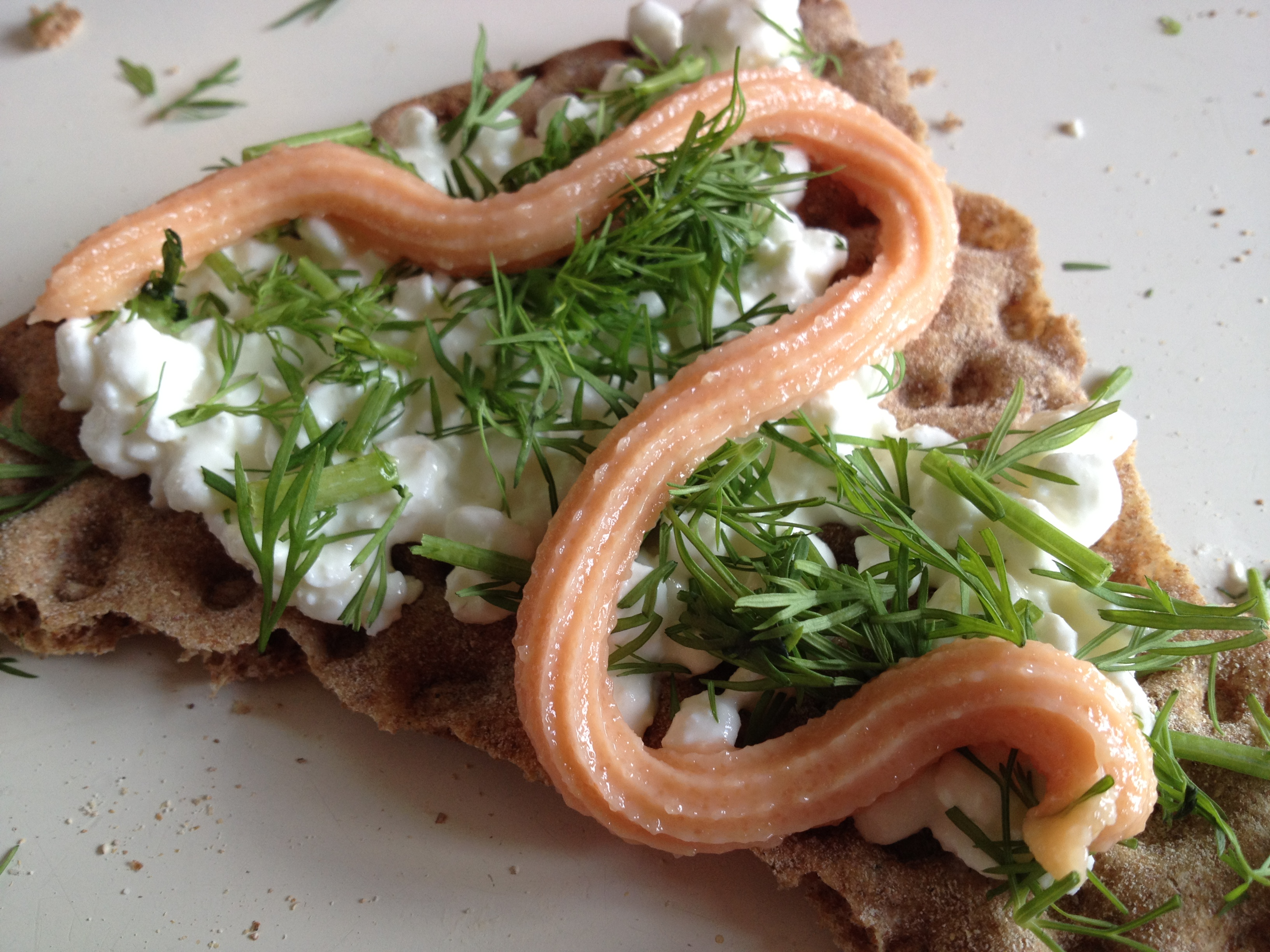
Smörgåskaviar tops a cottage cheese sandwich

- Bostongurka – a relish with pickled gherkins, red bell pepper and onion with spices
- Brown sauce
- Dill
- Gräddfil – a type of fat fermented sour cream
- Hovmästarsås – a mustard dill sauce
- Kalix Löjrom – vendace roe
- Ketchup
- Sweetened lingonberries – raw lingonberries stirred with sugar, served with main courses
- Rhode Island dressing – similar to Thousand Island dressing
- Skagen sauce – made with shrimp, mayonnaise, dill and lemon
- Scanian mustard – with mix of yellow and brown mustard seeds
- Smörgåskaviar – a fish roe spread
- Vanilla sauce
- Äppelmos – apple sauce, served with pork dishes and used on havregrynsgröt

=== Switzerland ===
- Aromat
- Cenovis
- Maggi Würze

=== Taiwan ===
- Maqaw
- Hai Shan sauce
- Taiwanese mayonnaise
- Taiwanese sweet chili sauce

=== Thailand ===
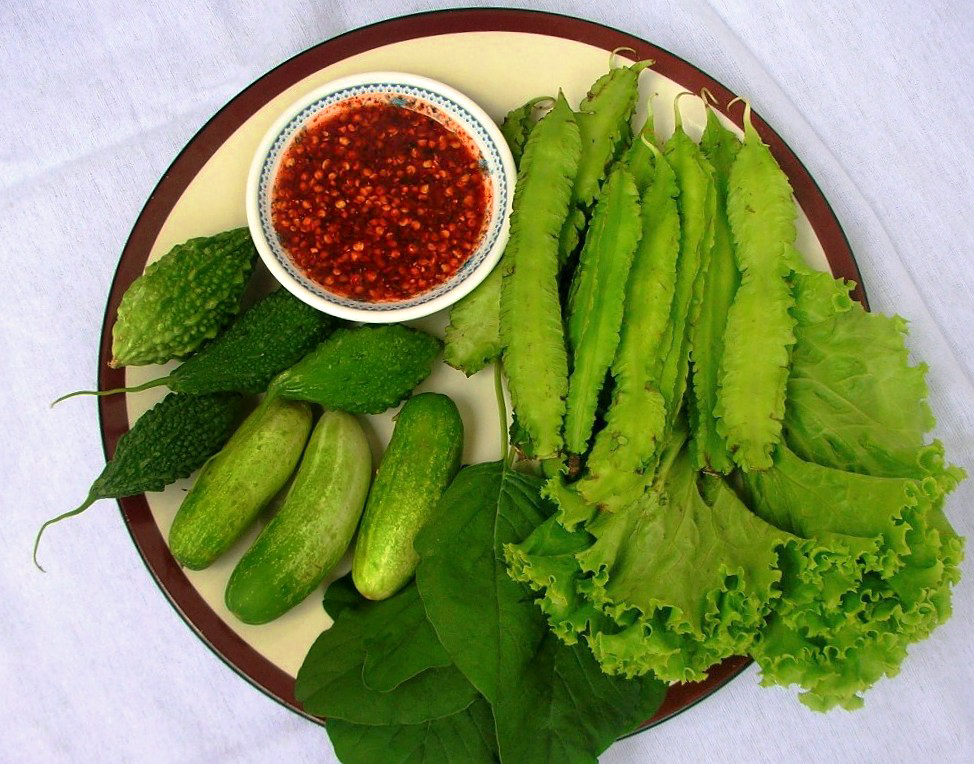
At top is nam phrik pla salat pon, a condiment in Thai cuisine, served here with a selection of raw vegetables in Khorat, Thailand

- Nam chim
- Nam phrik (type of chili sauce)
- Nam pla (fish sauce)
- Nam man hoi (oyster sauce)

=== Trinidad and Tobago ===
- Kuchela
- Lime pepper sauce
- Mother-in-law – a pepper sauce made with scotch bonnet peppers, carrots, caralie, shado beni, garlic, onions, salt and lime juice.

=== United Kingdom ===
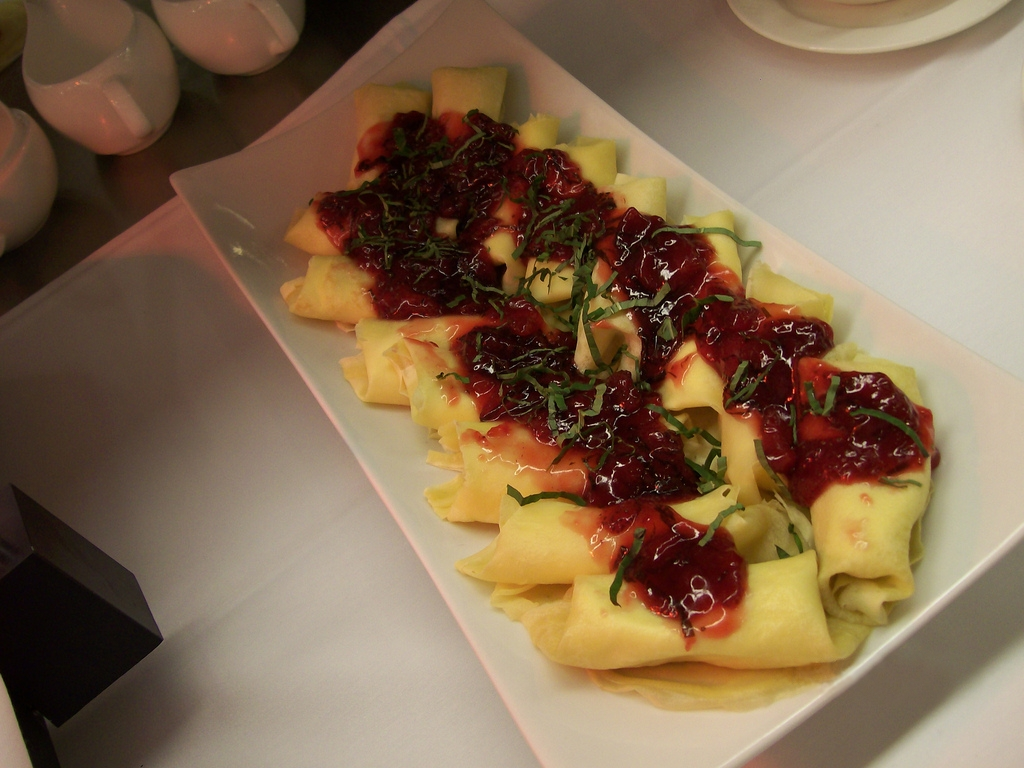
Cumberland sauce atop duck confit crepes

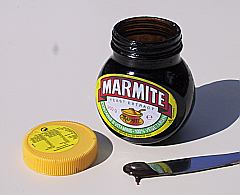
Marmite

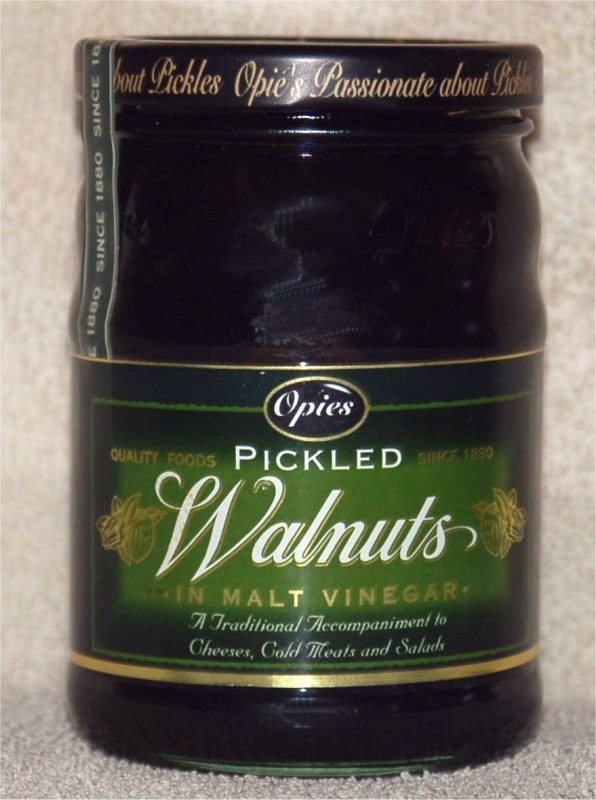
A mass-produced brand of pickled walnuts

- Albert sauce
- Branston
- Brown sauce
- Cheddar sauce
- Colman's
- Crosse & Blackwell
- Cumberland sauce
- Daddies
- Gentleman's Relish
- Halford Leicestershire Table Sauce
- Haywards pickles
- Henderson's Relish
- Hill, Evans & Co
- HP Sauce
- Keen's
- Ketchup
- Lemons
- Marie Rose sauce
- Marmite
- Mint sauce
- Mushy peas
- Mustard
- Non-brewed condiment
- OK Sauce
- Piccalilli
- Pickled walnuts
- Poacher's relish
- Redcurrant sauce
- Salad cream
- Sarson's
- Steak sauce
- Tewkesbury mustard
- Whisky sauce
- Worcestershire sauce

=== United States ===
- Barbecue sauce
- Carolina style condiments
- Comeback sauce
- Cranberry sauce
- Fry sauce
- Ketchup
- Mayonnaise
- Mumbo sauce
- Old Sour
- Relish
- Peanut butter
- Ranch dressing

=== Vietnam ===
- Nước chấm

== See also ==
- Cruet-stand
- Garnish
- Ketchup as a vegetable
- National Mustard Museum
- Sachet
- Salt and pepper shakers
- Seasoning
- Spice

=== List articles ===
- List of brand name condiments
- List of chutneys
- List of accompaniments to french fries
- List of food pastes
- List of mayonnaises
- List of pickled foods
- List of sauces
- List of spreads
- List of syrups
