= Halford Leicestershire Table Sauce =

19th-century condiment

- Advertisement for the sauce, in an ad from 1871
- Product type: Condiment
- Produced by: William Halford
- Country: Leicestershire, England

Halford Leicestershire Table Sauce, also known as Halford sauce or Leicestershire sauce, used to be a commonly used sauce in the United States. The product was similar to Worcestershire sauce, with some recipes of the time using it interchangeably.

Bottled in England, this sauce was imported to the United States via Boston. While the company producing it went out of business, because of its previously ubiquitous status in the late 19th century, its bottles are still considered collectable today.

== See also ==
- List of condiments
- List of sauces
