= Old sour =

Fermented key lime juice used in sauces

Old Sour is a sauce, ingredient, and salad dressing used in the Bahamas and Key West, Florida. Old Sour sauce originated in the Bahamas, and is most often prepared using Key lime juice, salt, and bird peppers. Historically, in both Key West and the Caribbean, it was also prepared using sour oranges. The sauce may have been developed to preserve both lime and orange juice for use out of season or off-shore.

Old Sour is most popularly made from an aged (fermented) mixture of Key lime juice, bird peppers, and salt. Old Sour has a salty and acidic flavor. It is notably prepared using a glass or non-metal bowl so as to prevent the citrus flavor from taking on a "metallic" taste. Hot sauce is sometimes used to add additional flavor.

In traditional Key West cooking, Old Sour is used for a variety of dishes including seafood, fried foods, and Key lime pie.

== See also ==
- Switcha
- List of sauces
- List of condiments
