= Albert sauce =

British condiment

Albert sauce is a sauce used principally in British cuisine to enhance the flavour of braised beef. It consists of grated horseradish in a clear bouillon, thickened with cream and egg yolks, and spiced with a little prepared mustard diluted in vinegar.

It is commonly believed to be named after Prince Albert, Queen Victoria's prince consort. The origin of the name is debated as there is no proof. Other etymological theories exist, with some claiming the name originated as early as the 16th century.
