= Ginger pickle =

Pickle eaten in Andhra Pradesh, India

- Place of origin: India
- Main ingredients: Ginger

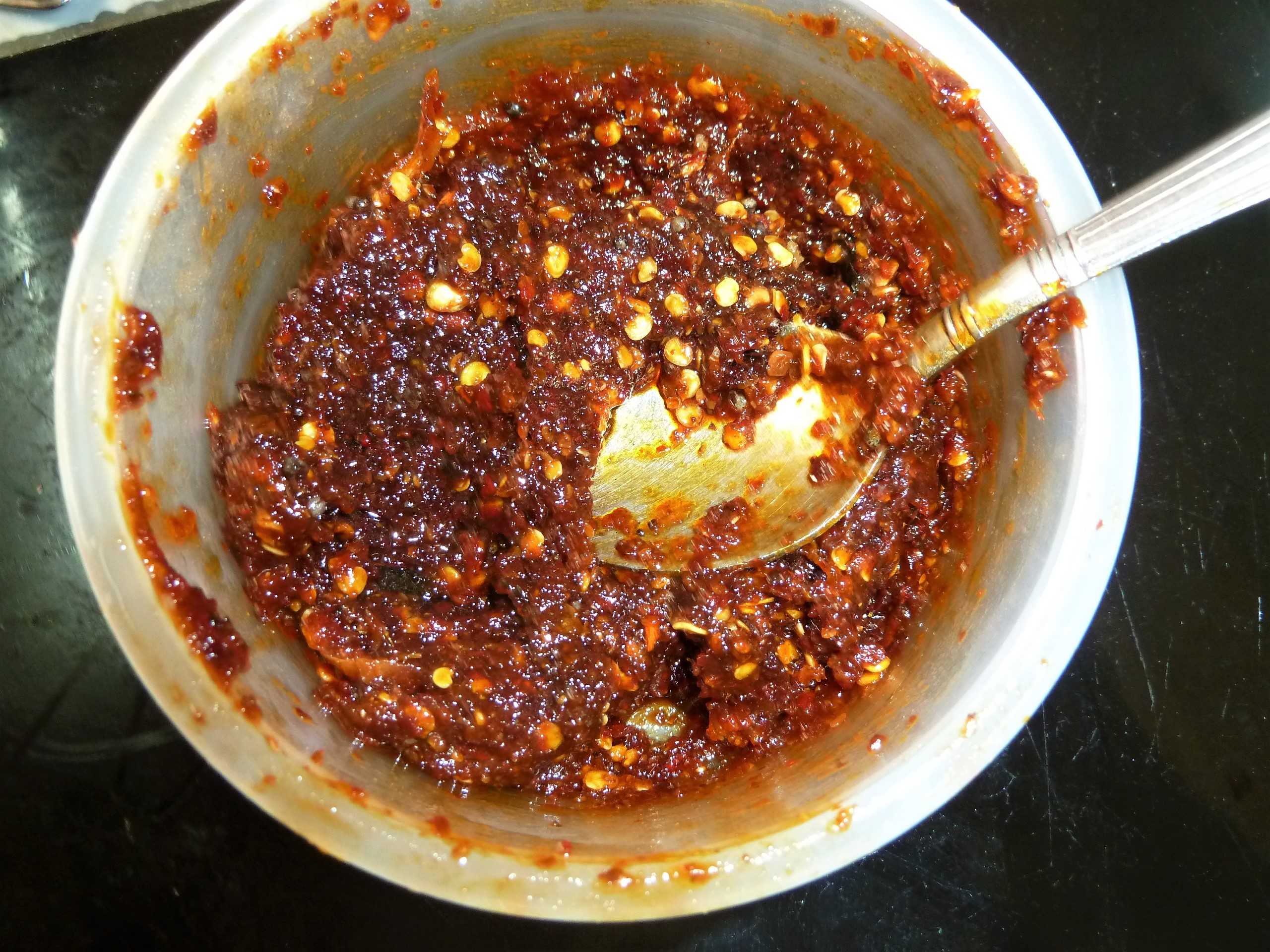
Ginger pickle

Ginger pickle is a very popular pickle in Andhra Pradesh, India. This spicy pickle is also available commercially. Ginger is widely used in Asian and Indian cuisine. The pickles are prepared by peeling and crushing ginger and mixing with tamarind pulp and seasoning with mustard seeds.
