= Skyronnes =

Icelandic dipping sauces

Skyronnes are Icelandic dipping sauces made out of skyr instead of mayonnaise.

They are usually served with fish and chips.
