= List of Pakistani condiments =

The following is a partial list of condiments used in Pakistani cuisine:

== Achars ==
Achar are made from certain varieties of vegetables and fruits that are finely chopped and marinated in brine or edible oils along with various spices. Some varieties of fruits and vegetables are small enough to be used whole. Some regions also specialize in pickling meats and fish.

- Carrot achar
- Cauliflower achar
- Garlic achar
- Gongura achar
- Green chilli achar
- Hyderabadi pickle
- Lemon achar
- Mango achar

== Chutneys ==
Chutney is a family of condiments associated with South Asian cuisine made from a highly variable mixture of spices, vegetables, or fruit.

- Cilantro chutney (coriander leaves)
- Coconut chutney
- Garlic chutney (made from fresh garlic, coconut and groundnut)
- Lime chutney (made from whole, unripe limes)
- Mango (keri) chutney (made from unripe, green mangoes)
- Mentha chutney
- Onion chutney
- Tamarind chutney (Imli chutney)
- Tomato chutney

== Sauces ==
- Raita (a cucumber yogurt dip)

== See also ==
- List of condiments
- List of Pakistani spices
