= List of Indian condiments =

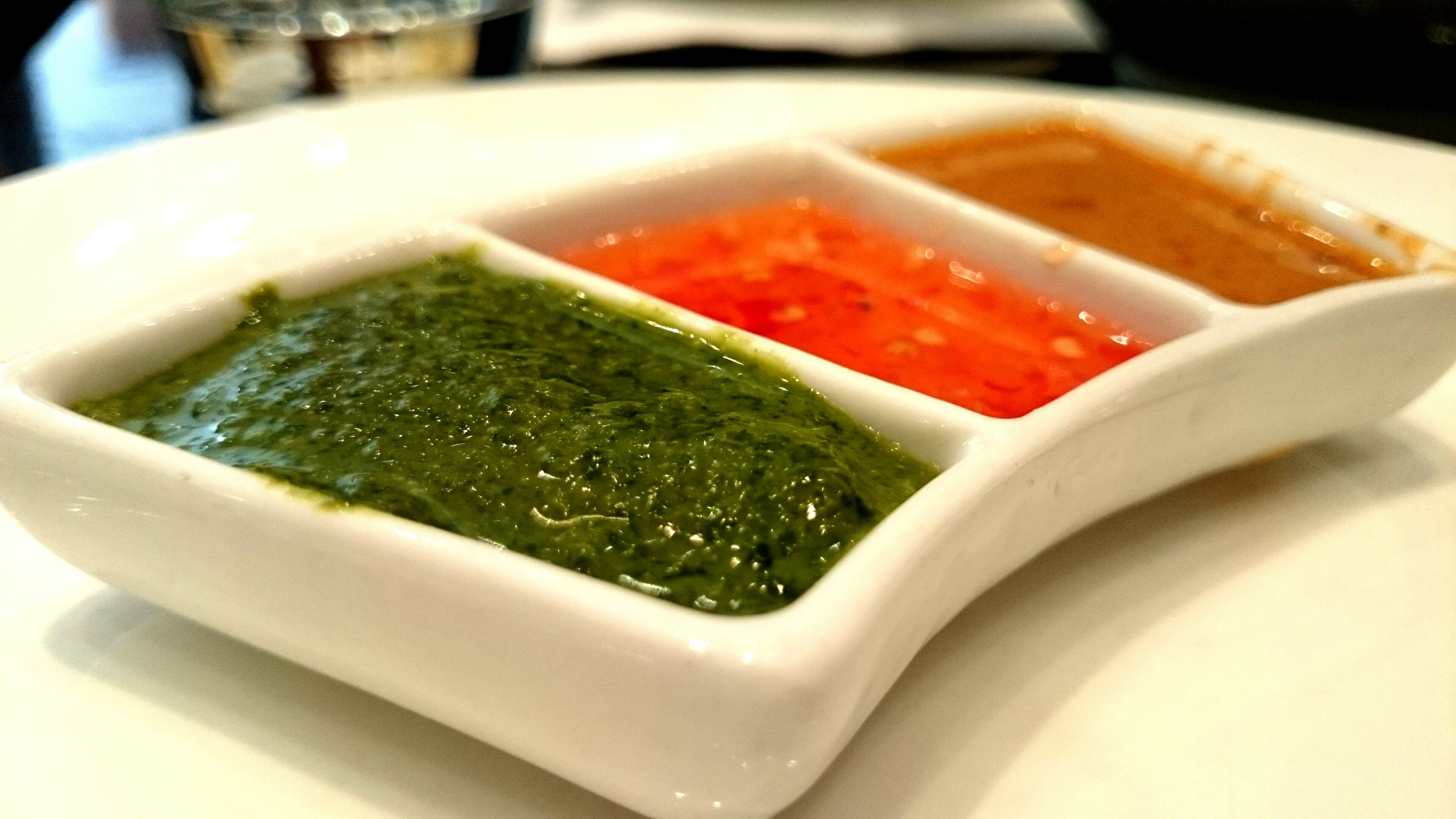
Three Indian chutneys

The following is a list of condiments used in Indian cuisine.

== Dried powders ==
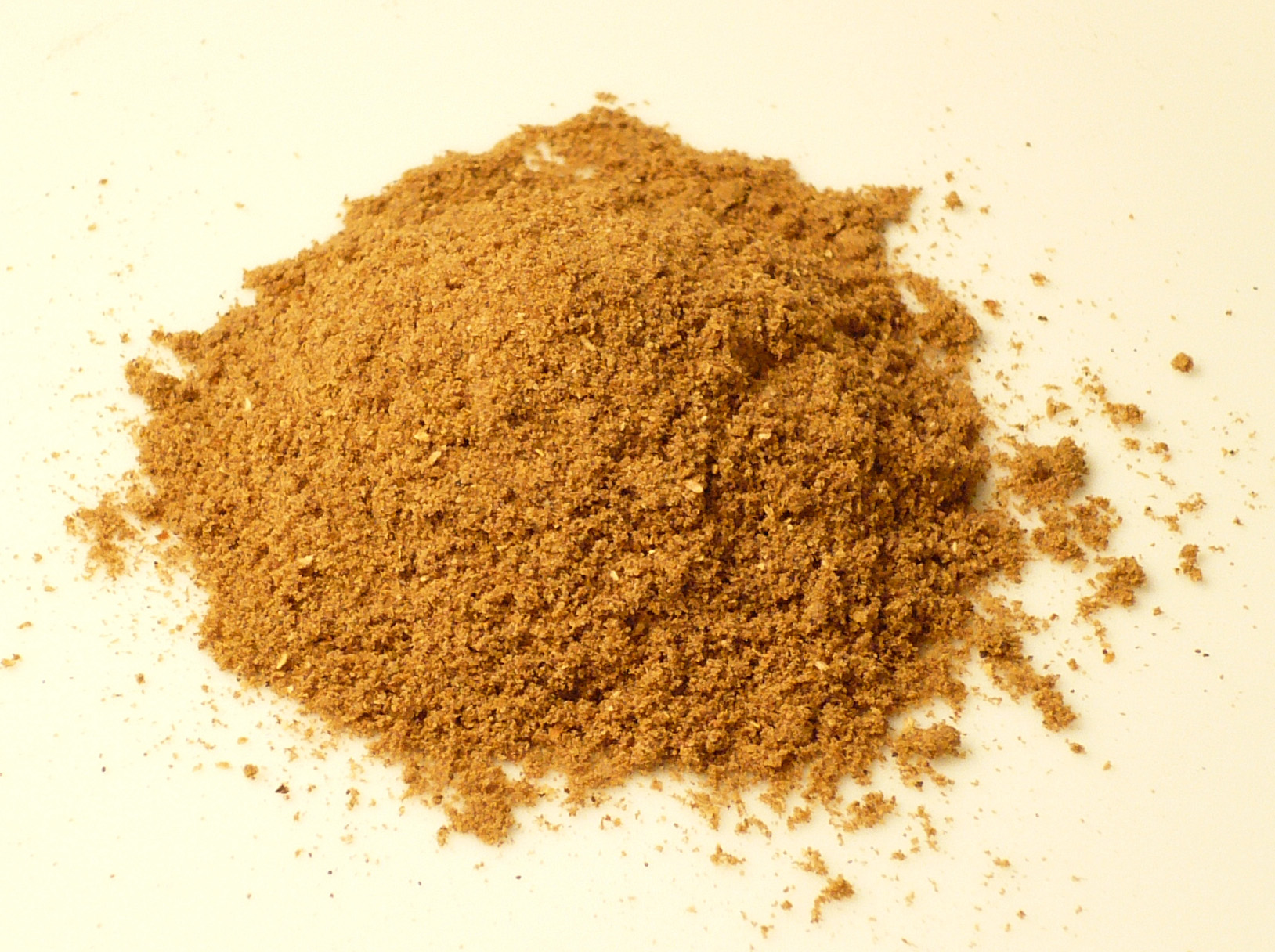
A garam masala

- Ajwain
- Asafetida
- Black salt
- Cardamom powder
- Red chili powder
- Coriander powder
- Curry leaves
- Garam masala
- Ginger, ginger powder
- Himalayan salt
- Jira (Indian cumin seeds)
- Raai
- Turmeric

== Chutneys ==
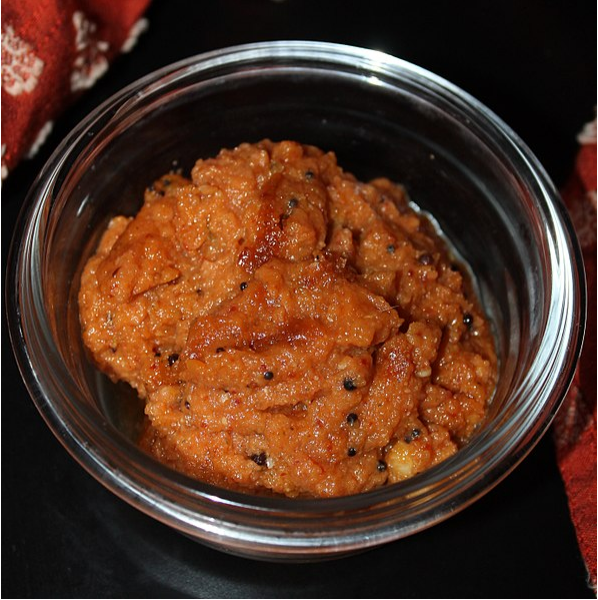
A garlic chutney in South India prepared using red chili pepper

- Chammanthi podi
- Coriander chutney
- Coconut chutney
- Garlic chutney (made from fresh garlic, coconut and groundnut)
- Hang curd hari mirch pudina chutney (typical north Indian)
- Lime chutney (made from whole, unripe limes)
- Mango chutney (keri) chutney (made from unripe, green mangoes)
- Mint chutney
- Onion chutney
- Saunth chutney (made from dried ginger and tamarind paste)
- Tamarind chutney (Imli chutney)
- Tomato chutney

== Sauces ==
- Raita (a cucumber curd side-dish)

== See also ==
- List of condiments
- Achar
