= Indian relish =

Indian relish may be any of several condiments accompanying curries and other dishes:

1. a chutney, fruits or vegetables cooked to a thick paste with sugar and vinegar
2. a South Asian pickle, a highly-spiced mix of fruits or vegetables
3. a raita, chopped vegetables in yoghurt
