= Garlic chutney =

Chutney originating from the Indian subcontinent

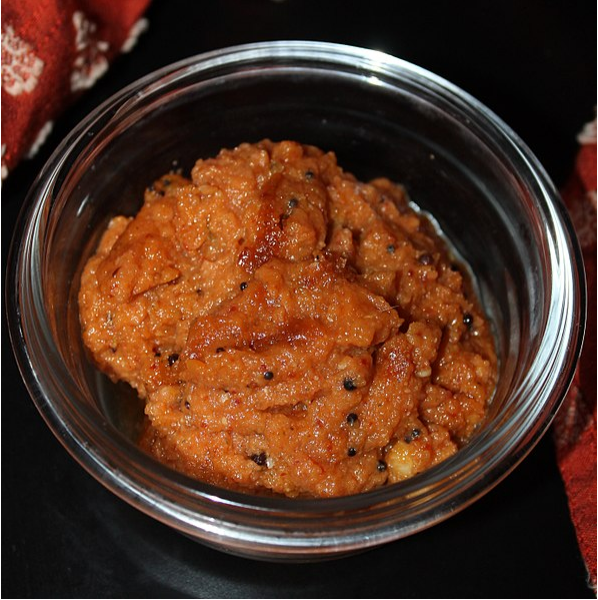
- A garlic chutney in South India prepared using red chili pepper
- Type: Condiment
- Place of origin: Indian subcontinent
- Region or state: Indian subcontinent and Tibet
- Associated cuisine: India, Bangladesh, Pakistan, Nepal
- Main ingredients: Garlic, coconut, peanuts, chili peppers
- Variations: Dahi chutney, Raita

Garlic chutney, also referred to as lahsun chutney, lahsun ki chutney, lehsun chutney and bellulli chutney, is a chutney, originating from the Indian subcontinent, made from fresh garlic, dry or fresh coconut, groundnuts and green or red chili peppers. Cumin and tamarind are also sometimes used as ingredients. It is prepared in both wet and dried forms. The wet variety is made with fresh grated coconut and is typically served immediately after preparation.

== Dry variety ==
The dry variety is a commercial product purveyed in packets and jars. Homemade dried garlic chutney can be stored in bottles and will last up to four weeks. When refrigerated, it can be kept for up to six months. It is eaten either dry or mixed with yogurt, curd, buttermilk or vegetable oil. It is sometimes prepared in a powdered form.

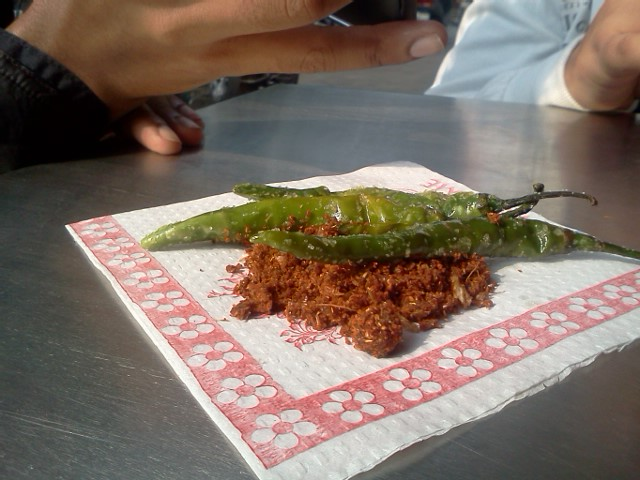
Dry garlic chutney prepared with red chili pepper

== Uses ==
Garlic chutney is used for cooking in many Indian (especially Maharashtra, Gujarat, Punjab, Rajasthan and northern Karnataka) and Pakistani homes. It is often eaten with fresh, hot bhakri (a flat, unleavened roti made from flour of grains such as jowar (sorghum), bajra (pearl millet), nachni (finger millet), etc.). Garlic chutney is sometimes served as an accompaniment to chaats and khandvi.

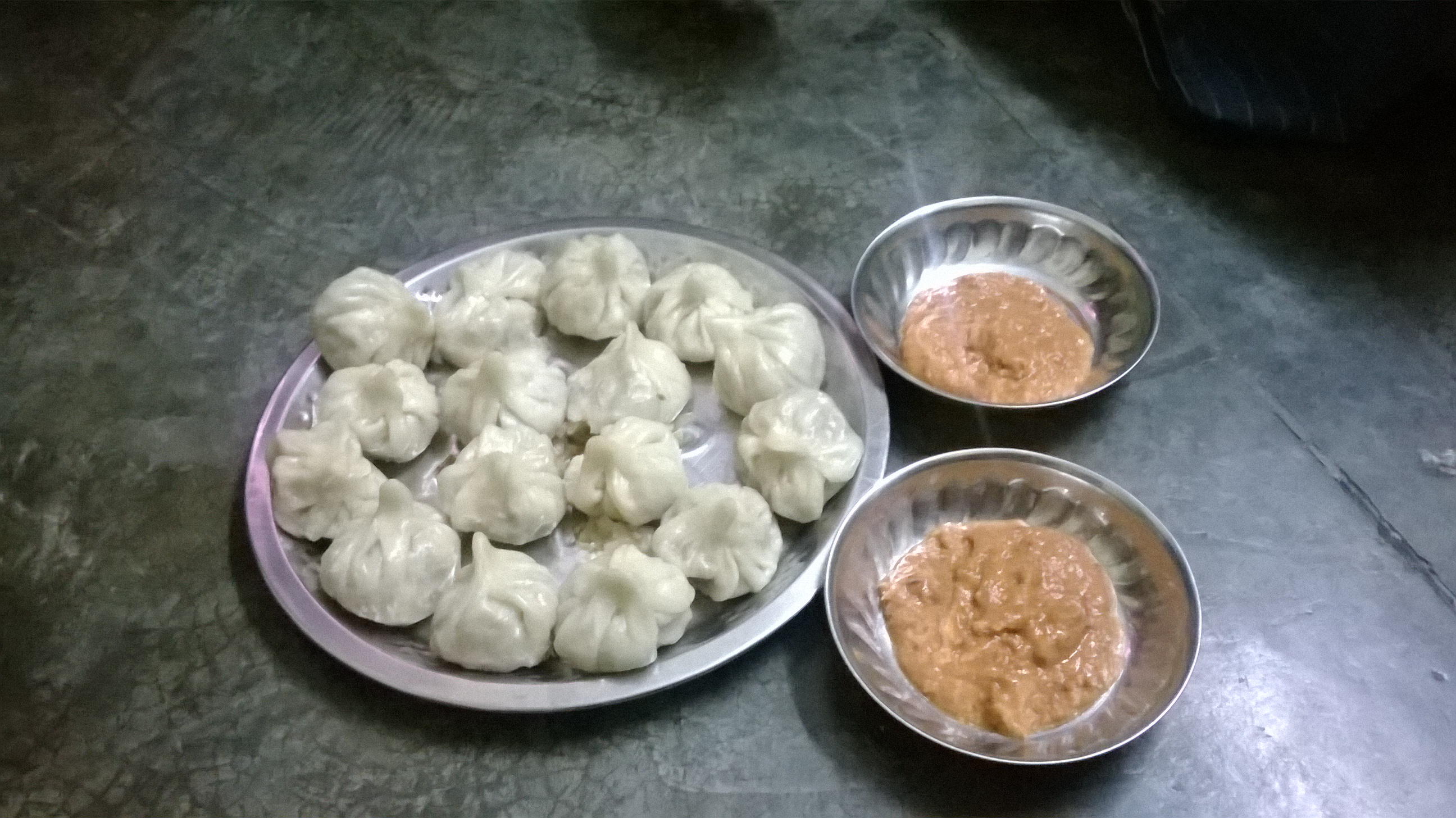
Momos with garlic chutney

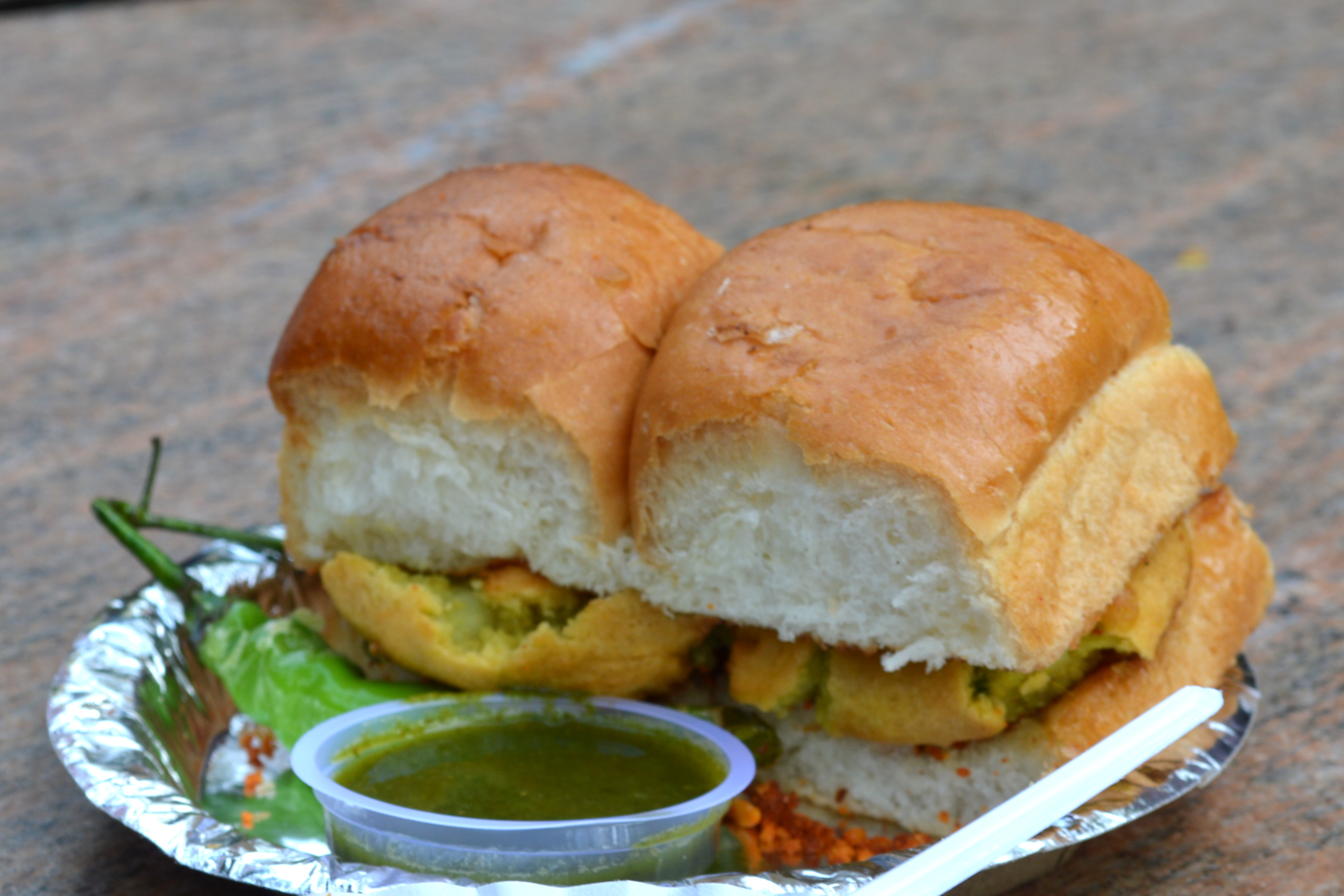
Vada pav served with a side of green chili pepper garlic chutney

== See also ==
- List of chutneys
- List of garlic dishes
- List of Indian condiments
- List of Pakistani condiments
