= Chammanthi podi =

Dry condiment

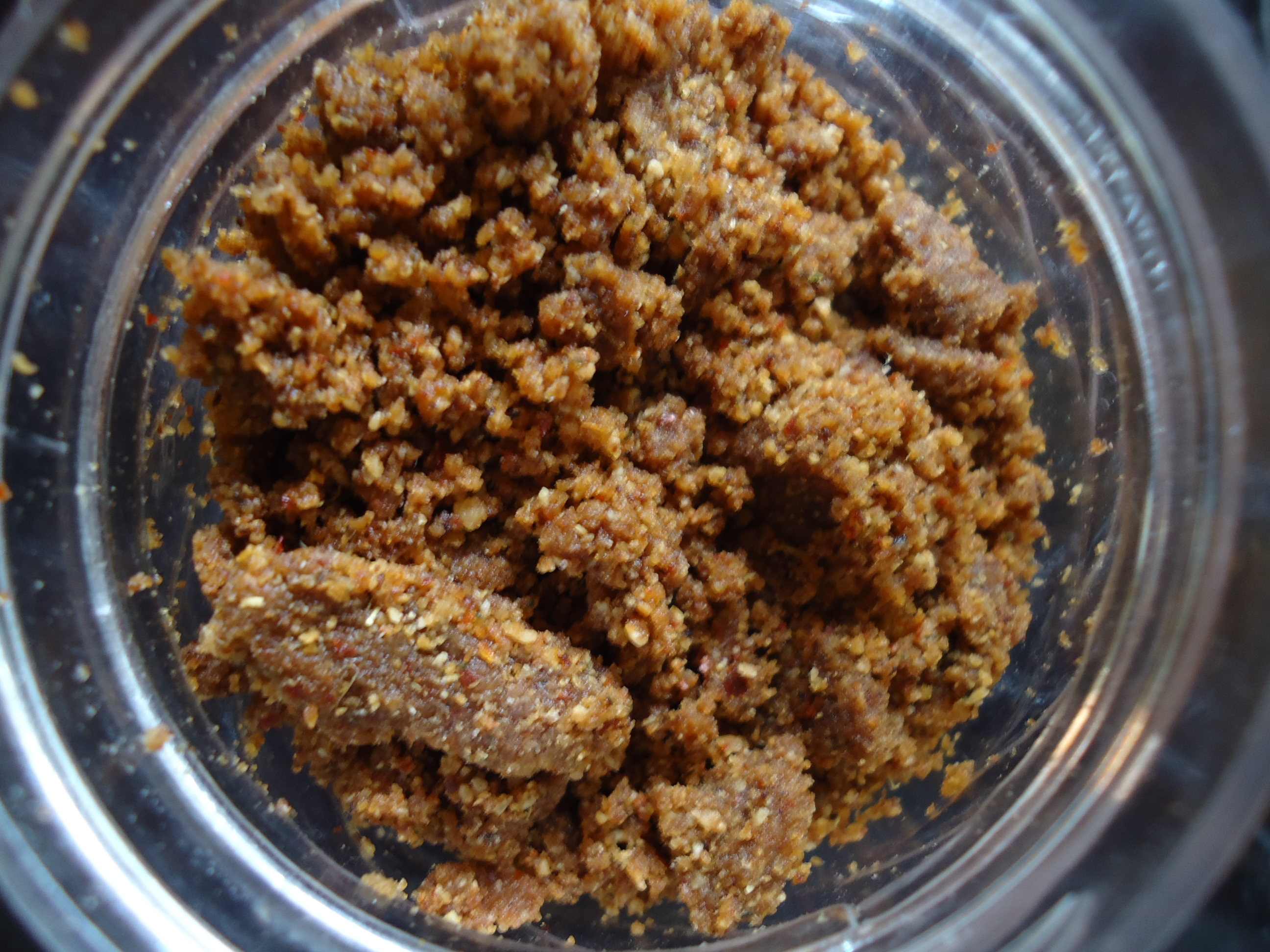
- Chutney Powder
- Alternative names: chammanthi powder
- Course: condiment
- Place of origin: India
- Region or state: Kerala
- Serving temperature: cool
- Main ingredients: coconut, shallots, curry leaves, coriander, dry chillies

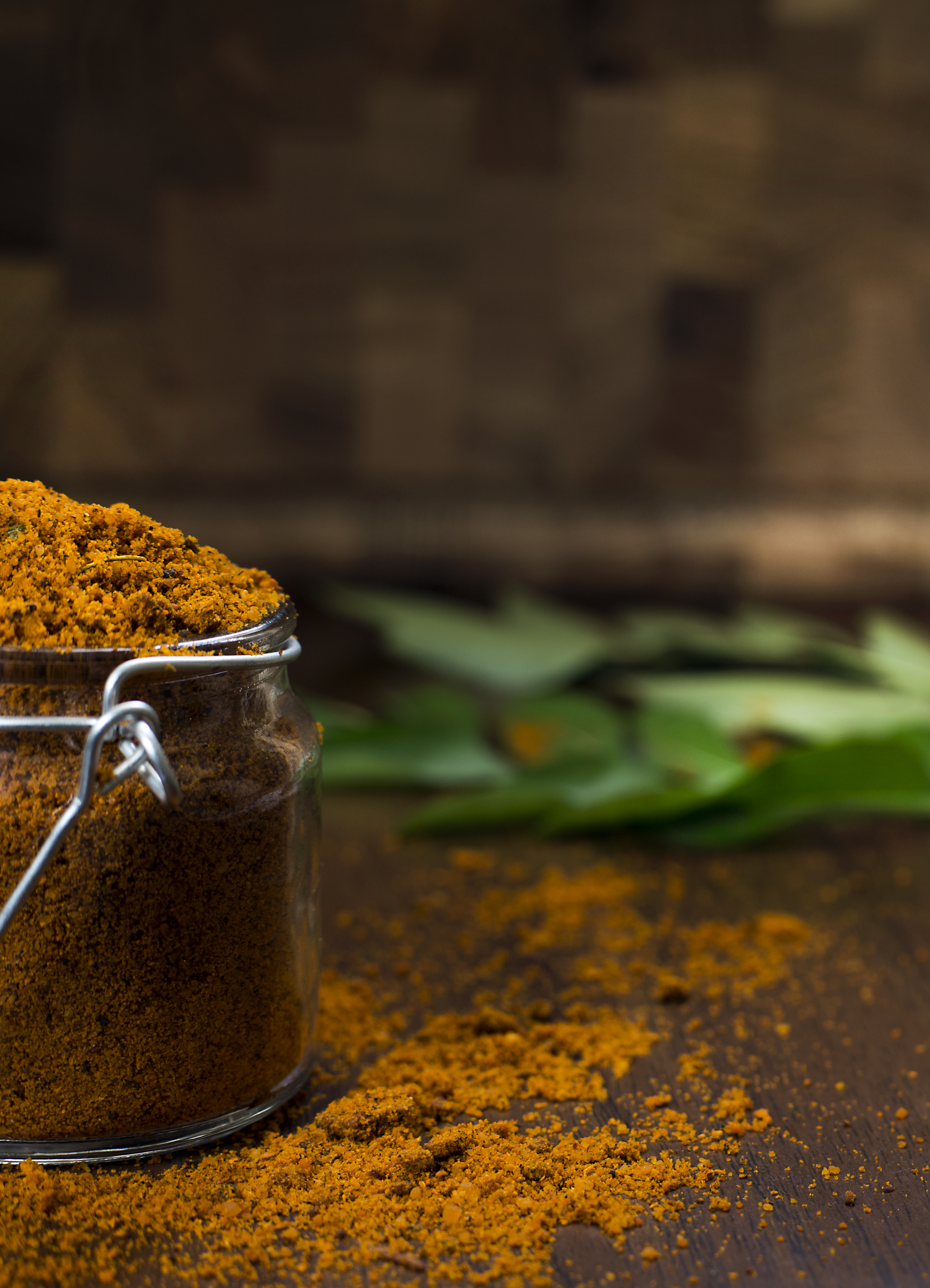
Chutney powder in a bottle

Chammanthi Podi is a dry condiment and chutney from the South Indian state of Kerala. Usually, regular coconut chutneys would spoil the same day without refrigeration, so making Chammanthi Podi was a way to preserve the chutney for months.

To make chammanthi podi, shredded coconut and spices are dry-roasted in a pan to evaporate the moisture from the mixture. Then the mixture is ground up and stored to be used later. The word chammanthi means chutney or sauce, and the word podi means powder (in Malayalam).

== See also ==
- List of chutneys
- List of condiments
- List of Indian condiments
