= Chukauni =

Nepalese salad

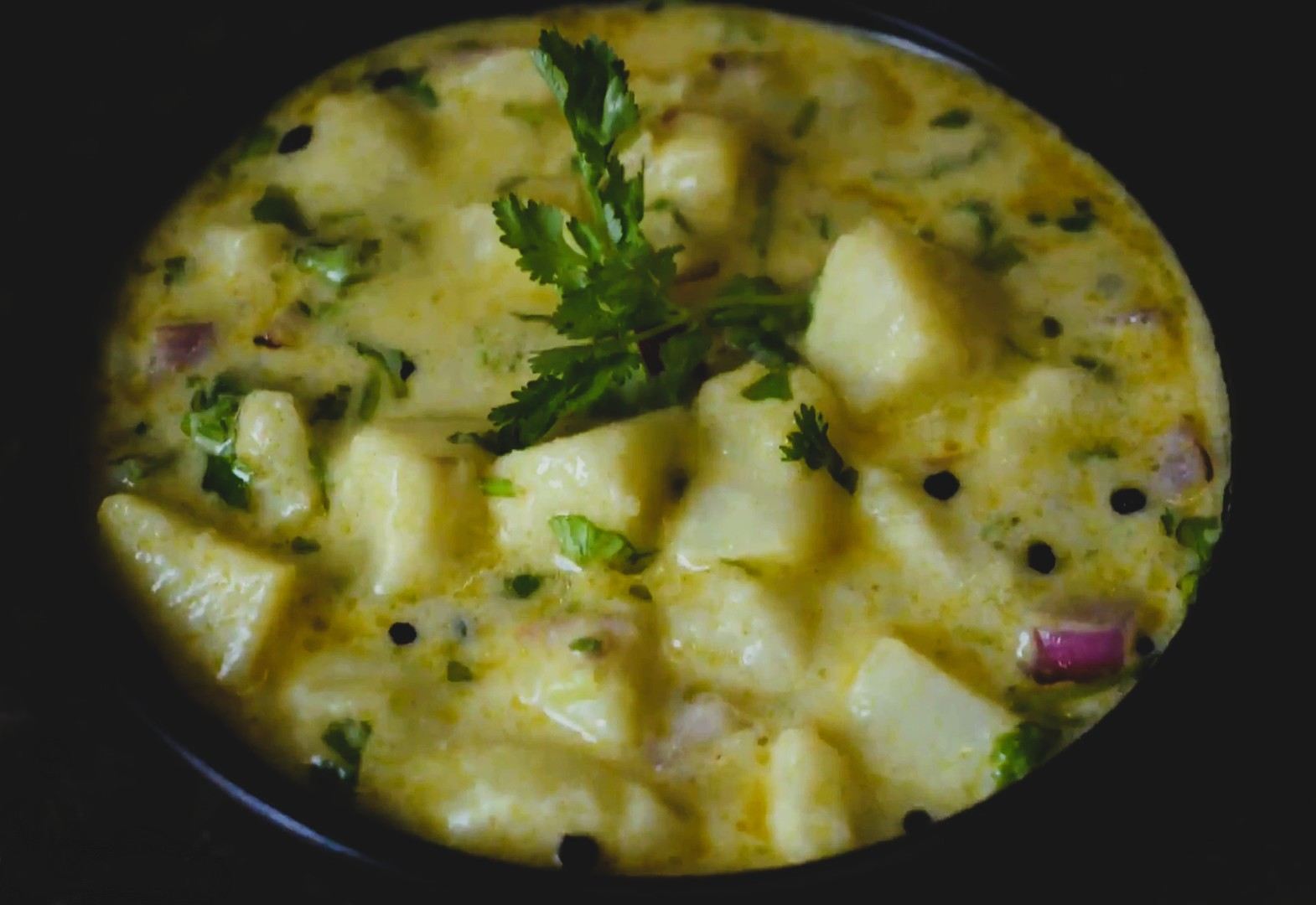
- A bowl of Chukauni
- Type: Salad
- Course: Side dish
- Place of origin: Nepal
- Region or state: Palpa district, Gandaki
- Cooking time: 20 minutes to 30 minutes
- Main ingredients: Potatoes, dahi, salt and spices
- Ingredients generally used: Onion, chilies

Chukauni (Nepali: चुकौनी) is a Nepalese salad that originated around the Palpa District of western Nepal. It is made from boiled potatoes, yogurt, onion, coriander and spices. It is a popular type of salad and eaten mainly as a side dish with roti, sel roti or steamed rice.

It can be eaten both warm or cold. It is a simple dish to make with few ingredients.

== See also ==
- Sel roti
- Raita
- Nepali pickles
