= Khandvi (food) =

Indian snack food

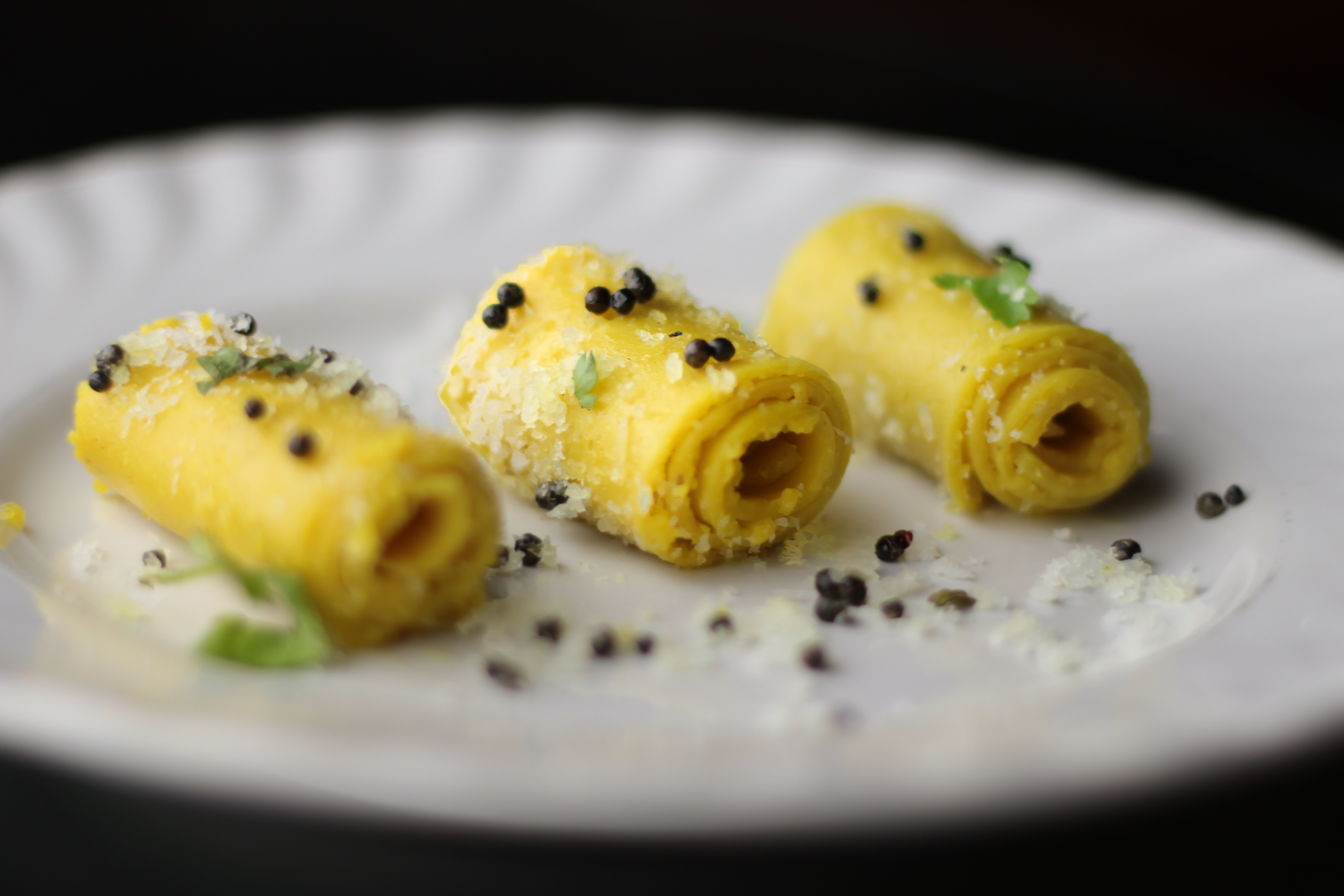
- Place of origin: India
- Region or state: Gujarat
- Main ingredients: Gram flour, dahi

Khandvi (Gujarati: ખાંડવી khāṇḍvī), also known as patuli, dahivadi or suralichi vadi (Marathi: सुरळीची वडी), is a savory snack in Gujarati cuisine of India. It consists of yellowish, tightly rolled bite-sized pieces and is primarily made of gram flour and yogurt.

Khandvi is readily available across India and is commonly eaten as an appetizer or snack. Many people choose to buy it from local shops rather than preparing it at home. It is sometimes served with garlic chutney.

== Preparation ==
Khandvi is usually prepared from a batter of gram flour and yogurt seasoned with ginger paste, salt, water, turmeric, and sometimes green chili peppers. The batter is cooked down to a thick paste and then spread thinly on a flat surface.Khandvis are then rolled up tightly into 2–3 cm (1 inch) pieces. Khandvi is generally bite-size. It can also be seasoned with spices and condiments, such as grated cheese, chutney, or ketchup. It can be served hot or cold.

== See also ==
- Dhokla
- Fafda
