= Tomato compote =

Side dish made from cooked tomatoes

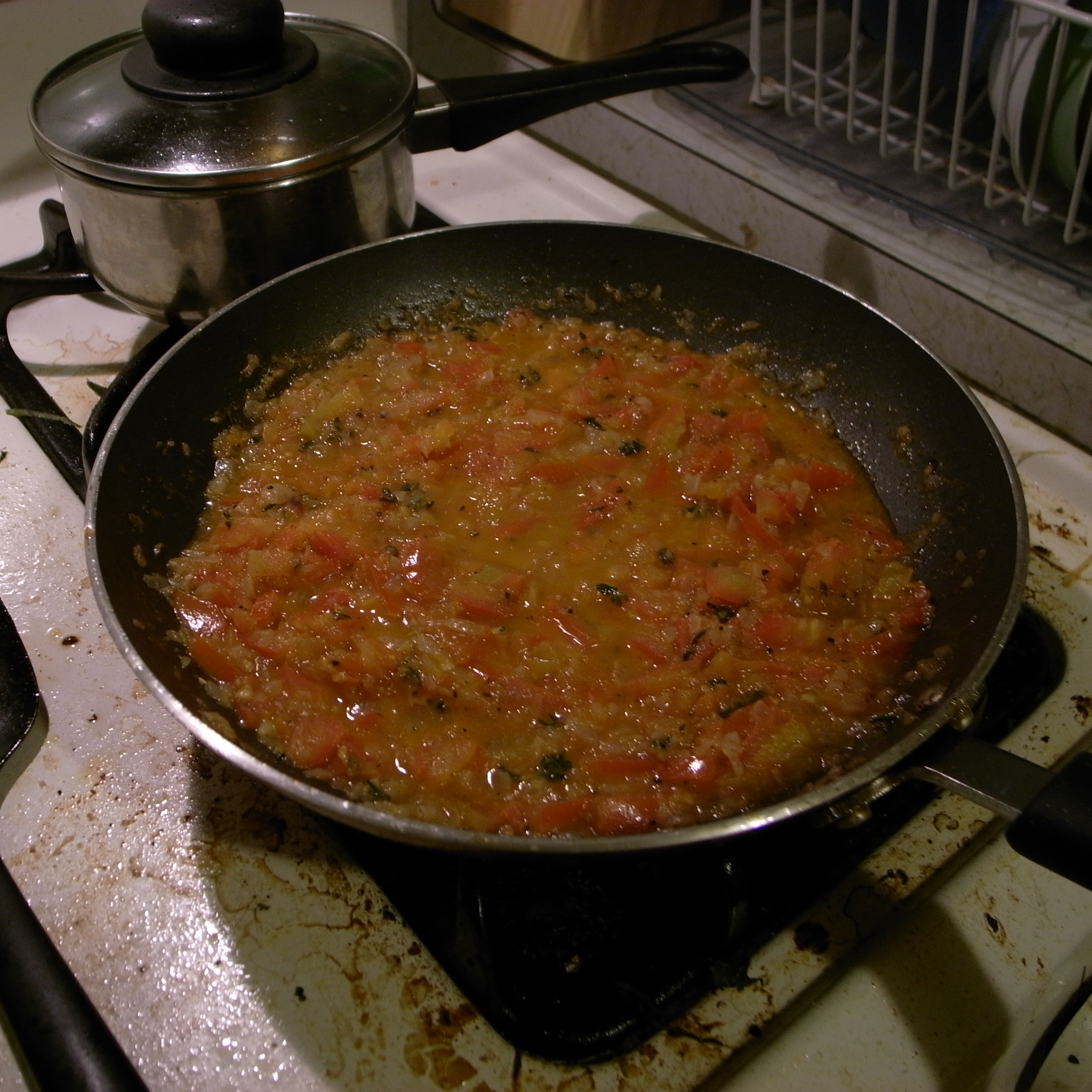
Tomato compote

Tomato compote is a relish or side dish whose main ingredient is roasted or cooked tomatoes. In the United States, it has been prepared at least since 1876, when it appeared in the Little Dinners cookbook by Mary Hooper (1829–1904).

The main ingredient can be roasted, sauteed, or boiled tomatoes.

== See also ==
- Compote
- List of tomato dishes
- Tomato chutney
