= Compote =

Dessert of fruit cooked in syrup

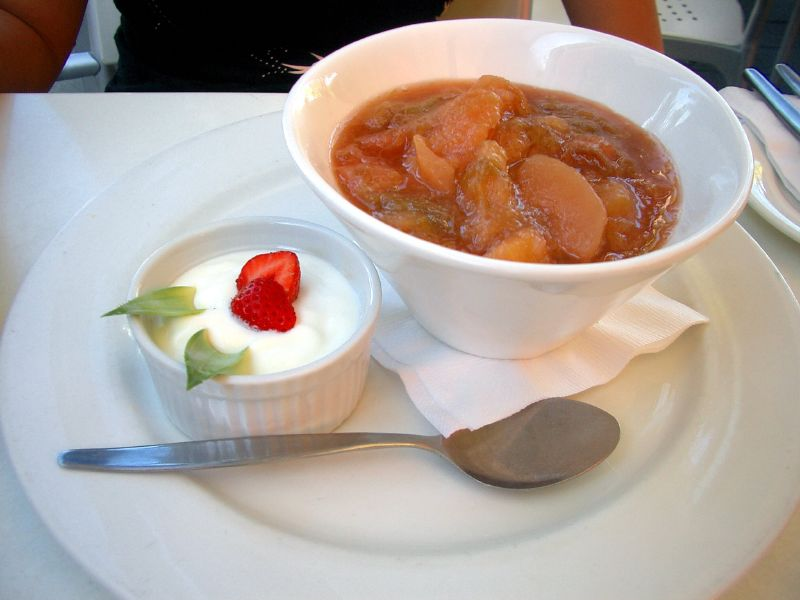
- A rhubarb and apple compote (right)
- Alternative names: compost (Middle English)
- Type: Dessert
- Serving temperature: Warm or chilled
- Main ingredients: Fruit, sugar syrup, spices

Compote or compôte (/ˈkɑːmpoʊt/ KAHM-poht; French for 'stewed fruit') is a dessert originating in medieval Europe, made of whole or pieces of fruit in sugar syrup. Whole fruits are cooked in water with sugar and spices. The syrup may be seasoned with vanilla, lemon or orange peel, cinnamon sticks or powder, cloves, other spices, ground almonds, grated coconut, candied fruit or raisins. Compote can be served either warm or cold.

== History ==
Compote conformed to the medieval presumption that fruit cooked in sugar syrup balanced the effects of humidity on the body. The name is derived from the Latin word compositus, meaning mixture. In late medieval England it was served at the beginning of the last course of a feast (or sometimes the second out of three courses), often accompanied by a creamy potage. During the Renaissance, it was served chilled at the end of dinner. Because it was easy to prepare, made from inexpensive ingredients and contained no dairy products, compote became a staple of Jewish households throughout Europe. In modern French, the term refers to usually unsweetened fruit purée without fruit chunks, such as applesauce.

== Variations ==
Dried fruit is often used for compote by cultures from eastern Europe, and its syrup is also drunk as a beverage. Both are called kompot. In Mennonite culture, dried-fruit compote is known by the Plautdietch name pluma moos.

The dessert may be topped with whipped cream, cinnamon, or vanilla sugar. The syrup may be made with wine, as in one early 15th-century recipe for pear compote. Other variations include using dried fruit that have been soaked in water in which alcohol can be added; for example, kirsch, rum, or Frontignan.

== See also ==
- Varenye
- Fruit fool
- Kompot
- Kissel
- Minatamis na saging
- Tomato compote
- Tong sui
- List of French desserts
