= Cucumber raita =

Indian condiment

Cucumber Raita
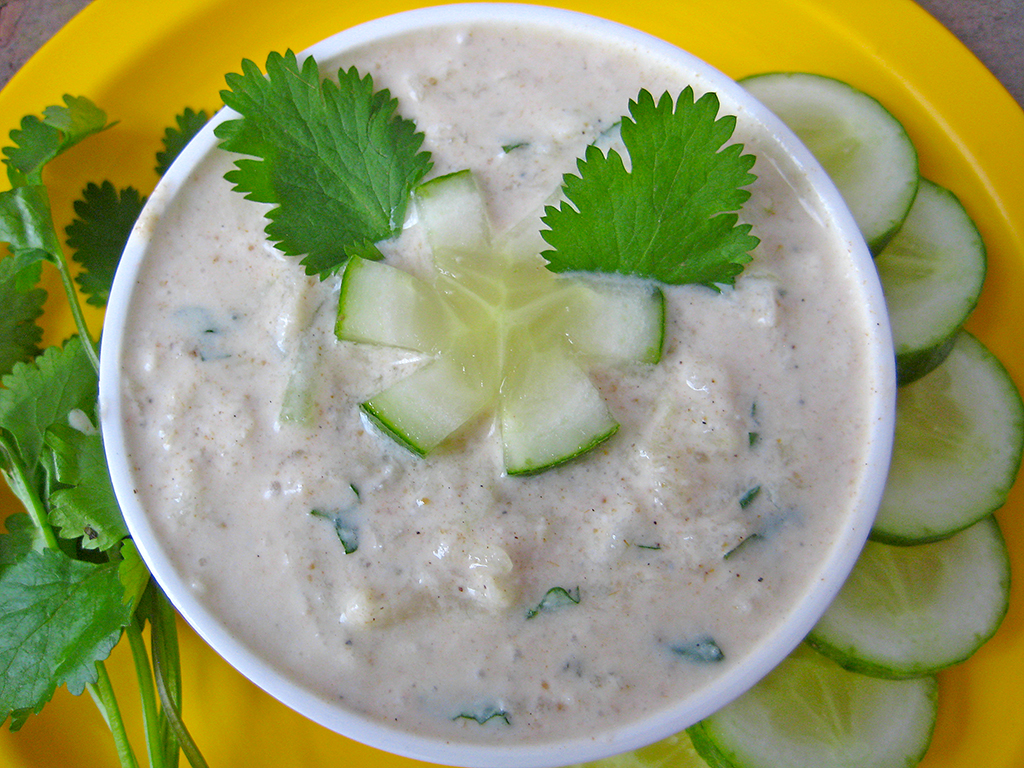
- Cucumber raita served with the garnishing of fresh coriander leaves.
- Place of origin: India
- Region or state: Indian subcontinent
- Main ingredients: Cucumber, dahi (yogurt), Green Chilli

Cucumber Raita is a variation of raita that can be used as a dip or a salad. It is made by mixing together freshly chopped cucumber, green chillies, and dahi (yogurt), and optionally finely chopped tomato and onion.

It is especially popular in the summer months as it helps to beat the heat. It is often served as a side accompaniment with the main course in Indian cuisine.

== See also ==
- Raita
- List of yogurt-based dishes and beverages
