= Coconut chutney =

South Indian chutney

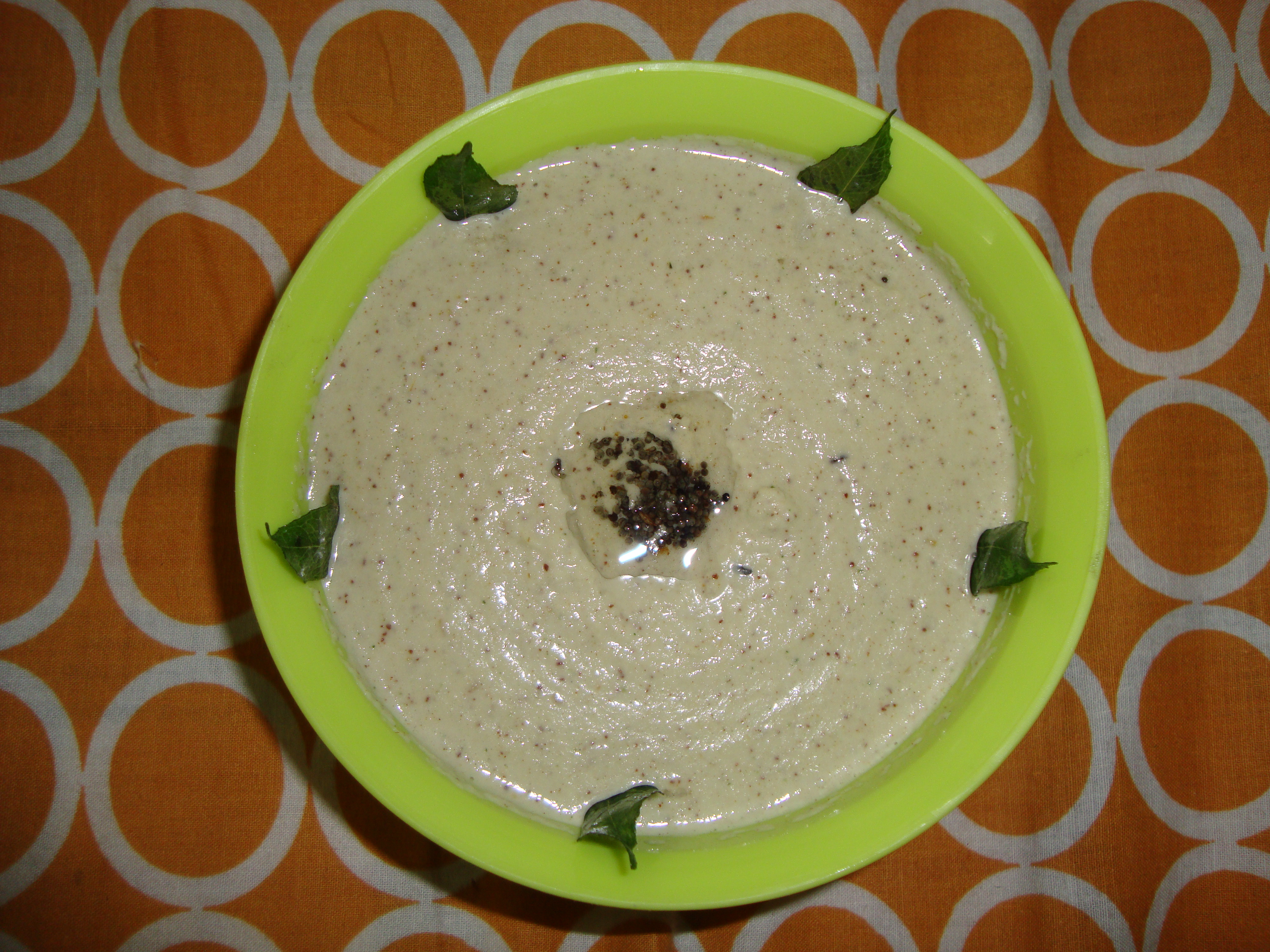
- Alternative names: kayi chattni
- Course: Condiment
- Place of origin: India
- Region or state: Originally limited to coastal plains of Vijayanagara Kingdom (Coastal Karnataka, Coastal Andhra, Kerala, Pondicherry and Coastal Tamil Nadu) where coconut plantations was a tradition. Later spread out to high plateau of Karnataka, Tamil Nadu, Rayalaseema of erstwhile Andhra Pradesh, and later to Telangana
- Main ingredients: Coconut, ginger, chillies, curry leaves, mustard seeds

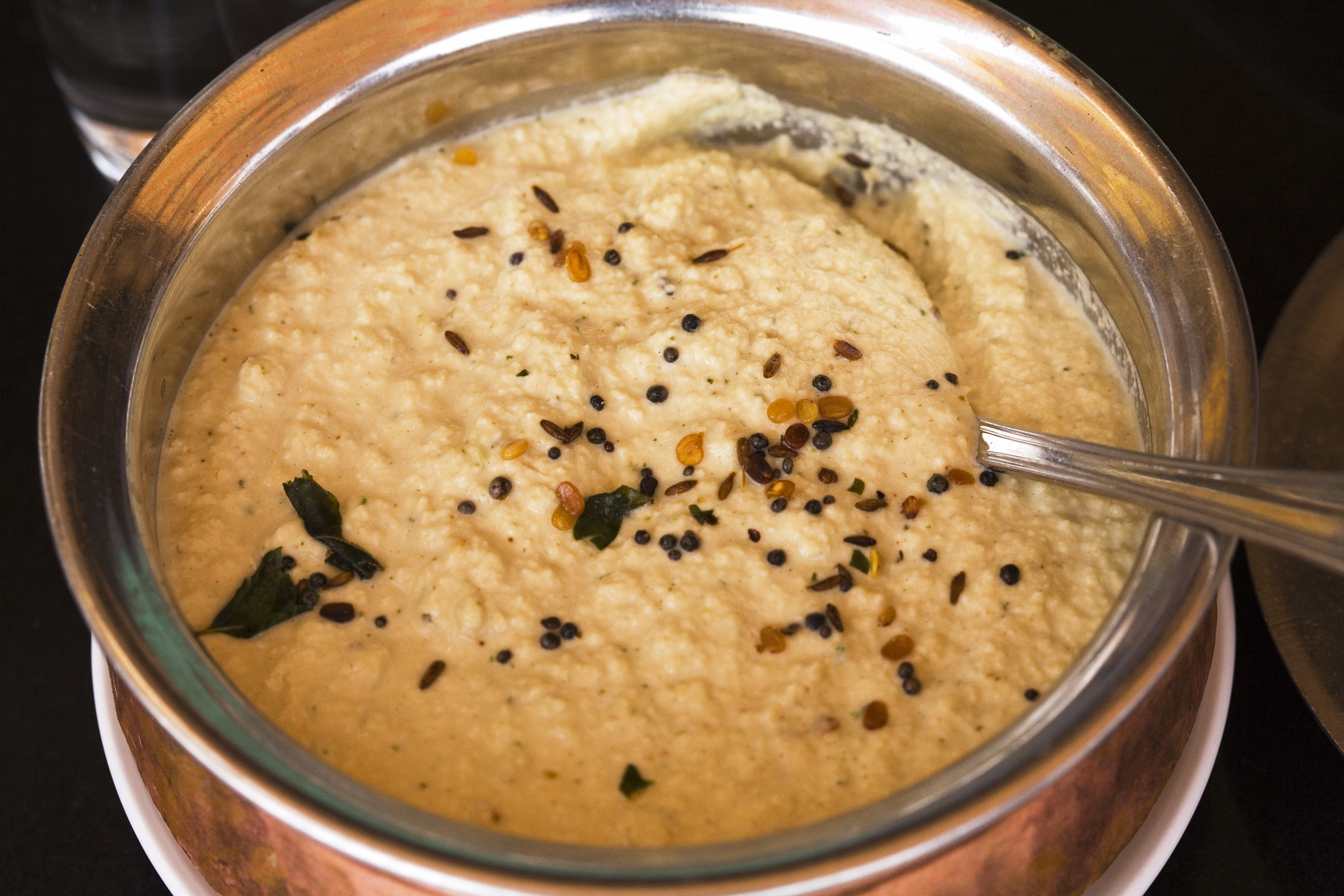
Prepared coconut chutney in a bowl

Coconut chutney is a south Indian chutney, a side-dish or a condiment, common in the Indian subcontinent. The condiment is made with coconut pulp ground with other ingredients such as green chillies, tamarind, salt, coriander and water. Coconut chutney is made with both red chillies and green chillies. It is served with dosas, idli, bajji, bonda, and vada. In Karnataka, coconut chutney is also served with rice dishes such as pulao, puliyogare, tomato baath, and vangi baath.

== See also ==
- Kalathappam
- Kinnathappam
- Chammanthi podi
- List of chutneys
