= Tomato chutney =

Chutney with tomatoes as the main ingredient

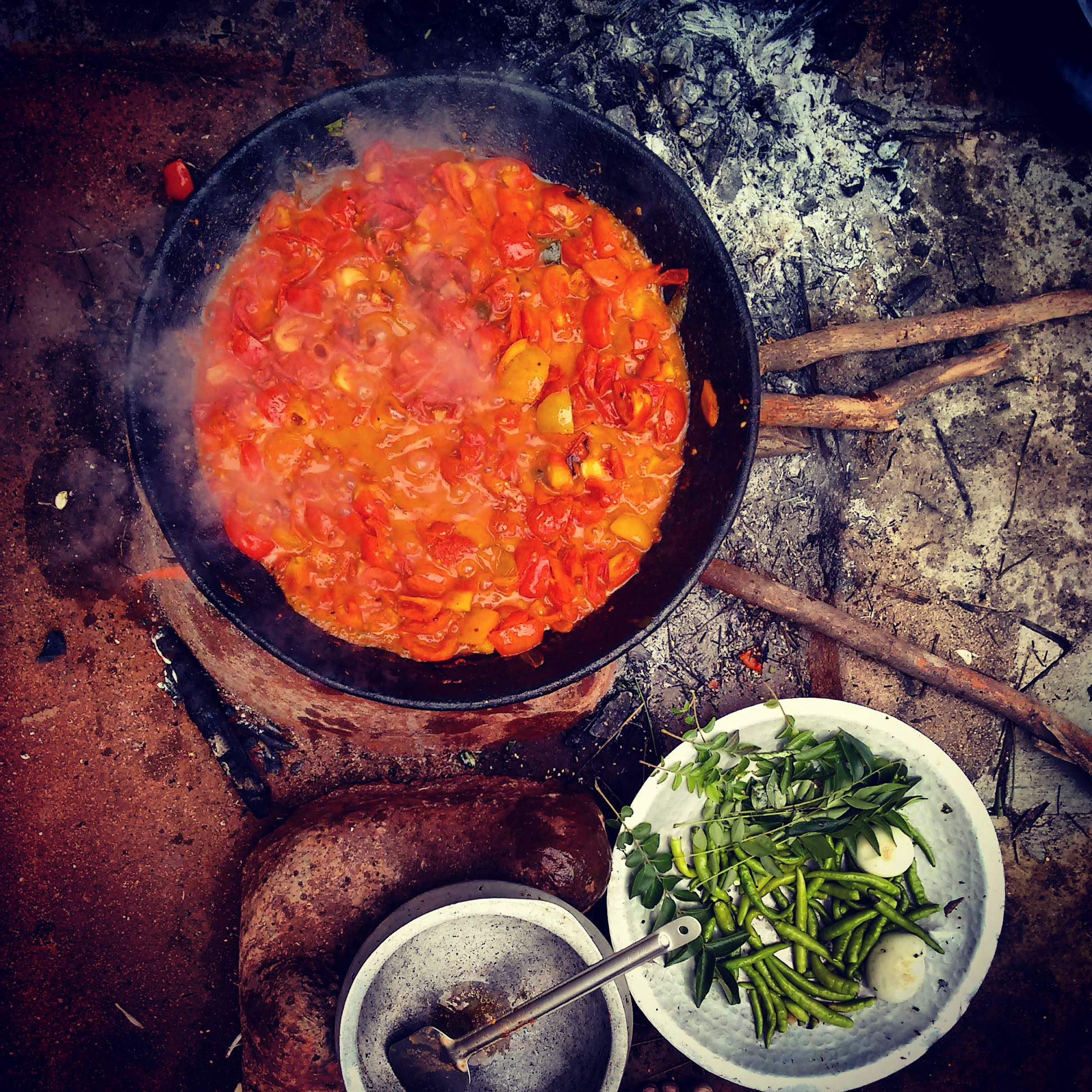
- A tomato chutney made of tomatoes, chili peppers, onions and Indian spices being cooked.
- Place of origin: Indian subcontinent
- Region or state: Indian subcontinent
- Associated cuisine: India, Bangladesh, Pakistan
- Main ingredients: Indian spices, tomato

Tomato chutney is a type of chutney, originating from the Indian subcontinent, prepared using tomatoes as the primary ingredient. The tomatoes can be diced, mashed or pulped, and additional typical ingredients used include ginger, chilli, sugar, salt, aam papad, raisin, dates and spices and additionally onion, garlic and peanut or dal for the south Indian version. It can be prepared using ripe red tomatoes or green tomatoes. It can be eaten fresh after preparation, stored in a refrigerator, and can be bottled or canned and stored for later use. Homemade tomato chutney that is canned can have an improved flavor, due to the ingredients intermingling while the product is stored.

== Uses ==
Tomato chutney can be used to accompany myriad foods and dishes, such as kebabs, sandwiches, burgers and meat dishes.

== Commercial varieties ==
Tomato chutney has been a mass-produced product in the United States. Gordon & Dilworth in New York produced it in the 1890s–1900s (decade), and exported some of the product.

== Gallery ==
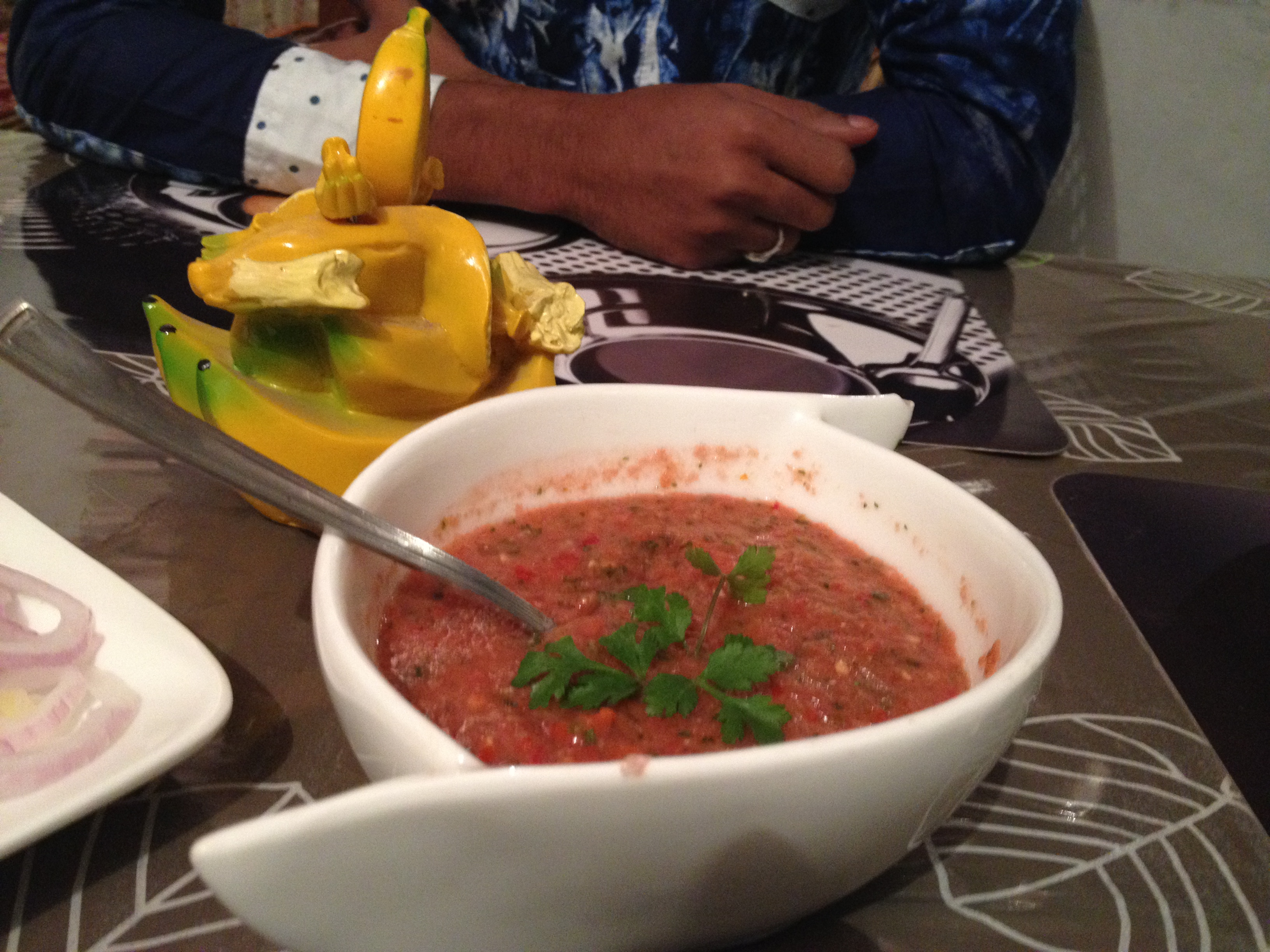
Tomato chutney prepared using coriander and garlic

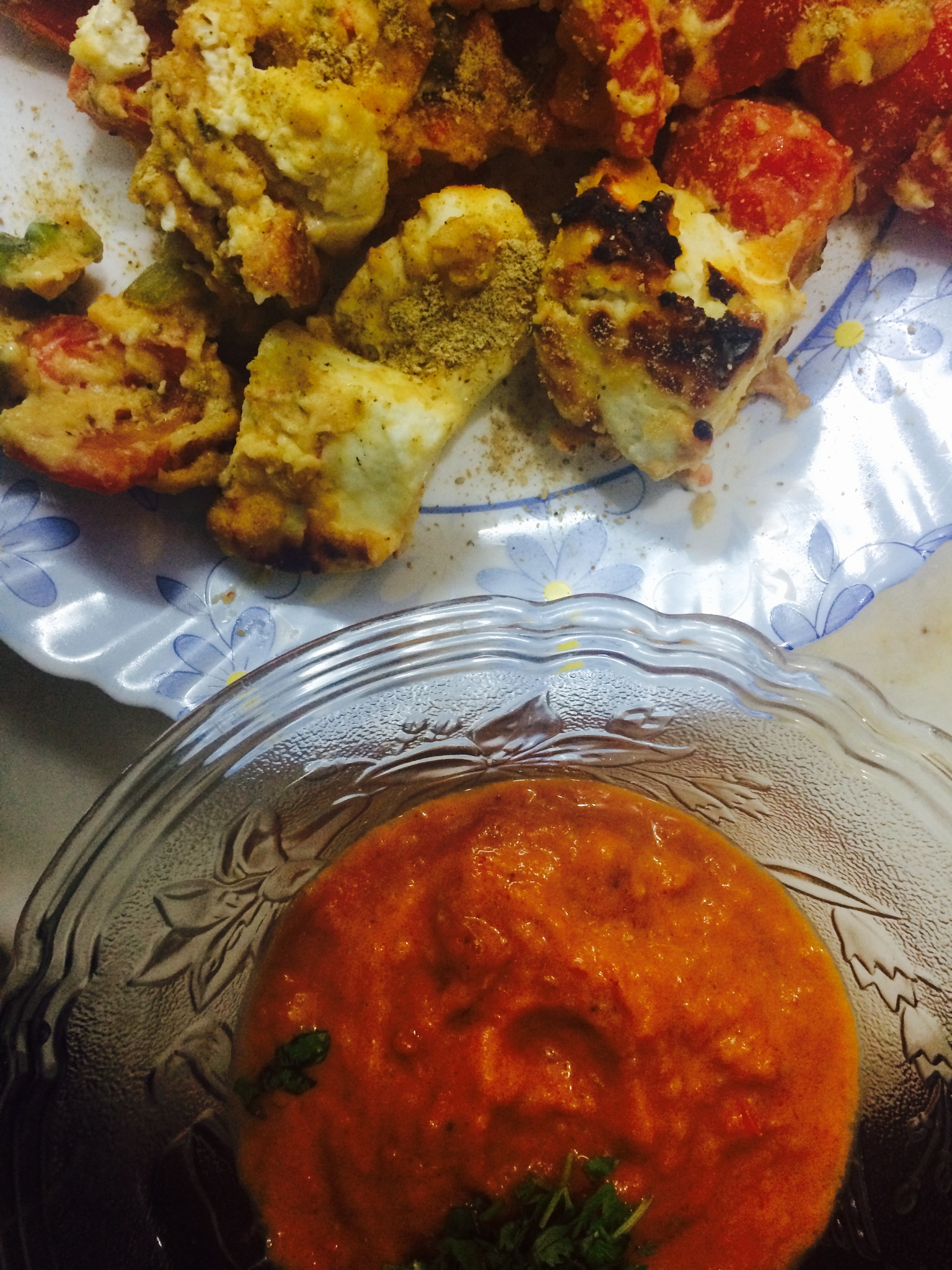
Paneer tikka with tomato chutney

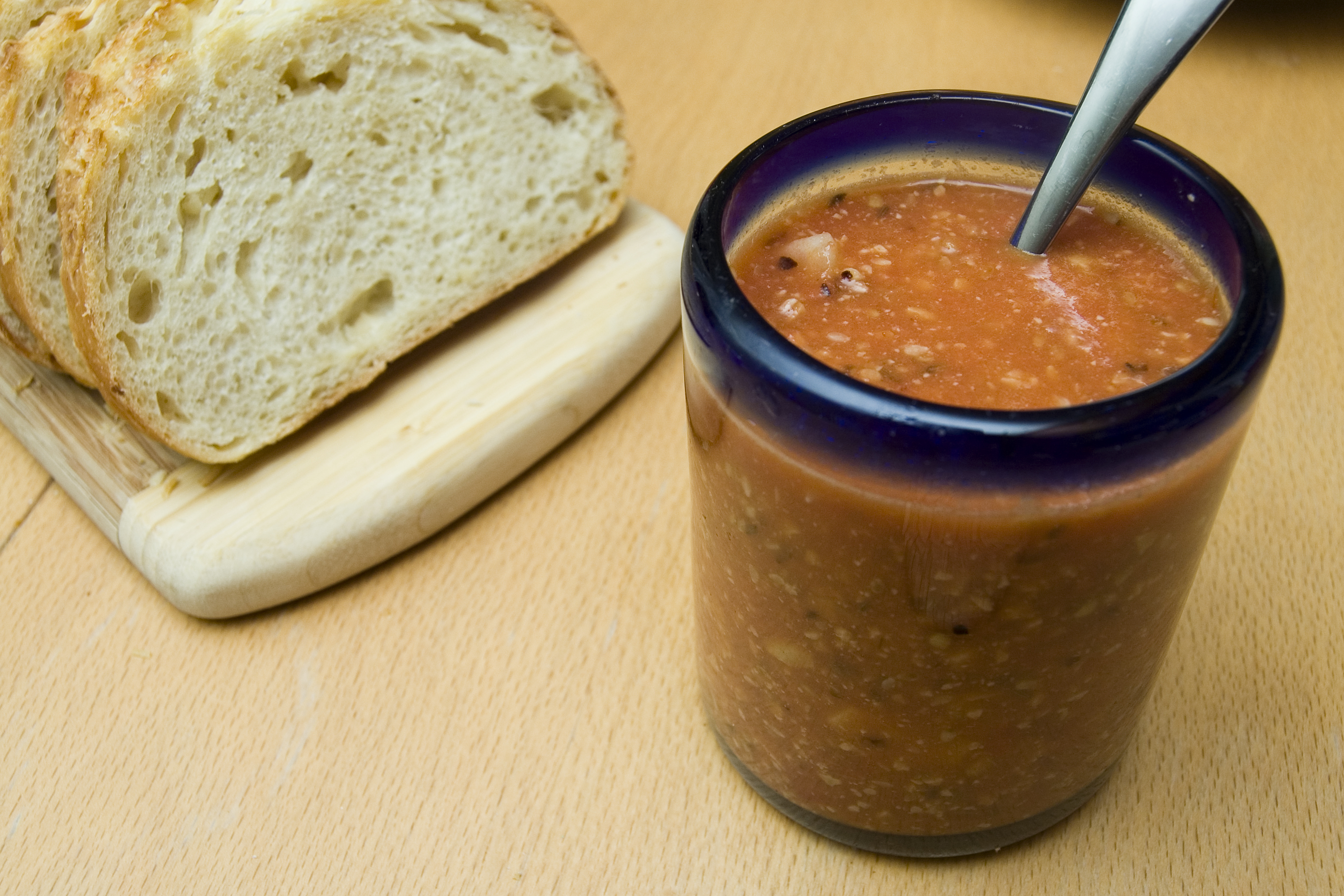
A homemade tomato chutney

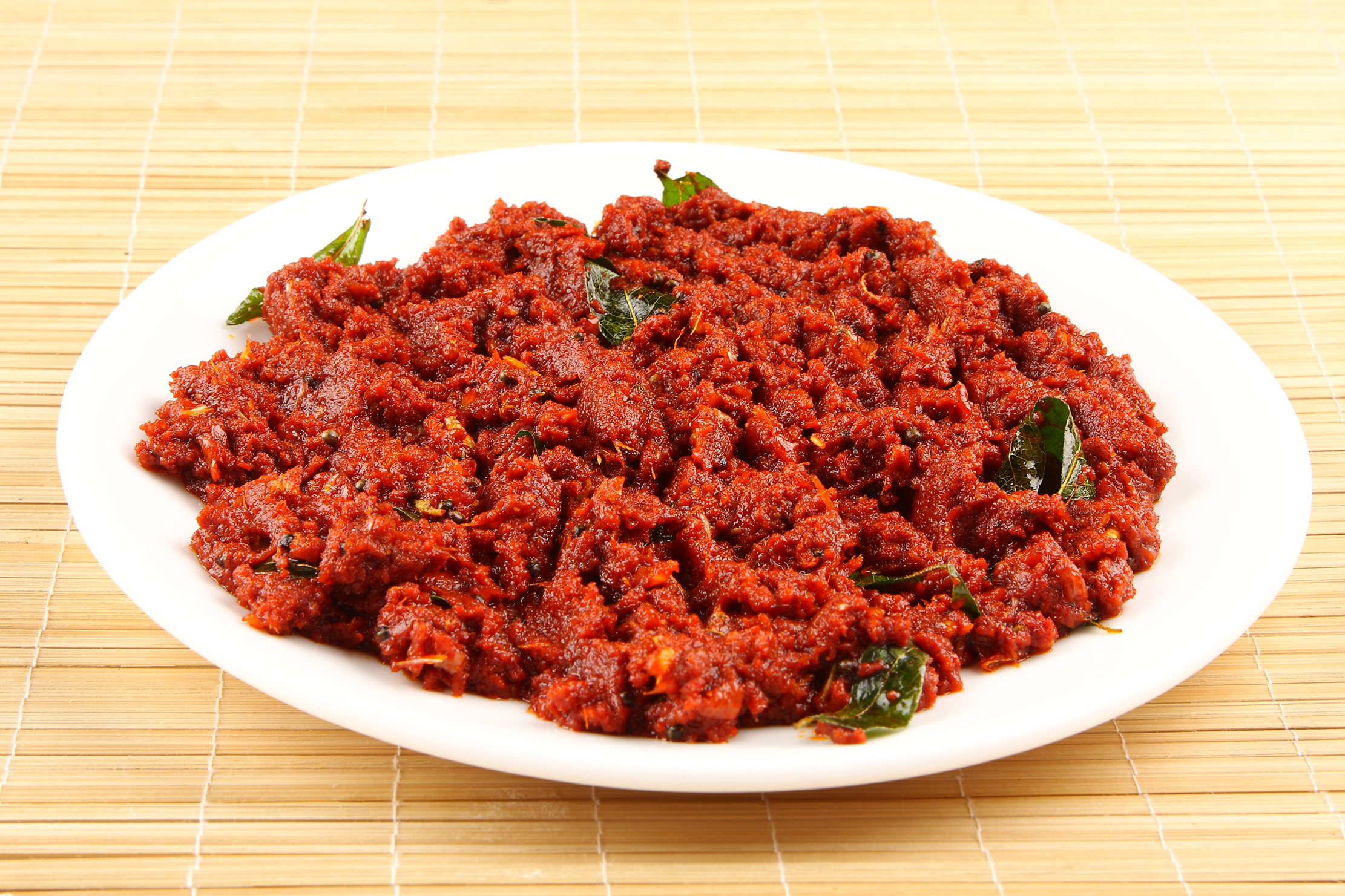
Another homemade tomato chutney

== See also ==
- List of chutneys
- List of tomato dishes
- Pickled fruit
- Tomato compote
- Tomato jam
