= Raita =

South Asian food

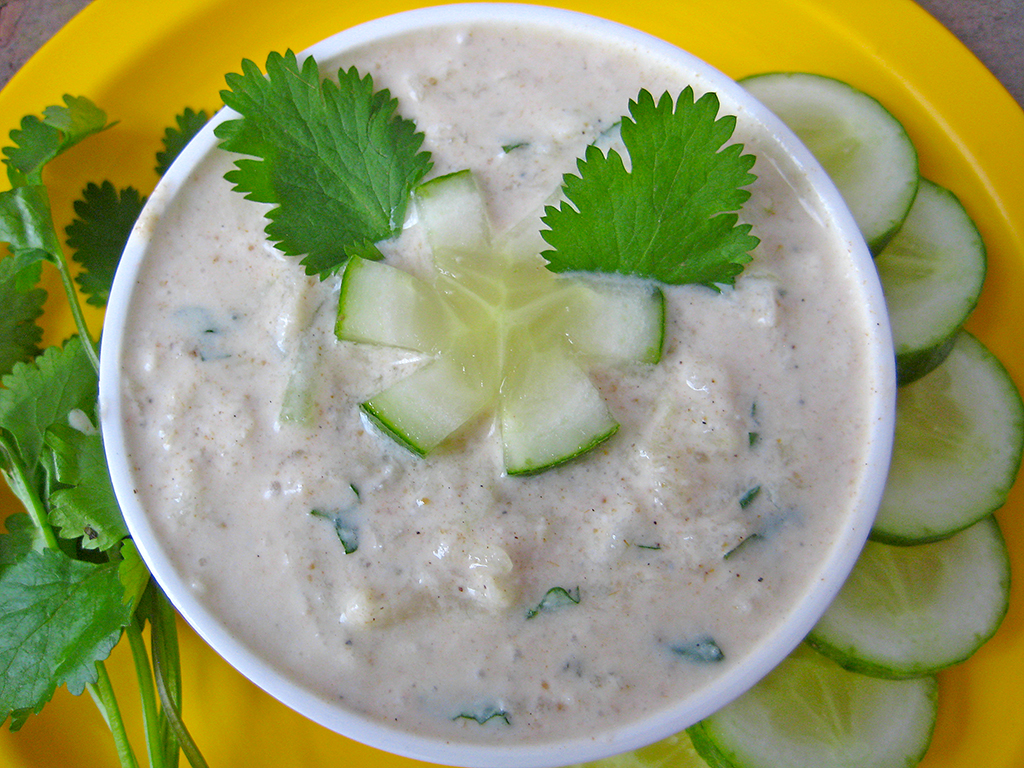
- Cucumber raita
- Course: Condiment
- Region or state: Indian subcontinent with regional variations
- Associated cuisine: Indian, Bangladeshi, Pakistani, Nepali
- Serving temperature: Cold
- Main ingredients: Dahi (yogurt), buttermilk, cucumber, mint
- Variations: Dahi chutney, Pachadi, Green mango chutney
- Food energy (per serving): 46 kcal (190 kJ)

Raita (IPA: [ɾaːjt̪aː]) is a side dish and condiment in Indian cuisine made of dahi (yogurt or "curd") together with raw or cooked vegetables, fruit, or pulses. The yogurt may be seasoned with herbs and spices such as coriander, roasted cumin seeds, mint, and cayenne pepper.

Raita is served alongside many Indian dishes such as pulao rice, and as a mild cooling accompaniment to spicy curries.

== Etymology ==
The word raita first appeared in print around the 19th century, from Hindi. The word raita in Bengali and Hindi is a portmanteau of the Sanskrit word rajika or the derivative Hindi rai (pronounced "ra-ee") meaning black mustard seed, and tiktaka, meaning sharp or pungent.

== Dish ==
Spices such as cumin (jīrā) and black mustard (rāī) are fried. This tempering is mixed with minced, raw vegetables or fruits (such as cucumber, onion, carrot, beetroot, tomato, pineapple, or pomegranate) and yogurt.

Raita is served as a side dish to be eaten with main course dishes, from pulao to curries. It is usually served chilled. It helps to cool the palate when eating spicy Indian dishes.

== Variants ==
Raitas can be varied by using any of three types of ingredient as its base: vegetables, pulses, or fruits. These are mixed with yogurt and flavoured with a variety of seasonings to make different types of raita. A commonly made version is cucumber raita. Seasonal ingredients include goosefoot or lamb's quarters (Chenopodium album), used in wintertime in Haryana to make bathua ka raita. Among the many regional variants is chukauni, potato raita, made in Nepal. It is flavoured with onion and coriander, and eaten with dishes such as batuk, fritters of black lentils. In Eastern Nepal, the basic dish is known as dahi kakro (lit. 'yogurt cucumber'), whereas in western regions of Nepal it is known as raito.

Similar yoghurt with vegetable dishes in South India include kichadi and pachadi. For example, a South Indian tomato and yoghurt dish with coconut oil, curry leaves, and mustard seeds is called thakkali pachadi.

Raita variants

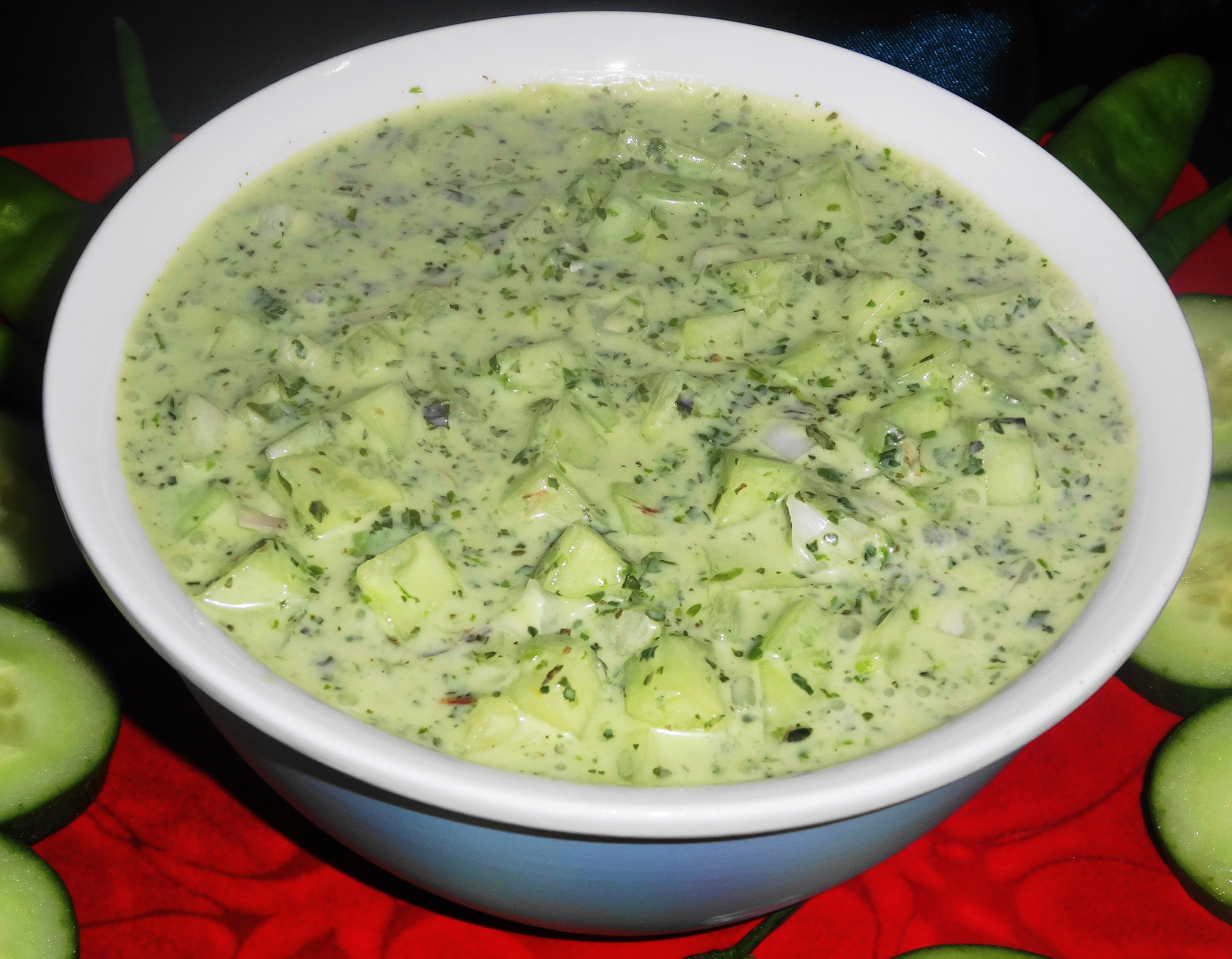
Cucumber raita

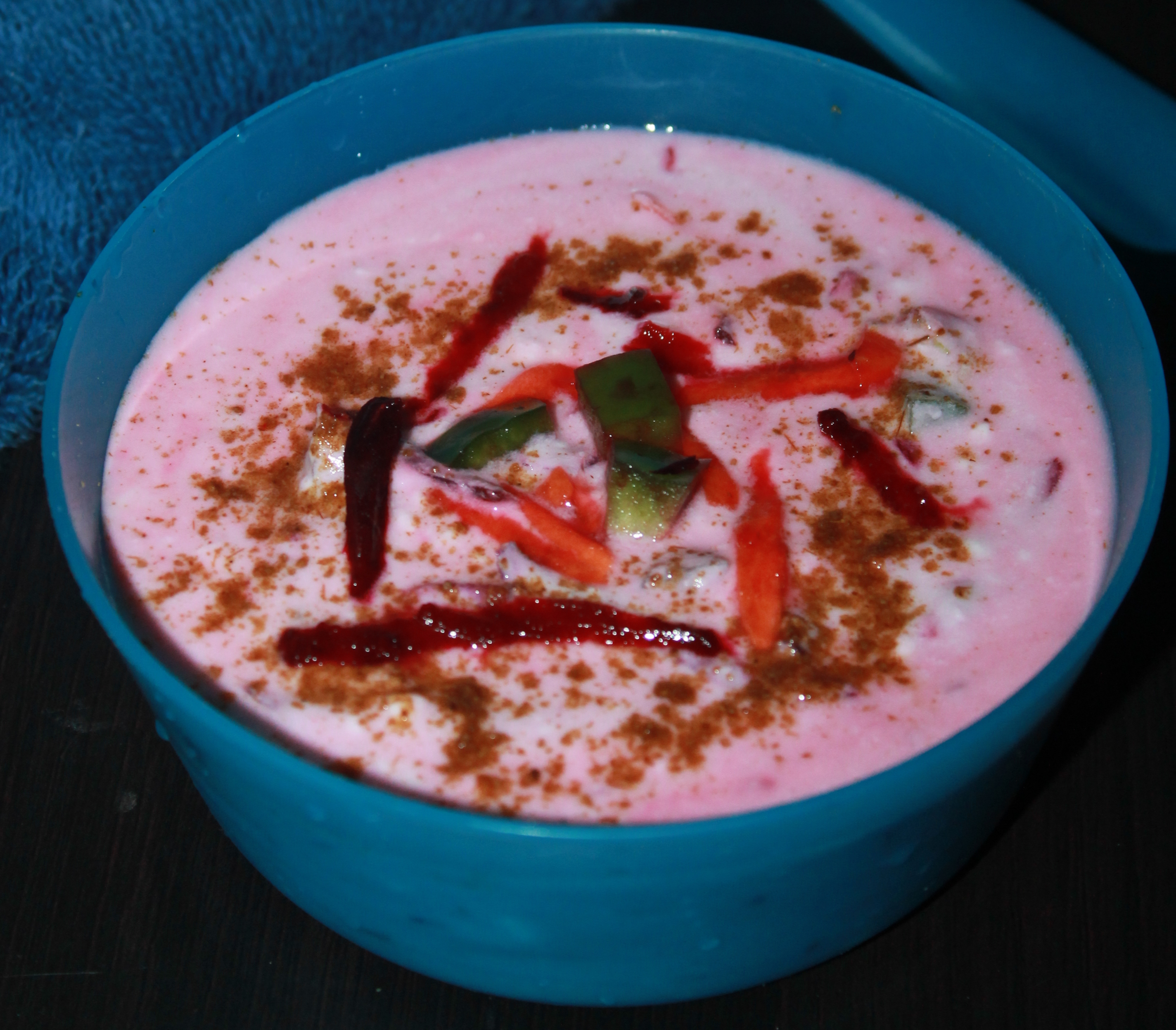
Beetroot and carrot raita

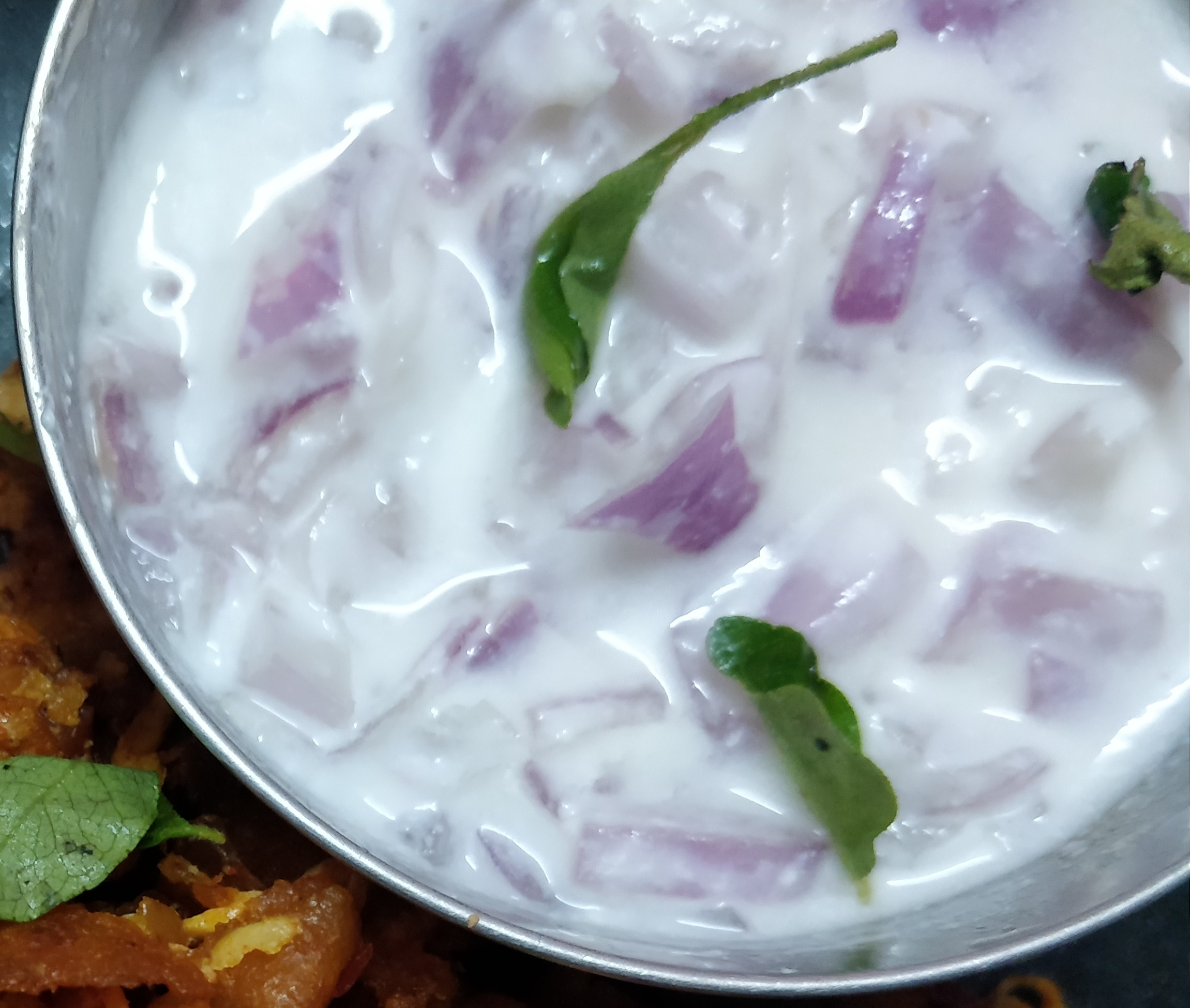
Onion raita

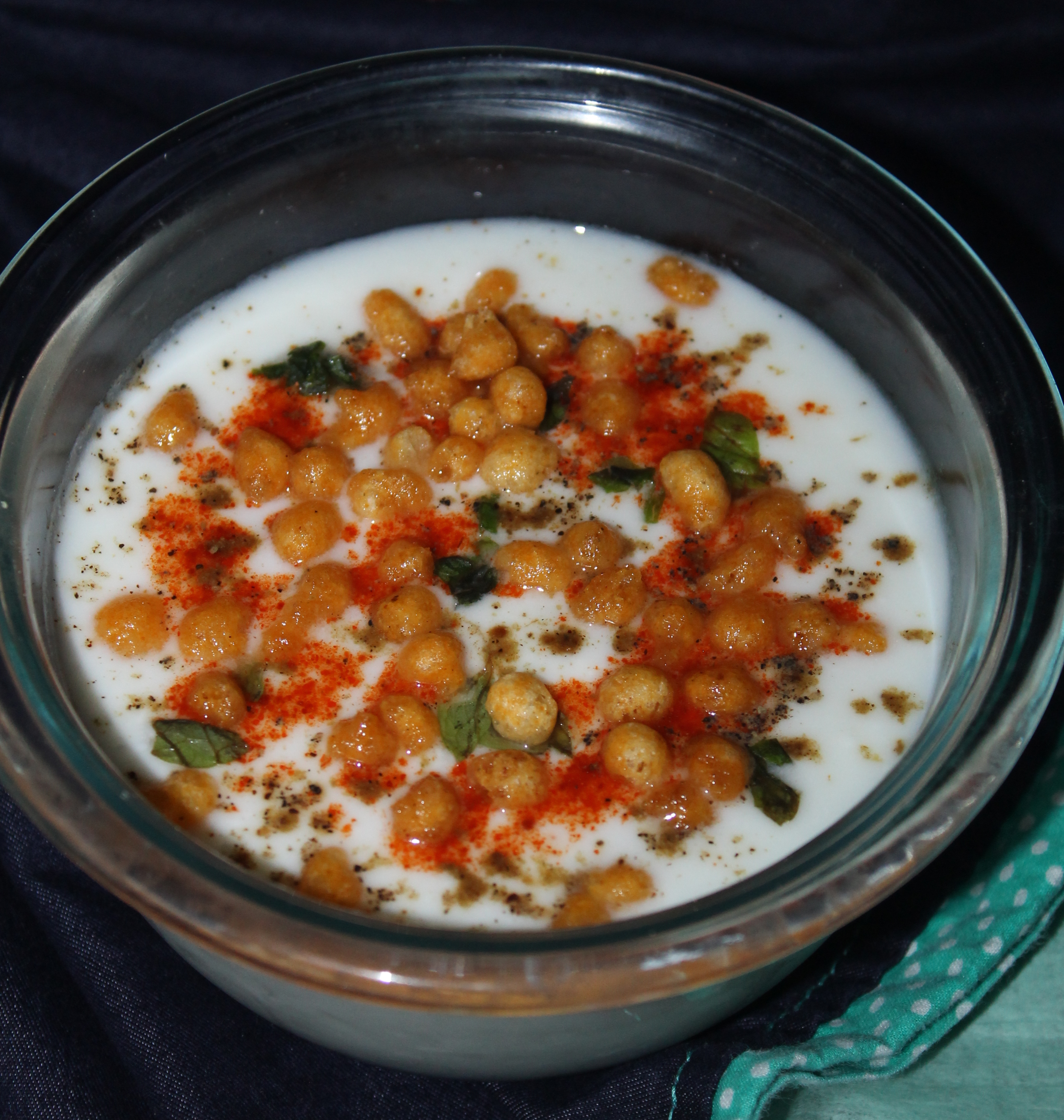
Chickpea raita

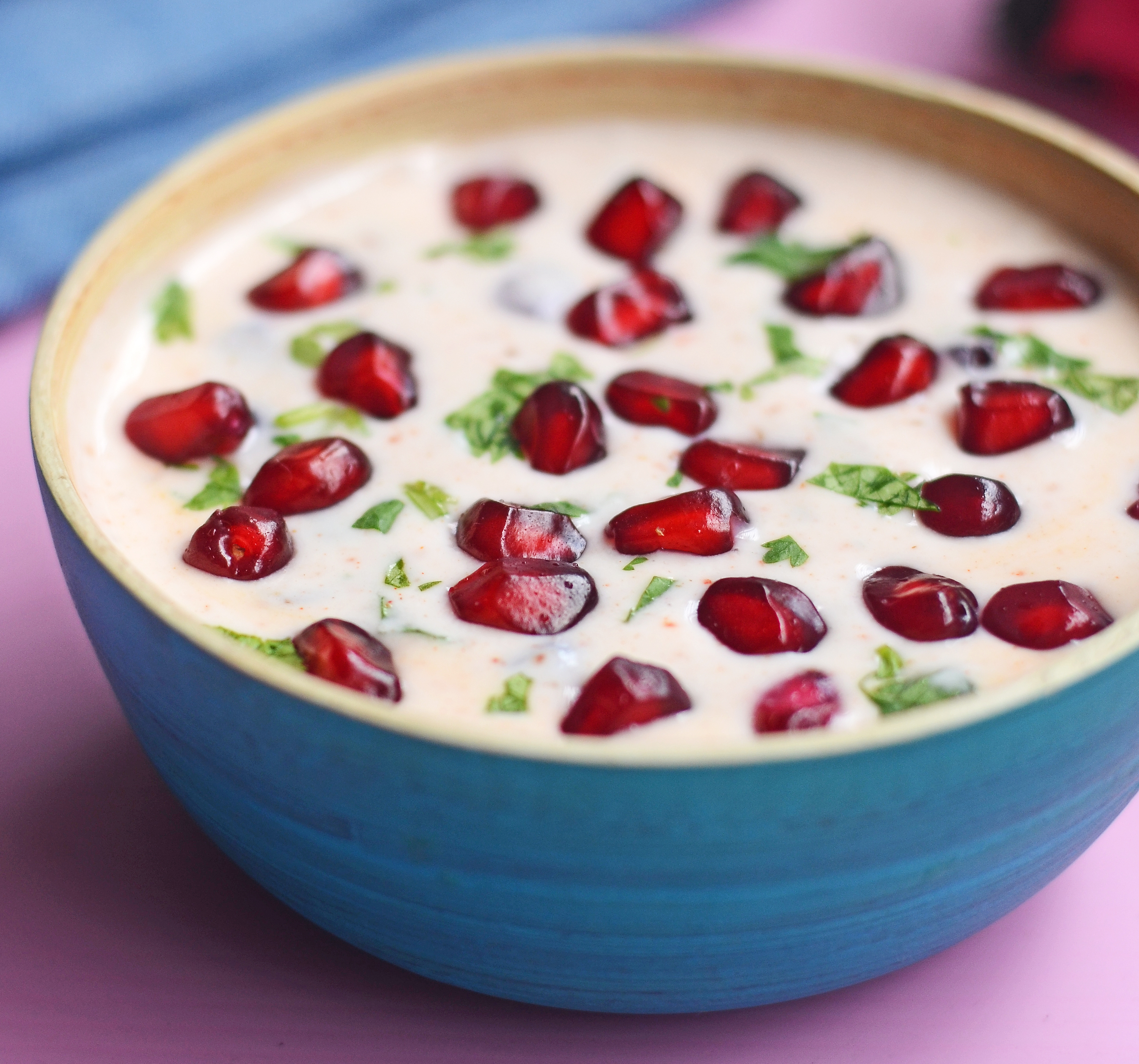
Pomegranate raita

== See also ==
- Chutney
- List of dips
- List of condiments
- List of yogurt-based dishes and beverages
- Tzatziki, a similar dish found in Eastern Mediterranean and Middle Eastern cuisine
