= Chutney =

South Asian condiment

- Chutneys, Bengaluru, India
- Alternative names: blatjang, chatni, pachadi, satni, thambuli
- Region or state: South Asia, Britain, Western world
- Associated cuisine: Bangladesh, Fiji, India, Guyana, Mauritius, Nepal, Pakistan, South Africa, Sri Lanka, Suriname, Trinidad and Tobago, United Kingdom
- Main ingredients: Vegetables, fruits, salt, spices

A chutney (pronounced [ˈʧəʈɳiː]) is a condiment associated with cuisines of the Indian subcontinent. Chutneys are made in a wide variety of forms, some raw such as with coriander, others cooked with sugar, like mango chutney. During the British Raj, Anglo-Indian cuisine adapted Indian chutney and brought it back to Britain, where green mango chutney in particular became popular. In the Western world, chutneys may be made with local fruits and vegetables, or purchased.

== Etymology and nomenclature ==
The word chutney derives from Hindi चटनी caṭnī, Urdu چٹنی chaṭnī, from चाटना chāṭnā 'to lick, taste'. In South India, chutneys are known as pachadi (Telugu: పచ్చడి, Kannada: ಪಚಡಿ, Tamil: பச்சடி, Malayalam: പച്ചടി, Marathi: पचडी) meaning traditional South Indian sauces or chutneys served as side dishes. Roughly translated, a pachadi is a pounded or crushed plant.

== Description ==
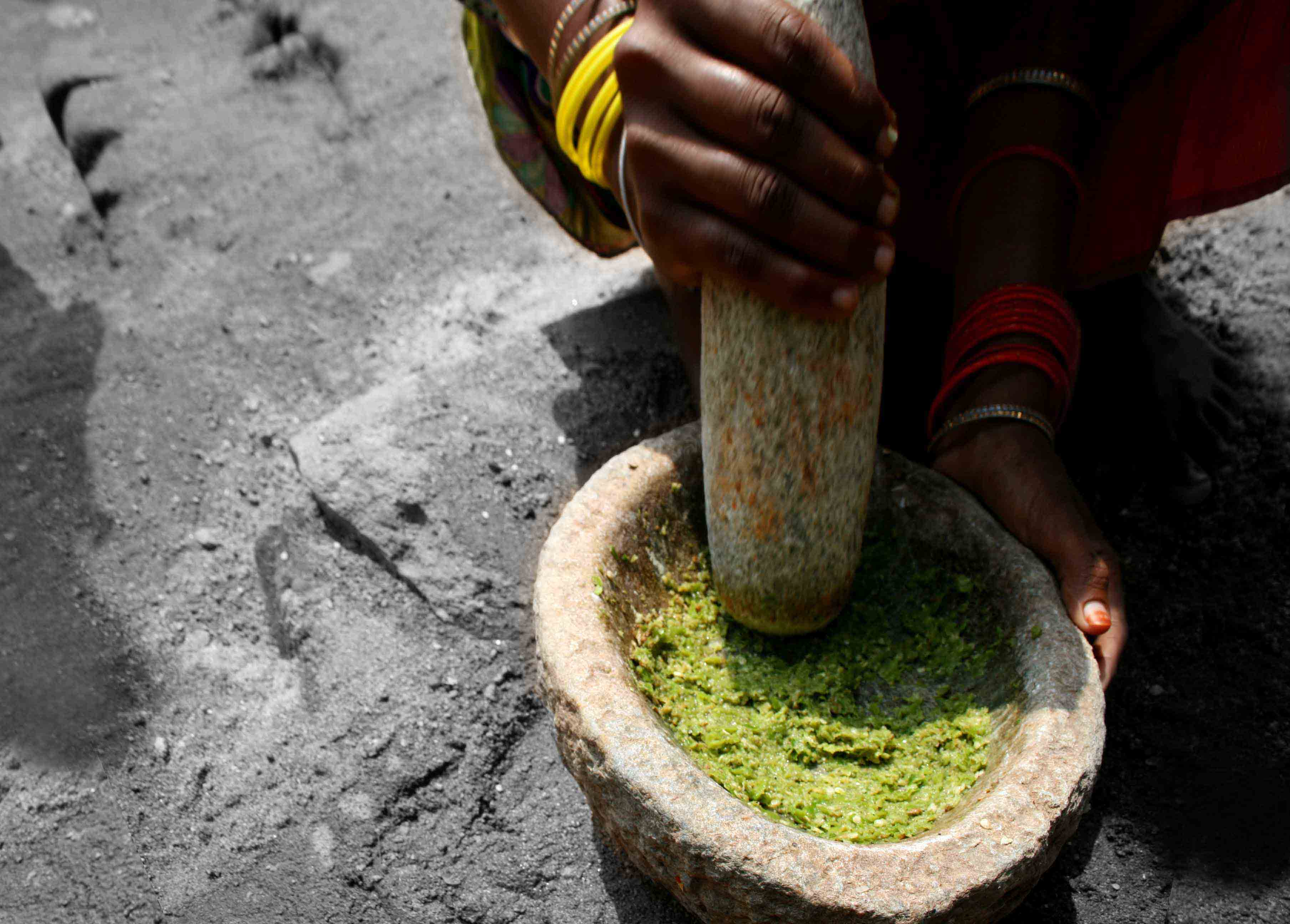
Pounding a chutney with mortar and pestle in India

In Indian cuisine, a wide variety of chutneys are used as spicy relishes, eaten in small quantities, to accompany plain staples such as rice. Indian meals typically comprise a dish of meat, a dish of pulses, rice or bread, a yoghurt relish (raita or dahi), and a homemade chutney.

Chutneys can be broadly divided into two groups: simple fresh preparations that must be eaten immediately; and preserves, which are bottled and kept until required. Fresh coriander chutney consists simply of the fresh green leaves ground up with flavourings, such as fresh green chili, lemon juice, salt, cumin, and black pepper. Preserved chutneys contain fruits cooked with sugar and vinegar, and flavoured with spices such as garlic, cayenne pepper, and ginger.

The flavourings for fresh chutneys are freshly ground each day, and include spices such as chili and ginger as well as herbs like coriander and mint. The body of the chutney may consist of fruits or vegetables, with regional variations. Coconut chutney is the most used in South India; herb and coconut is liked in Western India, as is garlic chutney; while unripe mango chutney is preferred in North India. Chutneys made only with herbs are used in both Western and North India. Tomato chutney is consumed in all parts of India. In Kashmir, chutneys variously use sour cherries, pumpkins, radishes, or walnuts.

In Bangladesh, chutneys may be sweet or spicy-hot, and use a wide variety of fruits and vegetables. An acid foodstuff like lemon juice, tamarind, or vinegar is often added to preserve the chutney. These are flavoured with spices including asafoetida, coriander, cumin, and fenugreek, and herbs such as green coriander and mint.

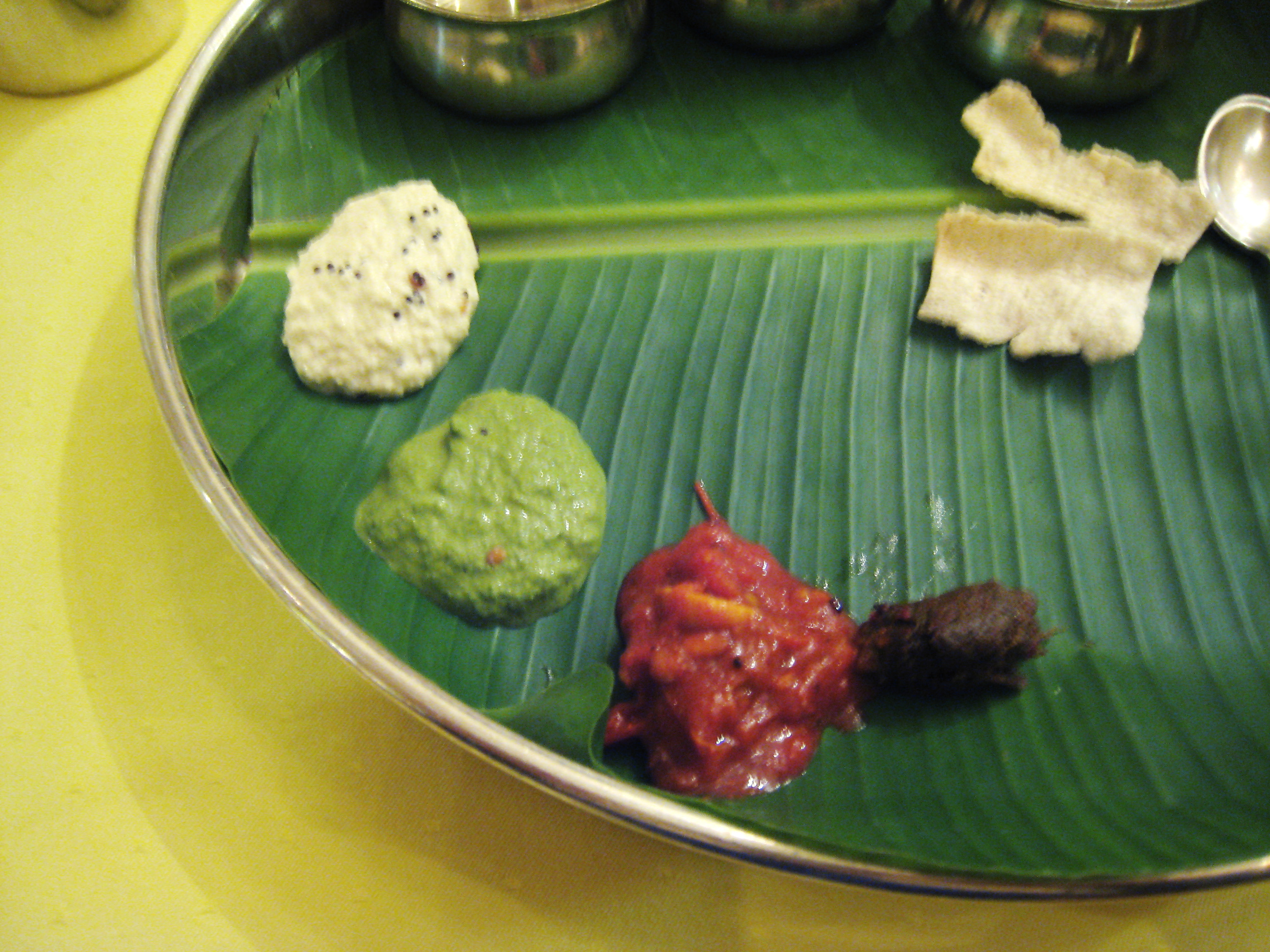
South Indian-style chutneys, Bangalore

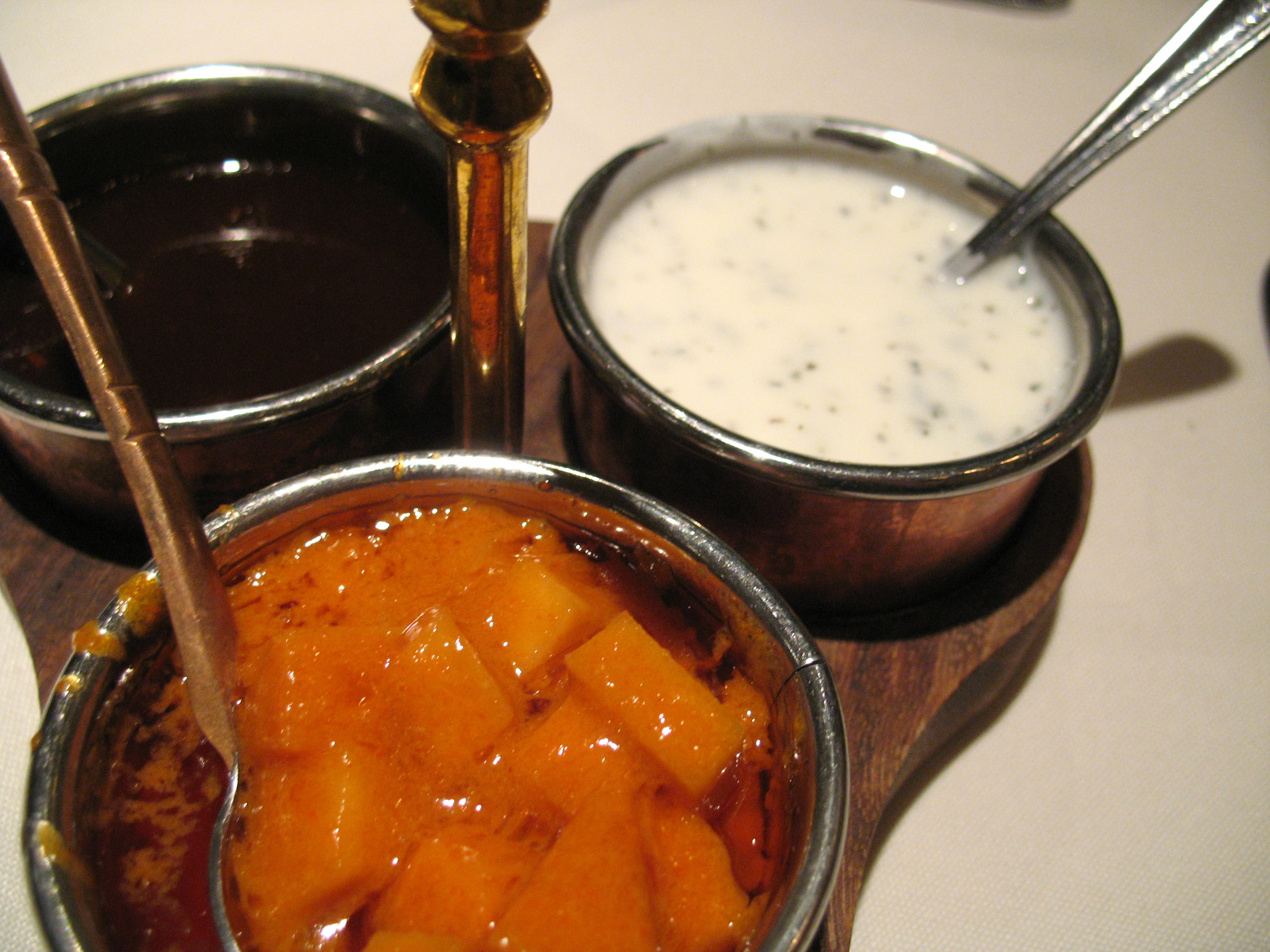
Chutneys served with the main dish in an Indian restaurant, Canada

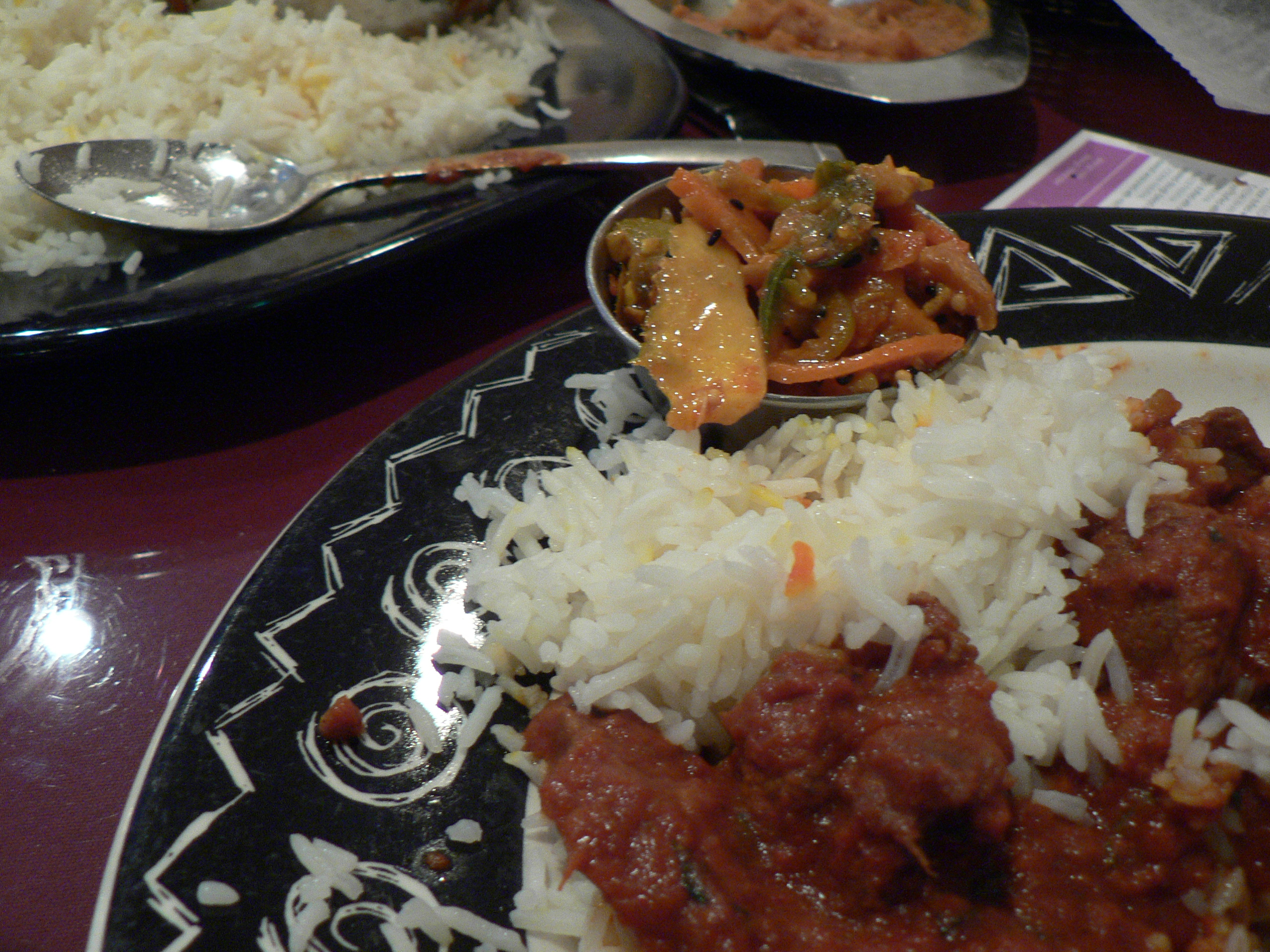
Mango chutney, America

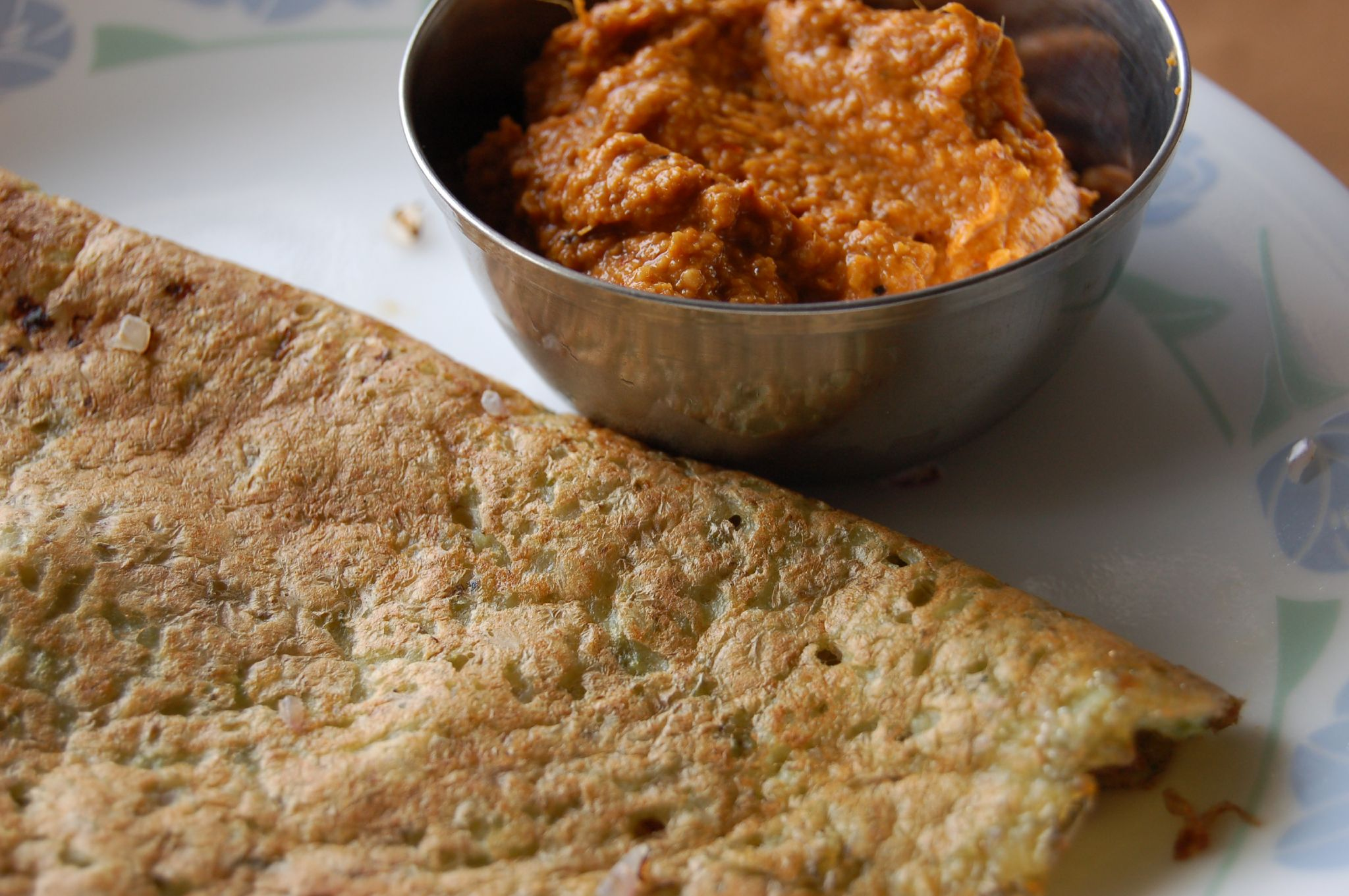
Pesarattu bread with ginger chutney, Pakistan

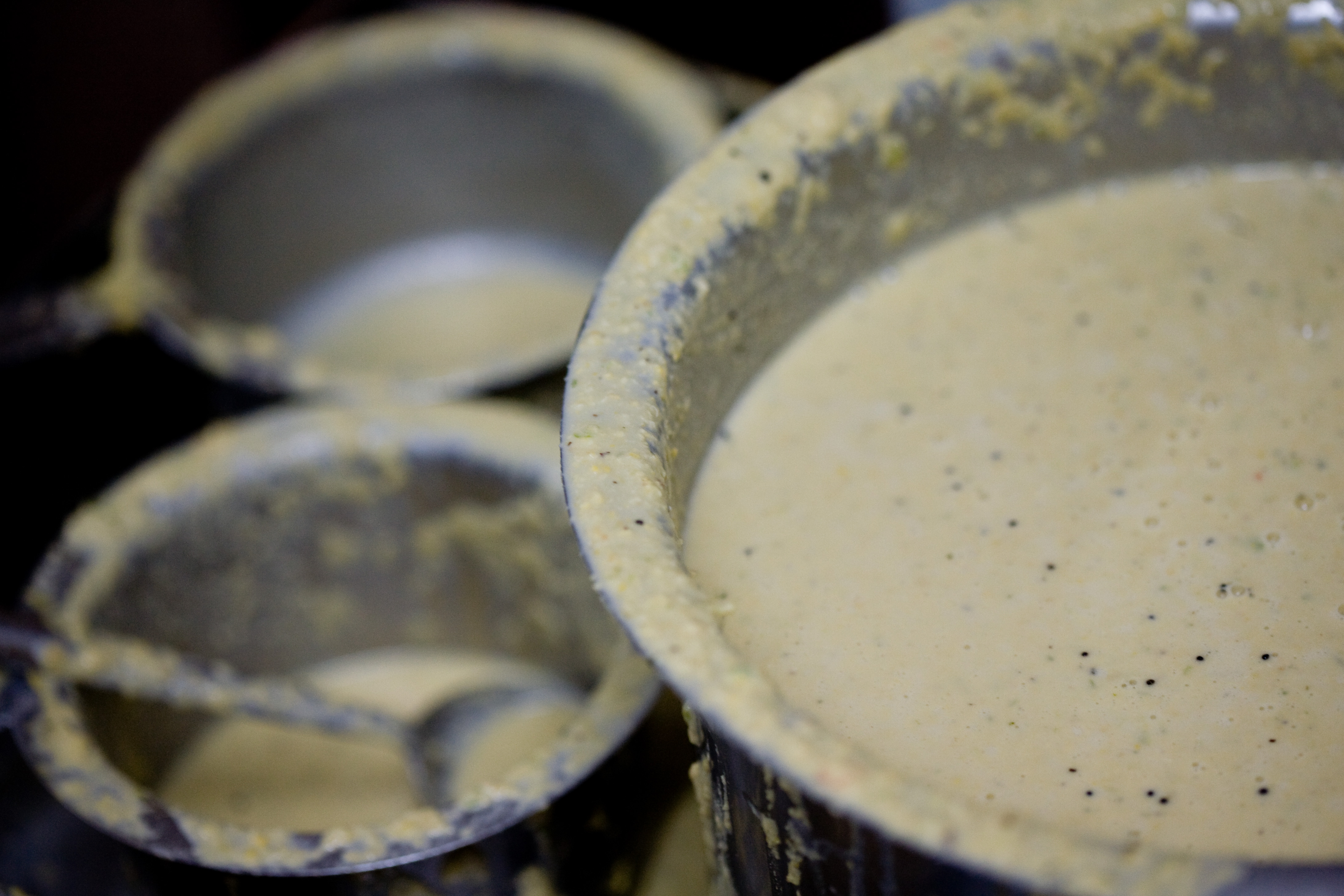
Fresh coconut chutney, Bangalore

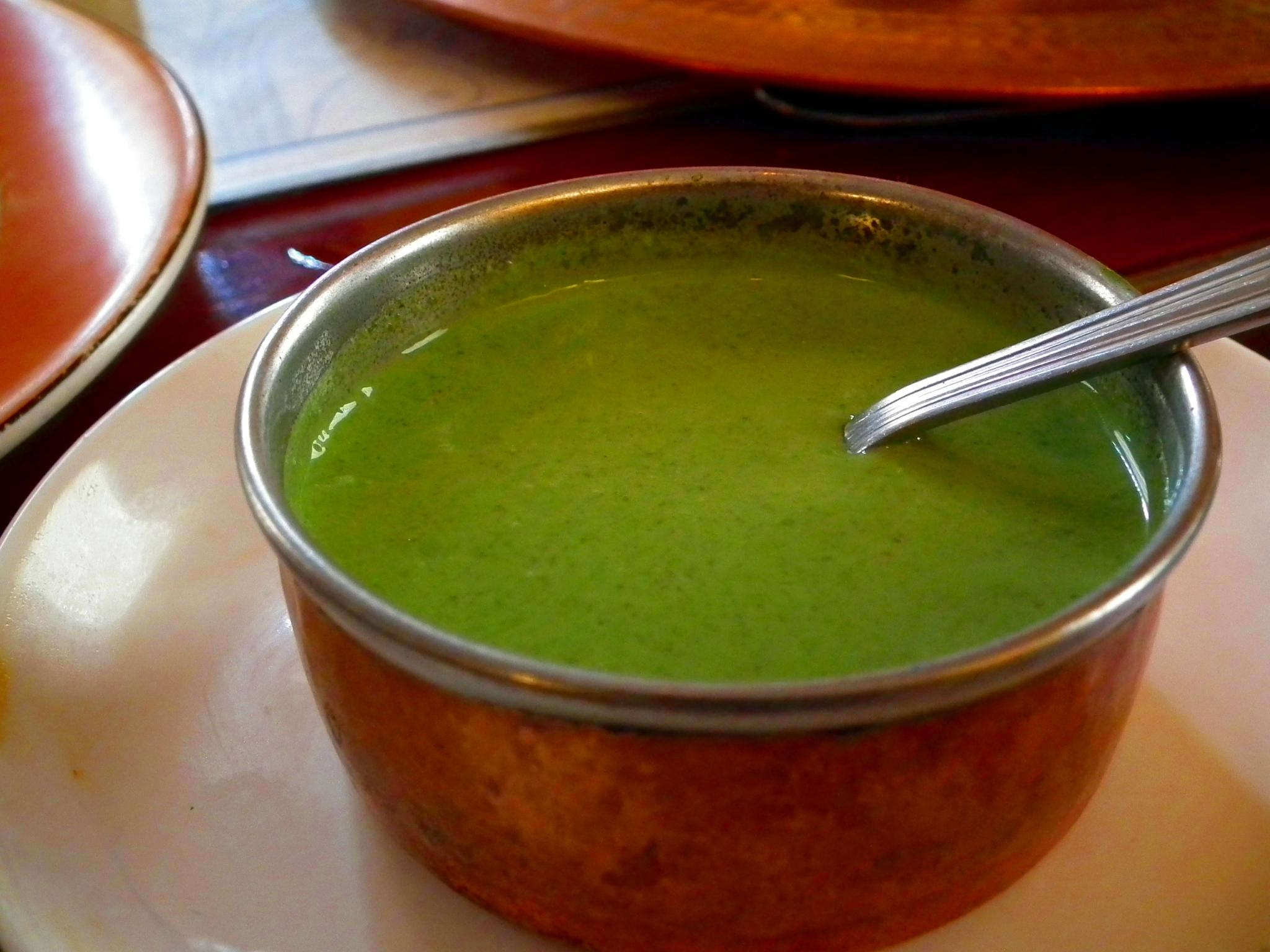
Mint chutney, India

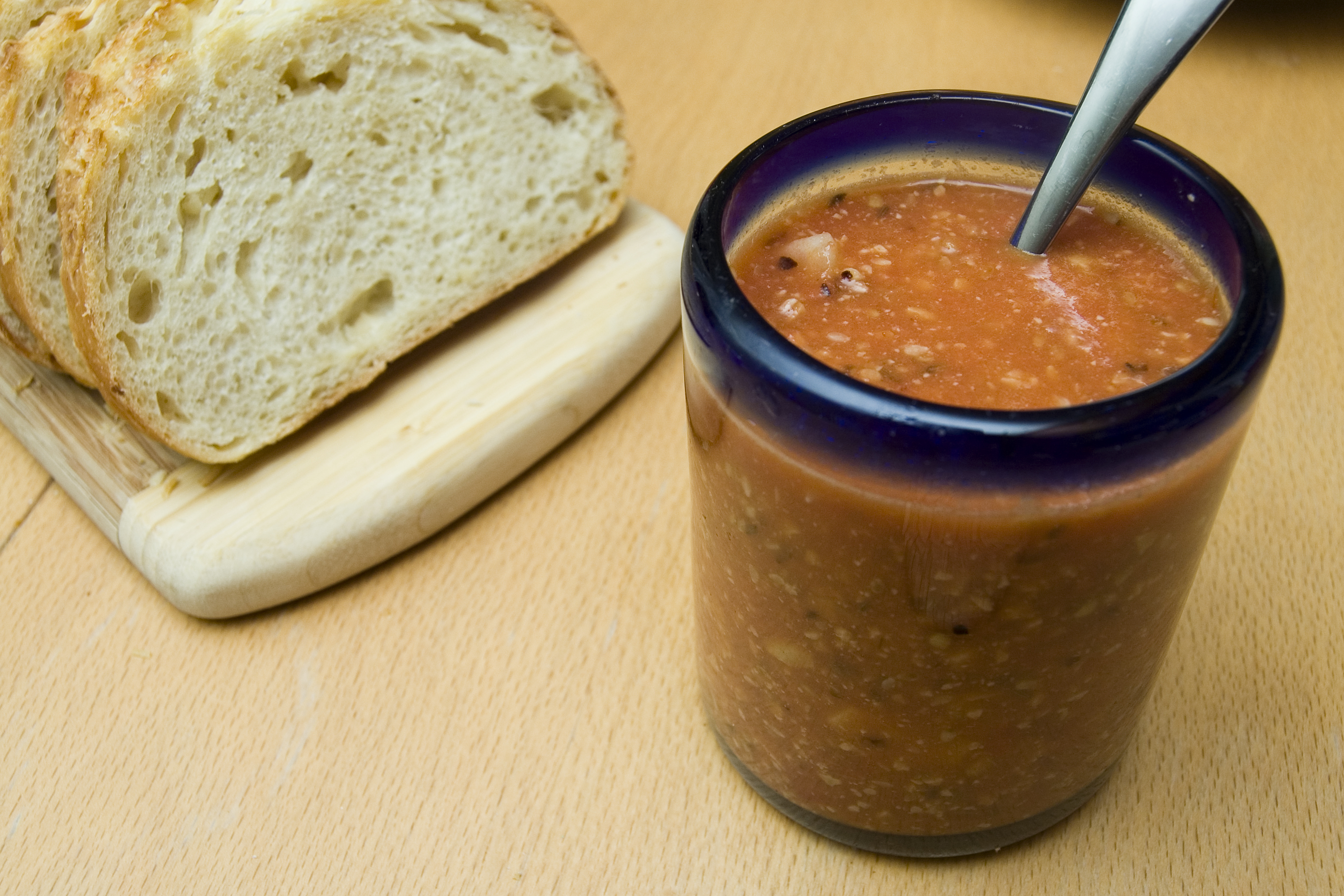
Homemade tomato chutney, America

Smoked Dry Fish and Tomato Chutney

== History ==
The historian of food Pushpesh Pant suggests that basic chutneys could be the first foods prepared by hunter-gatherers, as they crushed seeds, fruits, and berries to a paste and ate it with raw or cooked foods, making them more palatable.

=== Indian cuisine ===
Several accounts of the early 16th century describe chutneys being eaten. Duarte Barbosa's Book of Duarte Barbosa, written around 1516, narrates scenes in the far south of India of chutney being served to the raja in silver dishes alongside curries and sauces. The Krishnamangal, ascribed to Krishnadasa Kaviraja and published around a decade later, describes chutney prepared in Bengal in a worship context, accompanying dishes including greens and soups.

The kitchens of the Mughal court prepared feasts of many dishes, including numerous chutneys with ingredients as diverse as dried fruits, rose petals, and saffron. A story runs that the emperor Shah Jahan's (r. 1628–1658) physicians advised him to eat chutneys with herbs and spices for his digestion.

Chutneys have evolved across India into many regional varieties, such as Karnataka's coconut chutney. Odisha's chaprah chutney, recognised with a geographical indication tag in 2024, is made with red ants as well as chili, garlic, and ginger; the ants directly make the chutney sour with their formic acid. A chutney made with dried fish has been thought to have soothing properties, such as when a person is suffering from malaria.

=== Anglo-Indian ===
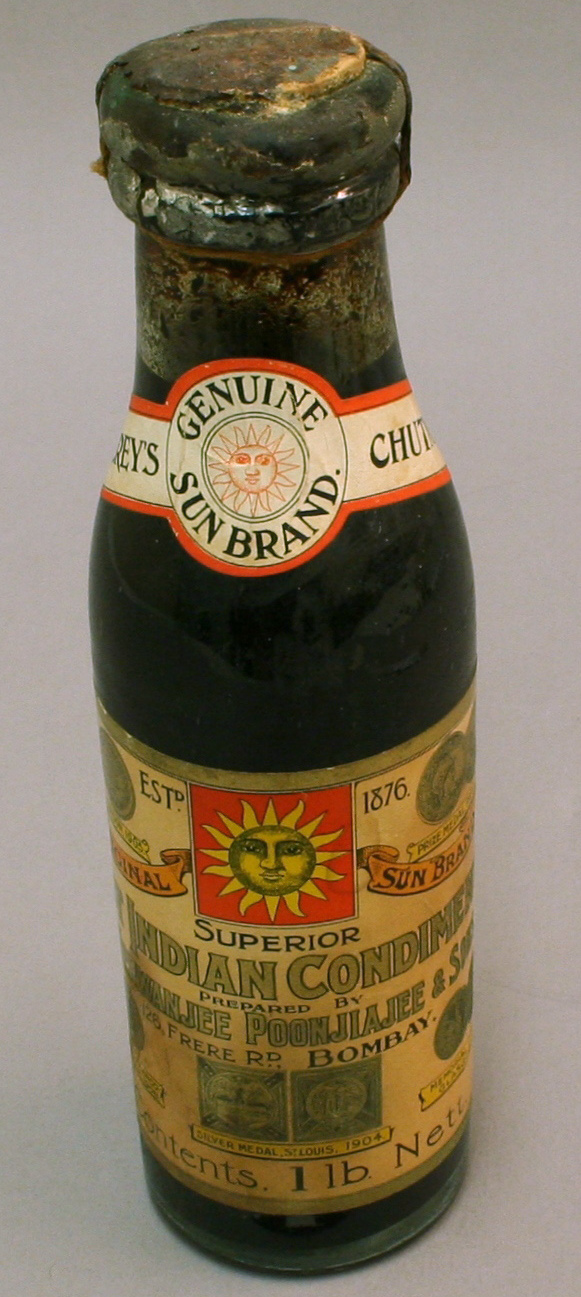
Major Grey's Chutney, 1904

In the 17th century, in the time of the East India Company, British travellers to India noticed the many pickles (achar) and chutneys. Sailors found that the preserve-like varieties were useful accompaniments to their maritime diet of salt meat and dry ship's biscuit. Quantities were brought home to Britain, whether by individual travellers or by merchants, soon to be copied by cooks.

During the British Raj, the British in India prepared many kinds of chutney in their Anglo-Indian cuisine. For the sweet chutneys, fruits such as mango are cooked with sugar, vinegar, and spices. Uncooked chutneys use ingredients such as green coriander leaves and coconut, flavoured with chili, tamarind, and sugar; these are prepared afresh each day. Major Grey's Chutney, a sweet and spicy variety, was supposedly created by a 19th-century British Army officer of the British Raj, adapting Indian cuisine to Anglo-Indian taste. Its characteristic ingredients are mango, raisins, vinegar, lime juice, onion, tamarind extract, sweetening and spices. Several companies produce a Major Grey's Chutney, in India, the UK and the US. The formula was sold to Crosse and Blackwell, a major British food manufacturer, probably in the early 1800s.

=== British ===
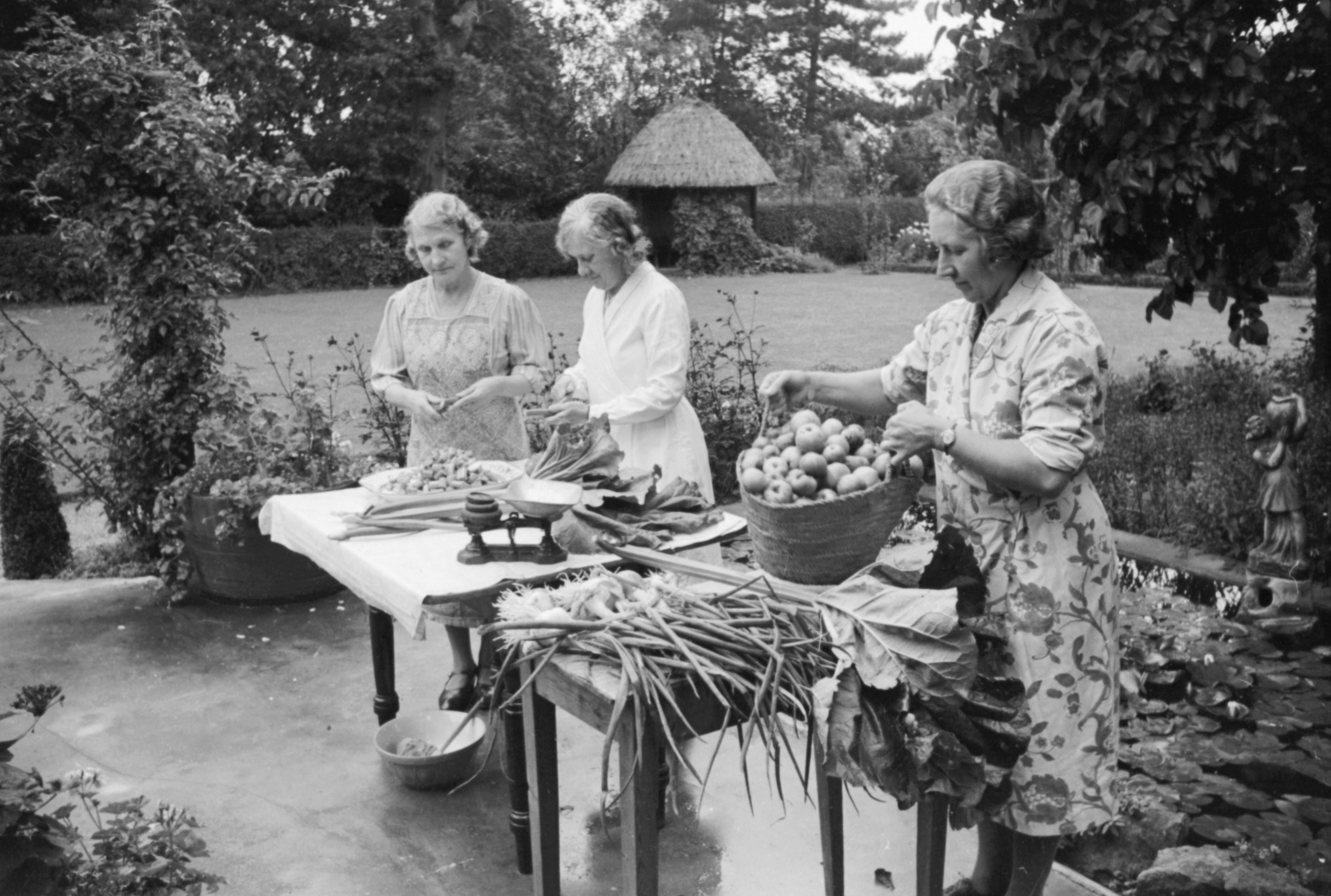
Members of Springfield Women's Institute (WI) in Essex make chutney at a table set up in the garden of the rectory, August 1941

In 1896, Edward Palmer founded Veeraswamy & Co. in London, importing chutneys, spices, and curry pastes from India. Instead of Indian limes, mangoes, and tamarind, British cooks used fresh fruits and vegetables such as apples, marrows, and onions, with the addition of dried sultanas. Hot British spices like mustard powder and horseradish substituted for chili. Influenced by Anglo-Indian cuisine, chutney is often eaten with hard cheese or with cold meats. Western-style chutneys may include spices and flavourings such as salt, garlic, tamarind, onion or ginger. A 1998 report on the European ethnic foods market stated that Britain had spent £7.7 million in the previous year on mango chutney alone. Ameer Kotecha in The Spectator writes that the British usage of 'curry' specifically means "the British reinvention of Indian cuisine", including components of the meal like mango chutney.

=== To other countries ===
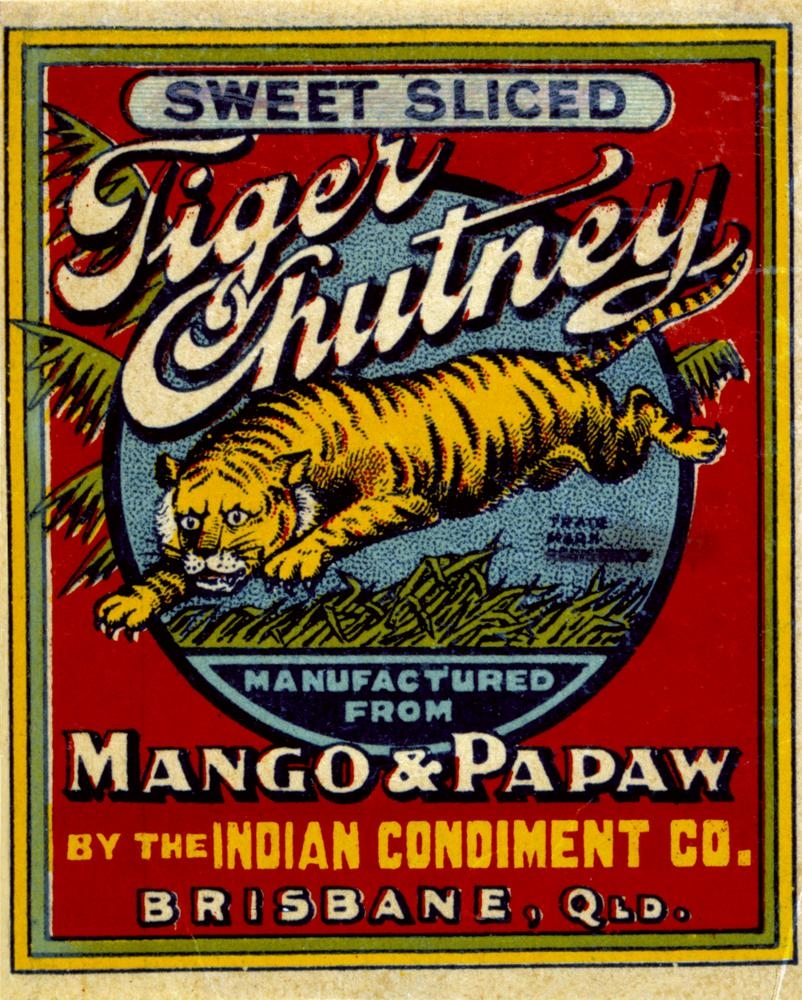
Tiger Chutney, Australia, 1950s

In the 18th century, chutney spread from Britain to the American colonies, and then across Europe, eventually becoming a global dish. In the 19th century, British merchants brought indentured Indian sugar workers to the Caribbean; some later settled there, bringing their cuisine with them. In Trinidad and Tobago, chutneys are mostly made from green mangoes, coconut or tamarind. Indian pickles (achar) and chutneys such as mango chutney are used in Malaysian cuisine.

South African Cape Malay chutneys are called blatjang, and are at least somewhat spicy. They can be made using fruits such as apricots, mangoes, or peaches, cooked with vinegar, brown sugar, onions, garlic, and spices. In Australia, "Tiger Chutney. Pawpaw and Mango, made by the Indian Condiment Co." was advertised in the 1950s.

In 2024, chutneys (as a class) were placed 41st on the Taste Atlas 100 Best Dips in the World, while coriander chutney was 47th, green chutney 48th, and mango chutney 49th. In the 21st century, a World Chutney Day is celebrated annually on 24 September.

== In culture ==
The 2016 Hindi short film Chutney involves an excellent chutney alongside "an exceptionally creepy piece of storytelling" as a timid wife starts to spar with her husband's mistress. The 2024 Tamil-language comedy drama television series Chutney Sambar, named for two contrasting condiments that together make a meal tasty, is described by The Hindu as "a delectable watch" because of the interaction of the contrasting characters who run two different food outlets.

In countries such as Guyana, Suriname, and Trinidad, with a significant Indian diaspora population where chutneys continue to be eaten, "chutney" names a music and dance tradition derived from the North Indian sthai-antar refrain-verse musical structure, with a rapid tempo; it symbolises the diaspora's cultural identity.

== See also ==
- Branston pickle – British food brand known for its pickled chutney
- Furikake – Japanese seasoning
- Indian pickle – Pickled varieties of vegetable and fruit
- Sooth (chutney) – Sweet chutney
- Ketchup – Sauce used as a condiment

== Sources ==
- Brown, Patricia (24 February 1998). Anglo-Indian Food and Customs. Penguin Books India. ISBN 0-14-027137-6.
- Collingham, Lizzie (2006) [2005 (Chatto & Windus)]. Curry: A Tale of Cooks and Conquerors. London: Vintage Books. ISBN 978-0-099-43786-4.
- Davidson, Alan (2014). "chutney". In Tom Jaine (ed.). The Oxford Companion to Food (3rd ed.). Oxford: Oxford University Press. ISBN 978-0-19-967733-7.
- Helstosky, Carol (2014). The Routledge History of Food. Routledge Histories. Taylor & Francis. ISBN 978-1-317-62113-3.
- Jaffrey, Madhur (1982). Madhur Jaffrey's Indian Cookery. London: BBC. ISBN 978-0-563-16491-3.
- Prince, Thane (2016) [2008]. Thane Prince's Jams & Chutneys: Preserving the Harvest. DK. ISBN 978-0241255667.
- Raghavan, Susheela (2006). "Pickle and Chutney Blends". Handbook of Spices, Seasonings, and Flavorings (Second ed.). CRC Press. ISBN 978-1-4200-0436-6.
- Winer, Lise (2009). Dictionary of the English/Creole of Trinidad & Tobago. Montreal: McGill-Queen's University Press. ISBN 978-0-7735-3406-3.
