= Sabudana vada =

Tapioca pearl fritters from Maharashtra, India

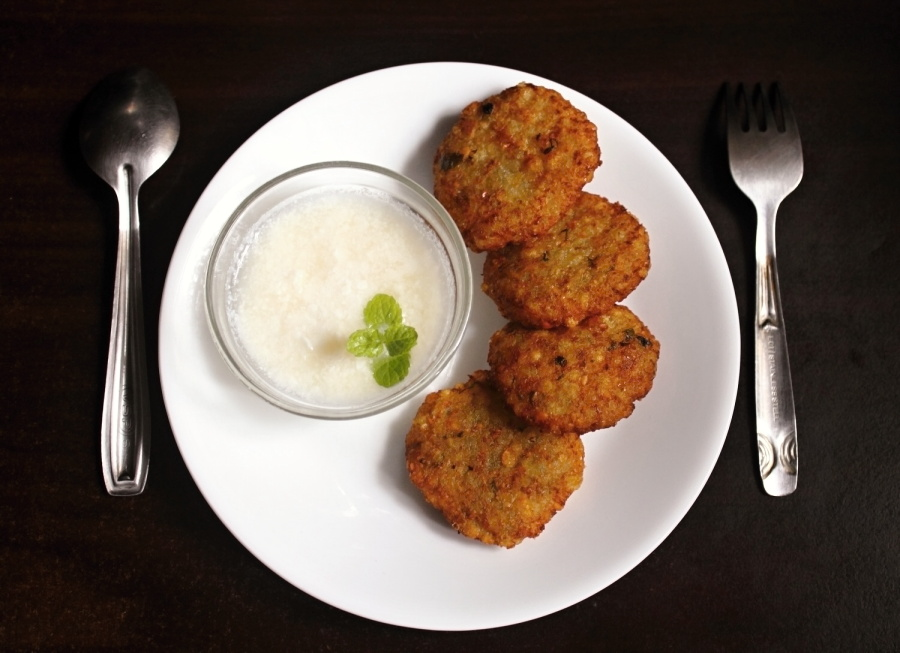
- Alternative names: Sabu vada
- Place of origin: India
- Region or state: Maharashtra
- Main ingredients: Tapioca pearls (sabudana), potato, peanuts, ginger, green chili, baking powder, seasoning

Sabudana vada, also called 'sabu vada', is a traditional deep-fried fritter from Maharashtra, India. It is made from tapioca pearls (sabudana), mashed potatoes, peanuts and spices. It is often served with a spicy green chutney along with hot chai and is best eaten fresh. In other parts of the country, Sabudana vada is the best option to have when fasting. It's usually eaten during religious festivals and during fast/vrat/upvaas, especially in Navratri vrats. Like all vadas, these are best eaten fresh. Sabudana vadas are crunchy and "melt in the mouth."

== Preparation ==
The white tapioca pearls or sabudana are soaked in water for several hours to soften them. The softened sabudana is mixed with cooked mashed potatoes, roasted crushed peanuts and a few herbs and spices and seasoned with lemon juice, sugar and salt. Round patties are formed from this mix which are deep-fried.

== Serving ==
During the monsoon season, it is popular to eat bhajias/pakoras (fried snack) with a cup of adrak chai (ginger tea). One such monsoon special crispy fried preparation is sabudana vada. Although it is deep fried, it is sumptuous and light. It is also eaten on days of fasting in Maharashtra e.g., Chaturthi etc.

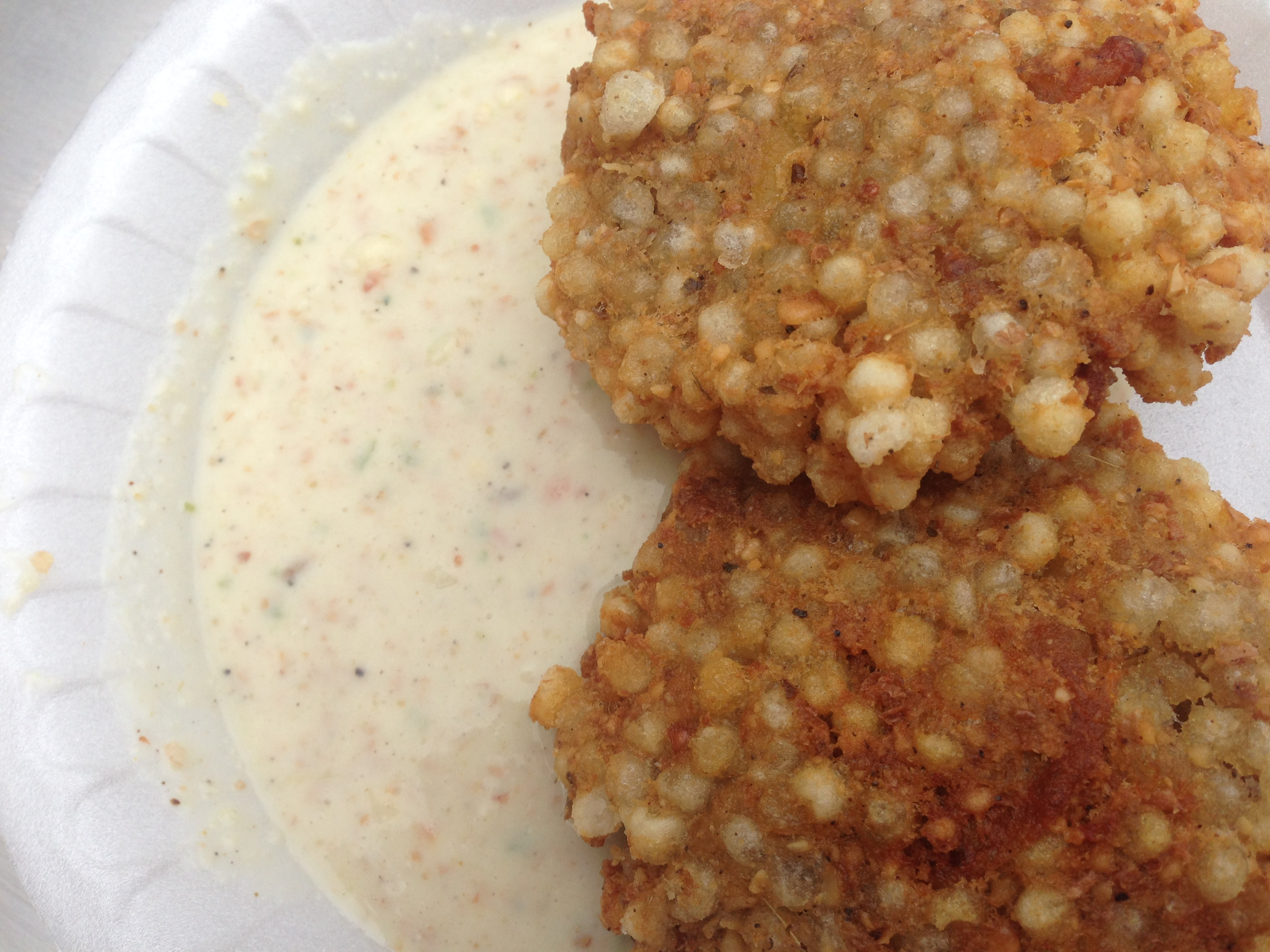
Closeup of sabudana vada with chutney

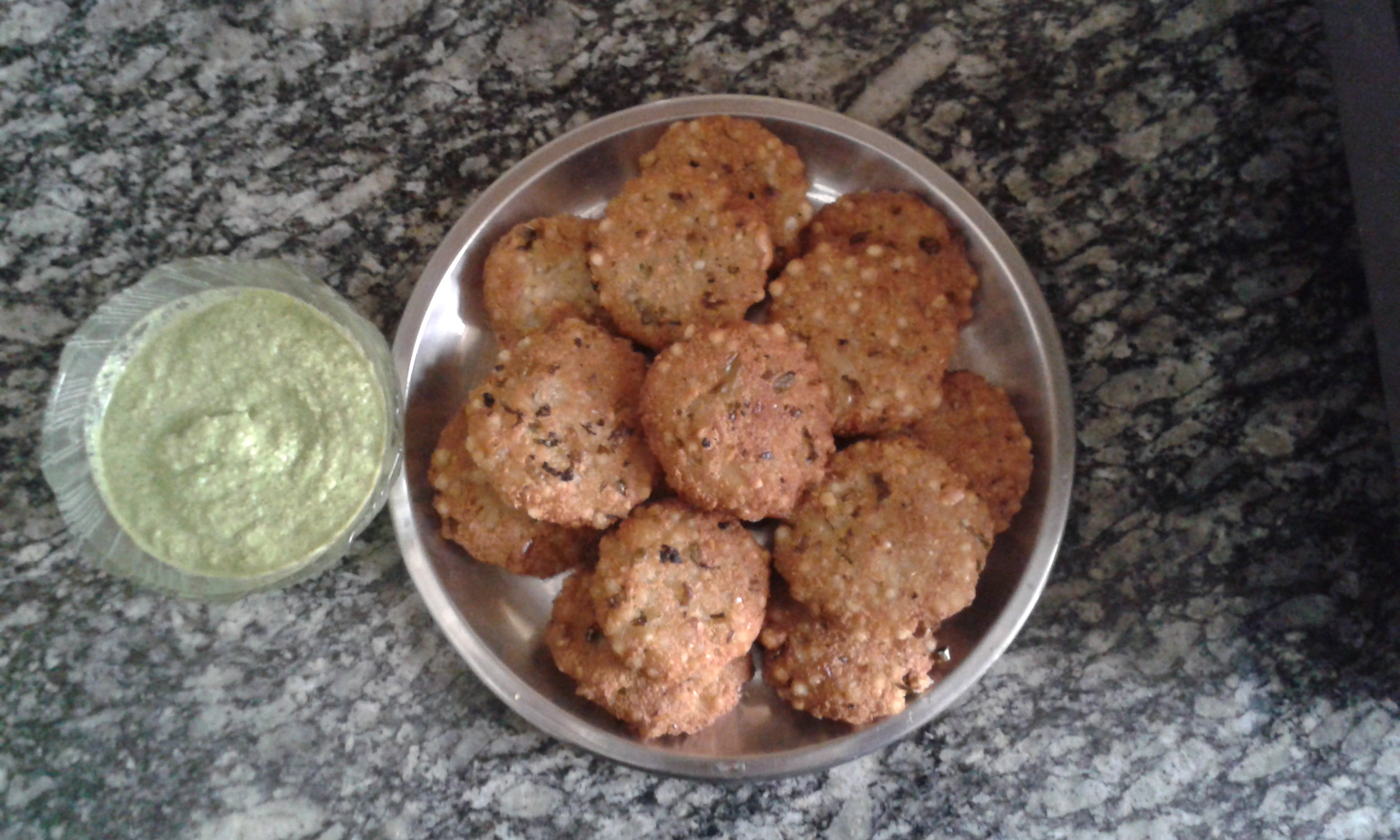
Sabudana Vada With Yogurt-Cilantro Chutney

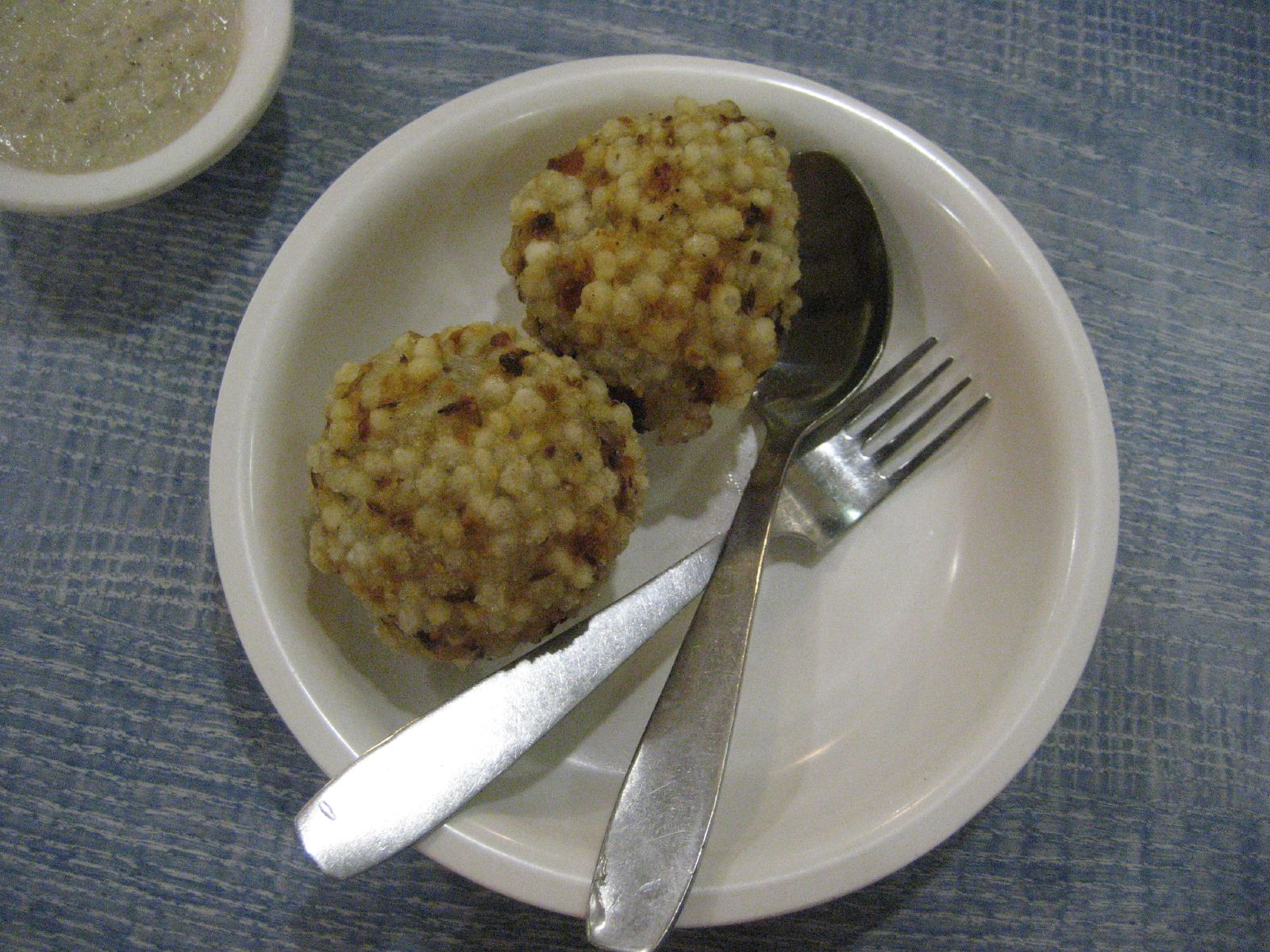
Sabudana Wada

== See also ==
- List of doughnut varieties
- List of fried dough varieties
