= Pakodanomics =

Indian economic policies

Pakodanomics refers to the economic policies instituted in India to encourage self employment and entrepreneurship. This expression originated during an exclusive interview by Zee Media of the Prime Minister of India, Narendra Modi, with regards to answering the queries in relation to game changing economic reforms. Since then, this particular utterance has made its rounds within the Indian subcontinent and has received blazing criticism from the members of the Opposition members as well as economic commentators.

The term 'Pakodanomics' has been coined by columnist Vivek Kaul, who also prefers the term bondanomics.

== History ==
The term originated from a comment made by the Prime Minister of India, Narendra Modi in January 2018 stating that street food vendors (selling pakodas) should also be considered in employment statistics and hence unemployment in the country is actually much lower than statistically reported.

One of the main concerns of the Indian economy during the BJP government has been increasing employment opportunities for the huge number of youth entering the work force. It is estimated that over one million new people join the work force every month in India while the economy added approximately half a million formal jobs in the whole of the previous year.

Pakodanomics was also a result of demonetization which was the sudden banning of 86% of currency in India in November 2016 that led to major economic upheaval.

Pakodanomics also became a light-hearted reference to the economic policies of the government and there were many comedic references at campaign rallies and on television. Commentators seriously tried to dissect the government's policies and realized that in fact that the policies of the government were not generating enough formal employment.
