= Medu vada =

Deep-fried Indian food item

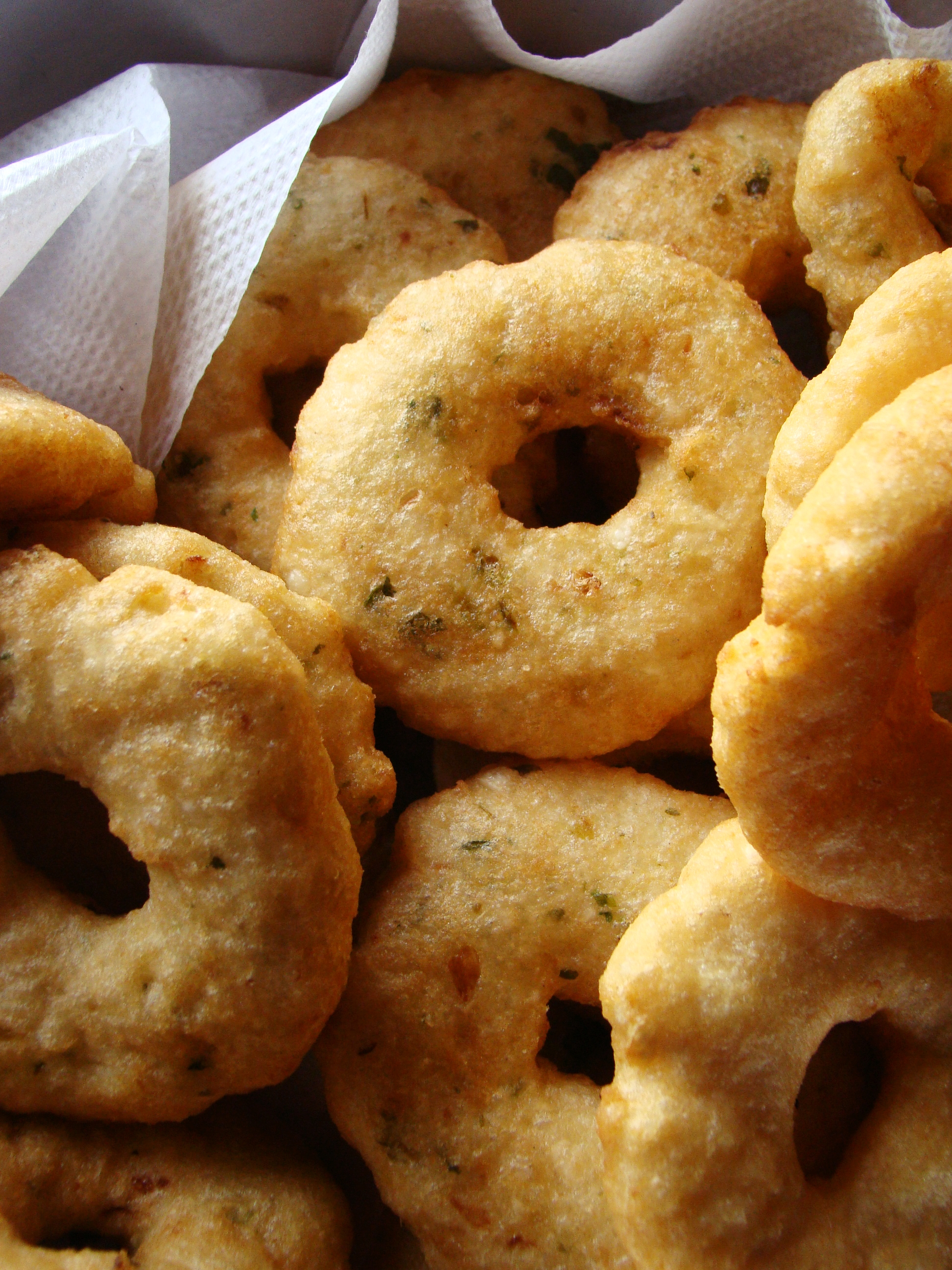
- Alternative names: Garelu, Uddina vade, Medhu vada, Uddi vada, Minapa garelu, Uzhunnu vada, Udid Vada, Ulundu vadai, Urad vada, Ulundu wade, Urdi bara, Batuk
- Type: Fritter
- Course: Breakfast
- Place of origin: India
- Region or state: South India, Sri Lanka
- Serving temperature: Warm (with sambar and coconut chutney) or room temperature (with yogurt)
- Main ingredients: Urad dal (Split Black gram), Rice
- Similar dishes: Other vadas, mat pe kyaw

Medu vada (pronounced [meːd̪ʊ vəɽaː]; lit. 'soft vada' in Tamil and Kannada) is a South Indian breakfast snack made from Vigna mungo (black lentil). It is usually made in a doughnut shape, with a crispy exterior and soft interior. A popular food item in South Indian cuisine it is generally eaten as a breakfast or a snack.

== Etymology ==
"Medu" (Kannada: ಮೆದು, Tamil: மெது) means "soft" in both languages, thus "medu vada" means "soft vada". The dish is often mentioned simply as "vada" on menus. Other names for the dish include uddina vade Kannada, urad vada, medhu vadai, uzhundu vadai (Tamil), garelu (Telugu), uzhunnu vada (Malayalam), bataka (Nepali).

== History ==
According to Vir Sanghvi, the origin of medu vada can be traced with "some certainty" to the Maddur town in present-day Karnataka. The dish was made popular outside South India by Udupi restaurateurs of Mumbai.

== Preparation ==
The medu vada is made primarily of black lentils (urad dal) batter. The black lentils are soaked in water for several hours, and then ground to a paste. The paste may be flavoured with other ingredients such as asafoetida, methi seeds (fenugreek), ginger, cumin seeds, black pepper, curry leaves, chillies and coconut pieces. It is then patted into doughnut-shapes and fried in oil until golden brown.

One variation involves baking instead of frying. Other variations of the dish involve use of pulses other than black lentils. For example, am-bada (or aama vadai) is made with chana dal (split chickpea lentil); occasionally, tuar (pigeon pea) and masoor (lentil) are also used.

== Serving ==
The dish is usually served with sambar (lentil and vegetable stew) and coconut chutney. Along with idli, it is often eaten as a breakfast dish. It is also eaten as a lunch starter or a snack.

The medu vada is sometimes also served with yogurt, as a chaat snack (see dahi vada).

In Nepal, on the day of Maghe Sankranti, people make batuk, which is eaten with a variety of boiled tubers such as yam, taro, and sweet potato.

== Gallery ==
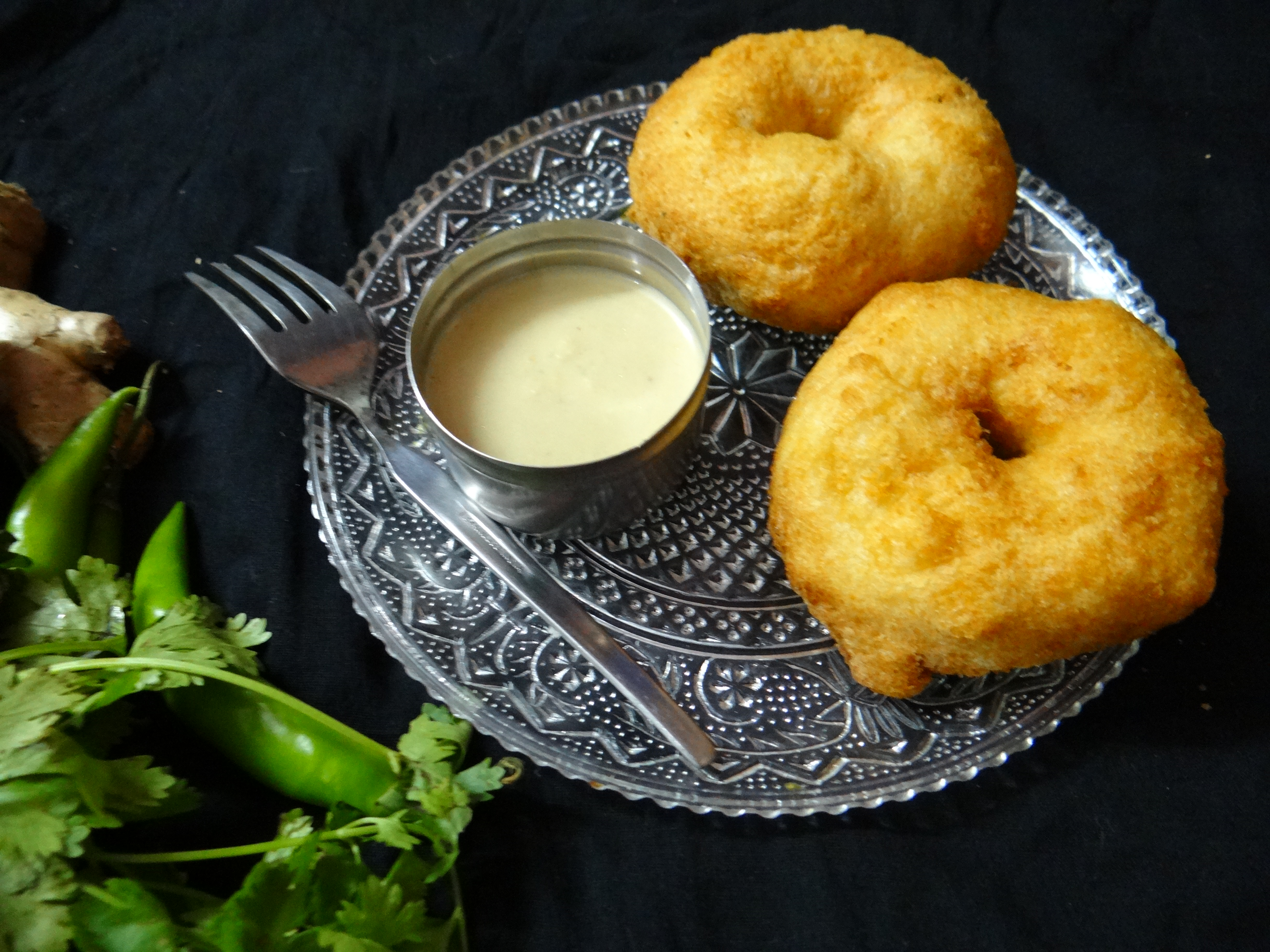
Medu vadas served with coconut chutney

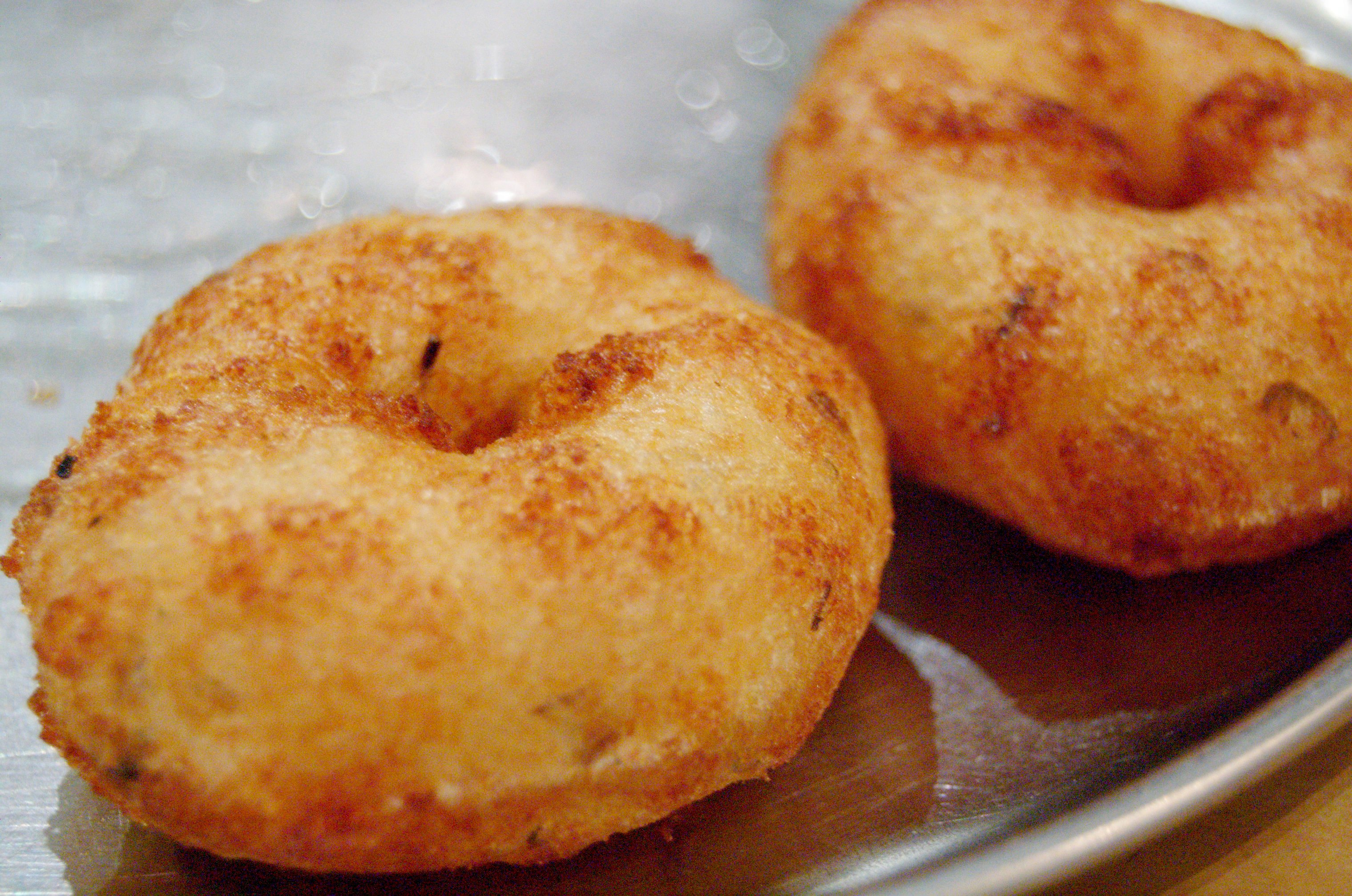
fried Medu vada with chutney

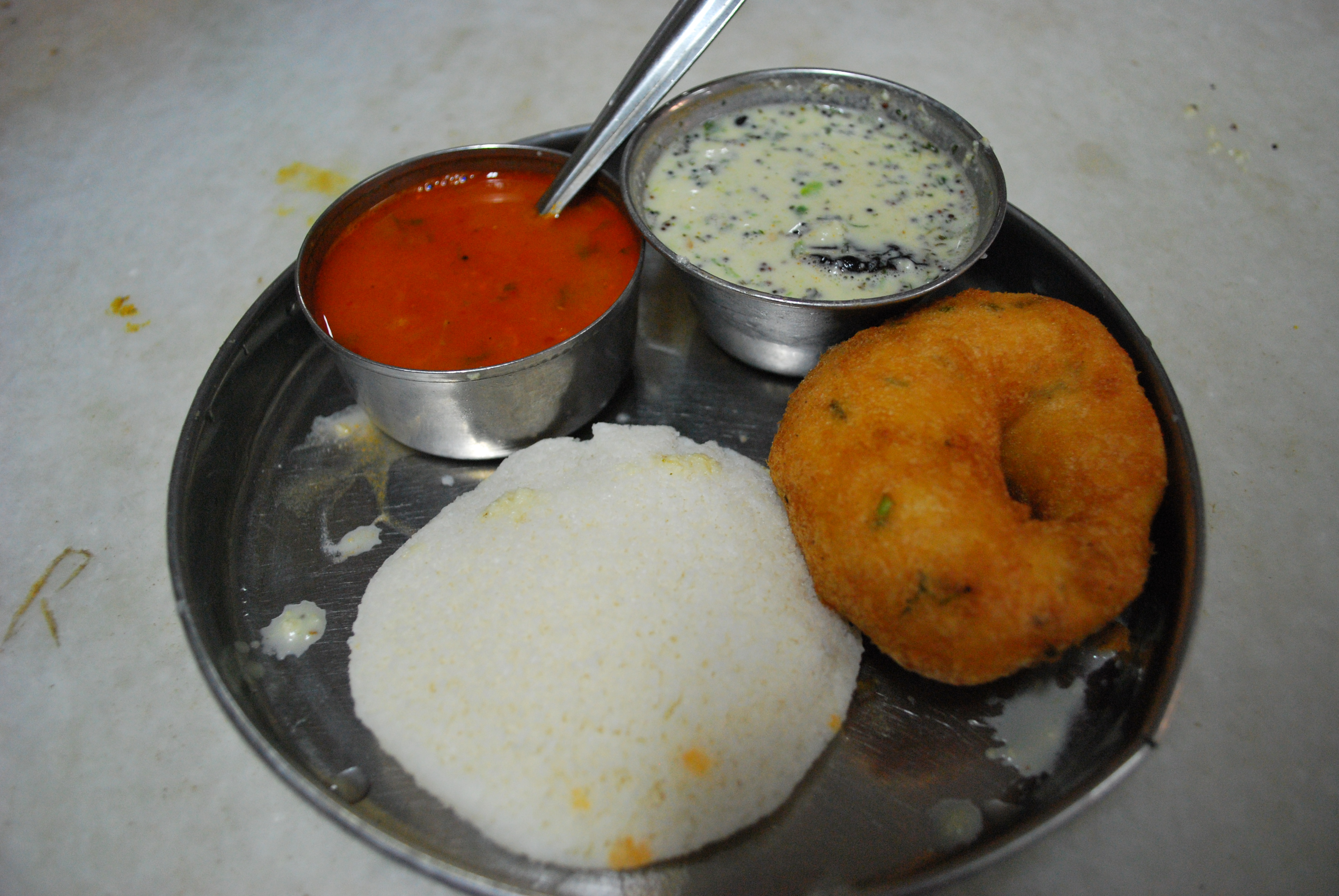
A common South Indian breakfast: idli, medu vada, sambar and coconut chutney

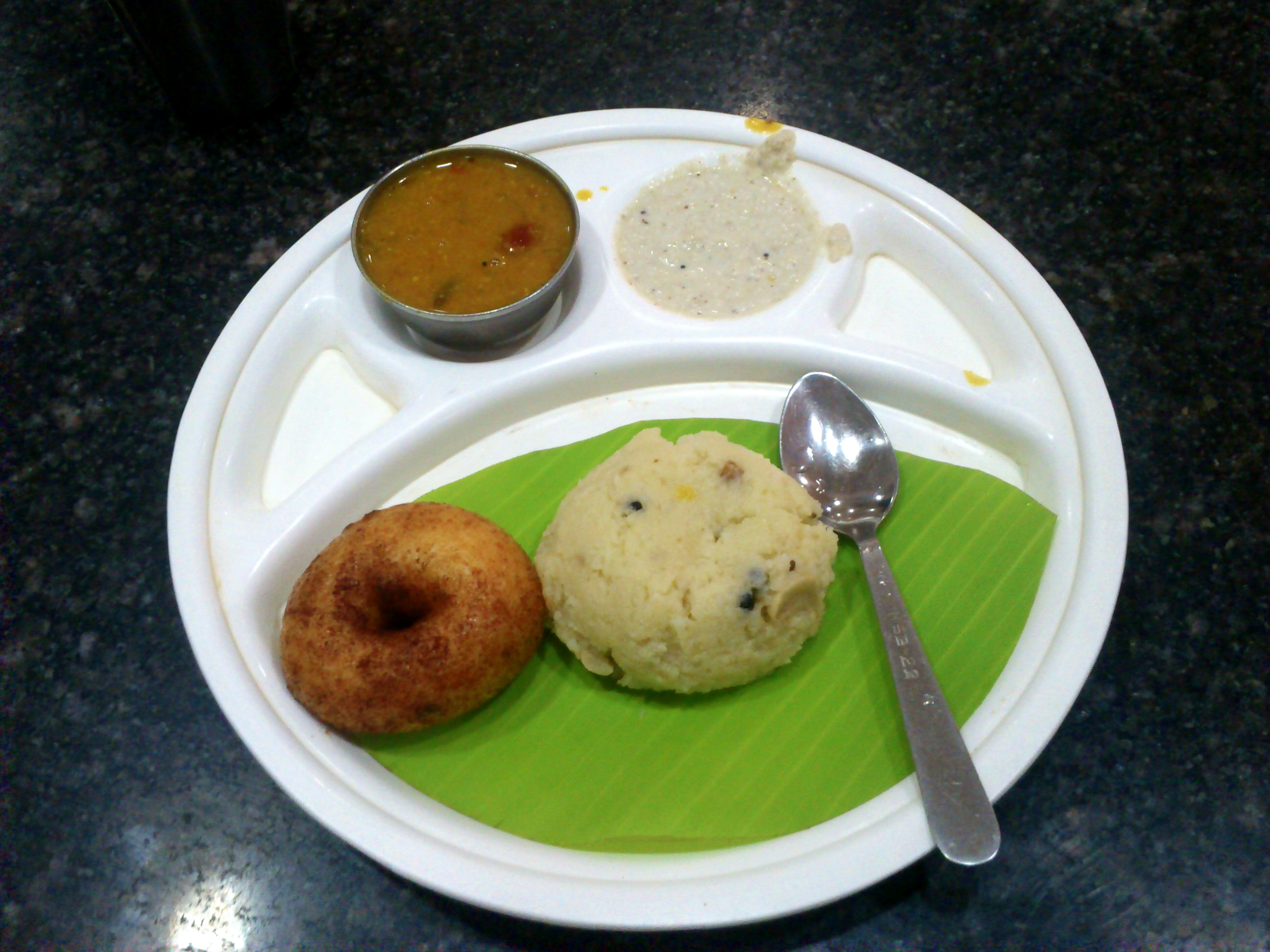
Another common breakfast: medu vada, pongal, sambar and coconut chutney

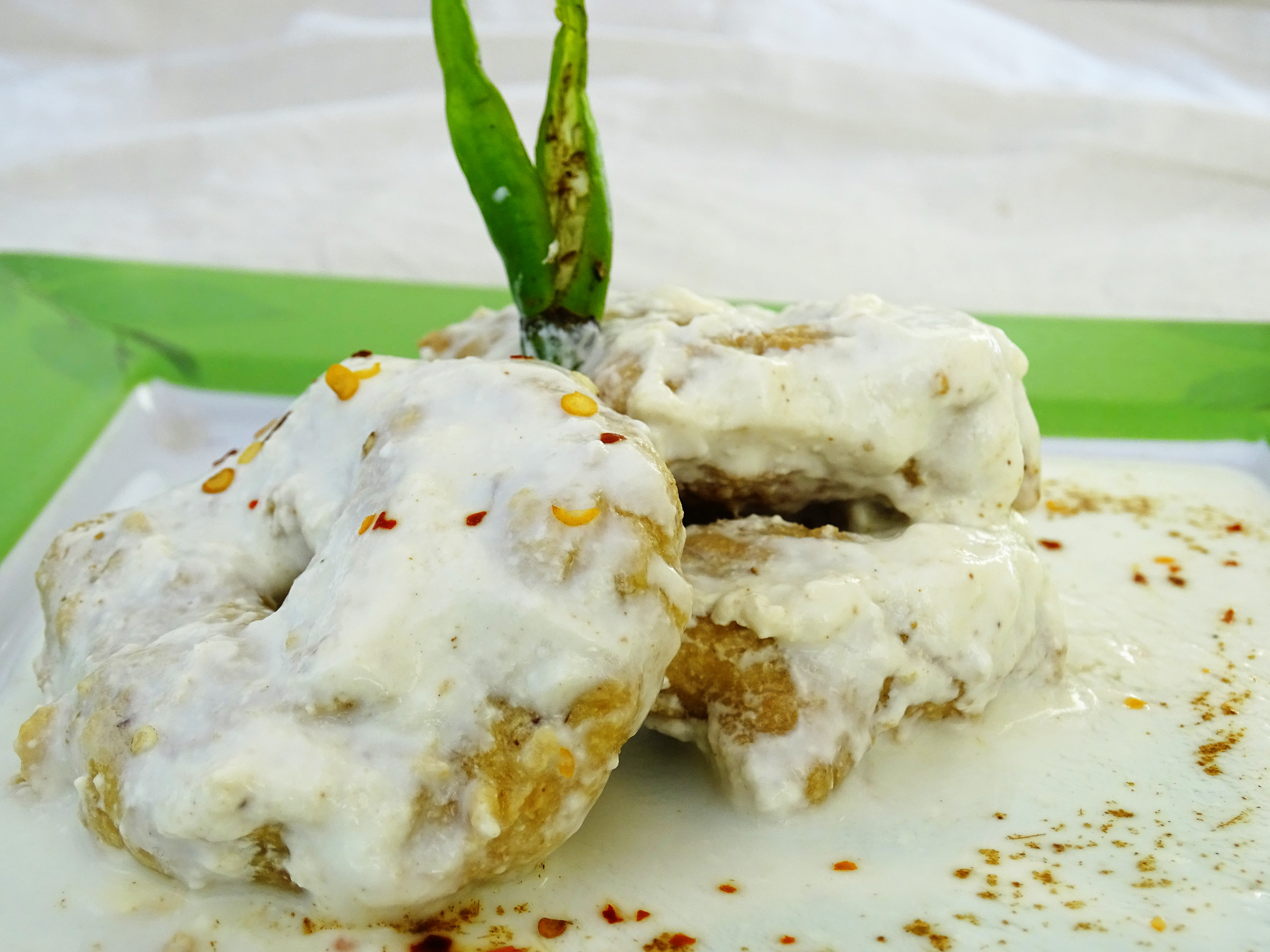
In form of dahi vada, with yogurt

== See also ==
- List of deep fried foods
- List of Indian dishes
- List of doughnut varieties
- List of fried dough varieties
