= Burmese fritters =

Battered and deep-fried savory fritters of vegetables or seafood

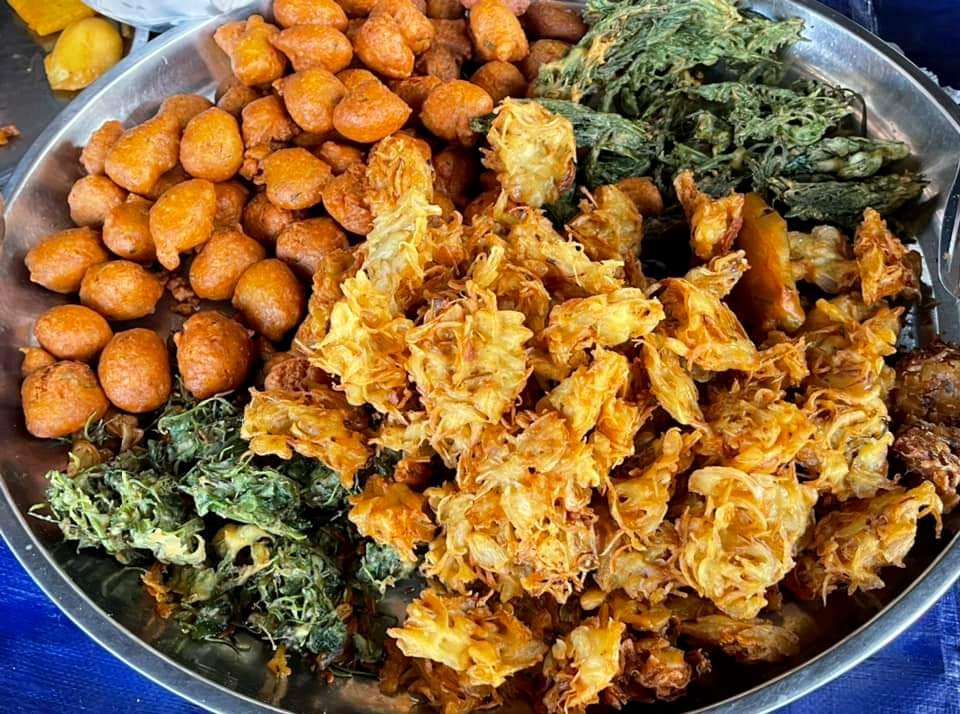
- An assortment of Burmese fritters
- Alternative names: အကြော်စုံ
- Course: Breakfast, snack (mont)
- Place of origin: Myanmar
- Region or state: Southeast Asia
- Associated cuisine: Burmese
- Main ingredients: Various
- Similar dishes: Vada, tempura, pakora, okoy, pholourie, bakwan

Burmese fritters, known in Burmese as a-kyaw (အကြော် [ʔət͡ɕɔ̀]), are traditional fritters consisting of vegetables or seafood that have been battered and deep-fried. Assorted fritters are called a-kyaw-sone (အကြော်စုံ). Burmese fritters are generally savory, and often use beans and pulses, similar to South Asian vada.

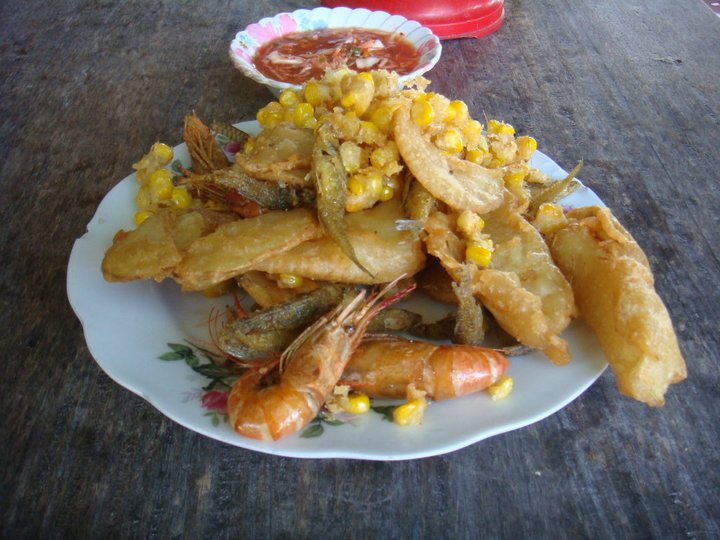
A plate of Burmese fritters

The fritters are eaten mainly at breakfast or as a snack at teatime, served at tea shops and hawker stands alike. They are typically served as standalone snacks dipped in a sour-sweet tamarind-based sauce, or as toppings for common Burmese dishes. Gourd, chickpea and onion fritters are cut into small parts and eaten with mohinga, Myanmar's national dish. These fritters are also eaten with kauk hnyin baung rice and with a Burmese green sauce called a-chin-yay (အချဉ်ရည်). Depending on the fritter hawker, the sauce is made from chili sauce diluted with vinegar, water, cilantro, finely diced tomatoes, garlic and onions.

== Variations ==
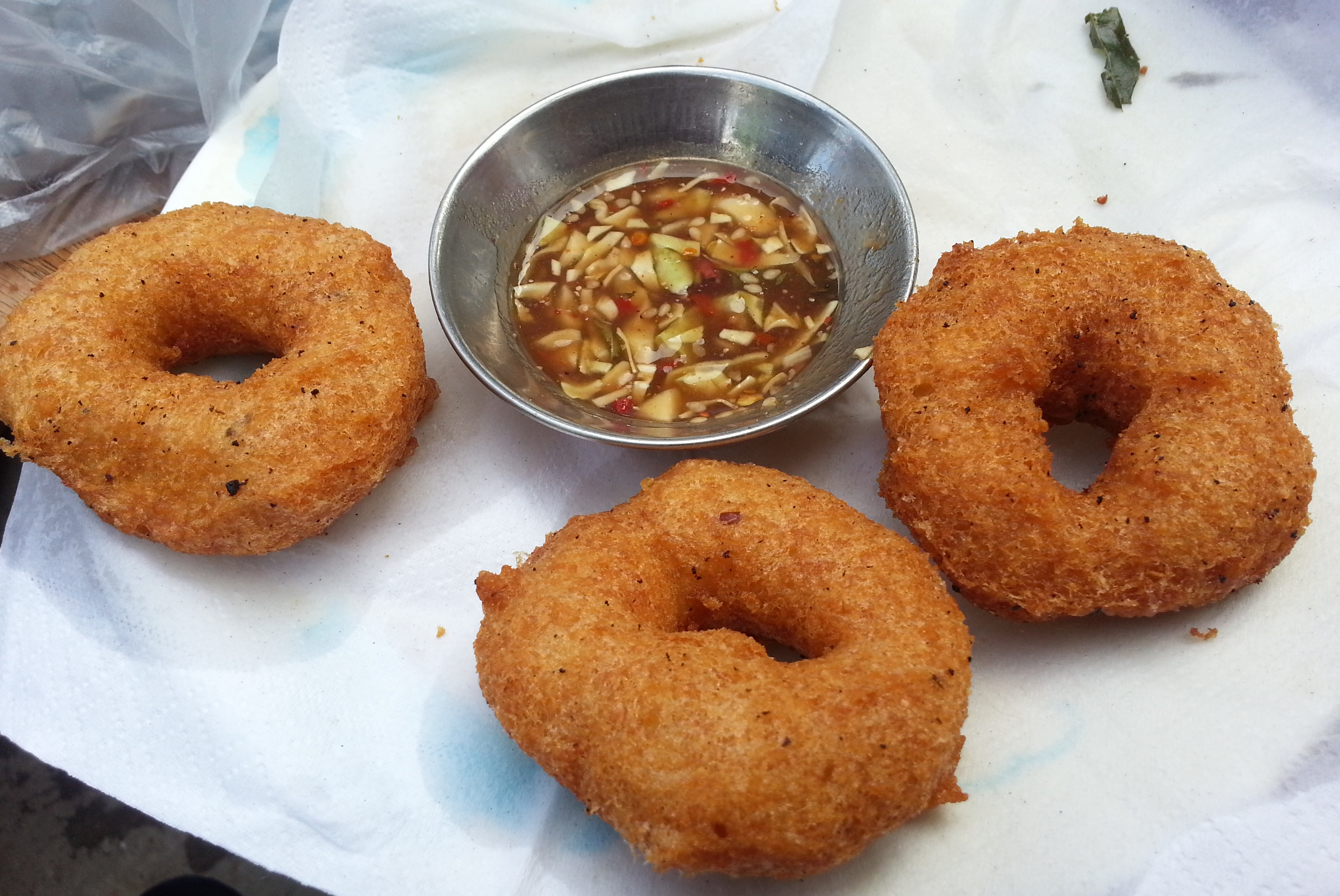
Mat pe kyaw, a fritter made with fried mung beans.

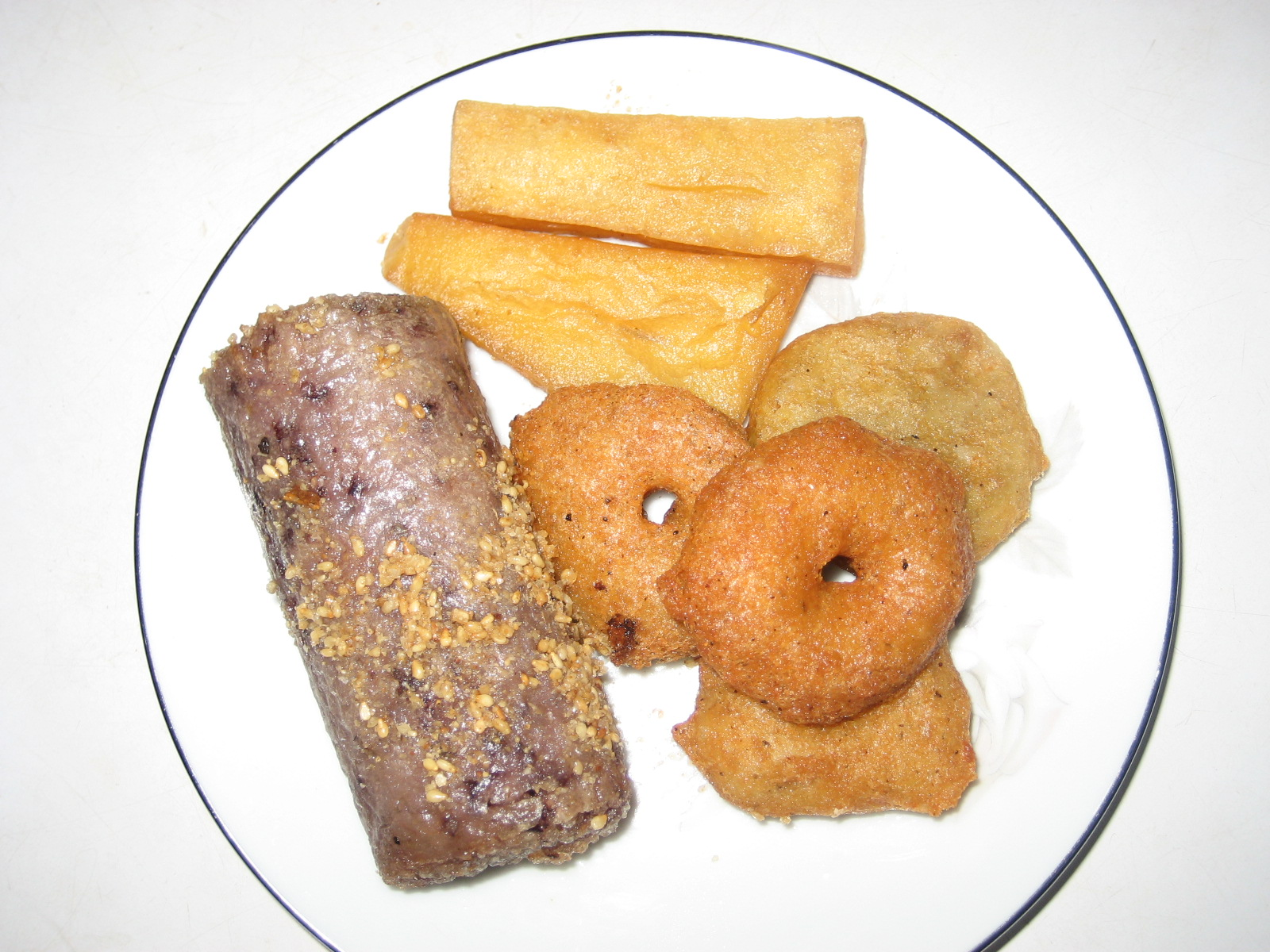
Paung din and Burmese fritters are a common breakfast food in Myanmar (Burma).

Diced onions, chickpea, potatoes, a variety of leafy vegetables, brown bean paste, Burmese tofu, chayote, banana and crackling are other popular fritter ingredients. Typical Burmese fritters include:

- Bazun khwet kyaw (ပုစွန်ခွက်ကြော်) – fritters made of bean sprouts and prawns, similar to Filipino okoy
- Kawpyant kyaw (ကော်ပြန့်ကြော်) – fried popiah filled with vegetables such as jicama, carrots, and bean sprouts
- Mandalay pe kyaw (မန္တလေးပဲကြော်) – kidney bean fritters
- Mat pe kyaw (မတ်ပဲကြော်) or Mandalay bayar kyaw (မန္တလေးဗယာကြော်) – black gram fritters, similar to South Indian medu vada
- Mont kat kyaw (မုန့်ကပ်ကြော်) – vegetable fritters battered in rice flour
  - Bu thi kyaw (ဘူးသီးကြော်) – slices of fried bottle gourd
  - Kyet thun kyaw (ကြက်သွန်ကြော်) – fried shallots or onions, similar to pakora
  - Myinkhwa ywet kyaw (မြင်းခွာရွက်ကြော်) – fried bouquets of pennywort leaves
- Mont hsi kyaw (မုန့်ဆီကြော်) – fried pancake with jaggery slices
- Ngaphe kyaw (ငါးဖယ်ကြော်) – deep-fried fishcakes made from bronze featherback flesh
- Ngapyaw kyaw (ငှက်ပျောကြော်) – banana fritters, made only with overripe bananas with no added sugar or honey
- Pe kyaw (ပဲကြော်) – fried split pea crackers that traditionally garnish mohinga
- Pyaungbu kyaw (ပြောင်းဖူးကြော်) – corn fritters similar to Indonesian bakwang jagung
- Samusa (စမူဆာ) – deep-fried potato dumplings
- Tohu kyaw (တိုဟူးကြော်) – Burmese tofu fritters
- Yangon baya kyaw (ရန်ကုန်ဗယာကြော်) – yellow split pea fritters, similar to pakora, falafel and pholourie
- Ikyakway (အီကြာ‌ကွေး) – deep-fried Chinese crullers

== Regional adaptations ==
Egg bhejo or egg bejo (Tamil: முட்டை பேஜோ or முட்டை பேஜோ) is a common Indian street snack of Burmese origin, consisting of hardboiled eggs stuffed with fried onions, garlic, coriander, and chilis and seasoned with tamarind and lemon juice. The snack traditionally accompanies khow suey or atho, both of which are adaptations of Burmese noodle salad and ohn no khao swè respectively. The term 'bhejo' is a corruption of Burmese 'pe kyaw' (ပဲကြော်), the fried split pea cracker that traditionally accompanies the aforementioned Burmese dishes.

== See also ==
- Burmese cuisine
