= Pakora =

Spiced fritter originally from the Indian subcontinent

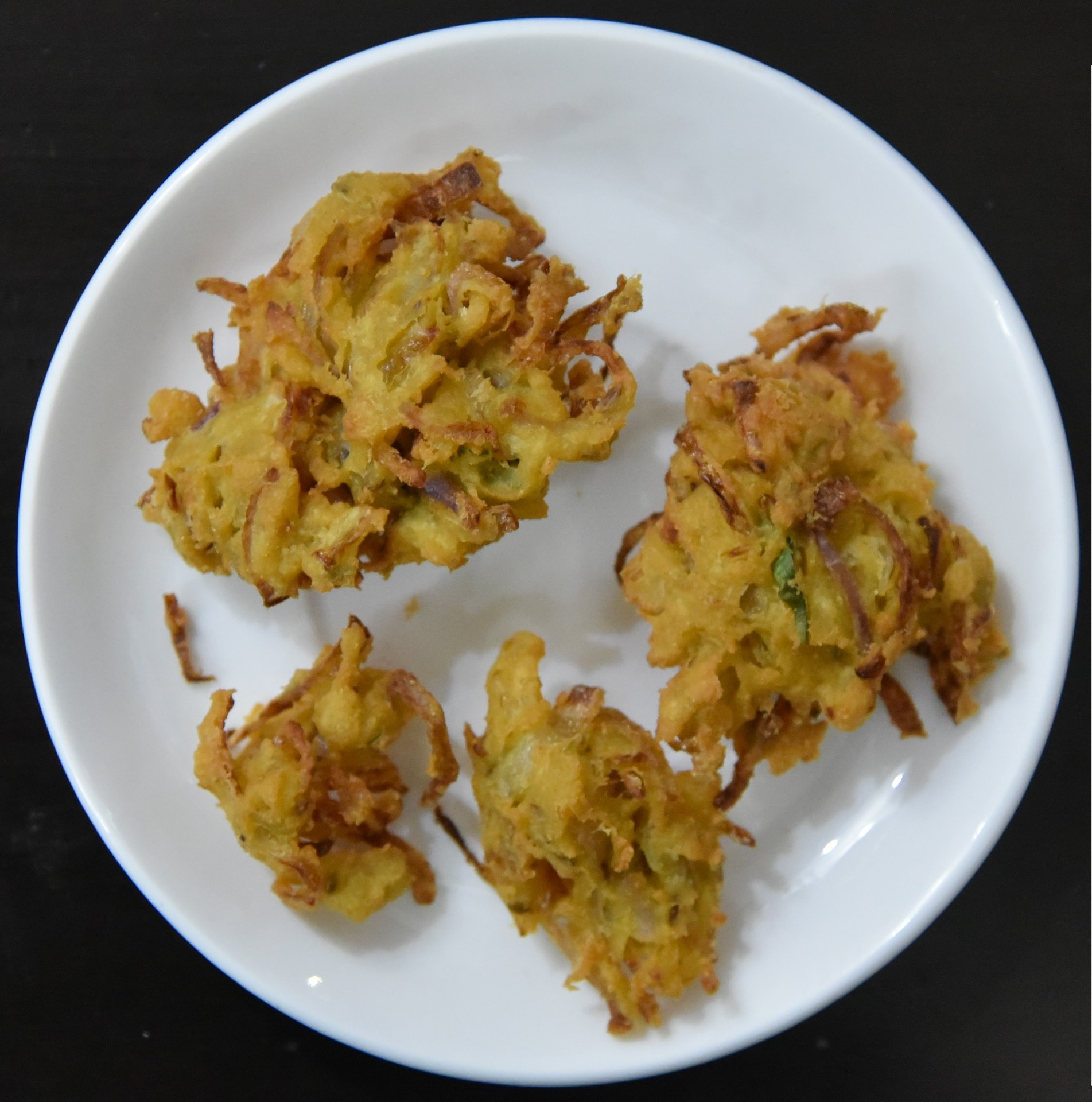
- Onion pakora
- Alternative names: Pakoda, pikora, bhajiya, pakodi, ponako, pakura, fakkura, phulauri, bora, chop
- Type: Fritter
- Course: Appetizer or snack
- Place of origin: South Asia
- Region or state: South Asia
- Associated cuisine: Indian; Nepali; Sri Lankan; Bangladeshi; Pakistani; Trinidad and Tobago; Afghan
- Main ingredients: Vegetables; gram flour; spices; onions
- Variations: Potato; Eggplant; Onion; Cauliflower; Spinach; Mixed vegetables; Paneer; Chicken
- Similar dishes: Kyet thun kyaw Pholourie

Pakora (pronounced [pəˈkɔːɽa]) is a fritter originating from the Indian subcontinent. They are sold by street vendors and served in restaurants across South Asia. They often consist of vegetables such as potatoes and onions, which are coated in seasoned gram flour batter and deep-fried.

== Etymology ==
The word pakoṛā is derived from Sanskrit पक्ववट, pakvavaṭa, a compound of pakva ('cooked') and vaṭa ('a small lump') or its derivative vaṭaka, 'a round cake made of pulse fried in oil or ghee'. The word Bhajji is derived from the Sanskrit word Bharjita meaning fried.

== History ==
An early variation of pakora appears in Sanskrit literature and Tamil Sangam literature but the recipe is not clearly provided as they only mention it as 'a round cake made of pulse fried in oil' and 'crispy fried vegetables' which were served as part of the meals. Early known recipes come from Manasollasa (1130 CE) cookbook which mentions "Parika" (pakoda) and the method of preparing it with vegetables and gram flour. Lokopakara (1025 CE) cookbook also mentions unique pakora recipe where gram flour is pressed into fish-shaped moulds and fried in mustard oil.

== Preparation ==
Pakoras are made by coating ingredients, usually vegetables, in a spiced batter, and then deep frying them. Common varieties of pakora use onion, masoor dal (lentil), suji (semolina), chicken, arbi root and leaves, eggplant, potato, chili pepper, spinach, paneer, cauliflower, mint, plantain or baby corn.

The batter is most commonly made with gram flour or a mixture of gram flour and rice flour but variants can use other flours, such as buckwheat flour. The spices used in the batter are up to the cook and may be chosen due to local tradition or availability; often these include fresh and dried spices such as chilli, fenugreek, ginger, cardamom, turmeric and coriander.

== Serving ==
Pakoras are eaten as a snack or appetiser, often accompanied by chutney or raita. They are also offered with masala chai to guests at Indian wedding ceremonies.

== Regional names ==
A gram-flour fritter is known in Tamil Nadu and Sri Lanka as pakoda or bajji, in Gujarat as bhajia, in Maharashtra as bhaji, and in Andhra Pradesh/Telangana and Karnataka as bajji or pakodi. Pakodain Bengal (some parts) "Jhal pitha" may be interpreted in these states as deep-fried balls of finely chopped onions, green chilis, and spices mixed in gram flour. In Manipur, it is known as bora. In Bhojpuri region, it is known as bajka, chakka, tarua or pakauri.

== Gallery ==
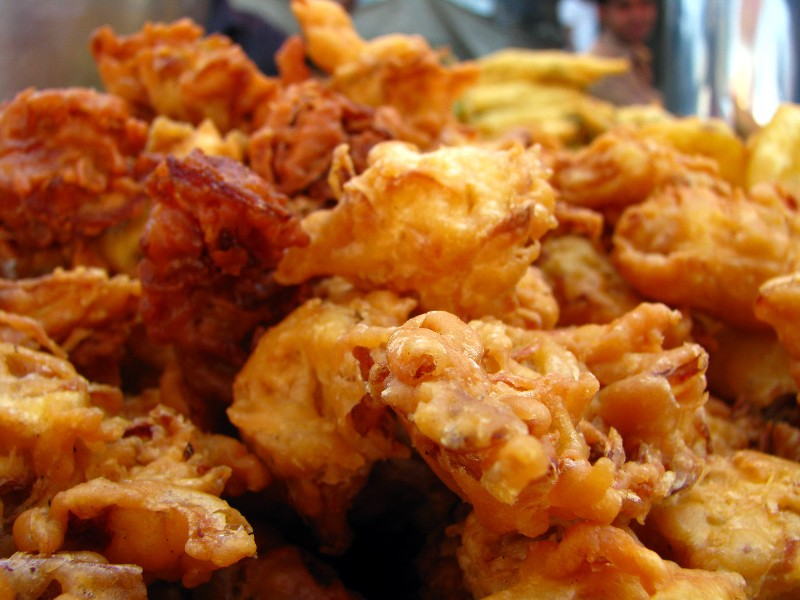
Pakoras being deep-fried in gram flour batter

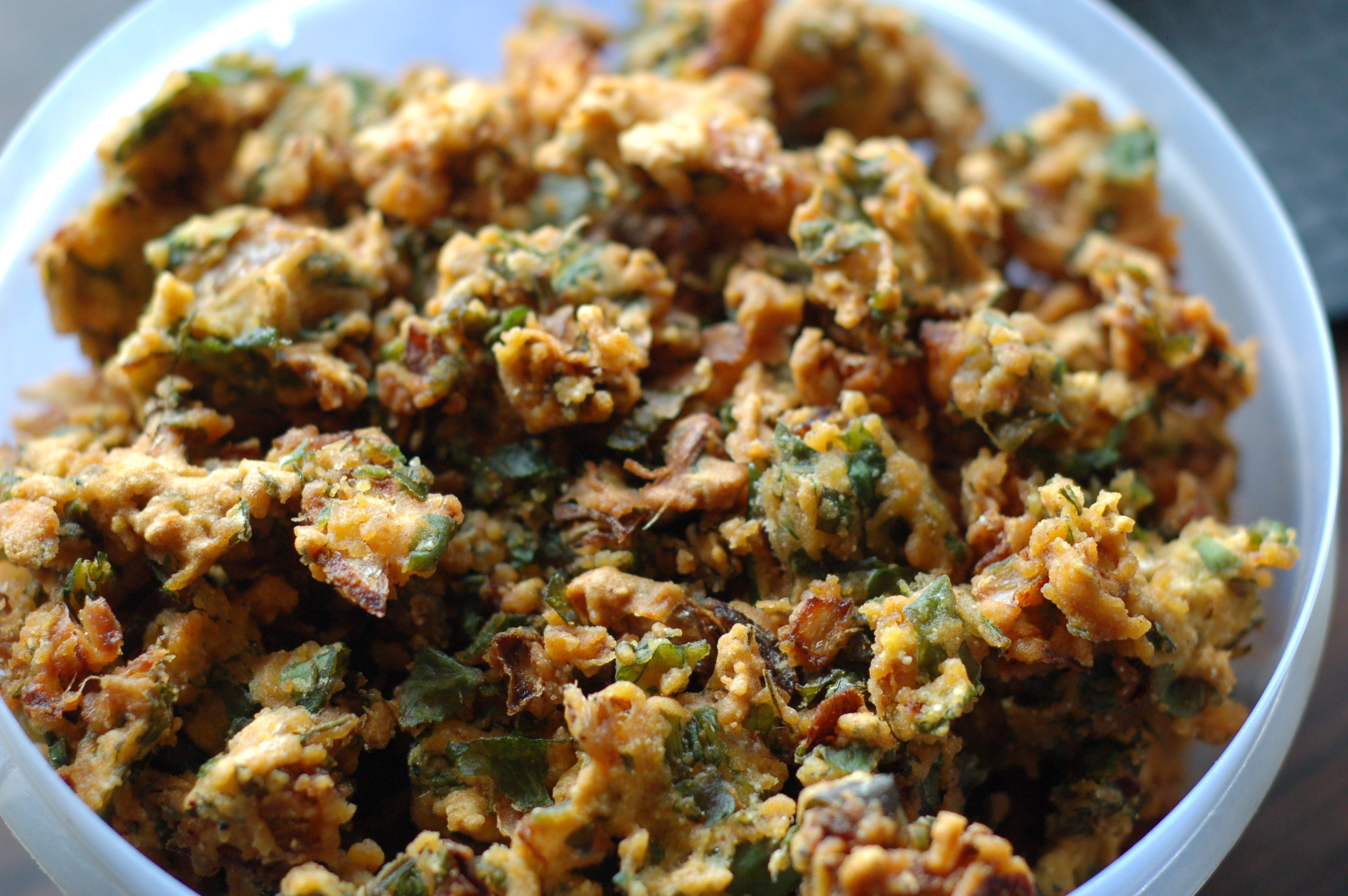
Onion and green leaf pakoras

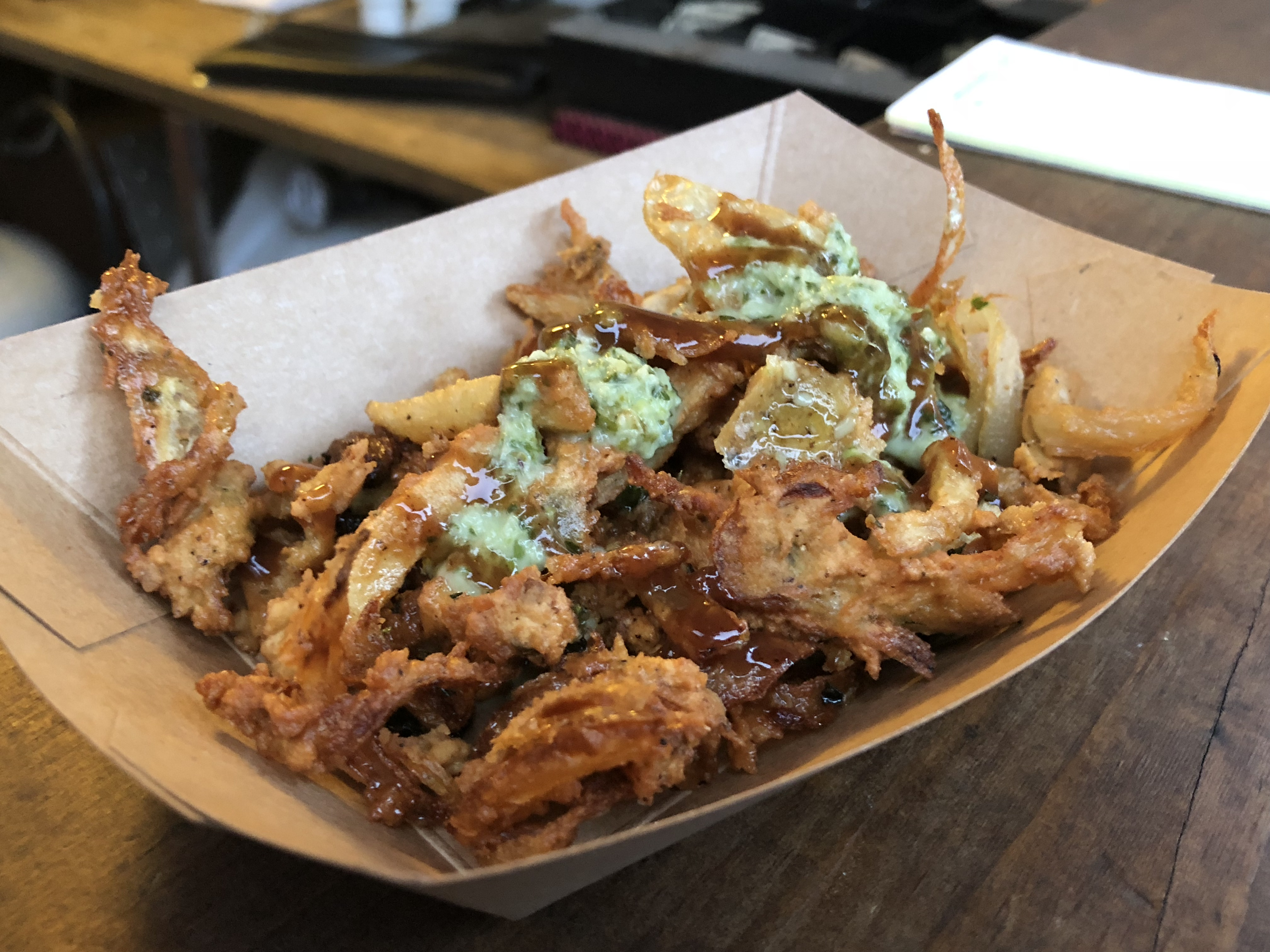
Onion pakoras served with mint chutney

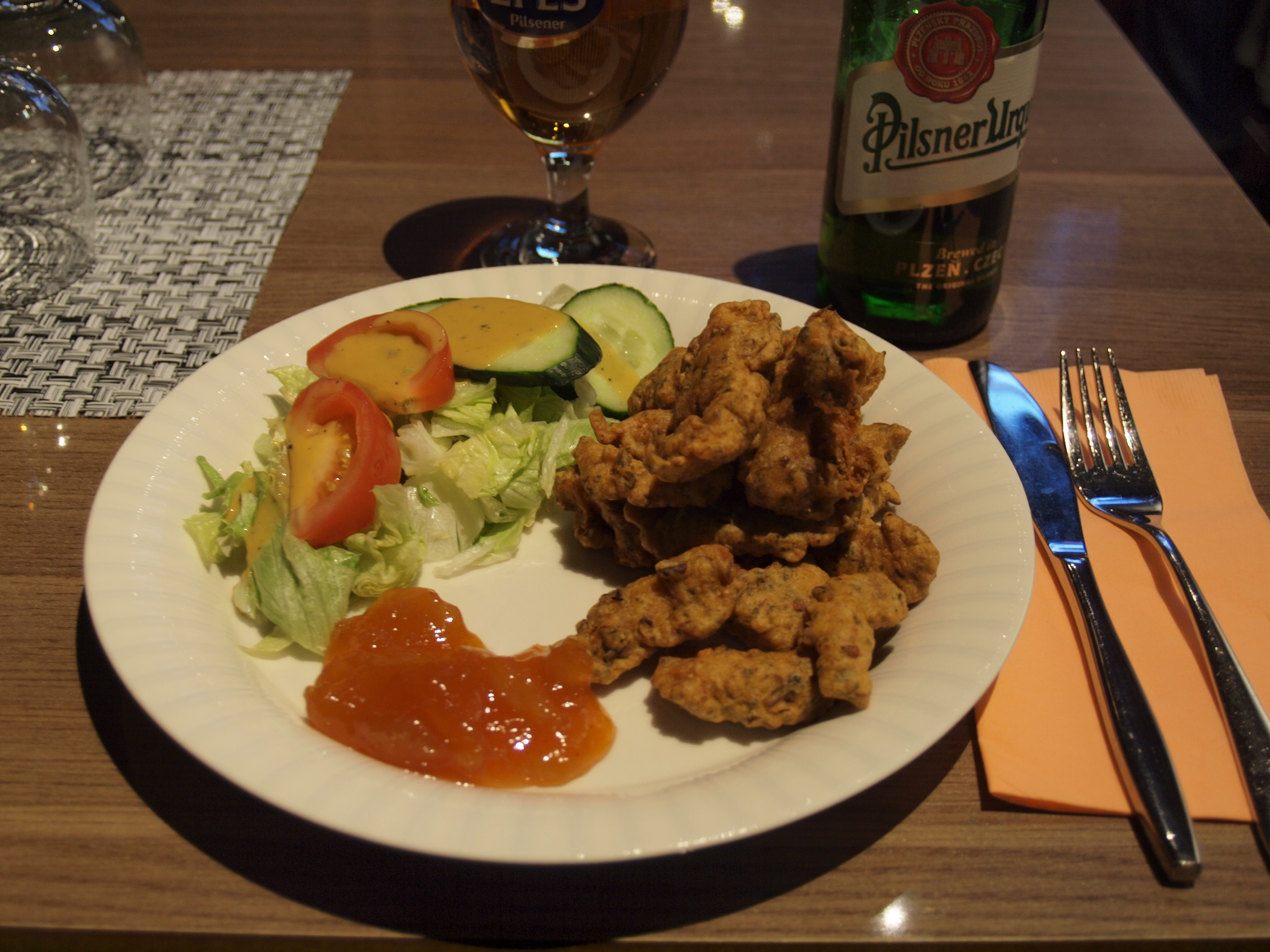
Chicken pakoras

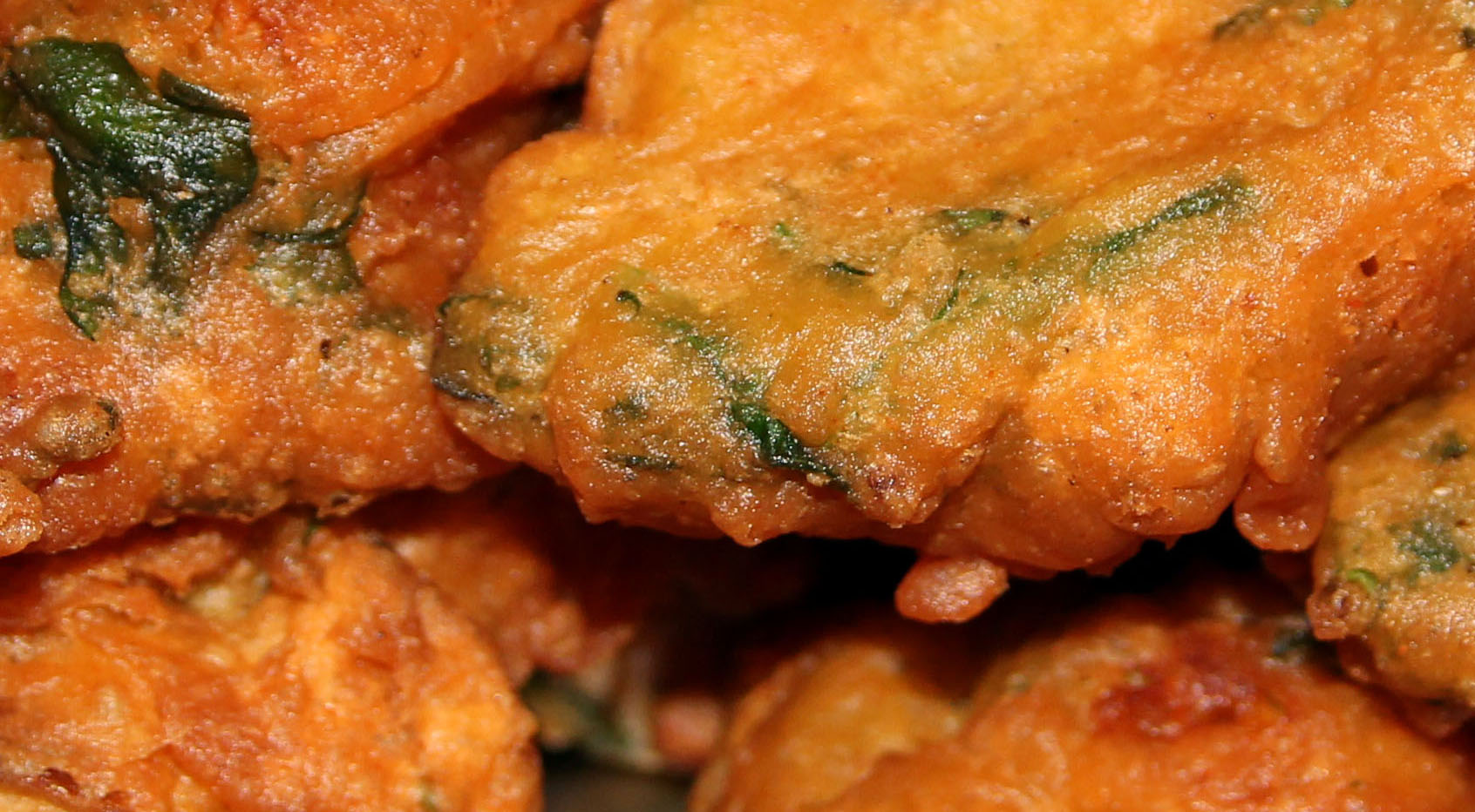
Close-up of spinach pakora

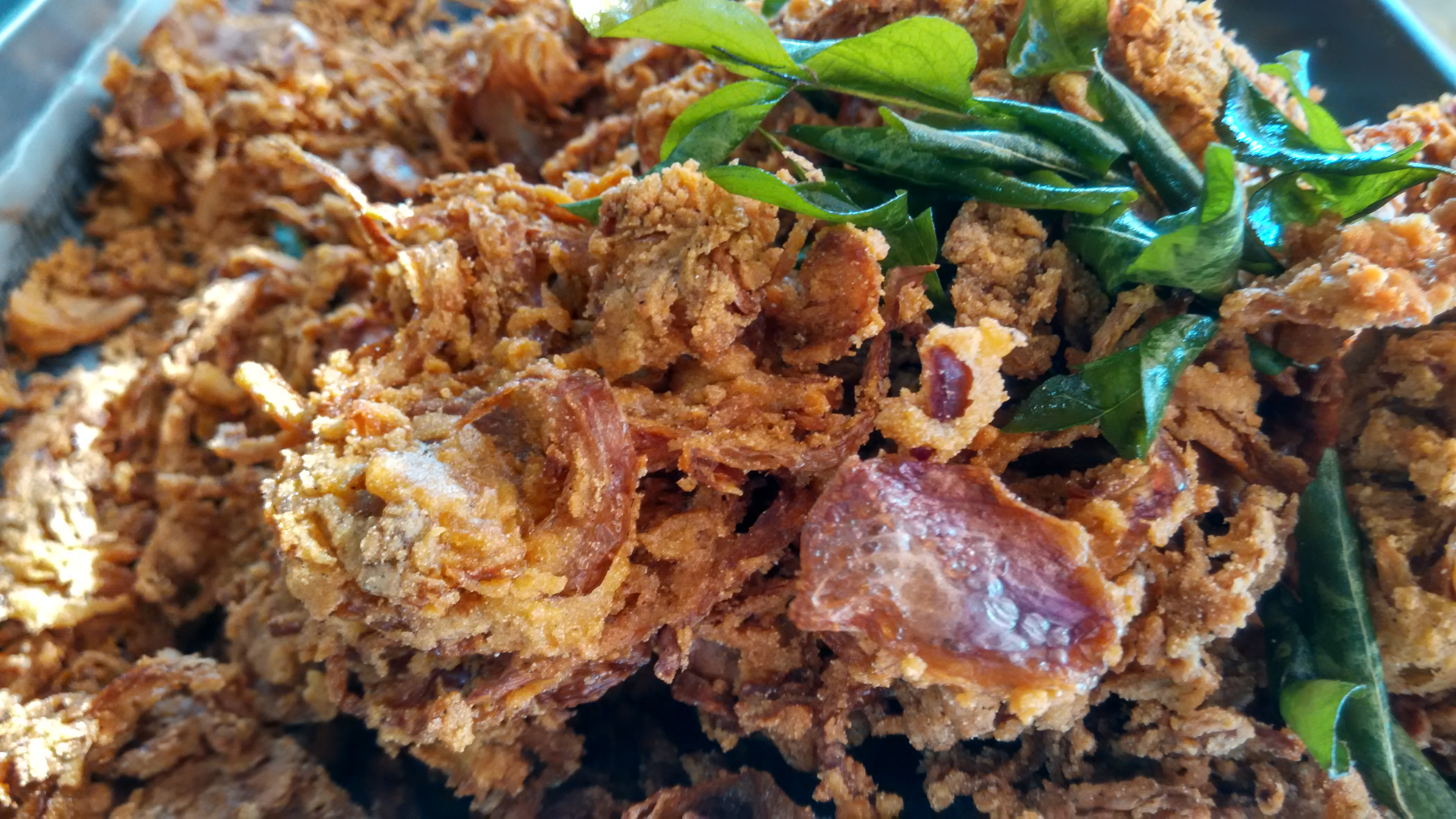
Onion pakora

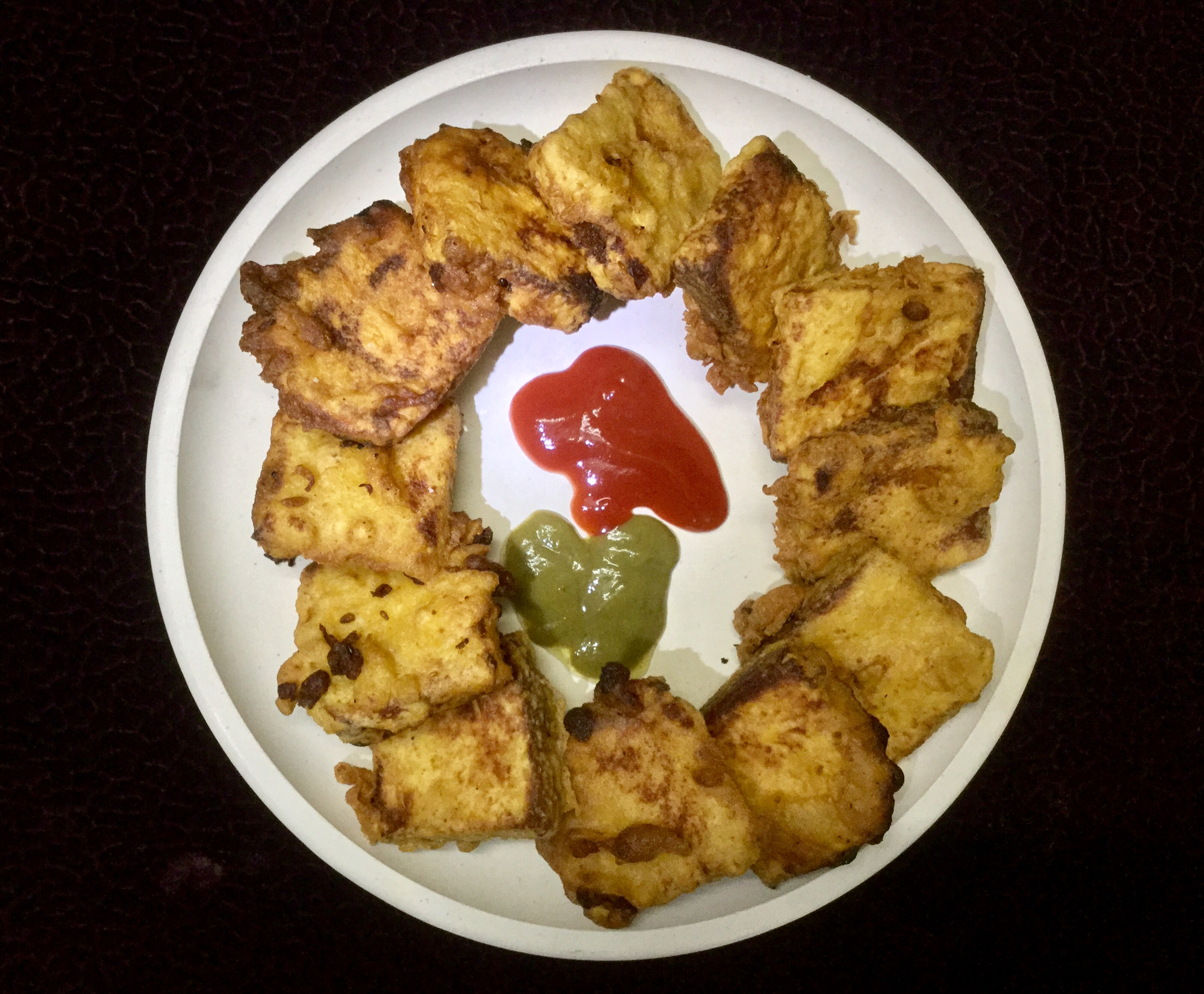
Bread pakora made by frying bread slices coated with gram flour

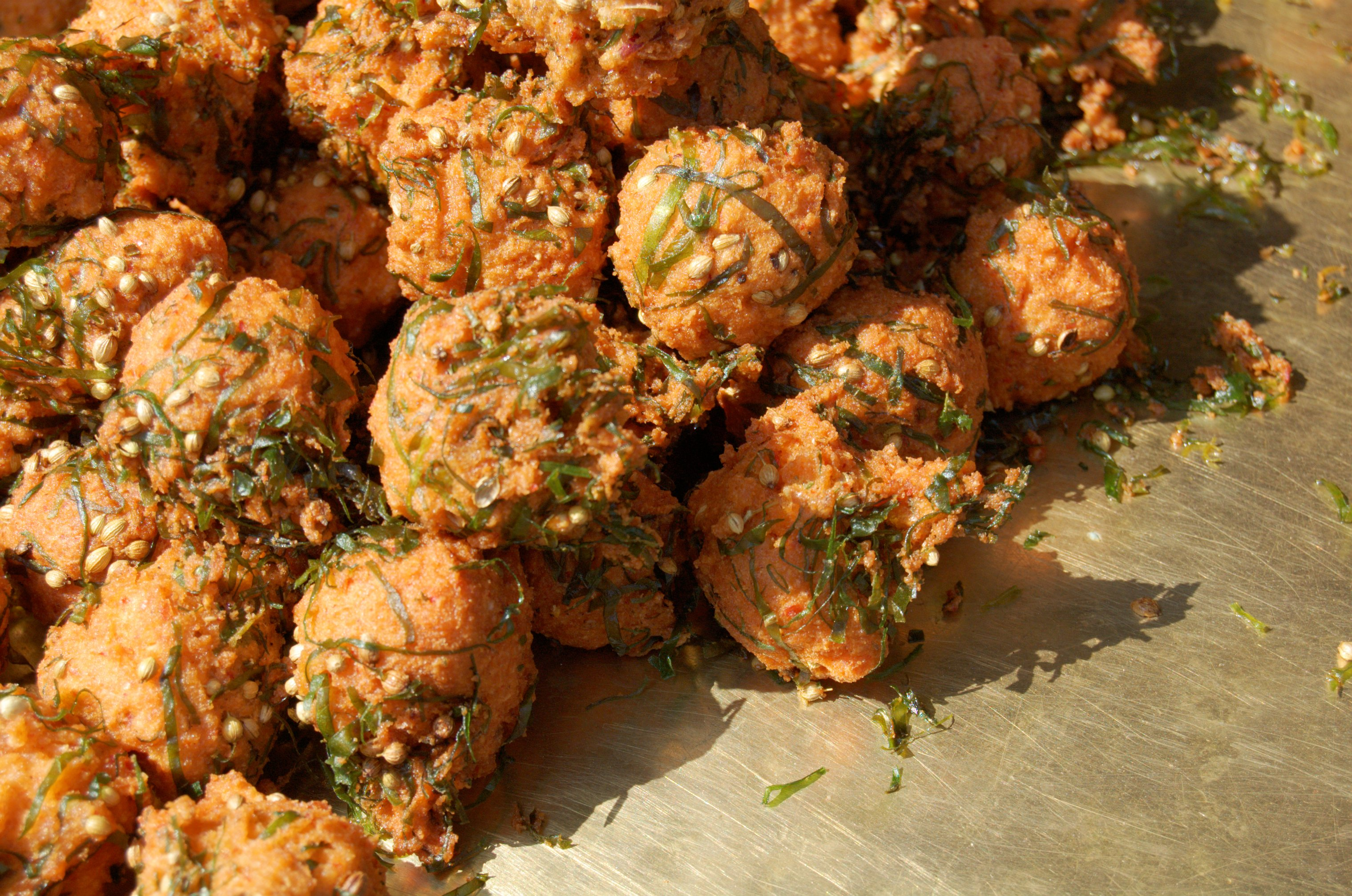
Pakoras sold in Jaipur

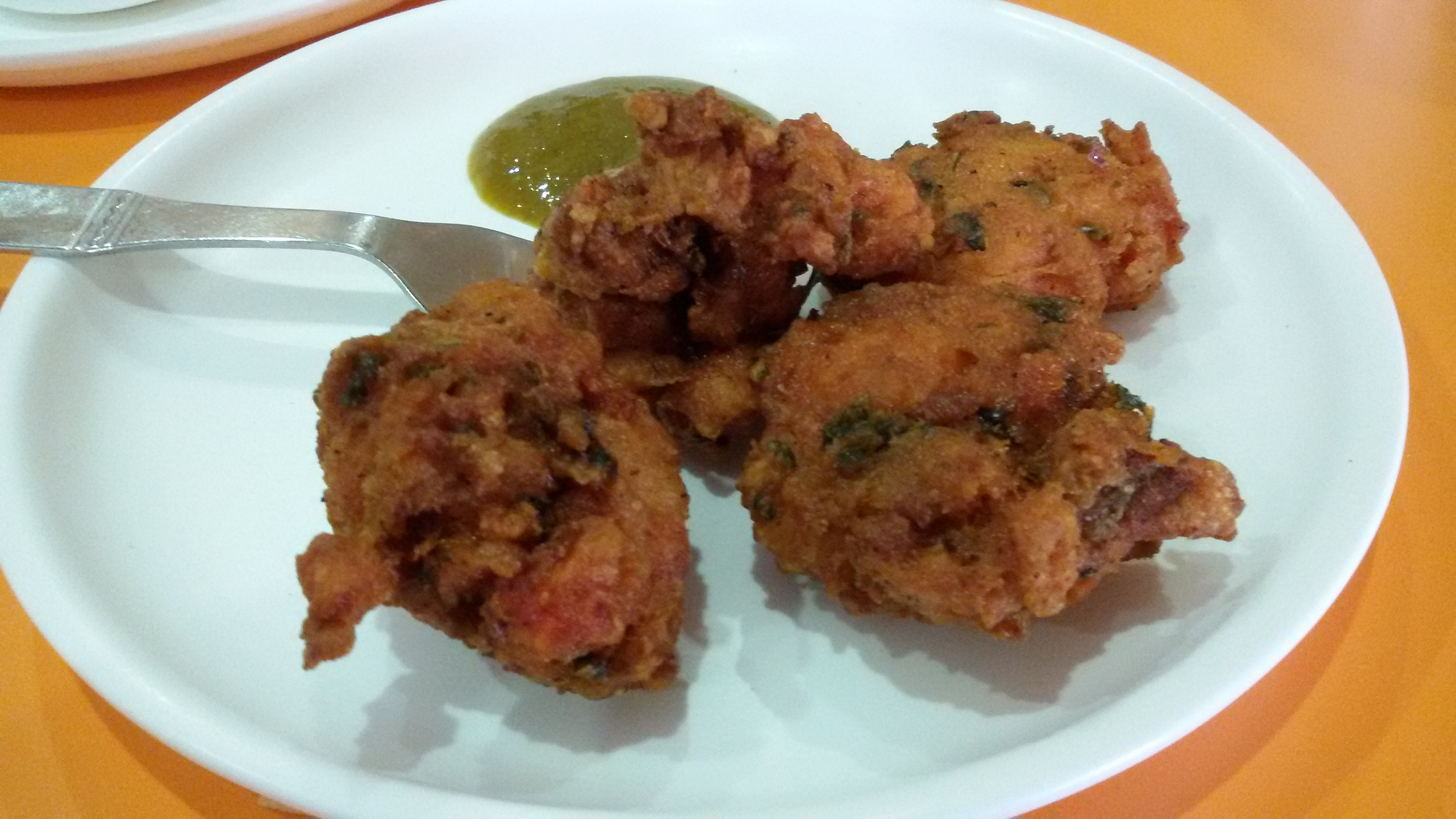
Another variety of chicken pakoras

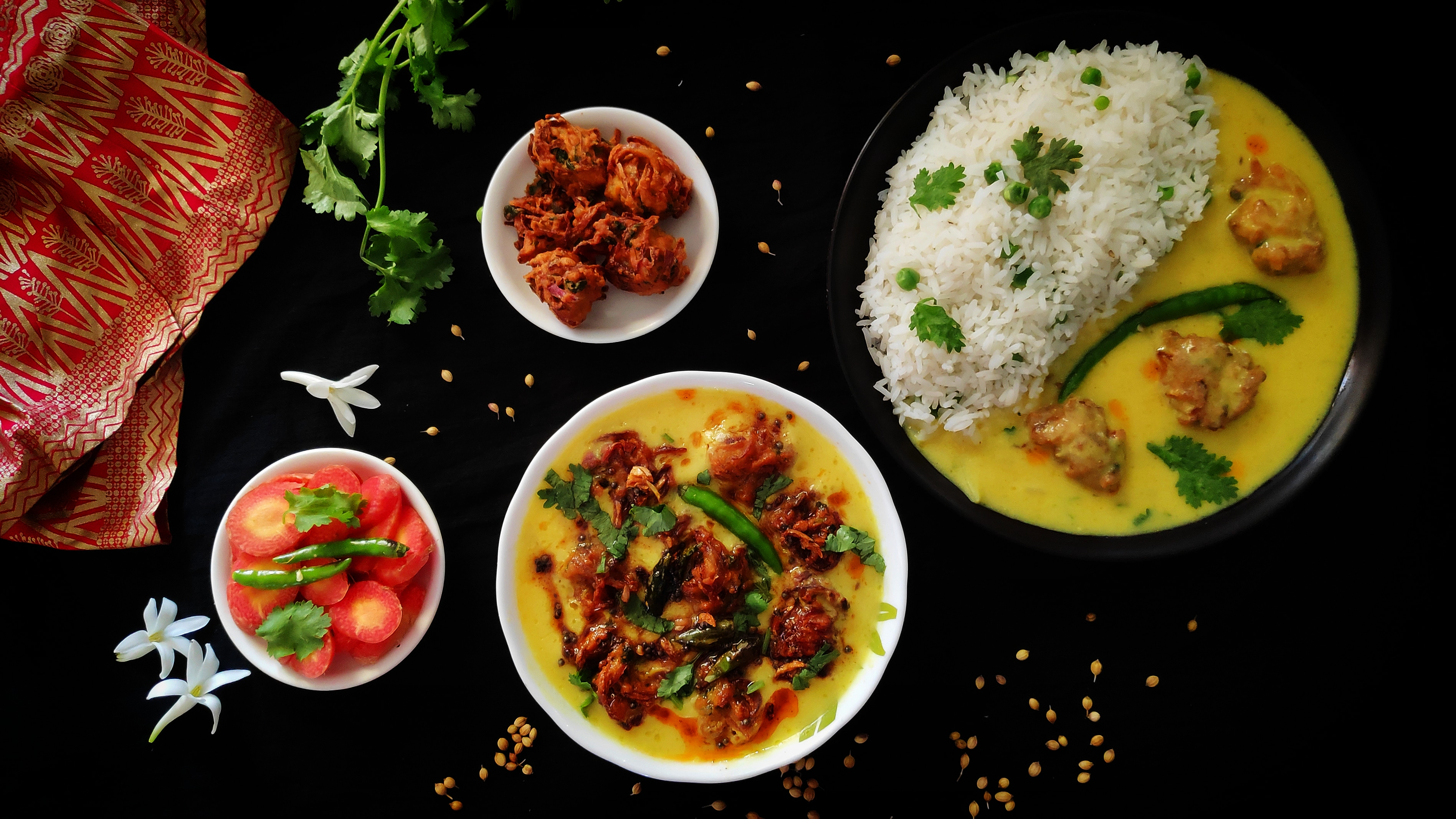
Pakoras used in Kadhi Pakora, a yogurt-based curry eaten with rice

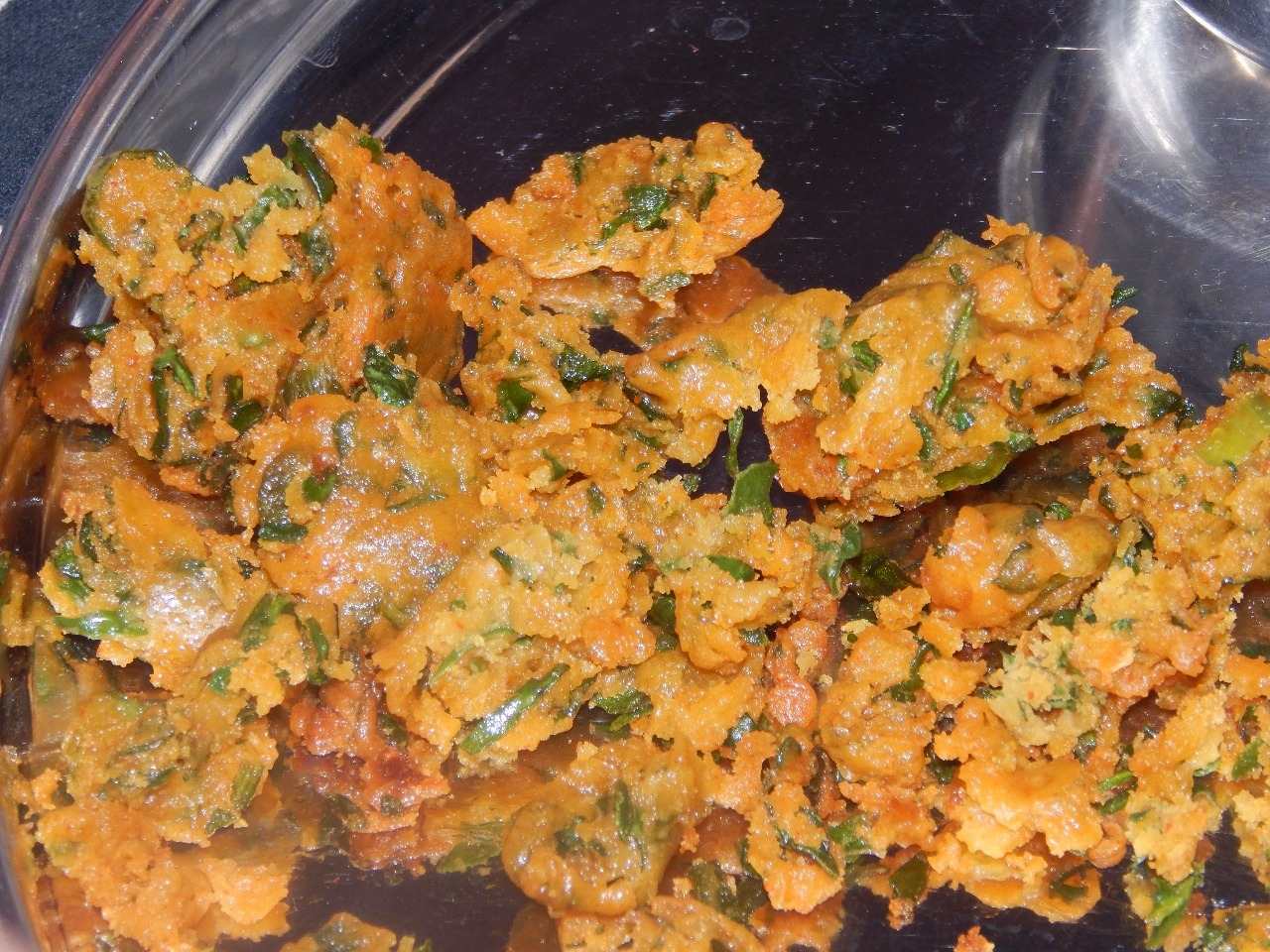
Spinach pakoras

Vazhakkai Bajji (Banana fritters) from South India

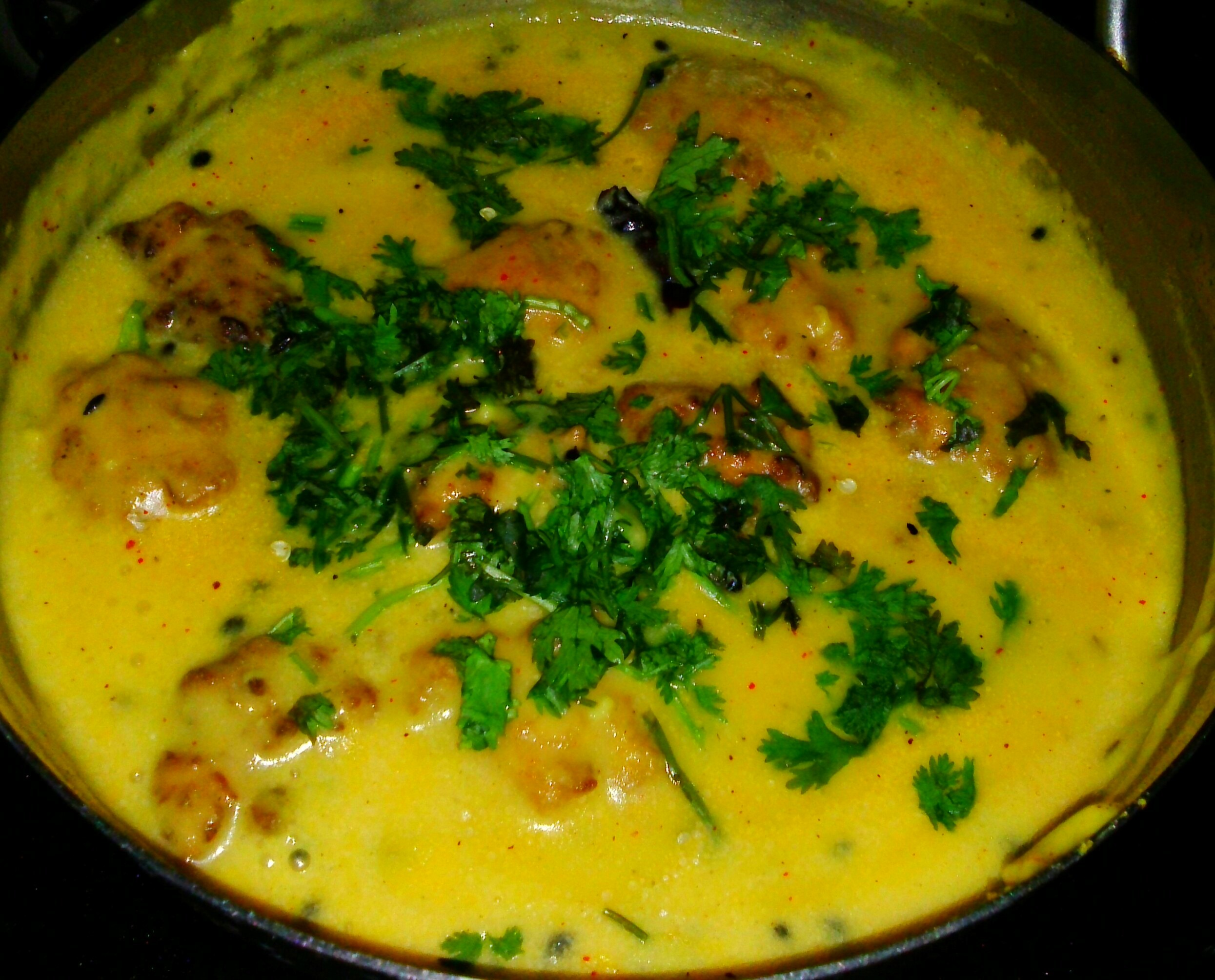
Kadhi Pakora : pakoras in a spiced yogurt gravy served with rice or roti

== See also ==
- List of deep fried foods
- List of Indian dishes
- Bakwan – Indonesian vegetable fritter
- Bhaji – Deep-fried fritters served as fast food in India, Pakistan and the Caribbean
- Bread pakora – Indian deep-fried snack
- Haggis pakora – Scottish snack food of haggis ingredients prepared as pakoras
- Pholourie – Fried, spiced dough balls
- Samosa – Deep-fried snack/ turnover
- Vada – Category of savoury fried snacks from India
