= Vada (food) =

Category of savoury fried snacks from India

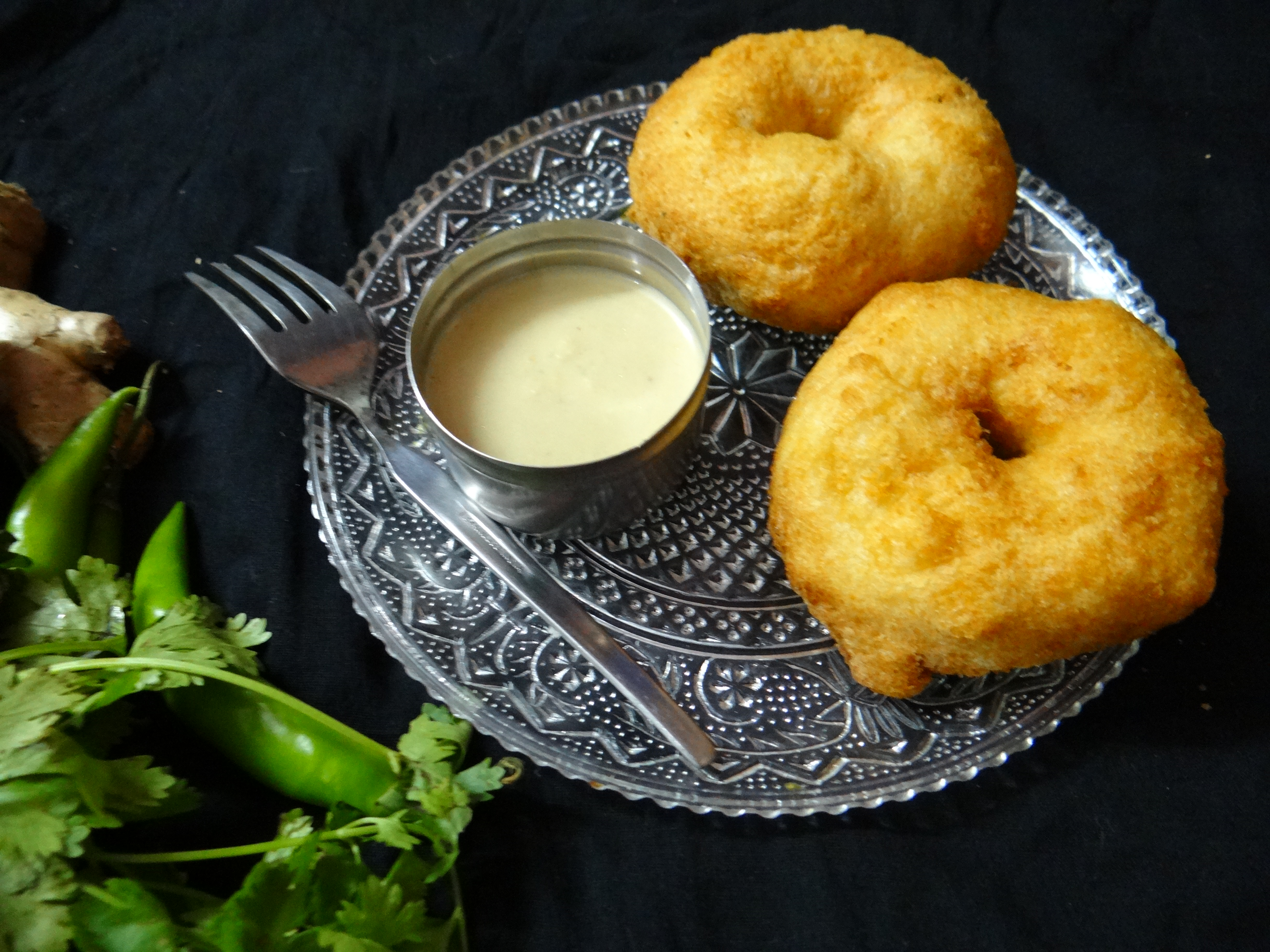
- Medu vadas served with coconut chutney
- Alternative names: wada, vade, vadai, bara
- Course: breakfast, snack
- Place of origin: India
- Region or state: India, Sri Lanka, Pakistan, Bangladesh, Singapore, Malaysia, Myanmar, Trinidad and Tobago, Guyana, Suriname, South Africa, Mauritius, Fiji
- Similar dishes: Burmese fritters

Vada (Note: Regional names include vadai, wada, bara, and bora. IPA: [ʋəɽaː]) is a category of savoury fried snacks native to India. Vadas can be described variously as fritters, cutlets, or dumplings. Vadas are sometimes stuffed with vegetables and traditionally served with chutneys and sambar.

In North India and Pakistan, bhalla is a similar food. It is sold in chaat shops and kiosks; green bean paste is added with spices, which is then deep-fried to make croquettes. They are then garnished with dahi (yogurt), saunth chutney (dried ginger and tamarind sauce) and spices. Bhalla is usually served cold, unlike the aloo tikki.

The various types of vadas are made from different ingredients, ranging from legumes (such as medu vada of South India) to potatoes (such as batata vada of Maharashtra). They are often served as a breakfast item or a snack, and also used in other food preparations (such as dahi vada, vada pav, and doubles).

== History ==
According to K. T. Achaya, Vadai (Vada) finds mention in Sangam literature during 100 BCE – 300 CE. A type of vada is mentioned as "vataka" in Manasollasa, a 12th-century Sanskrit encyclopedia compiled by Someshvara III, who ruled from present-day Karnataka. In this recipe, mung beans are soaked, de-skinned, and ground to a paste. The paste is shaped into balls and deep-fried. Early literature from the present-day states of Bihar and Uttar Pradesh also mentions bara (vada) and mungaura (a vada made from mung).

Many immigrants from Uttar Pradesh and Bihar migrated to places such as Trinidad and Tobago, Guyana, Suriname, South Africa, Mauritius, and Fiji in the mid-19th century to the early 20th century as indentured laborers. Bara became an important part of the Indian cuisine in these countries. In Trinidad and Tobago, bara became a component of one of their most famous street foods, called doubles. Doubles is served with two baras filled with curried channa and topped with various chutneys or achars. Many South Indians also migrated to these countries and brought their version of vada. For example, in Guyana it is known as Madrasi bara or waday to distinguish it from the North Indian bara.

== Preparation ==
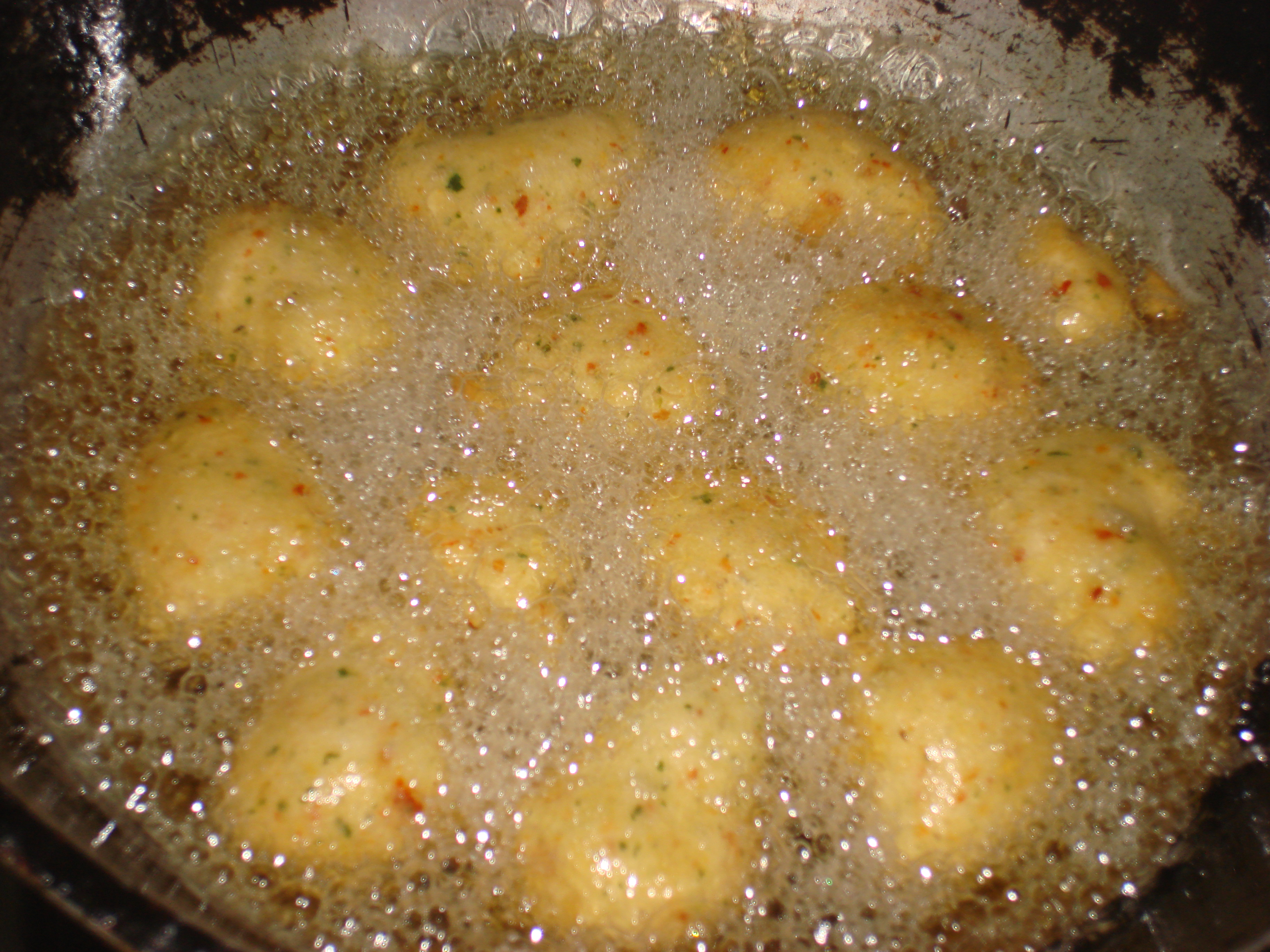
Medu vada being deep-fried in oil

Vada may be made from legumes, sago or potatoes. Commonly used legumes include pigeon pea, chickpea, black gram and green gram. Vegetables and other ingredients are added to improve taste and nutritive value.

For legume-based vadas, the legumes (dal) are soaked with water, and then ground to a batter. The batter is then seasoned with other ingredients, such as cumin seeds, onion, curry leaves (sometimes previously sauteed), salt, chillies or black pepper grains. Often ginger and baking soda are added to the seasoning in shops to increase the fluffy texture and improve fermentation for large batches. The mixture is then shaped and deep-fried, resulting in vadas with a crispy skin and fluffy centre. The preparation of kalmi vadas involves cutting the resulting product into pieces and re-frying them.

== Varieties ==
Medu vada
Nutritional value per 2 pieces (58 gm)
- Energy: 795 kJ (190 kcal)
- Carbohydrates: 18
- Sugars: 0
- Dietary fiber: 5 g
- Fat: 11 g
- Saturated: 4 g
- Protein: 4 g
Vitamins and minerals
| Minerals | Quantity %DV^{†} |
| Sodium | 13% 306 mg |
- ^{†}Percentages estimated using US recommendations for adults.

The various types of vadas include:

- Medu vada, made with urad dal (black gram) flour. This vada is shaped like a doughnut with a hole in the middle. It is the most common vada type throughout South India and the most recognisable throughout India. It is also known as ulundhu vadai, uddina vade, minapa vada (Telugu) and uzhunnu vada.
- Masala vada, made with toor dal (whole lentils) and shaped roughly like a disk. It is also referred to as aamai vadai in Tamil due to its resemblance to a tortoise. Other names include masala vade (Kannada) and parippu vada (Malayalam). Paruppu vada is made with yellow split peas, green chillies, whole red chillies, onions and salt.
- Maddur vade, an onion vada unique to the state of Karnataka. It is especially well known in the Maddur town of Karnataka and has a different taste from any other vada types. It is typically larger than other vada types and is flat, crispy (to the point of breaking when flexed), and without a hole in the middle. It started as a snack at the Maddur railway station on the Bengaluru–Mysuru railway line. Maddur was the halfway mark on this line and most trains would stop there with passengers buying this snack.
- Ambode, made from split chickpeas without the seed coat, i.e. kadale bele in Kannada.
- Mosaru vade, made by cooking a vada normally, and then serving the vada in a mix of dahi (yogurt) and spices.
- Eerulli bajji, also known as uli vada (Malayalam): made with onion. It is roughly round-shaped, and may or may not have a hole in the middle.
- Rava vada, made of semolina.
- Bonda, made with potatoes, garlic and spices coated with lentil paste and fried. In some regions, a bonda is considered a distinct snack food, and is not held to be a type of vada.
- Sabudana vada is another variety of vada common in Maharashtra, made from pearl sago.
- Thavala vada, a vada made with different types of lentils.
- Keerai vada (spinach vada) is made with spinach-type leaf vegetables along with lentils.
- Batata vada (potato vada). Often served in the form of vada pav, with a bun (known as a pav) and chutney; common street food in Maharashtra, especially in Mumbai.
- Keema vada, a vada made from minced meat, typically smaller and more crisp than other vada types with no hole in the middle.
- Vada curry or vada sambhar is a gravy dish that is made with prepared vadas blended with a vegetables in a curry or a gravy format.
- Bhajani cha vada: a vada made from a flour made from bajri, jowar, wheat, rice, channa dal, cumin, and coriander seeds; a speciality of Maharashtra.
- Doubles: a snack made with two baras filled with curry channa (curried chickpeas) and various chutneys.
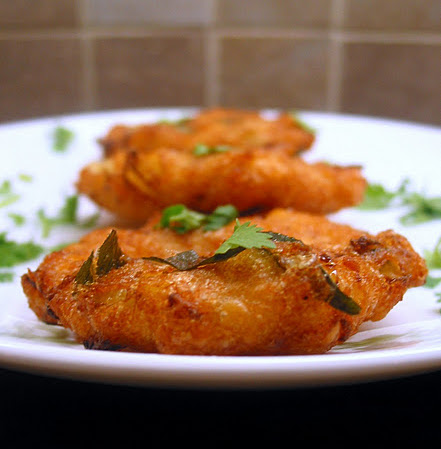
Palak vada

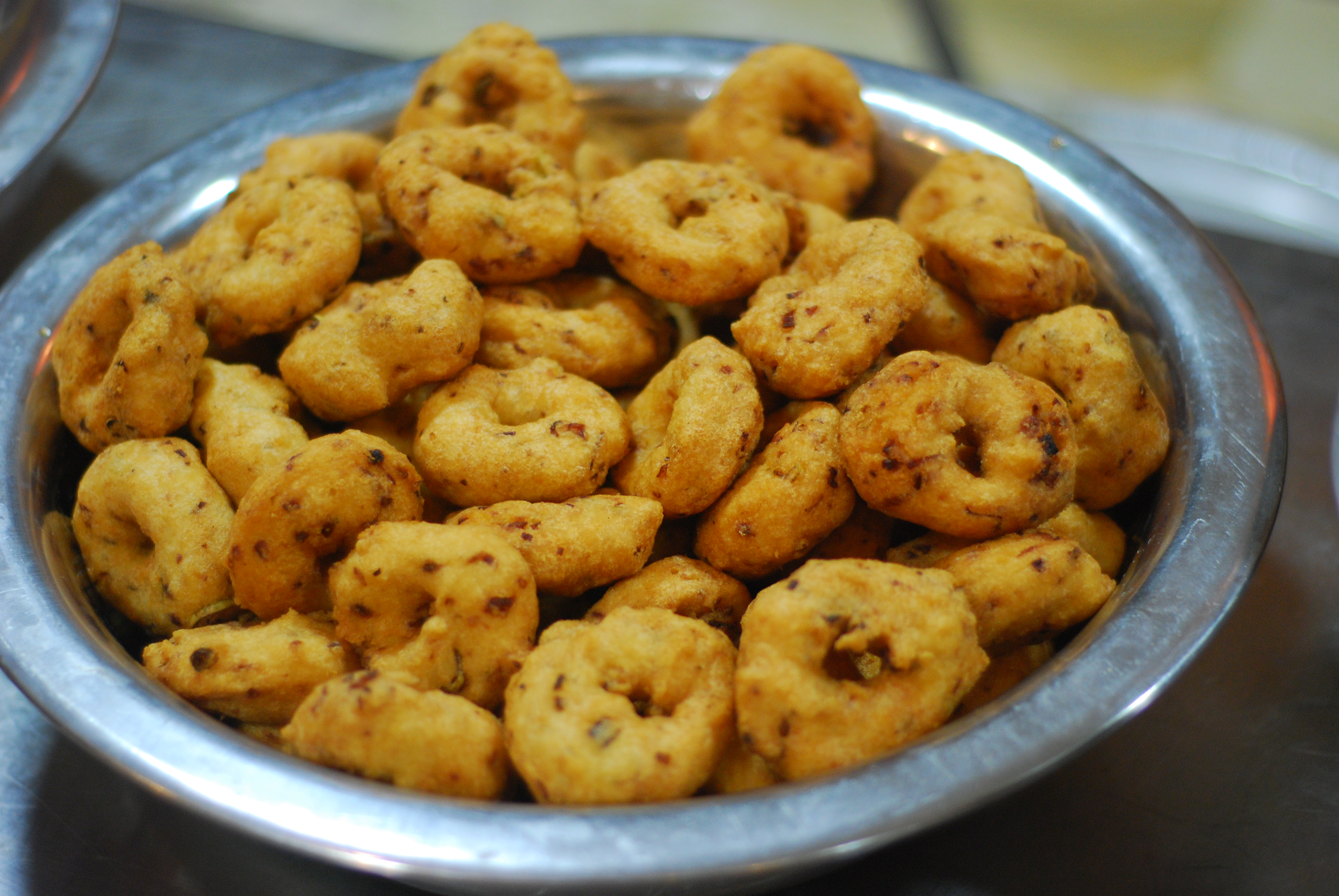
Medu vada or uddina vada

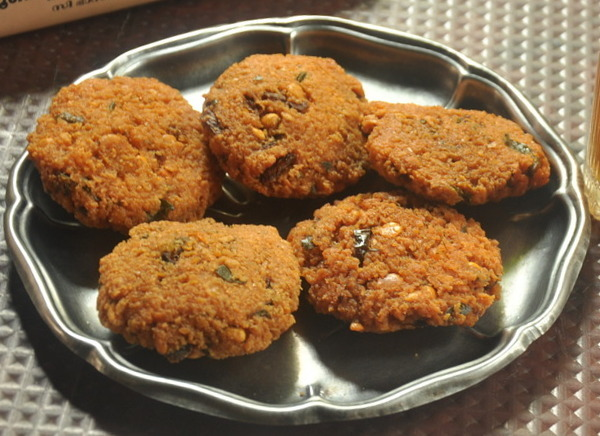
Masala vada or paruppu bada or 'aamai' tortoise vadai

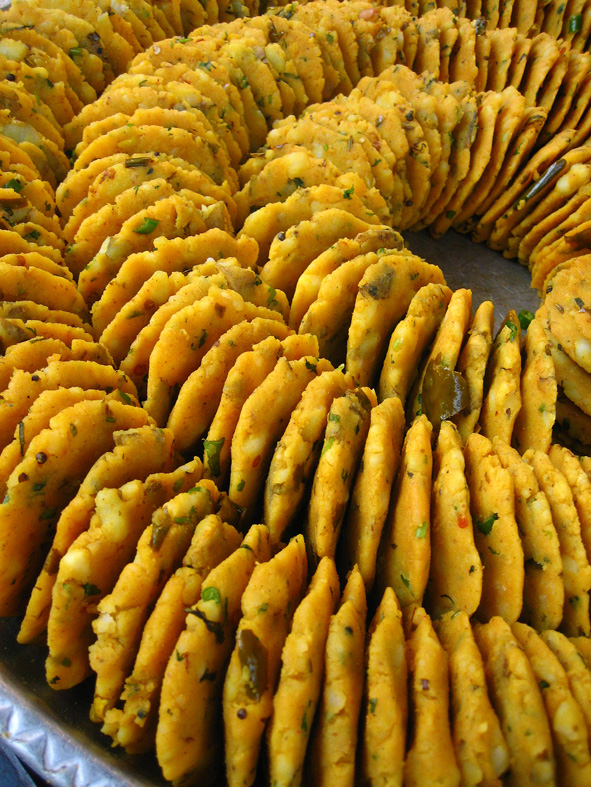
Batata vada

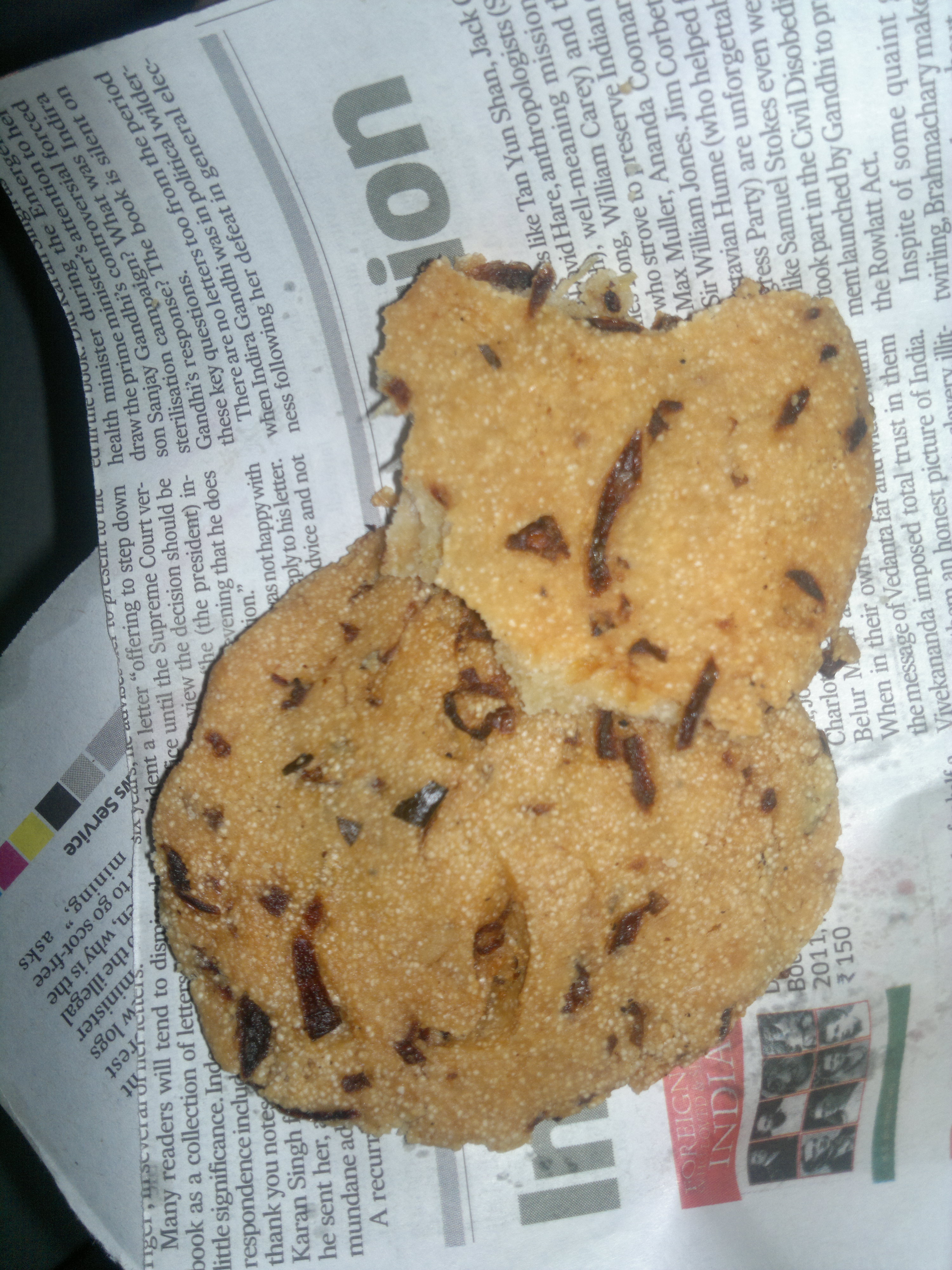
Maddur vada

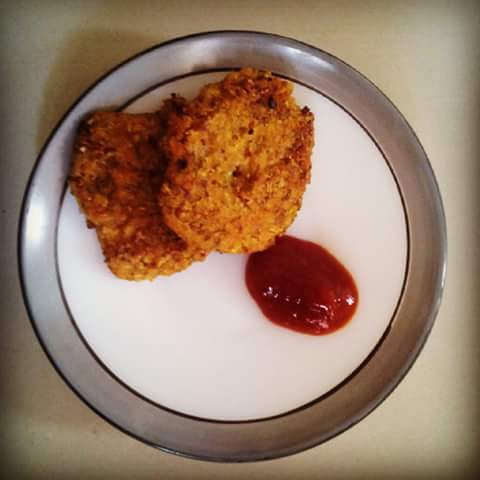
Neem flower vada

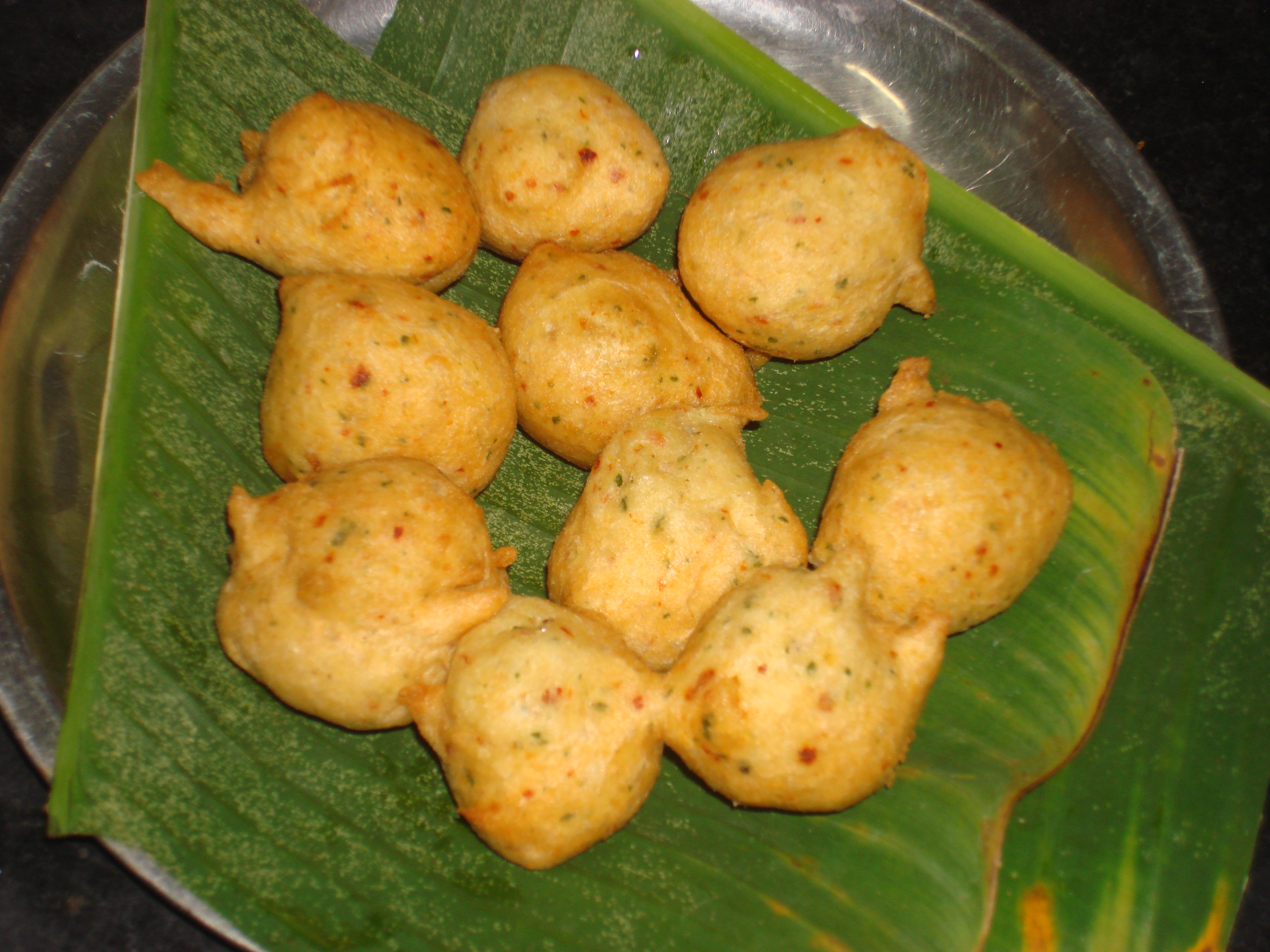
Ulundu vada

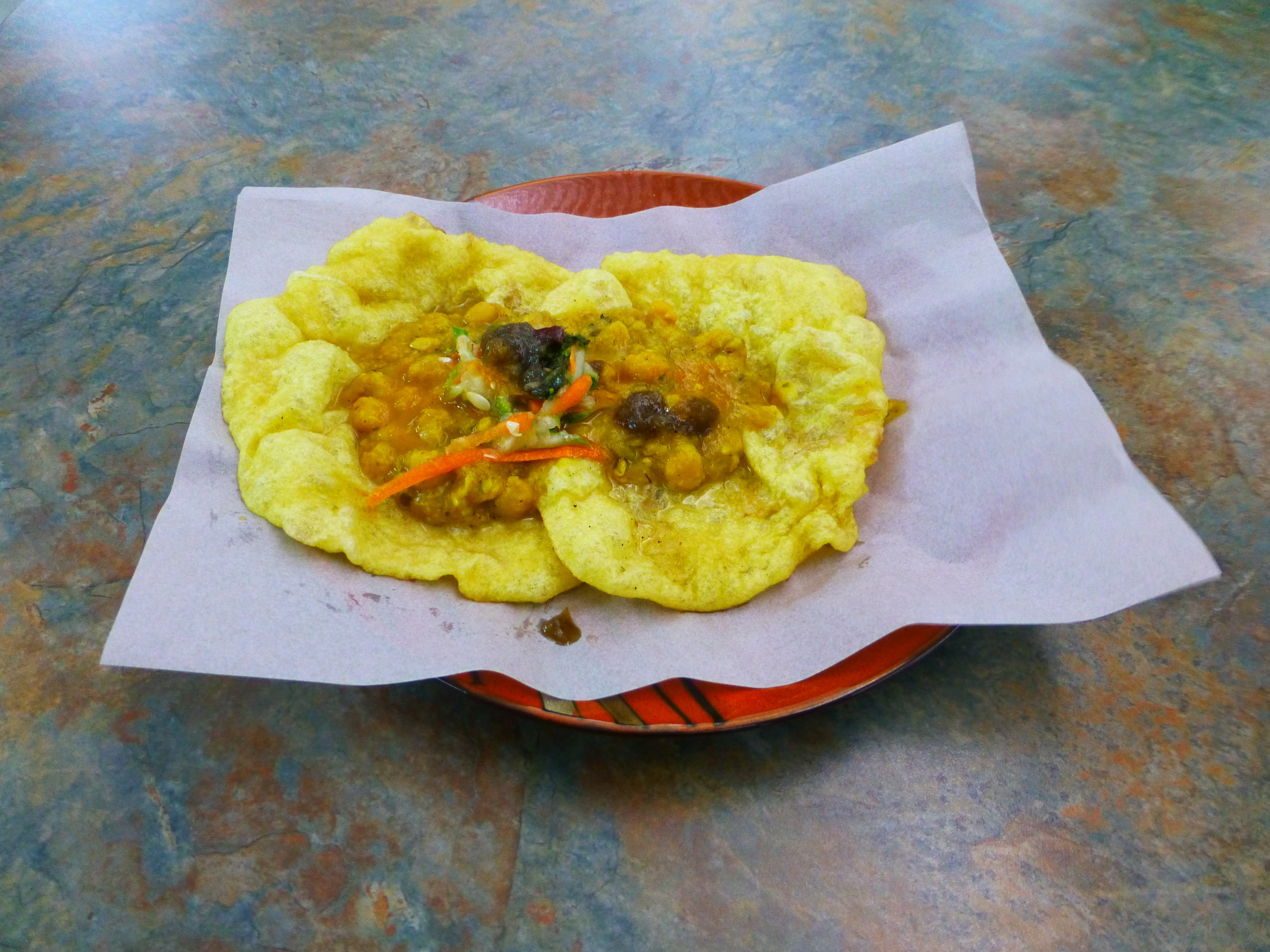
A Trinidadian doubles that consist of two baras filled with curried channa

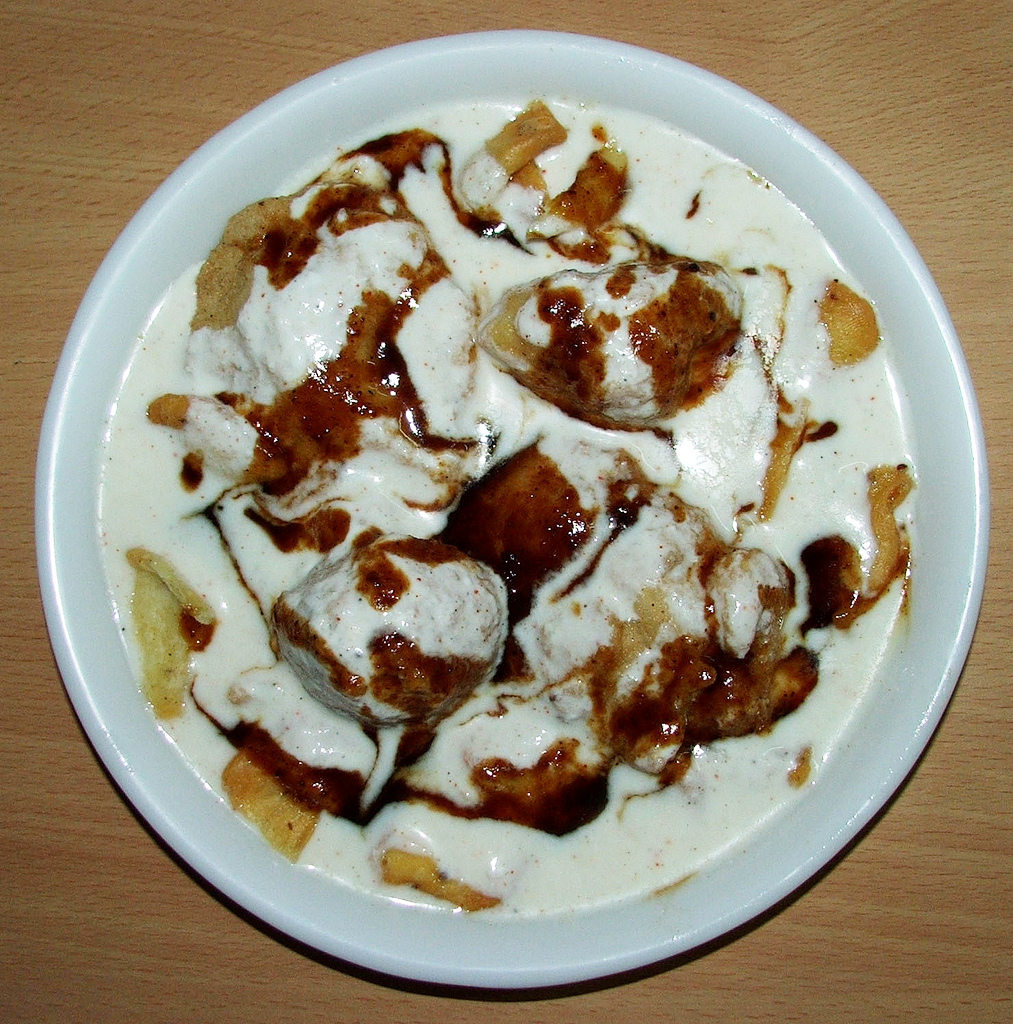
Bhalla papri chaat in dahi (yogurt) with saunth chutney

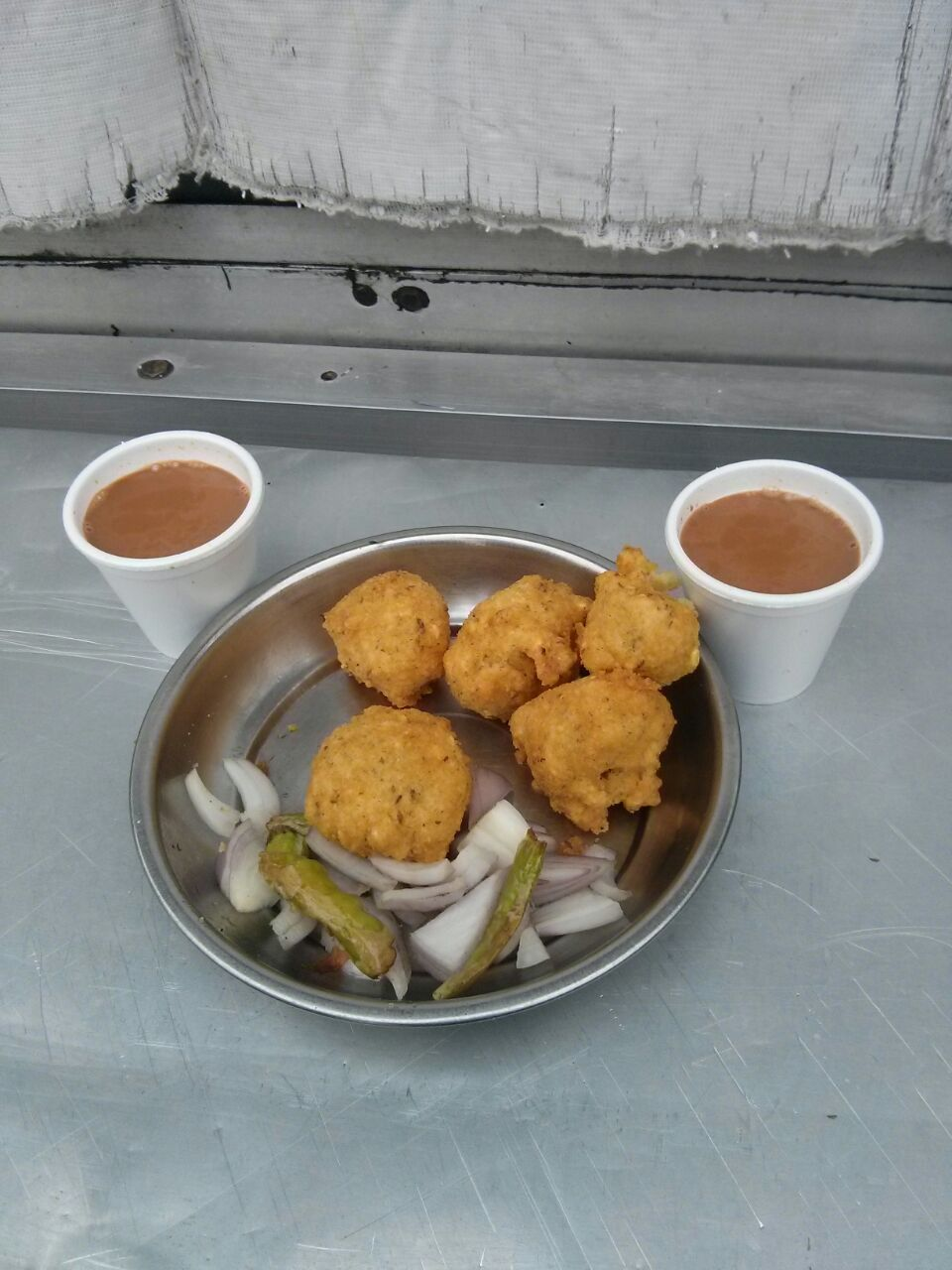
Dadvada

== See also ==
- Akara
- Bagel
- Boortsog
- Burmese fritters, a similar class of fritters in Myanmar
- Falafel
- Fried dough foods
- Hushpuppy, a similar dish of the Southern United States
- Korokke
- List of doughnut varieties
