= Fruit preserves =

Preparations of fruits, sugar, and sometimes acid

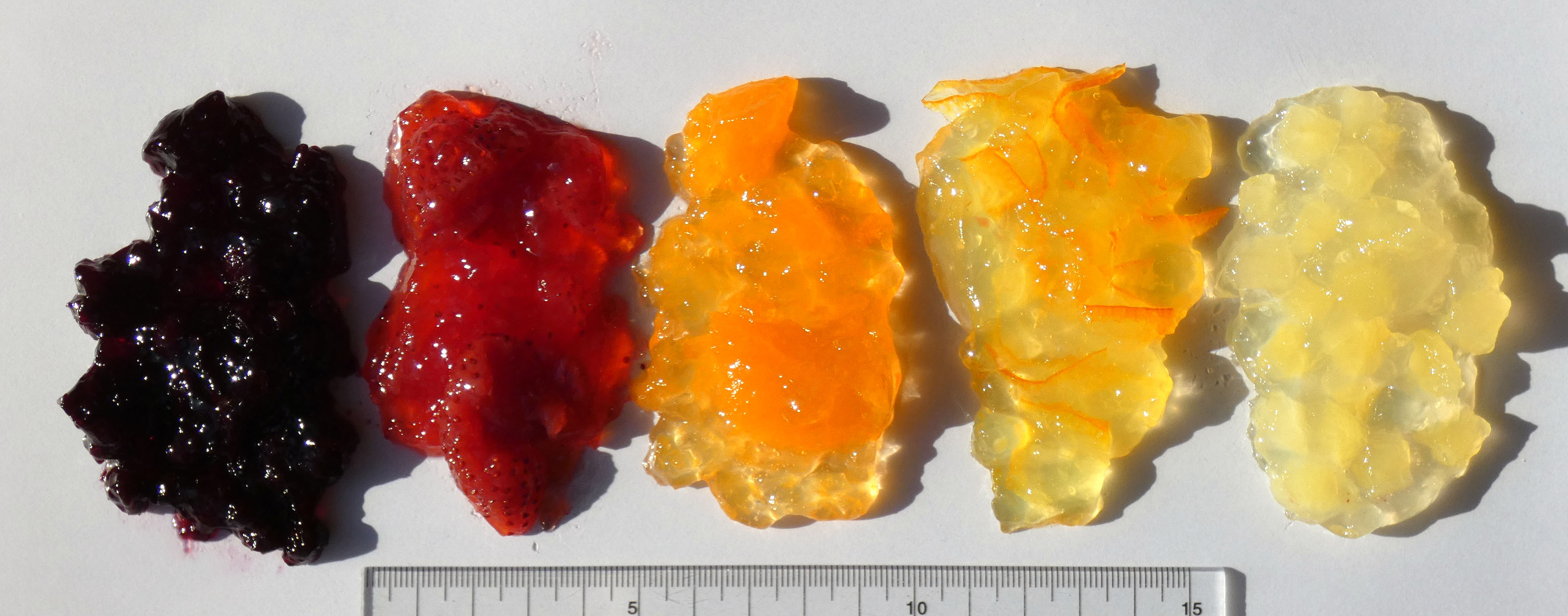
- Blueberry, strawberry, apricot, orange, and apple preserves
- Type: Spread, condiment
- Main ingredients: Fruits or vegetables; sugar, honey or pectin

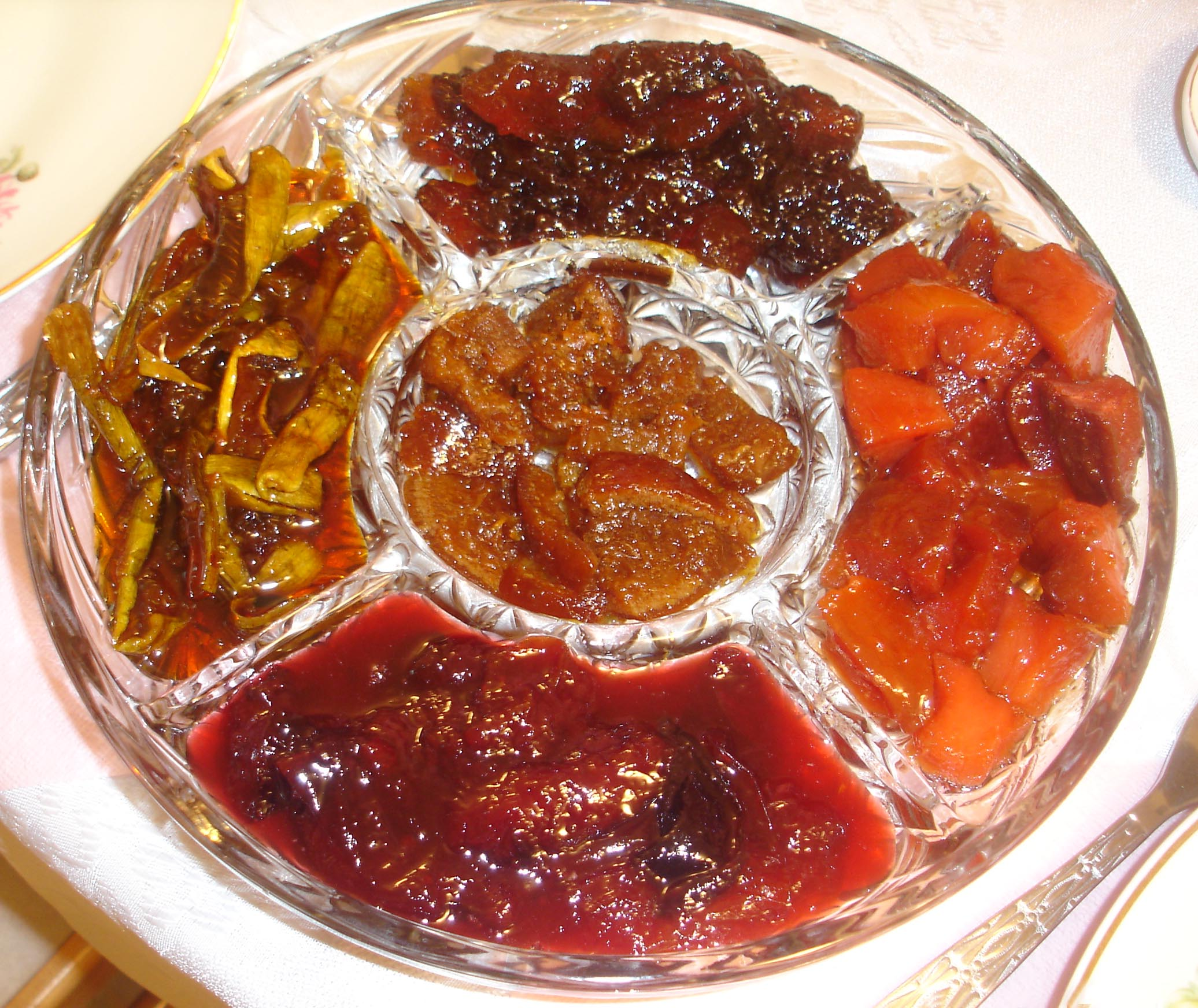
Five varieties of fruit preserves (clockwise from top): apple, quince, plum, squash, orange (in the center)

Fruit preserves are preparations of fruits whose main preserving agent is sugar and sometimes acid, often stored in glass jars and used as a condiment or spread.

There are many varieties of fruit preserves globally, distinguished by the method of preparation, type of fruit used, and its place in a meal. Sweet fruit preserves such as jams, jellies, and marmalades are often eaten at breakfast with bread or as an ingredient of a pastry or dessert, whereas more savory and acidic preserves made from "vegetable fruits" such as tomato, squash or zucchini, are eaten alongside savory foods such as cheese, cold meats, and curries.

== Techniques ==
There are several techniques of making jam, with or without added water. One factor depends on the natural pectin content of the ingredients. When making jam with low-pectin fruits like strawberries, high-pectin fruit like orange can be added, or additional pectin in the form of pectin powder, citric acid or citrus peels. Often the fruit will be heated gently in a pan to release its juices (and pectin), sometimes with a little added water, before the sugar is added. Another method is to macerate the fruits in sugar overnight and cook this down to a syrup.

== Regional terminology ==
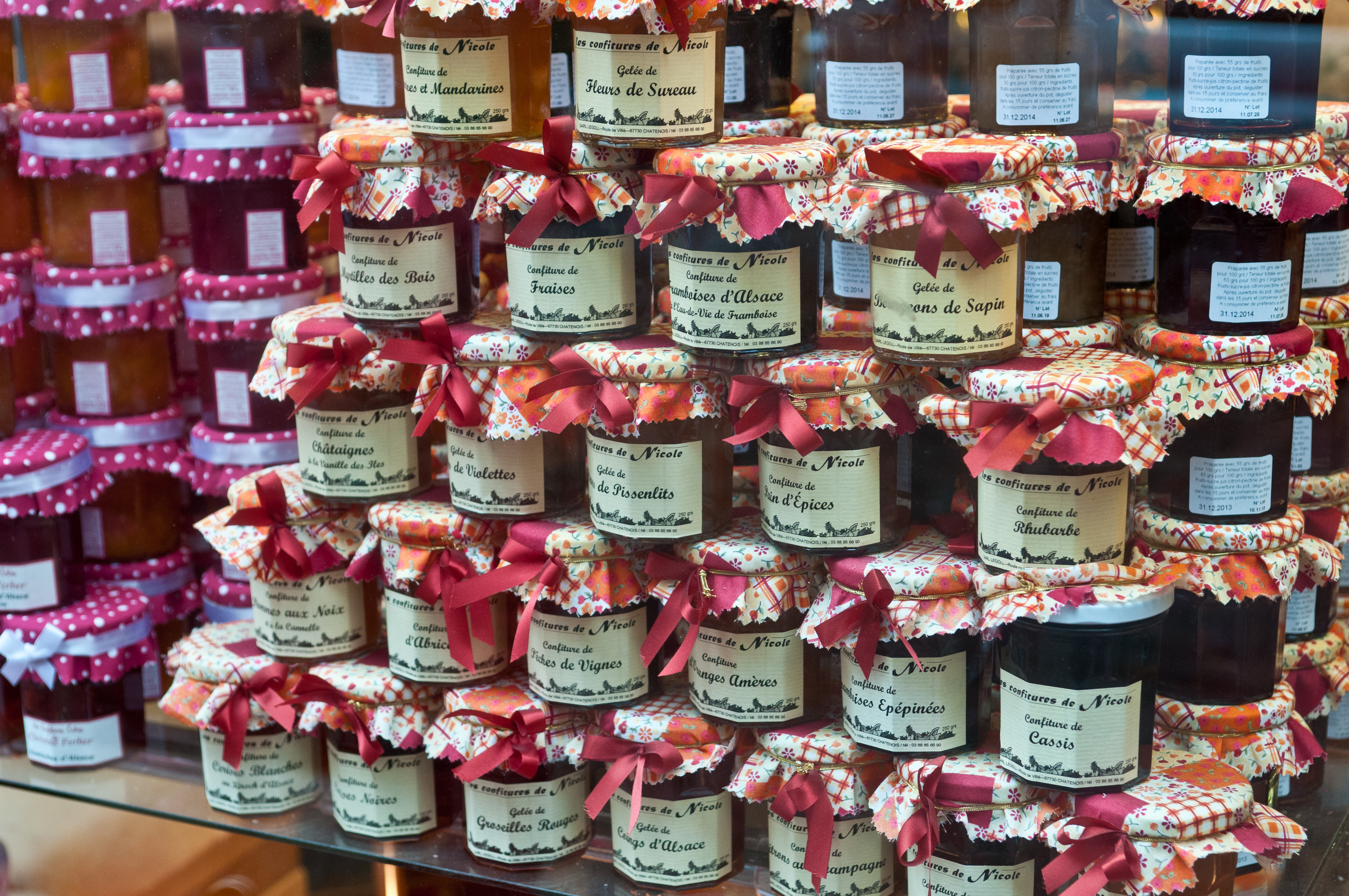
Jars of confiture and gelée for sale in Colmar, France

The term preserves is usually interchangeable with jams even though preserves contain chunks or pieces of the fruit whereas jams in some regions do not. Closely related names include: chutney, confit, conserve, fruit butter, fruit curd, fruit spread, jelly, cheese, leather and marmalade.

Some cookbooks define preserves as cooked and gelled whole fruit (or vegetable), which includes a significant portion of the fruit. In the English-speaking world, the two terms are more strictly differentiated and, when this is not the case, the more usual generic term is 'jam'.

The singular preserve or conserve is used as a collective noun for high fruit content jam, often for marketing purposes. Additionally, the name of the type of fruit preserves will also vary depending on the regional variant of English being used.

== Variations ==
=== Cheong ===
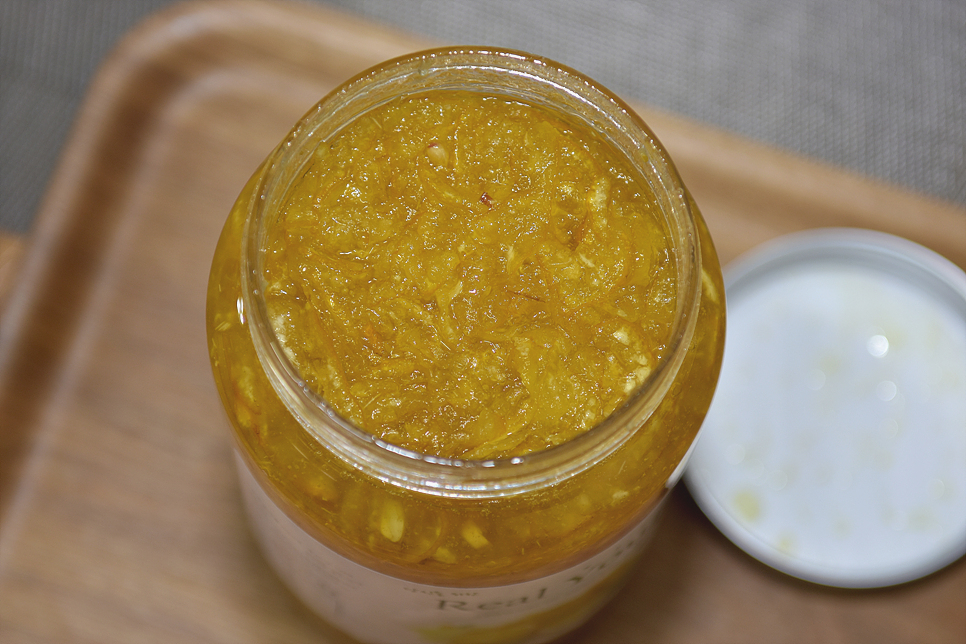
Yuja-cheong (preserved yuja)

Cheong is a name for various sweetened foods in the form of syrups, marmalades, and fruit preserves in Korean cuisine. It is used as a tea base, as a honey-or-sugar substitute in cooking, and as a condiment.

There are liquid varieties such as maesil-cheong (plum syrup), jam-like varieties such as yuja-cheong (yuja marmalade), and conserve-like varieties such as mogwa-cheong (preserved quince).

=== Chutney ===
A chutney is a relish of Indian origin made of fruit, spices and herbs. Although originally intended to be eaten soon after preparation, modern chutneys are often made to be sold, so they require preservatives, such as sugar and vinegar, to ensure they have a suitable shelf life. Green mango chutney, for example, is made by reducing mango pulp with sugar. Two examples of chutneys are verkadela chutney (peanut chutney) and pudina chutney (mint chutney).

=== Confit ===
Confit, the past participle of the French verb confire, "to preserve", is applied both to preservation of meats, and to fruits or vegetables seasoned and cooked with honey or sugar till jam-like. Savory confits, such as those made with garlic or fennel, may call for an oil, such as virgin olive oil, as the preserving agent.

Konfyt (Afrikaans: "jam" or "fruit preserve") is a type of jam eaten in Southern Africa. It is made by boiling selected fruit or fruits (such as strawberries, apricots, oranges, lemons, watermelons, berries, peaches, prickly pears, or others) and sugar, and optionally adding a little ginger to enhance the flavor. The origin of the term is obscure, but it is theorized that it came from the French term confiture and via the Dutch konfijt for candied fruit.

=== Conserve ===
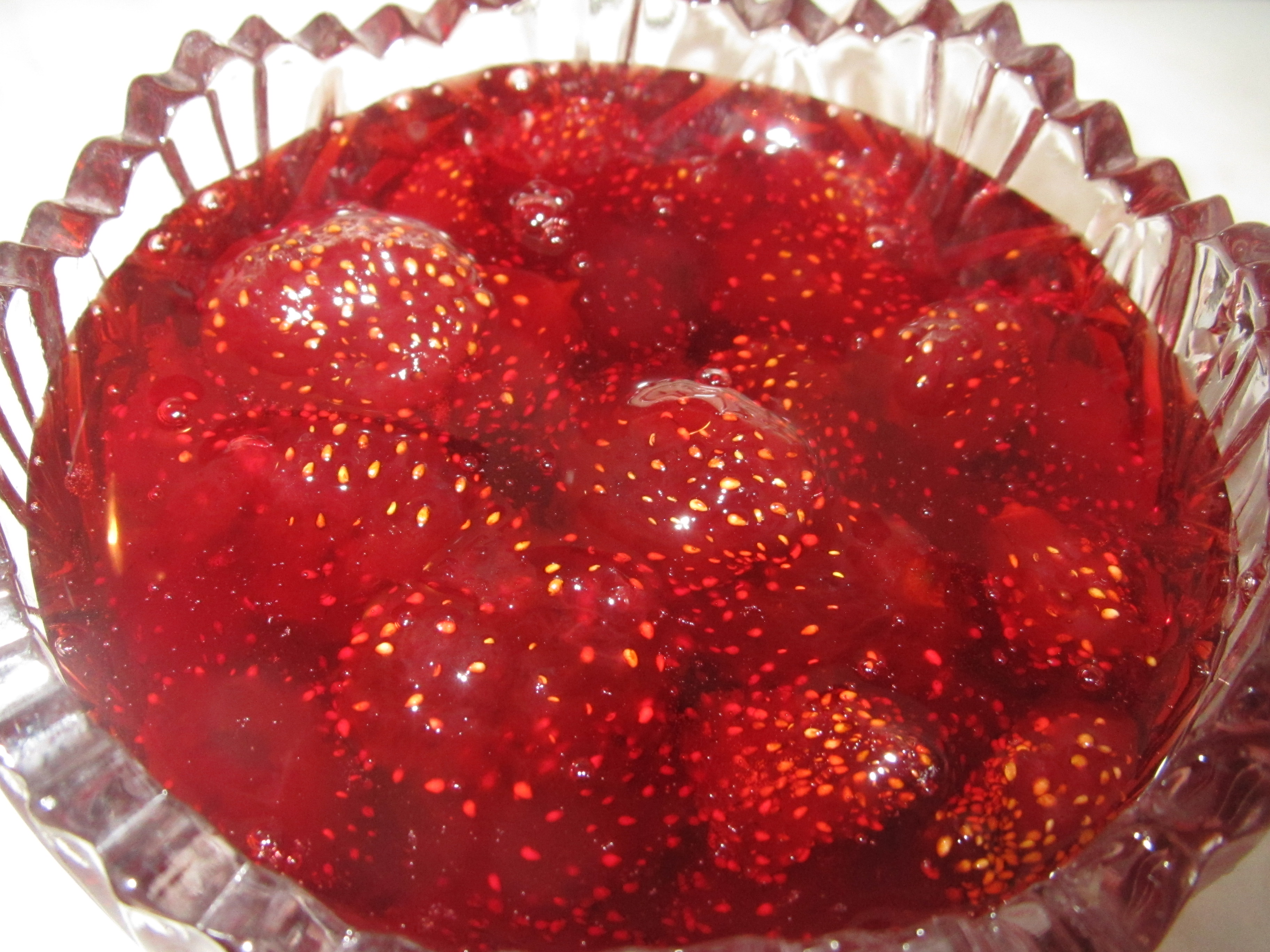
Strawberry varenye (murabba)

A conserve, or whole fruit jam, is a preserve made of fruit stewed in sugar.

The making of conserves can be trickier than making a standard jam; it requires cooking or sometimes steeping the fruit in the hot sugar mixture for just long enough to allow the flavor to be extracted from the fruit, and sugar to penetrate it, but not so long that the fruit breaks down and liquefies. This process can also be achieved by spreading the dry sugar over raw fruit in layers, and leaving for several hours to penetrate into the fruit and soak the water out, then heating the resulting mixture to bring it just to the set point. As a result of this minimal cooking, some fruits are not particularly suitable for making into conserves, because they require cooking for longer periods to avoid faults such as tough skins and spoiling. Currants and gooseberries, and a number of plums are among these fruits.

Because of this shorter cooking period, not as much pectin will be released from the fruit, and consequently conserves, particularly if home-cooked, will sometimes be slightly softer set than some jams.

There is an alternative definition of a conserve: a preserve made from a mixture of fruits or vegetables. Conserves in this sense may also include dried fruit or nuts.

=== Fruit butter ===
Fruit butter, in this context, refers to a process where the whole fruit is forced through a sieve or blended after the heating process.

Fruit butter are generally made from larger fruits, such as apples, plums, peaches, or grapes. Cook until softened and run through a sieve to give a smooth consistency. After sieving, cook the pulp ... add sugar and cook as rapidly as possible with constant stirring.… The finished product should mound up when dropped from a spoon, but should not cut like jelly. Nor should there be any free liquid.

—Berolzheimer, R. (ed,) et al. (1959)

=== Fruit curd ===
Fruit curd is a dessert topping and spread usually made with lemon, lime, orange, or raspberry. The basic ingredients are beaten egg yolks, sugar, fruit juice and zest which are gently cooked together until thick and then allowed to cool, forming a soft, smooth, flavorful spread. Some recipes also include egg whites or butter.

=== Fruit spread ===
In the United States the FDA has Requirements for Specific Standardized Fruit Butters, Jellies, Preserves, and Related Products, "fruit spread" is not defined.

The term is sometimes used for a jam or preserve with no added sugar, but there are many foodstuffs described as "fruit spreads" by leading manufacturers that do contain added sugar.

=== Jam ===
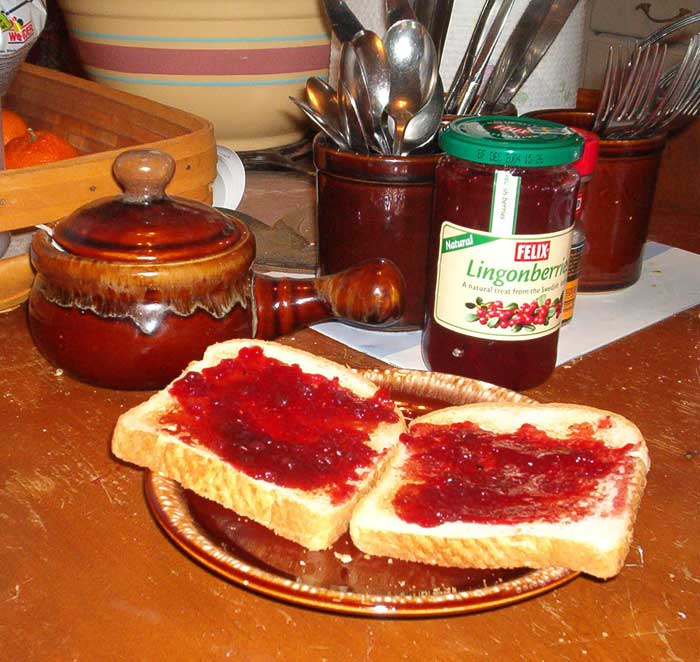
Lingonberry jam on toast

Jam refers to a product made of whole fruit cut into pieces or crushed, then heated with water and sugar until it reaches "jelling" or "setting" point, which is achieved through the action of natural or added pectin. It is then sealed in containers.

Jam making became "a great new industry" in 19th century England, at which point English jam makers had access to a global market, thriving after the repeal of sugar duties in 1874.

Pectin is mainly D-galacturonic acid connected by α (1–4) glycosidic linkages. The side chains of pectin may contain small amounts of other sugars such as L-fructose, D-glucose, D-mannose, and D-xylose. In jams, pectin thickens the final product via cross-linking of the large polymer chains.

Recipes without added pectin use the natural pectin in the fruit to set. Tart apples, sour blackberries, cranberries, currants, gooseberries, Concord grapes, soft plums, and quinces work well in recipes without added pectin.

Other fruits, such as apricots, blueberries, cherries, peaches, pineapple, raspberries, rhubarb, and strawberries are low in pectin. In order to set, or gel, they must be combined with one of the higher pectin fruits or used with commercially produced or homemade pectin. Use of added pectin decreases cooking time.

Freezer jam is uncooked (or cooked less than 5 minutes), then stored frozen. It is popular in parts of North America for its very fresh taste.

=== Jelly ===
This drawing depicts a pectin molecule. These molecules combine to form the network responsible for making jelly

The category of fruit preserve referred to as a jelly (from the French gelée) is a clear or translucent fruit spread made by a process similar to that used for making jam, with the additional step of filtering out the fruit pulp after the initial cooking.

Good jelly is clear and sparkling and has a fresh flavor of the fruit from which it is made. It is tender enough to quiver when moved but holds angles when cut.

The characteristic clarity and jellied consistency of a jelly are qualities it shares with the gelatin-based dessert also called jelly in some places.

High pectin fruits such as quinces, apples, or redcurrants are used for making jelly. In the United States, jellies made from strawberries or concord grapes are most popular and are used for making peanut butter and jelly sandwiches. Fruit jellies may be used in a meal or dish in a similar way to jam. Some jellies, such as redcurrant, or mint, are classic accompaniments to roasted meats such as turkey, game, and lamb.

Pectin is essential to the formation of jelly because it acts as a gelling agent, meaning when the pectin chains combine, they create a network that results in a gel. The strength and effectiveness of the side chains and the bonds they form depend on the pH of the pectin; the optimal pH is between 2.8 and 3.2.

=== Marmalade ===
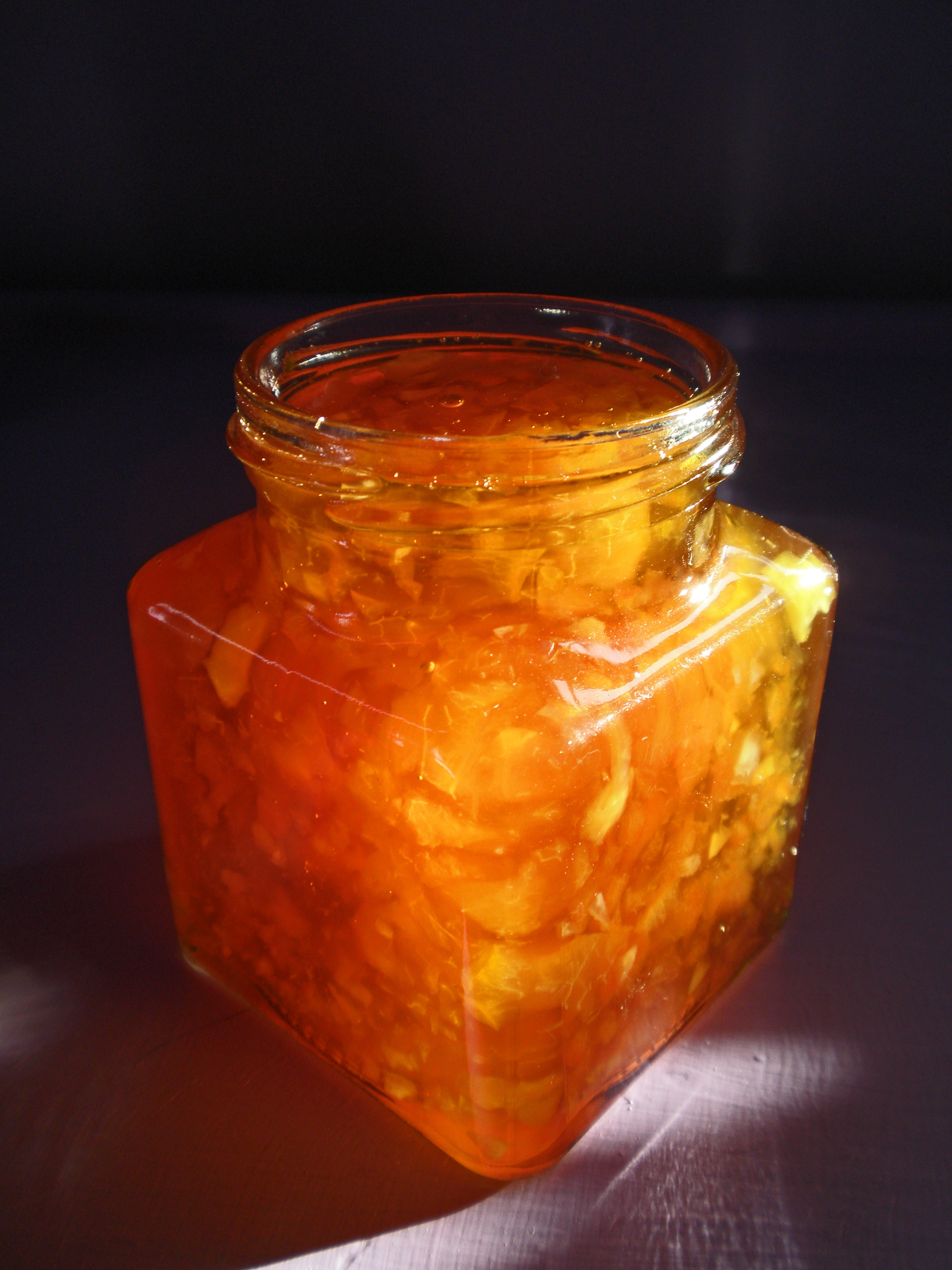
Homemade English marmalade

Marmalade is a fruit preserve made specifically from the juice and peel of citrus fruits boiled with sugar and water. It can be produced from lemons, limes, grapefruits, mandarins, sweet oranges, bergamots and other citrus fruits, or any combination thereof. Marmalade is distinguished from jam by the inclusion of citrus peel, and the use of more water, in which respect it resembles a jelly. It is distinguished from a jelly by containing pieces of fruit peel.

The benchmark citrus fruit for marmalade production in Britain is the bitter Spanish Seville orange, Citrus aurantium var. aurantium, prized for its high pectin content, which gives a good set. The peel has a distinctive bitter taste which it imparts to the preserve.

== Uses ==
Fruit preserves are used in many food preparations and recipes; some examples include:

- Spread on toast
- Part of a peanut butter and jelly sandwich
- The key ingredient for a jam sandwich
- Used to fill sandwich biscuits or pastries such as doughnuts
- Used to sandwich two or more layers of a cake together, notably Victoria Sponge

== Production ==
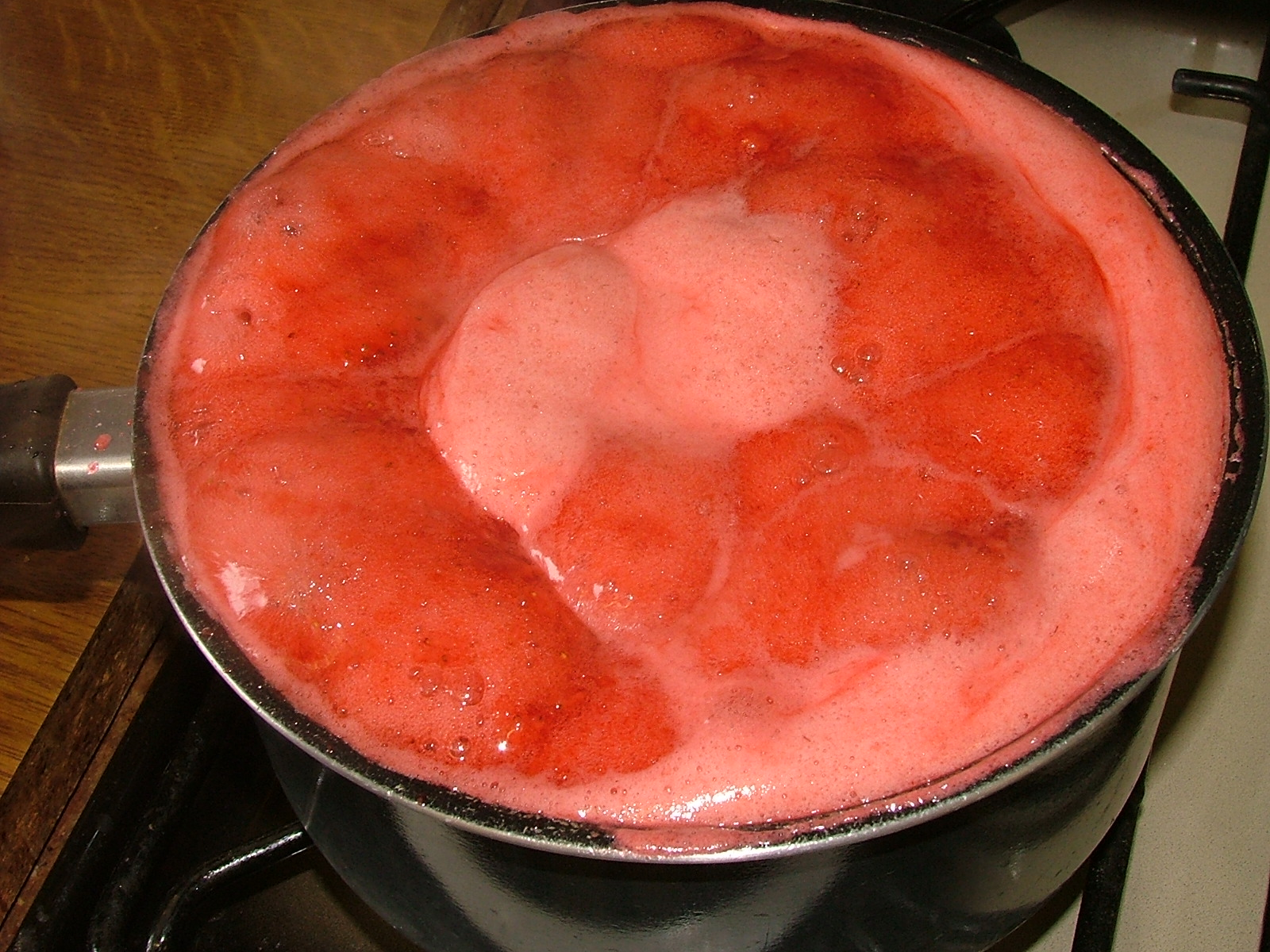
Jam being made in a pot

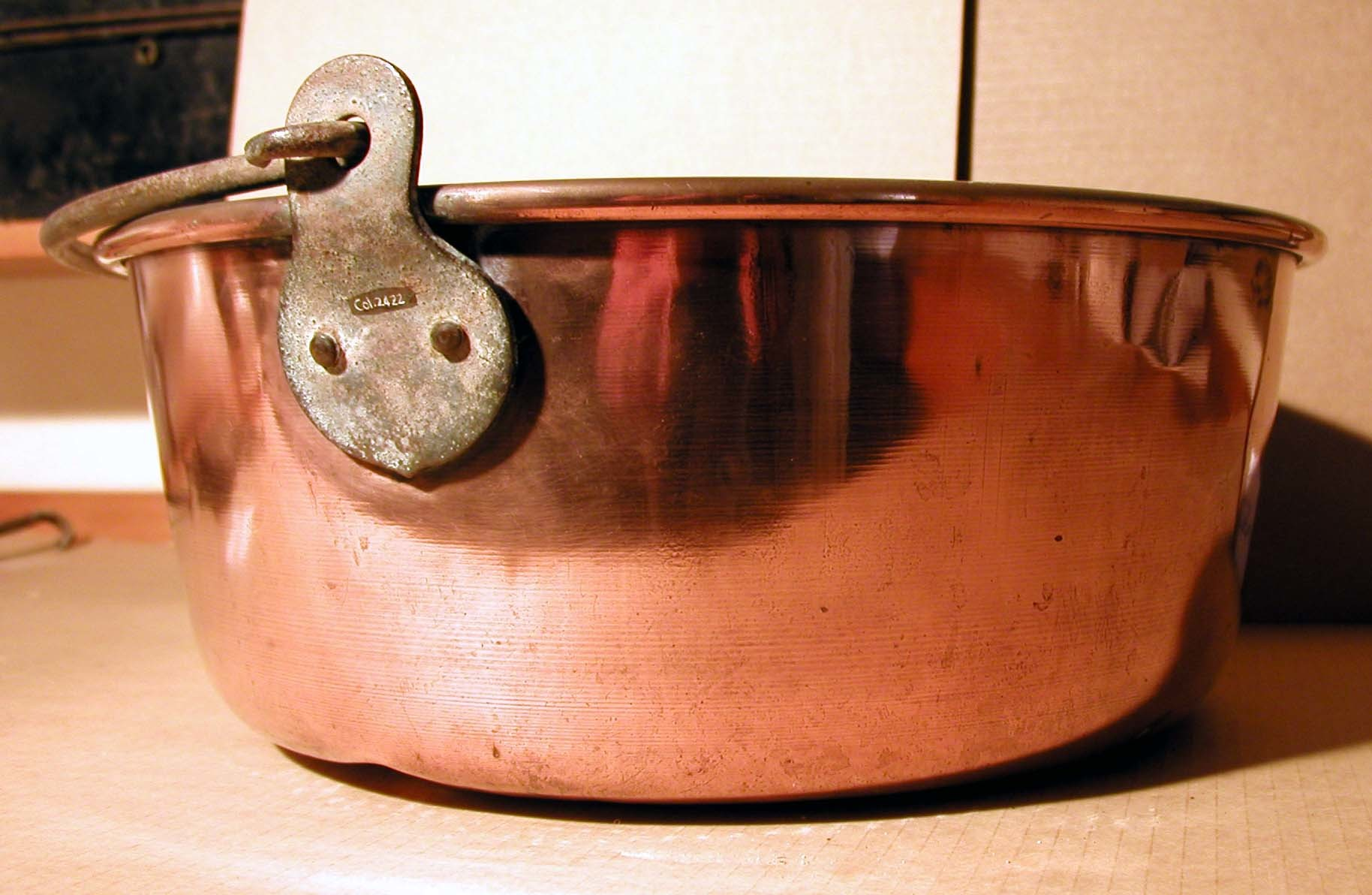
A copper preserving pan

In general, jam is produced by taking mashed or chopped fruit or vegetable pulp and boiling it with sugar and water. The proportion of sugar and fruit varies according to the type of fruit and its ripeness, but a rough starting point is equal weights of each. When the mixture reaches a temperature of 104 °C (219 °F), the acid and the pectin in the fruit react with the sugar, and the jam will set on cooling. Most home cooks work by trial and error rather than temperature measurement, bringing the mixture to a "fast rolling boil", watching to see if the seething mass changes texture, and dropping small samples on a plate to see if they run or set.

Commercially produced jams are usually produced using one of two methods. The first is the open pan method, which is essentially a larger scale version of the method a home jam maker would use. This gives a traditional flavor, with some caramelization of the sugars. The second commercial process involves the use of a vacuum vessel, where the jam is placed under a vacuum, which has the effect of reducing its boiling temperature to anywhere between 65 and 80 °C depending on the recipe and the end result desired. The lower boiling temperature enables the water to be driven off as it would be when using the traditional open pan method, but with the added benefit of retaining more of the volatile flavor compounds from the fruit, preventing caramelization of the sugars, and of course reducing the overall energy required to make the product. However, once the desired amount of water has been driven off, the jam still needs to be heated briefly to 95 to 100 °C (203 to 212 °F) for safety, to kill pathogens that would otherwise proliferate.

During commercial filling it is common to use a flame to sterilize the rim and lid of jars to destroy any yeasts and molds, which could cause spoilage during storage. Steam is commonly injected immediately before lidding; when the steam condenses after lidding it creates a vacuum which both helps prevent spoilage and pulls down a tamper-evident "safety button" when used.

== Packaging ==
The high sugar content makes jam keep for exceedingly long times before unsealing the packaging, and for a long time at room temperature after opening, as fruit preserves are typically of low water activity. Glass or plastic jars are often used to store jam that is not all to be used at once, as a replaceable tightly-fitting lid can be used. Other methods of packaging jam, especially for industrially produced products, include cans and plastic packets, especially used in the food service industry for individual servings.

== Legal definitions ==
=== Canadian regulations ===
Under the Processed Products Regulations (C.R.C., c. 291), jams, jellies, citrus marmalade, and preserves are defined. Each must contain a minimum percentage of the named fruit and a minimum percentage of water-soluble solids. Jams "shall be the product made by boiling fruit, fruit pulp or canned fruit to a suitable consistency with water and a sweetening ingredient", jellies "shall be the product made by boiling fruit juice or concentrated fruit juice that is free from seeds and pulp with water and a sweetening ingredient until it acquires a gelatinous consistency".

In Canada, fruit jam is categorized into two types: fruit jam and fruit jam with pectin. Both types contain fruit, fruit pulp or canned fruit and are boiled with water and a sweetening ingredient. Both must have 66% water-soluble solids. Fruit jam and fruit jam with pectin may contain a class II preservative, a pH adjusting agent or an antifoaming agent. Both types cannot contain apple or rhubarb fruit.

Though both types of jam are very similar, there are some differences in fruit percent, added pectin, and added acidity. Fruit jam must have at least 45% fruit and may contain added pectin to compensate for the natural pectin level found in the fruit. Fruit jam with pectin need only contain 27% fruit and is allowed to contain added acidity to compensate for the natural acidity of the fruit.

In Canada, the Food and Drug Regulations of the Food and Drugs Act of Canada categorizes jelly into two types: jelly, and jelly with pectin. Jelly may be made from the fruit, the fruit juice, or a fruit juice concentrate, and must contain at least 62% water-soluble solids. Jelly may contain an acid ingredient that makes up for any lack in the natural acidity of the fruit, a chemical to adjust the pH, and/or an antifoaming agent. Jelly with pectin must be made with a minimum of 62% water-soluble solids and a minimum of 32% juice of the named fruit, and may contain an acid ingredient that compensates for the lack in the natural acidity of the fruit; the additional juice of another fruit; a gelling agent; food color; a Class II preservative (such as benzoates, sorbates, or nitrites); a chemical to adjust the pH; and/or an antifoaming agent.

=== European Union directives on jam ===
In the European Union, the jam directive (Council Directive 79/693/EEC, 24 July 1979) set minimum standards for the amount of "fruit" in jam, but the definition of fruit was expanded to take account of several unusual kinds of jam made in the EU. For this purpose, "fruit" is considered to include fruits that are not usually treated in a culinary sense as fruits, such as tomatoes, cucumbers, and pumpkins; fruits that are not normally made into jams; and vegetables that are sometimes made into jams, such as rhubarb (the edible part of the stalks), carrots, and sweet potatoes. This definition continues to apply in the new directive, Council Directive 2001/113/EC of 20 December 2001 relating to fruit jams, jellies and marmalades and sweetened chestnut purée intended for human consumption.

Extra jam is subject to somewhat stricter rules that set higher standards for the minimum fruit content (45% instead of 35% as a general rule, but lower for some fruits such as redcurrants and blackcurrants), specifying the use of unconcentrated fruit pulp, and forbidding the mixture of certain fruits and vegetables with others.

Extra jelly similarly specifies that the proportion of fruit juice or aqueous extracts in the finished product must not be less than that laid down for the manufacture of extra jam.

=== US FDA definitions ===
The U.S. Food and Drug Administration (FDA) published standards of identity in 21 CFR 150, and treats jam and preserves as synonymous, but distinguishes jelly from jams and preserves. All of these are cooked and pectin-gelled fruit products, but jellies are made from fruit juice, without seeds and pulp, while jams and preserves are gelled fruit that may include the seeds and pulp. The United States Department of Agriculture offers grading service based on these standards.

== See also ==
- Bacon jam
- Beer jam
- Carrot jam
- Confiture
- Lekvar
- Strawberry jam
- Lingonberry jam
- List of spreads
- Pepper jelly
- Quince cheese
- Spoon sweets
- Tomato jam
