= Hibiscus leaves pickle =

Indian pickle

Commercial Andhra Gongura pickle

Hibiscus leaves pickle is a popular pickle in Andhra Pradesh made with fresh Roselle (Hibiscus sabdariffa) or Gongura leaves, where it is known as Gongura pacchadi or Gongura Pickle. It is also consumed in Telangana, Tamil Nadu, Maharashtra, and Karnataka. In some of India's North-Eastern states, the plant is known as aamelli or mwitha. These sour/spicy pickles are also available commercially.

== See also ==
- Mixed pickle
- Indian pickle
- Indian cuisine
- List of Indian pickles
- List of chutneys
- List of pickled foods
