= List of Indian pickles =

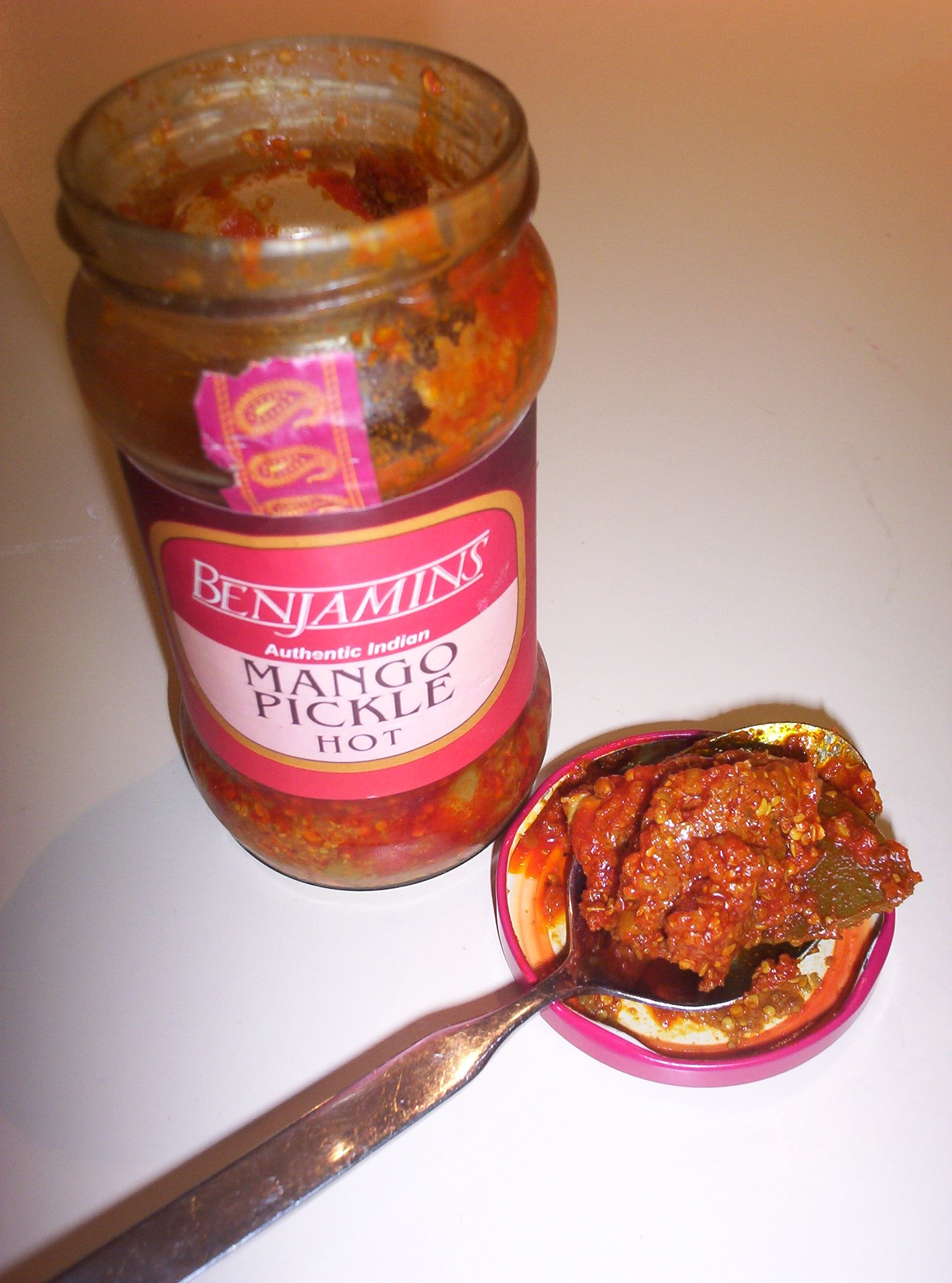
Indian hot mango pickle

This is a list of common Indian pickles, which have a wide range of flavours and textures.

Indian pickles are generally pickled with oil, vinegar, lemon juice, or water. Indian pickles are often made into fresh relish and chutney, which provides additional flavours to food. Many types of foods in Indian cuisine are pickled, such as mangoes, gooseberries, and lemons. Some Indian families have family recipes for pickles and chutney, passed down through generations.

== Nomenclature ==
Pickle in general is known by different names throughout India.

1) Āchār (আচার) in Bangla

2) Achār (अचार) in Hindi

3) Ūrugāi (ஊறுகாய்) in Tamil

4) Achar (അച്ചാർ) in Malayalam

5) Uppinakāyi (ಉಪ್ಪಿನಕಾಯಿ) in Kannada

6) Uppaḍ (ಉಪ್ಪಡ್) in Tulu

7) Ūragāya (ఊరగాయ) or Pacchaḍi (పచ్చడి) in Telugu

8) Loṇcha (लोणचं) in Marathi and Konkani

9) Juā (ଜୁଆ) or Āchārå (ଆଚାର) in Odia

10) Athaṇũ (અથાણું) in Gujarati.

== Pickle gooseberry ==
Pickle gooseberry or Indian gooseberry pickle is a popular spicy pickle in South Asia, India, and Pakistan. Gooseberries are a good source of vitamin C, vitamin A, calcium, and phosphorus. It is prepared by pressure-cooking gooseberries. Then, mustard seeds are tempered in oil and the gooseberries and other ingredients are added. The pickle can be stored in a refrigerator and used for about 15 days.

== Assorted pickle ==
Assorted pickle, also referred to as mixed pickles, is mixed pickle in Indian and Pakistani cuisine. It is prepared by boiling a marinade and then cooking vegetables in the marinade.

== Carrot pickle ==
Carrot pickle is prepared by dicing a carrot and adding green chili peppers and ginger.

== Garlic pickle ==
Garlic pickle is a popular spicy pickle in Andhra Pradesh and Tamilnadu. It is prepared by mixing peeled garlic cloves with mustard seeds and jaggery along with a pinch of salt, with jaggery acting as the sweetener. Tamil people add some turmeric, chilli powder and a pinch of salt to the stir fried garlic

== Green chili pickle ==
Green chili pickle is manufactured in Rajasthan, Karnataka, Maharashtra, and other places. It is commonly used as a condiment with the main dishes. In Rajasthan, it is prepared by slitting chillies length-wise and frying them with ginger and garlic. Other flavouring agents include mango powder, nimbu ras, and fenugreek. It is considered a Rajasthani specialty and is sometimes used as a flavour for Indian snack foods.

== Roselle leaves pickle ==
Roselle or hibiscus leaves pickle (Hibiscus sabdariffa) is a popular pickle in Andhra Pradesh where it is known as gongura pacchadi. It is also consumed in Telangana, Tamil Nadu, Maharashtra, and Karnataka. In some of India's northeastern states, the plant is known as aamelli or mwitha.

== Indian pickle ==
A dish termed "Indian pickle" may include cabbage, cauliflower, carrot, french beans (green beans), onion, radishes, gherkins, celery, garlic, and other foods.

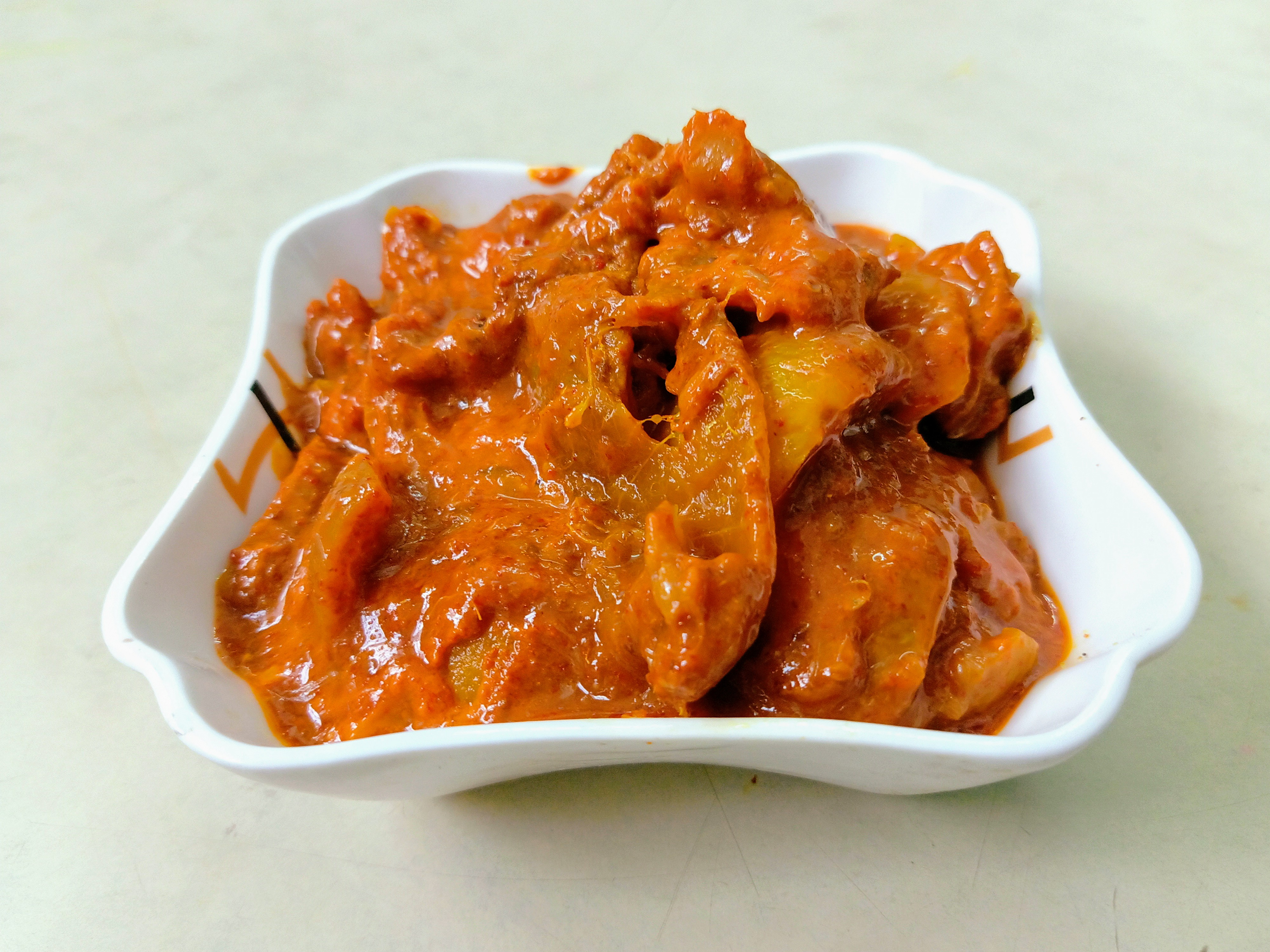
Lemon pickle in India

== Meats ==
Meats that are pickled in Indian cuisine include mutton, Fish, pork, quail, sometimes chicken, shrimp, and lobster.

== Onion pickle ==
Spicy onion pickle is prepared by cutting onions into pieces and rubbing salt over them. After one day, the excess water is drained and the onions are marinated with other spices for four or five days.

== Raw mango and chickpea pickle ==
Raw mango and chickpea pickle is prepared by marinating grated raw green mango with salt and turmeric powder for one day and mixing it with soaked chickpea and other ingredients, then letting it sit for four days.

== Red chili pickle ==
Red chili pickle is prepared by slitting red chillies length-wise, stuffing them with fenugreek powder, and placing them in a closed porcelain jar for one month.

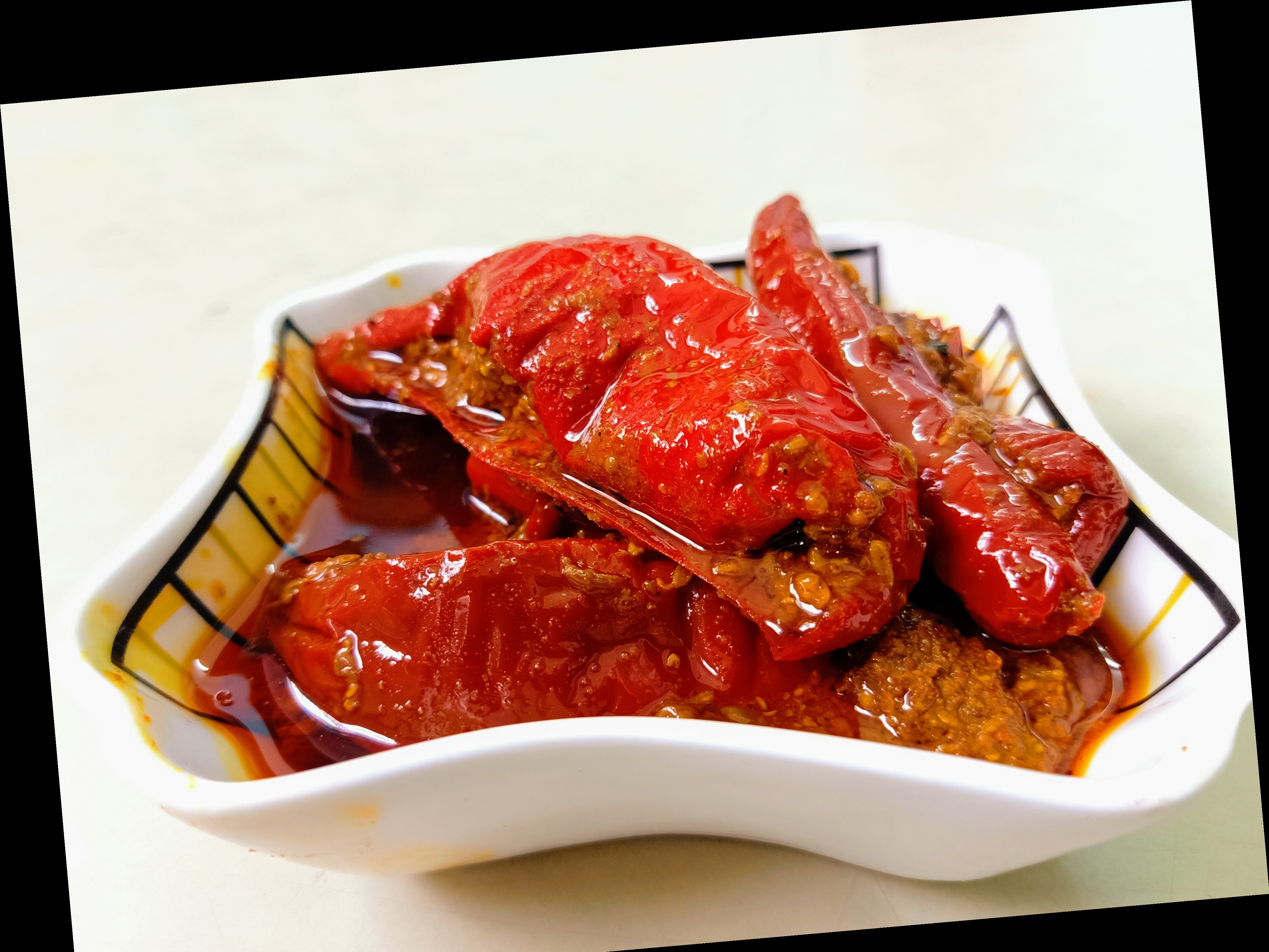
Red chilli pickle from India

== Sweet mango pickle ==
Sweet mango pickle is prepared by cutting mangoes into pieces and adding sugar syrup over them, along with other ingredients, then keeping them sealed in a jar under the sun until the mangoes become soft.

== Sweet sour lemon pickle ==
Sweet sour lemon pickle is a sweet and sour pickle. It is prepared by cutting lemons into halves and sprinkling salt and pouring sugar syrup over them and marinating for one week.

== Tomato pickle ==
Tomato pickle is a spicy pickle. It is prepared by cooking ripe tomatoes and adding spices along with mustard powder.

== See also ==
- Indian cookbooks
- List of chutneys
- List of pickled foods
