= Blatjang =

South African chutney made of dried fruit

Blatjang is a South African chutney made preferably fresh or dried fruit (usually apricots) and chillies cooked in vinegar and a staple in most South African households, served as a condiment with South African meat dishes like bobotie and braai.

== Overview ==
Blatjang is a South African chutney made of dried fruit (usually apricots) and chillies cooked in vinegar and a staple in most South African households, served as a condiment with South African meat dishes like bobotie and braai.

Blatjang has Cape Malay origins with Indonesian, Malay, Indian and Dutch influences, reflecting South Africa's diverse culture. Blatjang is an Afrikaans word that can be drawn from “belacan” in Malay or “blachang” in Indonesian, which is an unrelated condiment to chutney.

== See also ==
- Dahi chutney – Indian food
- Furikake – Japanese seasoning eaten similarly to dry chutney
- Sooth (chutney) – Sweet chutney
- List of chutneys – Chutney varieties
- List of condiments
- List of dips – Type of condiment
