= Major Grey's Chutney =

Chutney invented by Major Grey

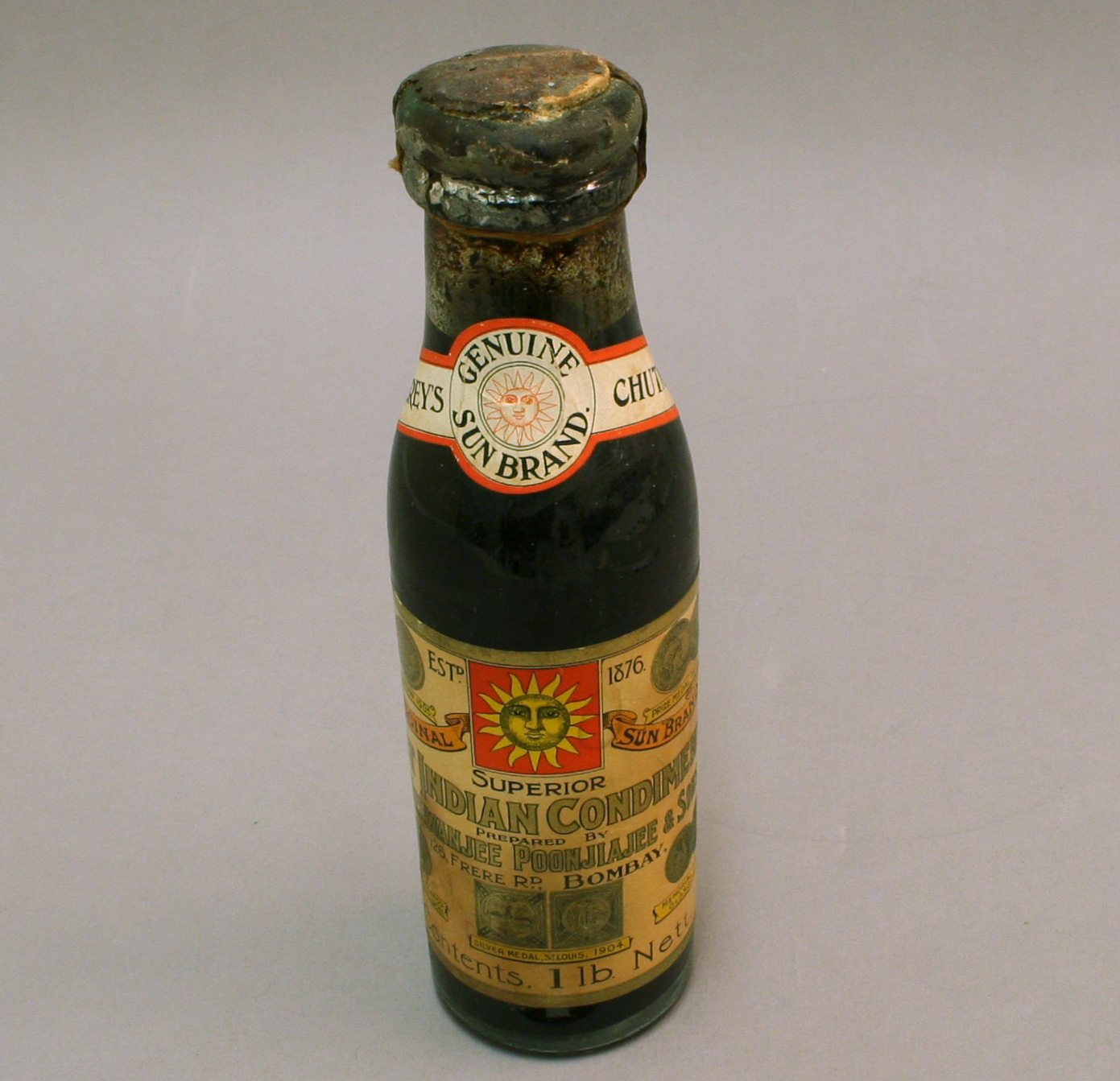
A clear glass bottle from the 1904 World’s Fair containing Sun Brand Major Grey’s Chutney.

Major Grey's Chutney is a type of chutney, reputedly created by a 19th-century British Army officer of the same name who, though likely apocryphal, presumably lived in British India. Its characteristic ingredients are mango, raisins, vinegar, lime juice, onion, tamarind extract (occasionally), sweetening, and spices.

It has been described as a mild chutney compared to others that have a spicier flavour profile. In 1982, Major Grey's Chutney was described as being the most popular type of chutney used in the United States.

The product was long associated with Sharwood’s Mango Chutney, Major Grey version, but this is no longer mass-produced for sale in the United Kingdom.

== Commercial varieties ==
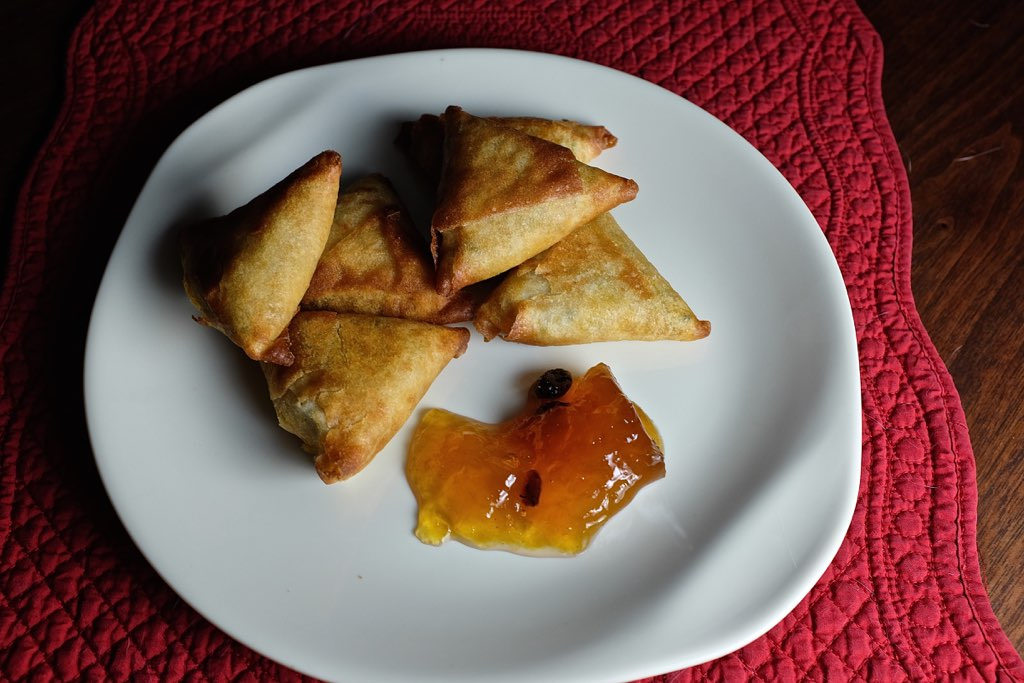
Vegetable samosas with Major Grey's Chutney

Commercial Major Grey's Chutney products typically contain similar ingredients, with some variations occurring in the formulations of the various products.

=== India ===
Major Grey's Mango Chutney is mass-produced by Sun Brand in India and by Desai Brothers in Poona, India under the brand name Mother's Recipe, and has been exported to Singapore. Many Indian condiments were fiery hot and too spicy for Anglo-Indian palates. A British army major named Grey supposedly had a sweet variety of mango chutney made especially to suit his taste. Thus Major Grey Chutney is thought to have been born, made by Merwanjee Poonjiajee, established in the year 1876. Mango chutney and curry powder made under the "SUN BRAND" were some of the first of their kind to be exported from India.

=== North America ===
Manufacturers such as Patak's and Sharwood's mass-produce a "Major Grey's Mango Chutney". One of the oldest brands, reputedly the first manufacturer to popularise the chutney in the West, is Crosse & Blackwell, now partly owned by the J.M. Smucker Company. It has been suggested that Crosse & Blackwell purchased the formulation for Major Grey's Chutney "probably in the early 1800s".

== See also ==
- Anglo-Indian cuisine
- Earl Grey tea
- Green mango chutney
- List of chutneys
