= Sandwich pickle =

Sandwich pickle may refer to:

- Branston Pickle, a United Kingdom brand of jarred pickled relish
- Piccalilli, a pickle of chopped vegetables and spices
- Mixed pickle, various pickled fruits and vegetables
- Pickled cucumber, sliced lengthwise and layered into a sandwich
