= Sooth (chutney) =

Sweet chutney

Saunth
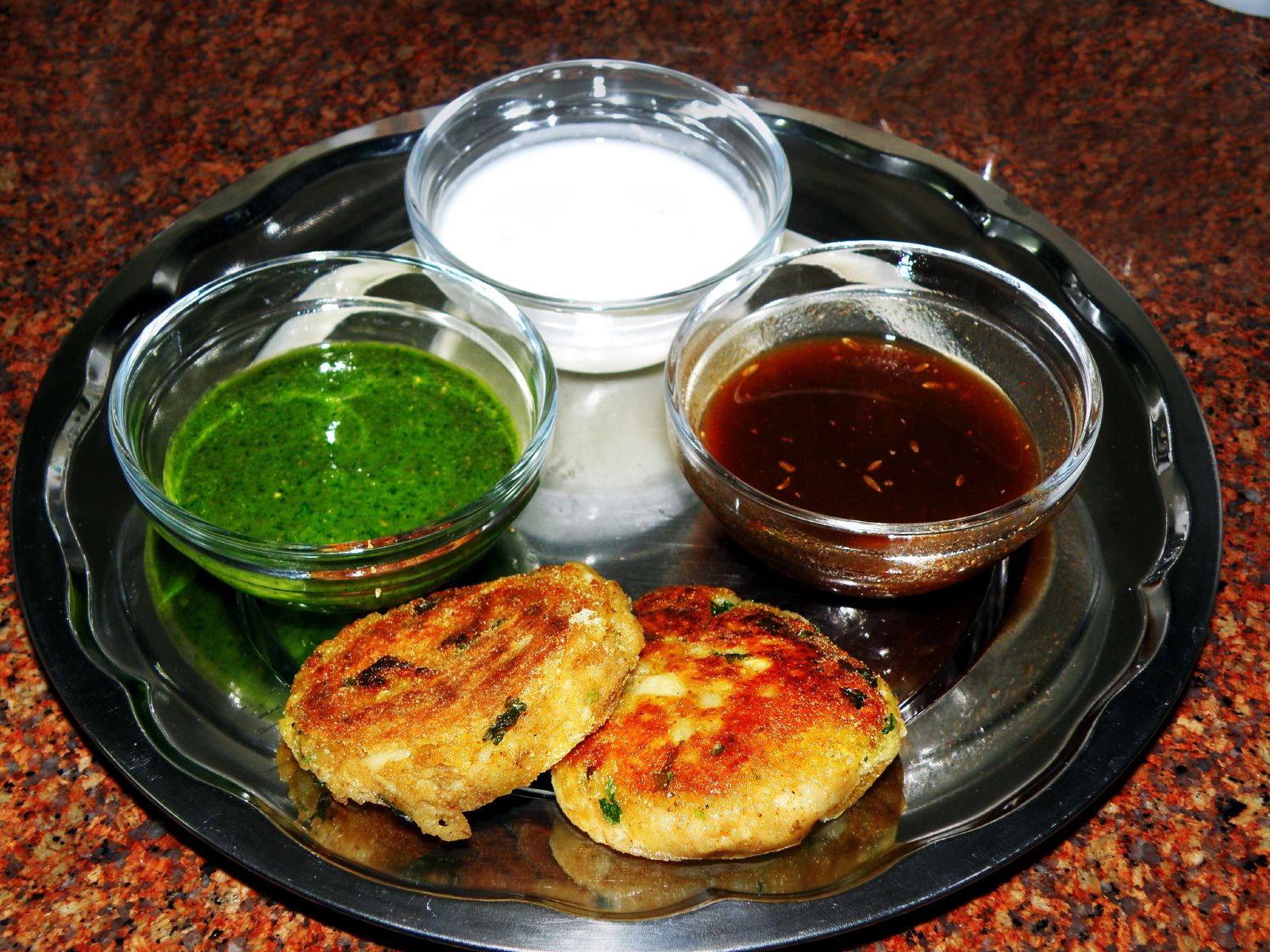
- Aloo tikki served with mint (left) and saunth chutneys (right), and dahi
- Type: Chutney
- Place of origin: India
- Region or state: North India
- Main ingredients: Tamarind, dried ginger, dates
- Variations: yogurt

Sooth (or saunth) is a sweet chutney used in Indian chaat fried dough snacks. It is made from dried ginger (sooth) and tamarind (or imli) paste, hence the name. The chutney is brownish-red in colour.

Modern sooth is often made with dates. However, sooth made with dried ginger adds a special flavour to the chaat and is preferred in most parts of North India.

== See also ==
- List of chutneys
