= Peanut chutney =

Condiment made from peanuts

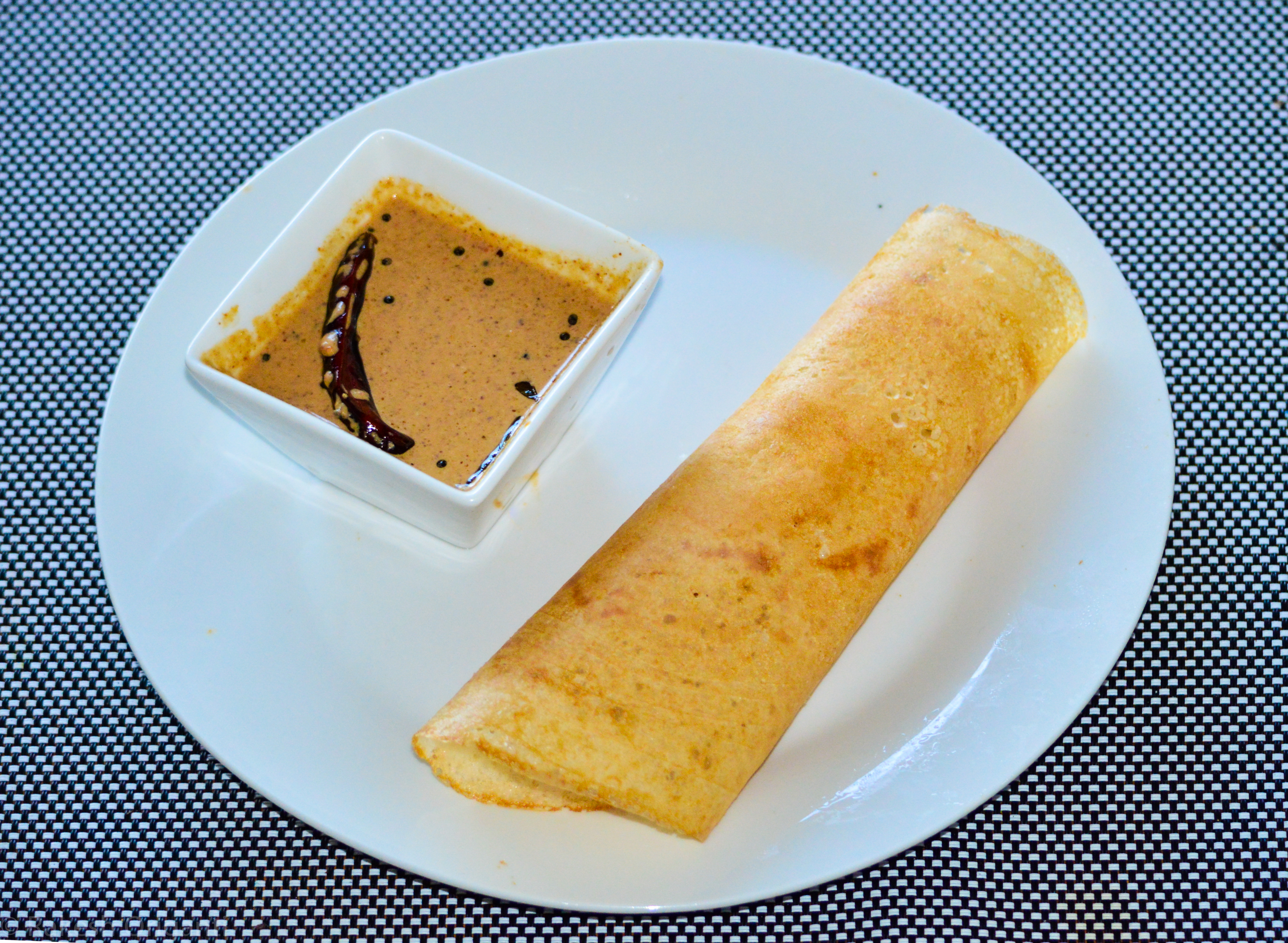
- Plain dosa with peanut chutney (pictured left)
- Type: Chutney
- Course: Side dish
- Region or state: Indian subcontinent
- Main ingredients: Peanut
- Ingredients generally used: Chiles, salt, and tamarind

Peanut chutney is a mildly spicy chutney side dish, originating from the Indian subcontinent, that can be used with several snack foods and breakfast foods.

== Recipe ==
Peanuts are shallow fried in oil and ground with fried green chilies or dry chilies or a combination of both, some salt and tamarind. Fried garlic and lemon juice can be added for flavour. All the ingredients are ground in a mixer (blender) with some water. After diluting this chutney to required consistency, it can be tempered with fried cumin seeds, mustard seeds and curry leaves.

Peanut chutney is good to go as a side dish with idly, dosa of all types, rotte, punugulu of all types, pakoda and many other snack foods and breakfast foods.

== See also ==
- List of chutneys
- List of peanut dishes
- Peanut sauce
