= Green mango chutney =

Indian chutney made from unripe mangoes

Mango chutney
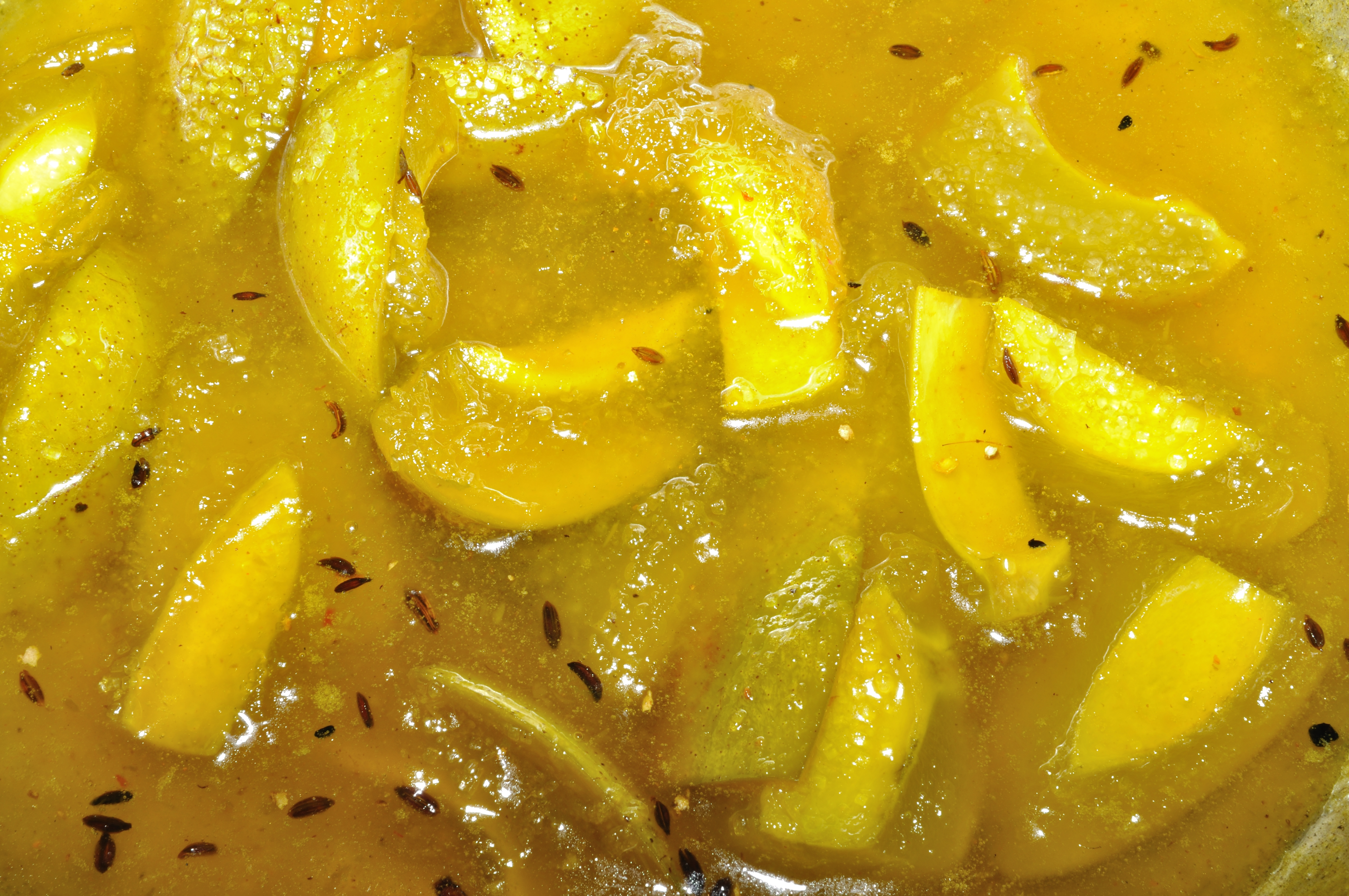
- Mango chutney with cumin seeds
- Type: Chutney
- Course: Condiment
- Region or state: South Asia, Caribbean
- Main ingredients: Raw mango

Green mango chutney, also known as raw mango chutney, is an Indian chutney prepared from unripe mangoes. Ripe mangoes are sweet and are not used for chutneys as they are eaten raw. Green unripe mangoes are hard and sour, and they are cooked as chutneys. Mango chutneys are tangy in taste.

== Preparation ==
The mangoes are peeled and sprinkled with salt and turmeric, then fried in oil along with spices. Water is added and heated until the mango becomes soft.

=== Ingredients ===
The main ingredients in green mango chutney are chopped raw mangoes and a mixture of cumin seeds, fennel seeds, nigella seeds, fenugreek seeds and mustard seeds. An Australian variation of the dish features raisins and apples.

== See also ==
- Major Grey's Chutney
- List of chutneys
