= List of chutneys =

Chutney varieties

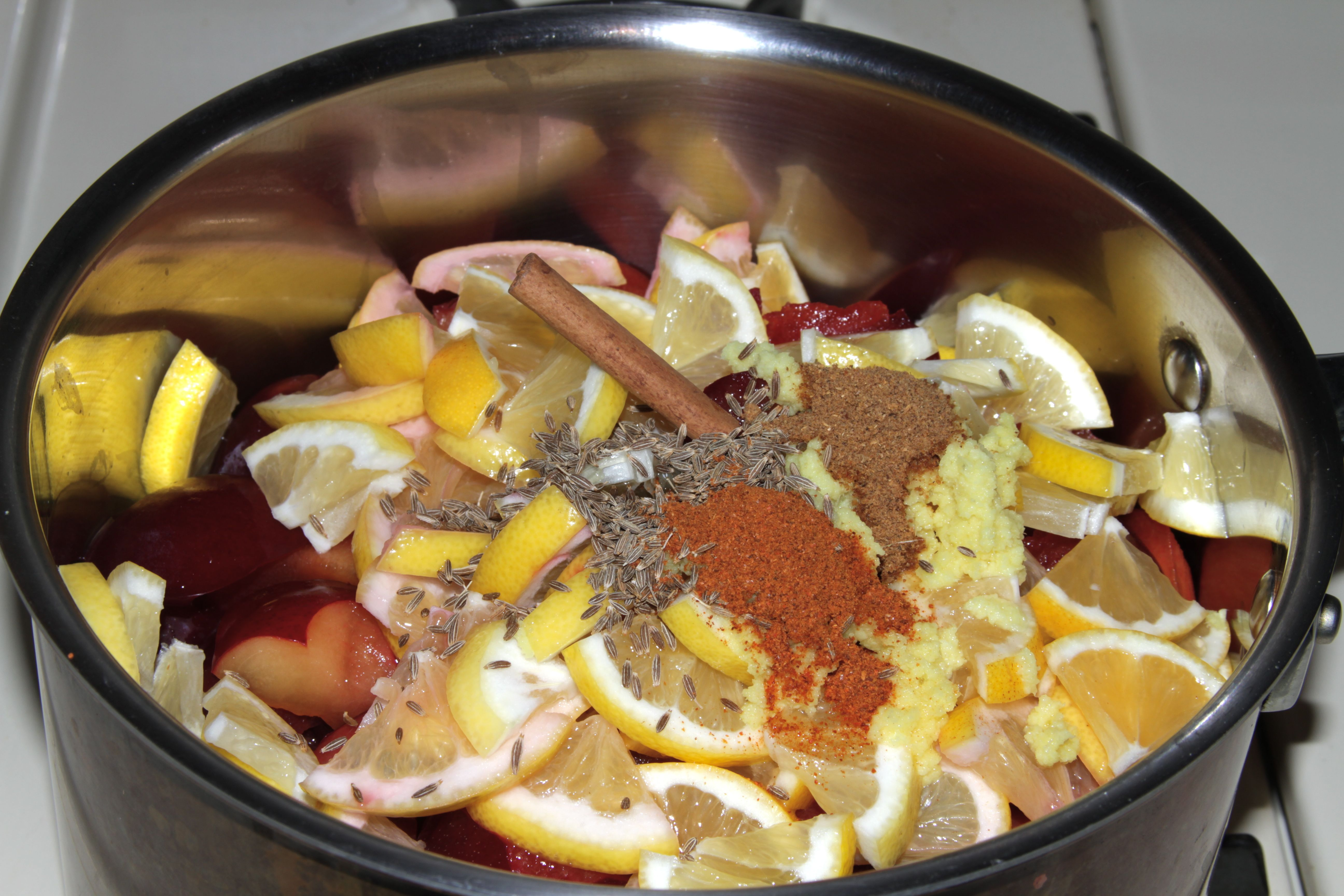
Ingredients being used in the preparation of a plum chutney

This is a list of notable chutney varieties. Chutney is a sauce and condiment in Indian cuisine, the cuisines of the Indian subcontinent and South Asian cuisine. It is made from a highly variable mixture of spices, vegetables, or fruit. Chutney originated in India, and is similar in preparation and usage to a pickle. In contemporary times, chutneys and pickles are a mass-produced food product.

== Chutneys ==
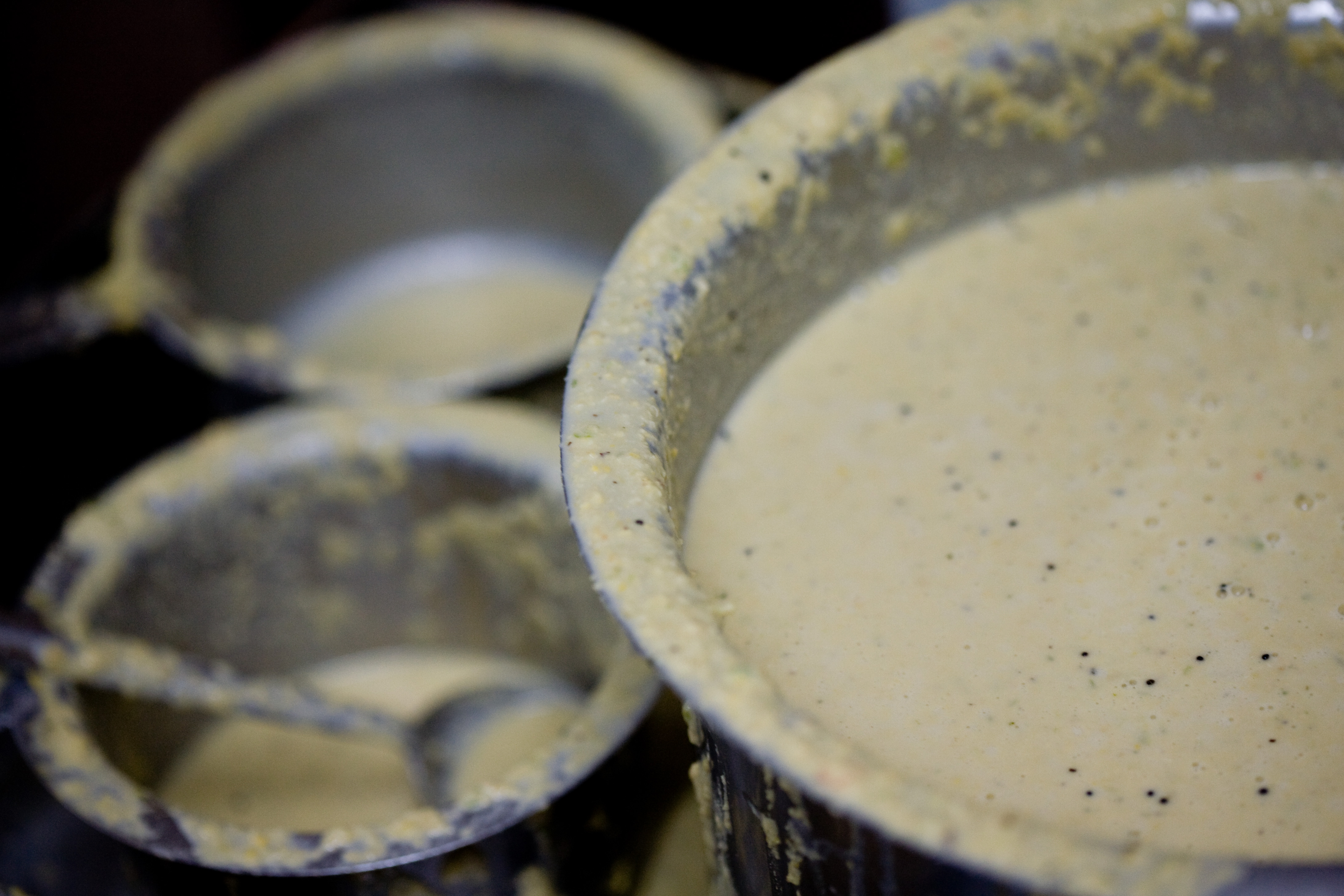
Fresh coconut chutney

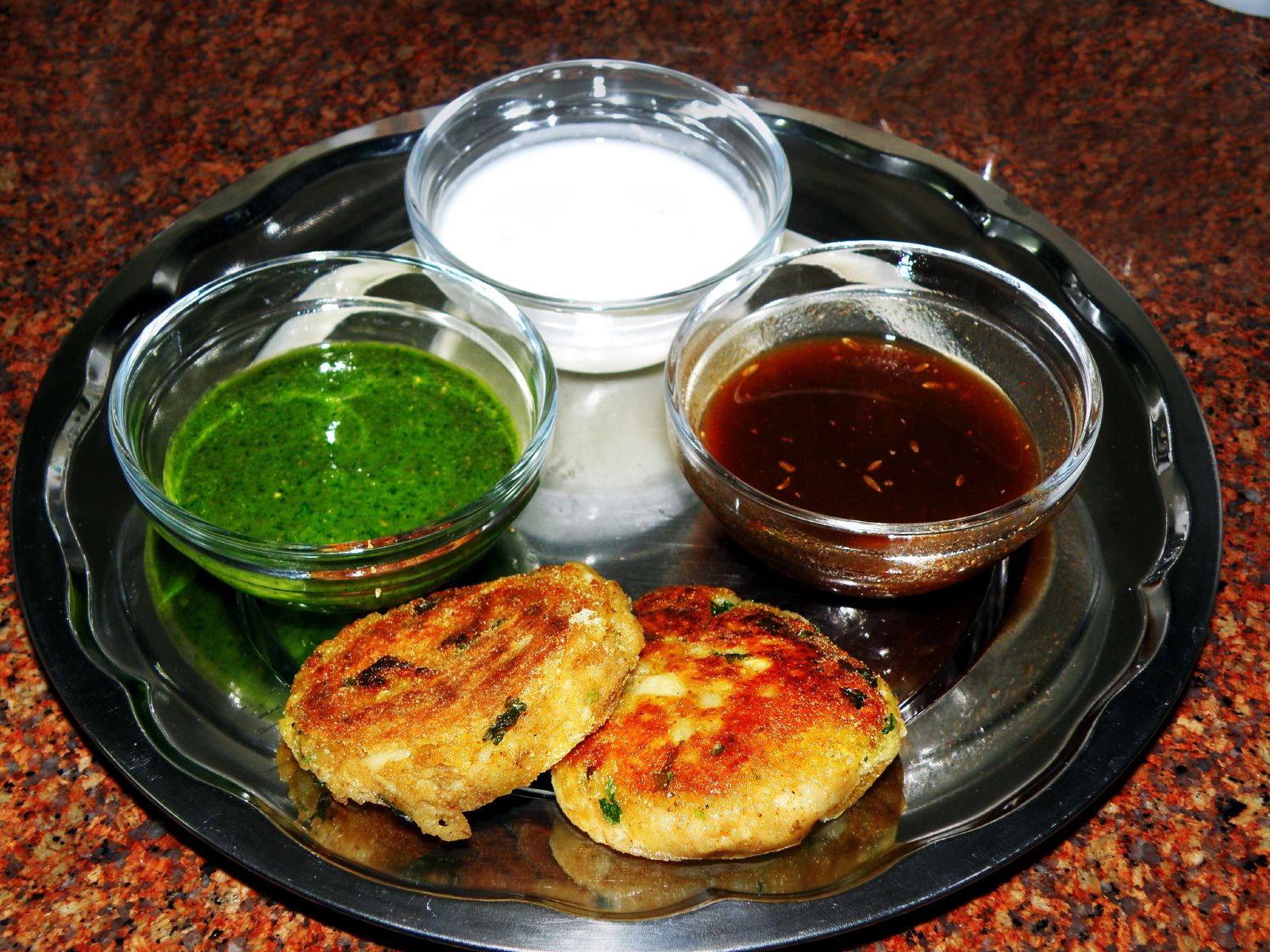
Mint chutney (left), saunth chutney (right), yogurt (top) and aloo tikki (bottom)

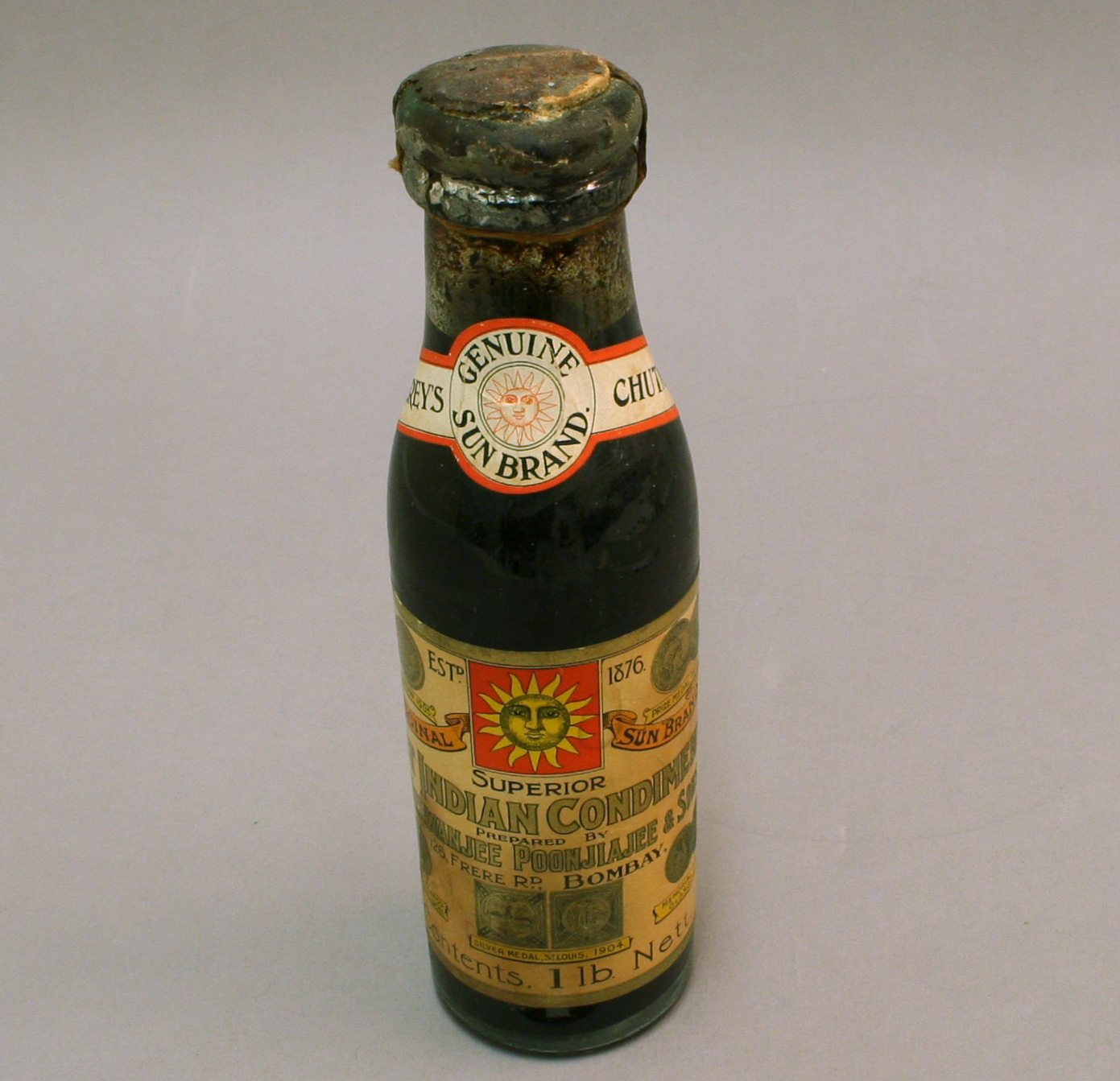
A clear glass bottle of Sun Brand Major Grey's Chutney from the 1904 World’s Fair

- Blatjang —a South African chutney made from dried fruit.
- Branston Pickle—a jarred, mass-produced pickled chutney first made in England in 1922 by Crosse & Blackwell. It is sweet and spicy with a chutney-like consistency, containing chunks of vegetables in a thick brown sticky sauce.
- Chammanthi podi—a dry condiment and coconut chutney from the Indian state of Kerala.
- Coconut chutney—a South Indian chutney side dish and condiment, it is common in South Indian states. It is made with coconut pulp ground with other ingredients such as tamarind, green chili peppers and coriander.
- Coriander chutney—common in Indian cuisine.
- Dahi chutney—strained yogurt mixed into a chutney of onions and (for example) mint, popular in South India. In North India this is called raita.
- Garlic chutney—prepared using fresh garlic, dry or fresh coconut, groundnuts and green or red chili peppers, prepared in both wet and dried forms.
- Gooseberry chutney—gooseberry (amla) chutney or "amlakir chutney" is common in Bengali cuisine. It is prepared by boiling raw sliced gooseberries in spicy jaggery or sugar syrup.
- Green mango chutney—an Indian, Kenyan chutney prepared using unripe mangoes.
- Hara choley chutney—made with raw unripe green chickpeas, often mixed with green coriander leaves.
- Hog plum chutney—common in Bengali and Karnataka cuisine. It is called "Amrar chutney" in West Bengal. Ambade (tulu) chutney made from hog plum is a special dish from coastal districts of the Karnataka state of India (Bharat).
- Kachri ki chutney—made with kachri (wild melon).
- Major Grey's Chutney—reputedly created by a 19th-century British Army officer of the same name who, though likely apocryphal, presumably lived in British India. It has been described as a mild chutney compared to others that have a spicier flavor profile.
- Mango ginger chutney—a Bengali chutney prepared using mango ginger (amada) and tamarind (tetul) paste. Usually served as a condiment with samosa (singara) and other fritters.
- Papaya chutney—a chutney common in Bengali cuisine. This chutney which is also called "plastic chutney" is prepared with boiling fresh sliced green papaya in water with sugar and lemon juice. Dried fruits like raisins and cashews may also be added later.
- Peanut chutney—a mildly spicy chutney that can be used to accompany many various foods.
- Pineapple chutney—common in Bengali cuisine as "anaros er chutney". This chutney is prepared by boiling thin slices of pineapple (anaras) in sugar or jaggery syrup. Pomegranate seeds can also be added with sliced pineapples.
- Pudina chutney—prepared using mint.
- Ridge gourd chutney—part of Udupi cuisine eaten during the meal or as accompaniment to snacks like dosa or idli.
- Saunth—a sweet chutney used in Indian chaats, made from dried ginger (sooth) and tamarind (imli) paste, hence the name.
- Tamarind chutney—also known as imli chutney, it is used in some Indian snacks. Tamarind chutney made from imli, banana, and some spices can also be used with samosa, kachori, and other fried Indian snacks.
- Tomato chutney—a type of chutney prepared using tomatoes as a primary ingredient. Tamtar kasundi originated in Bengal and is typically a spicy and savory tomato and mustard chutney. Tomato chutney has been a mass-produced product in the United States. Gordon & Dilworth in New York produced it in the 1890s–1900s, and exported some of the product.

== Gallery ==
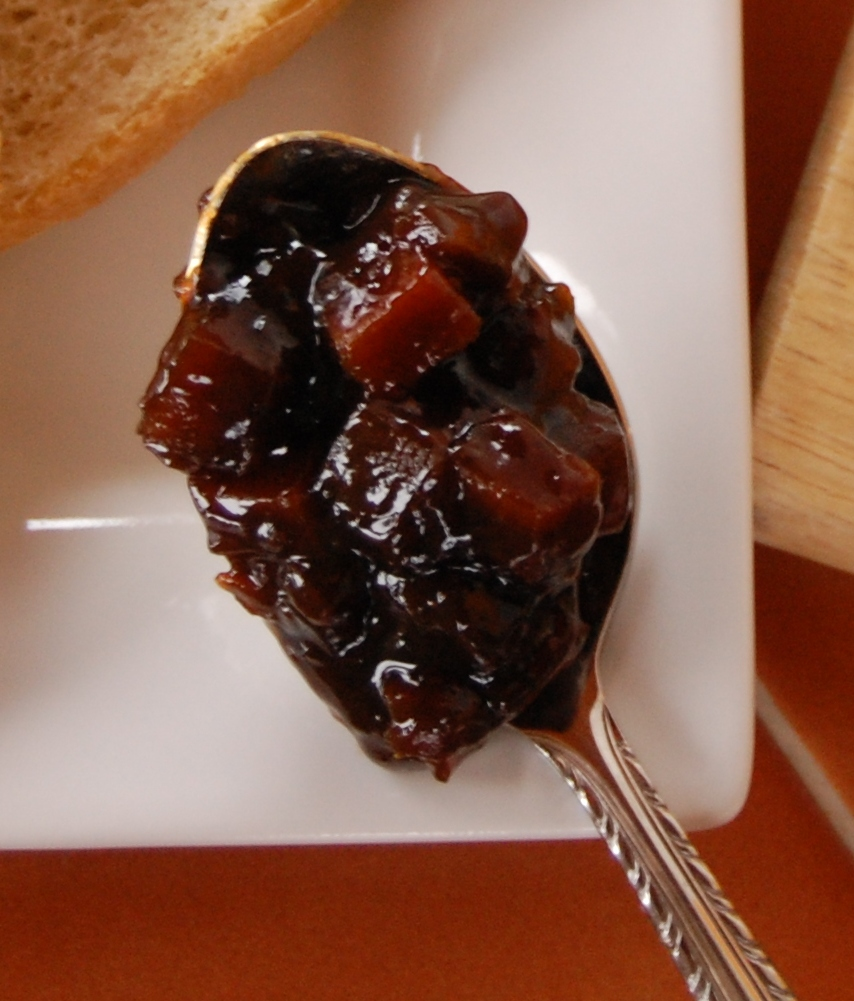
A close-up view of Branston Pickle

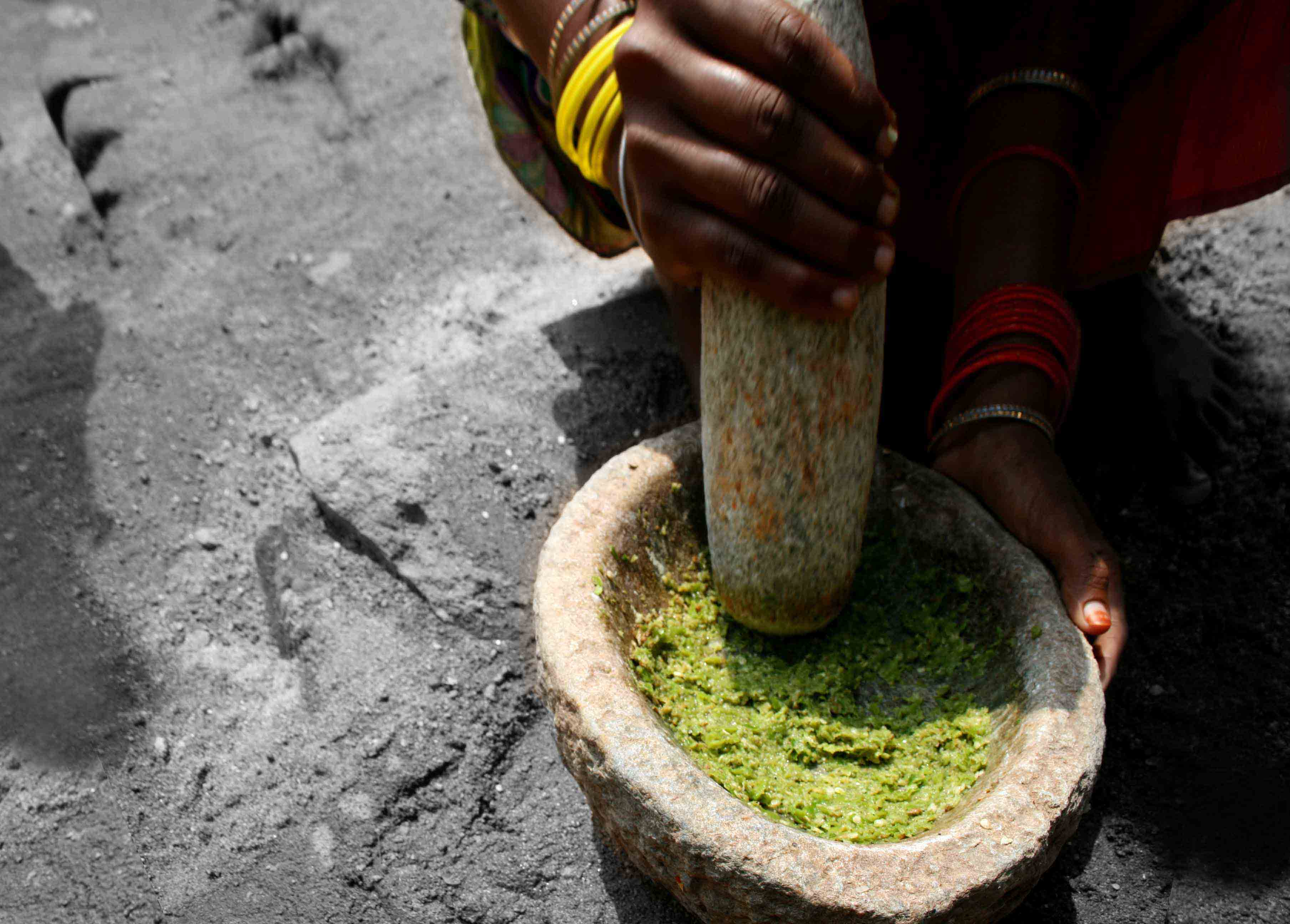
Chutney being hand-made

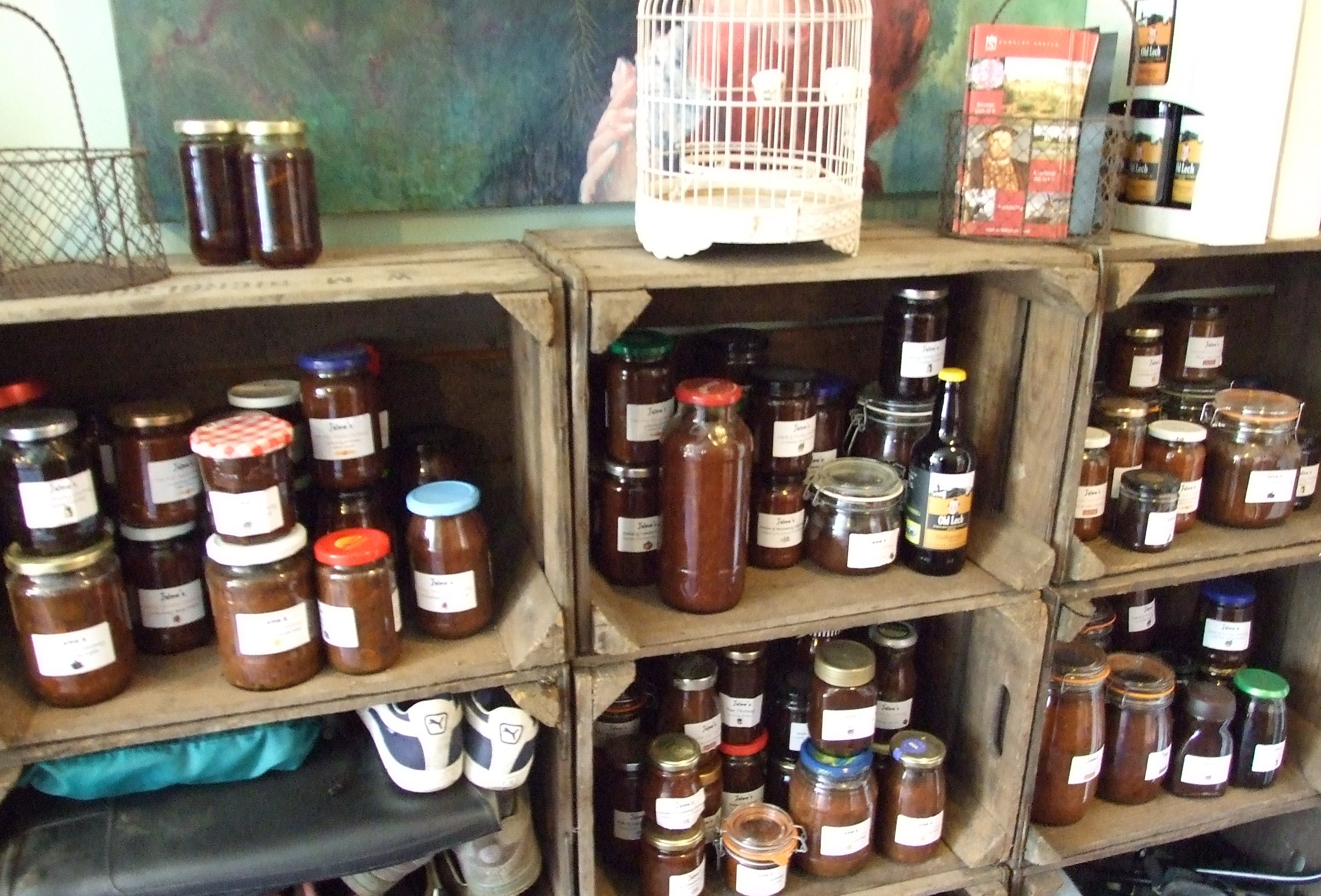
Various jarred chutneys

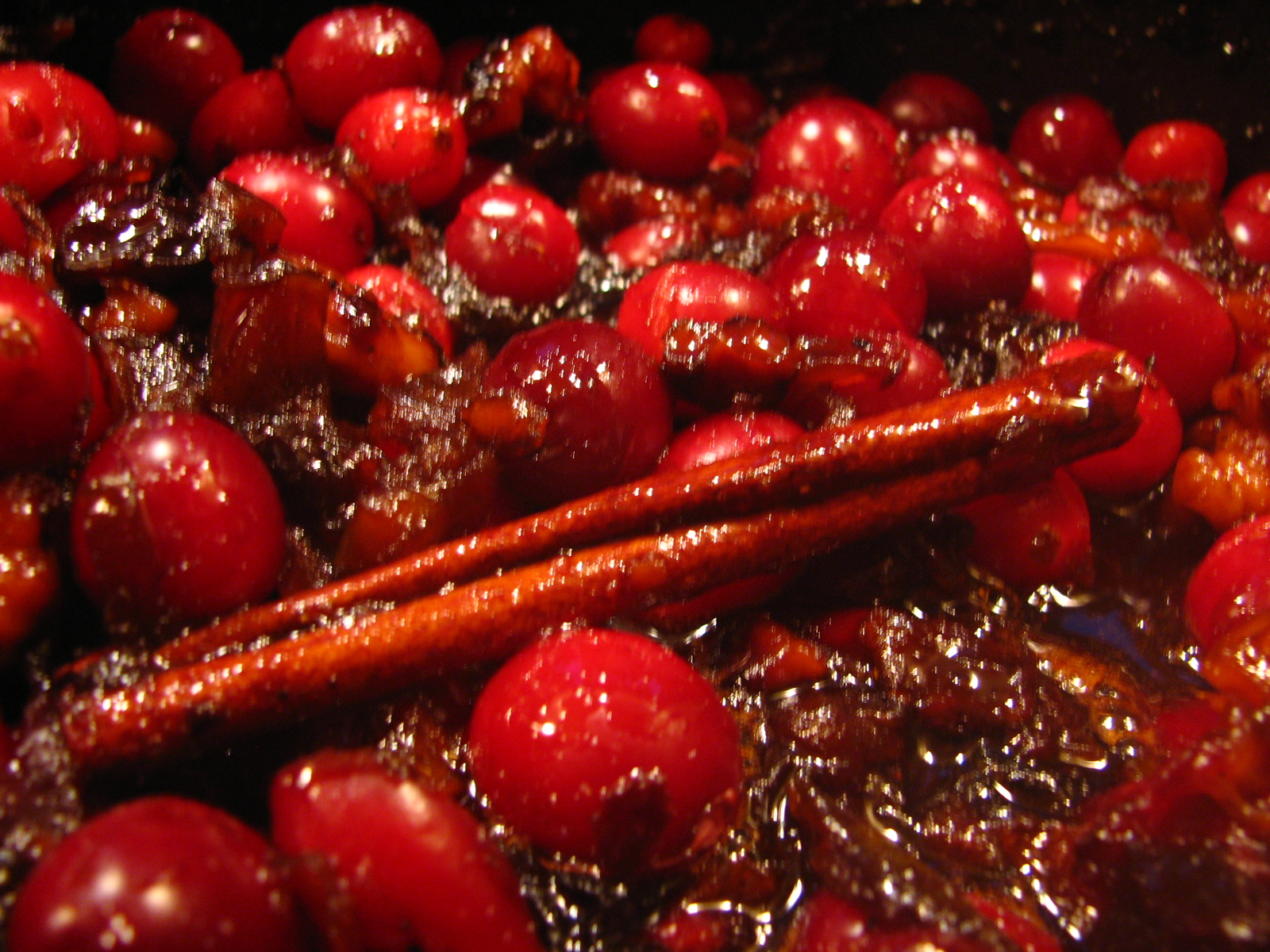
Close-up view of a cranberry chutney

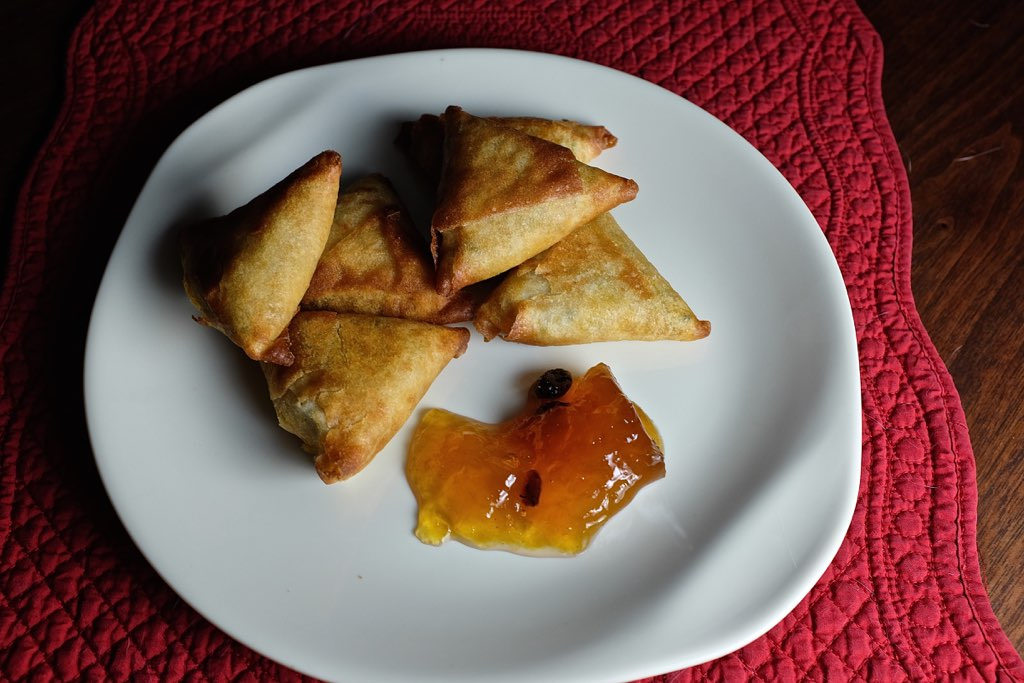
Major Grey's Chutney and vegetable samosas

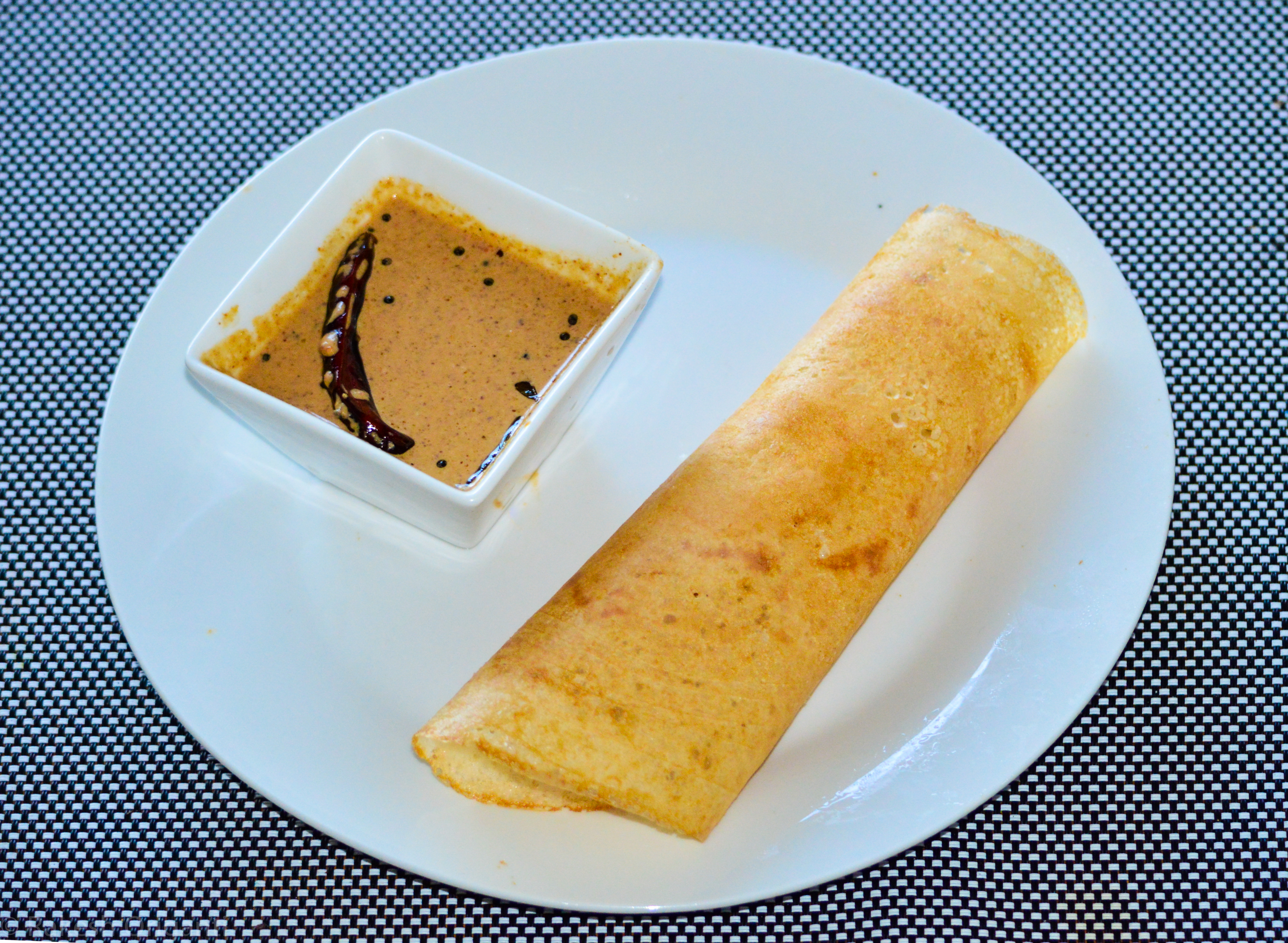
Peanut chutney (top) with a dosa

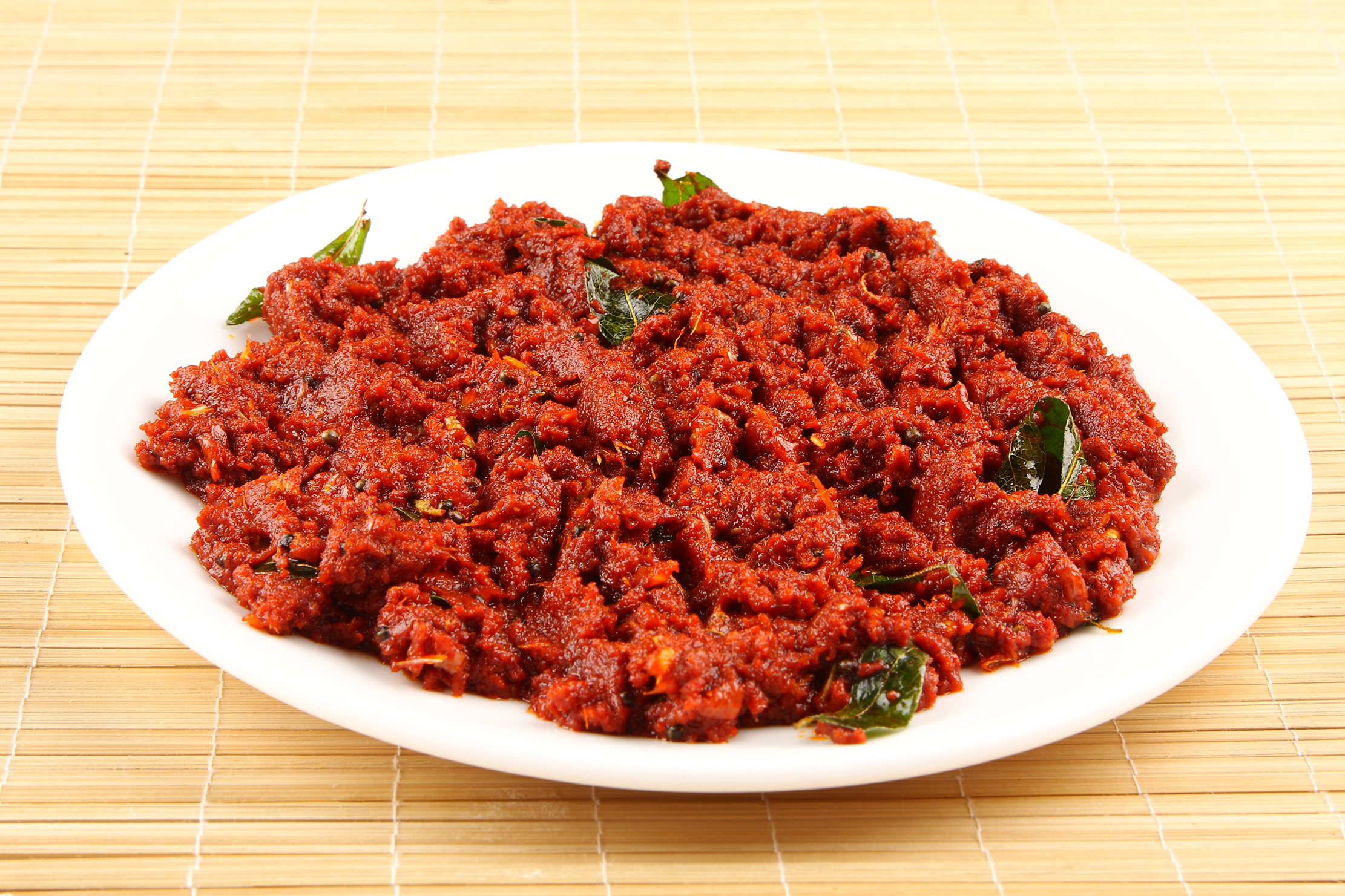
Homemade tomato chutney

Smoked Dry Fish and Tomato Chutney

== See also ==
- Anglo-Indian cuisine – Cuisine originated in the British Raj
- Chow-chow – Pickled relish
- List of ancient dishes
- List of condiments
- List of Indian condiments
- List of Indian pickles
- List of Pakistani condiments
- List of pickled foods
- Piccalilli – British relish of chopped pickled vegetables and spices
- South Asian pickles – Pickled varieties of vegetable and fruit
