= Gongura =

Edible form of the roselle plant

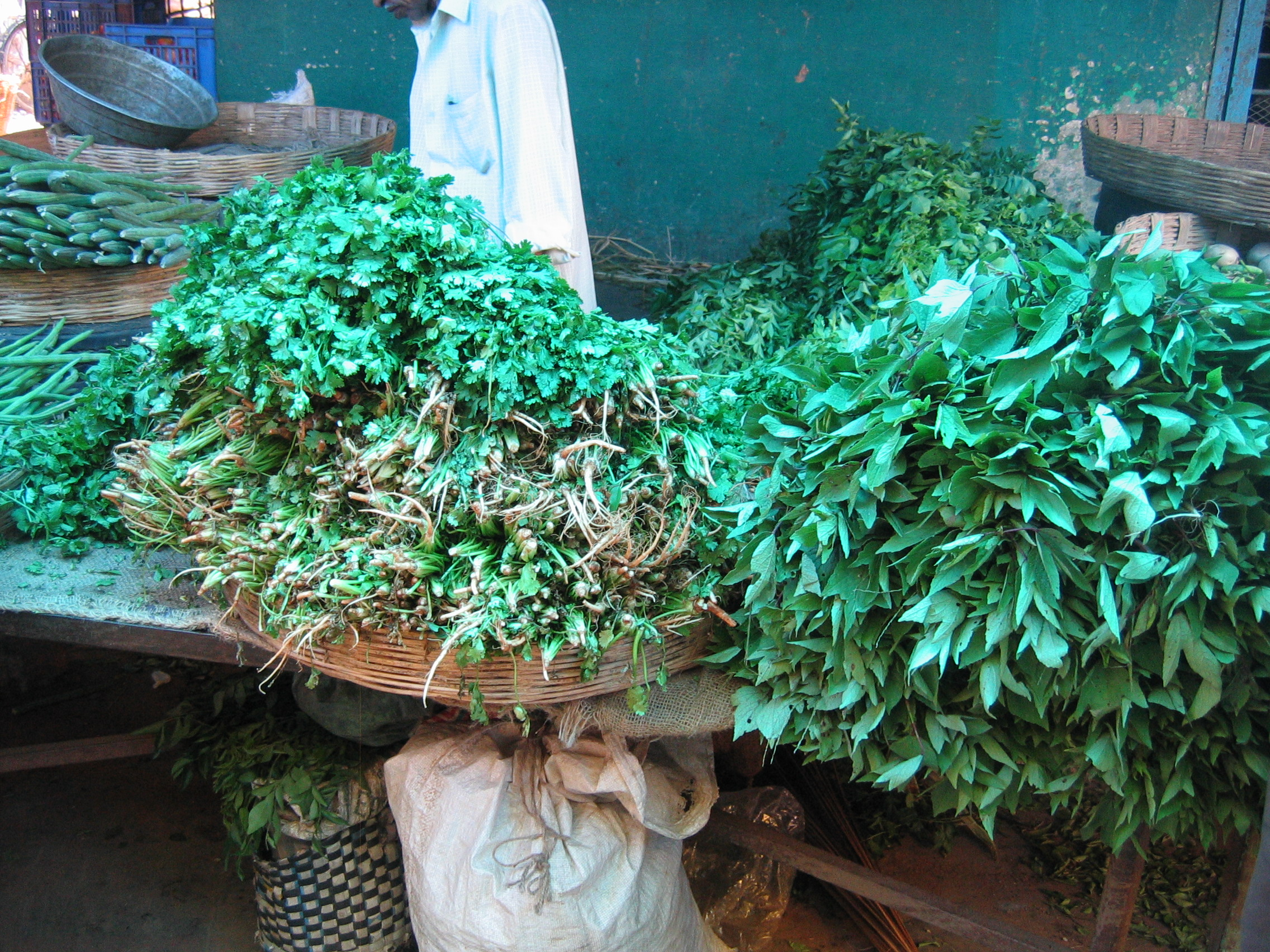
At a market in Guntur, India

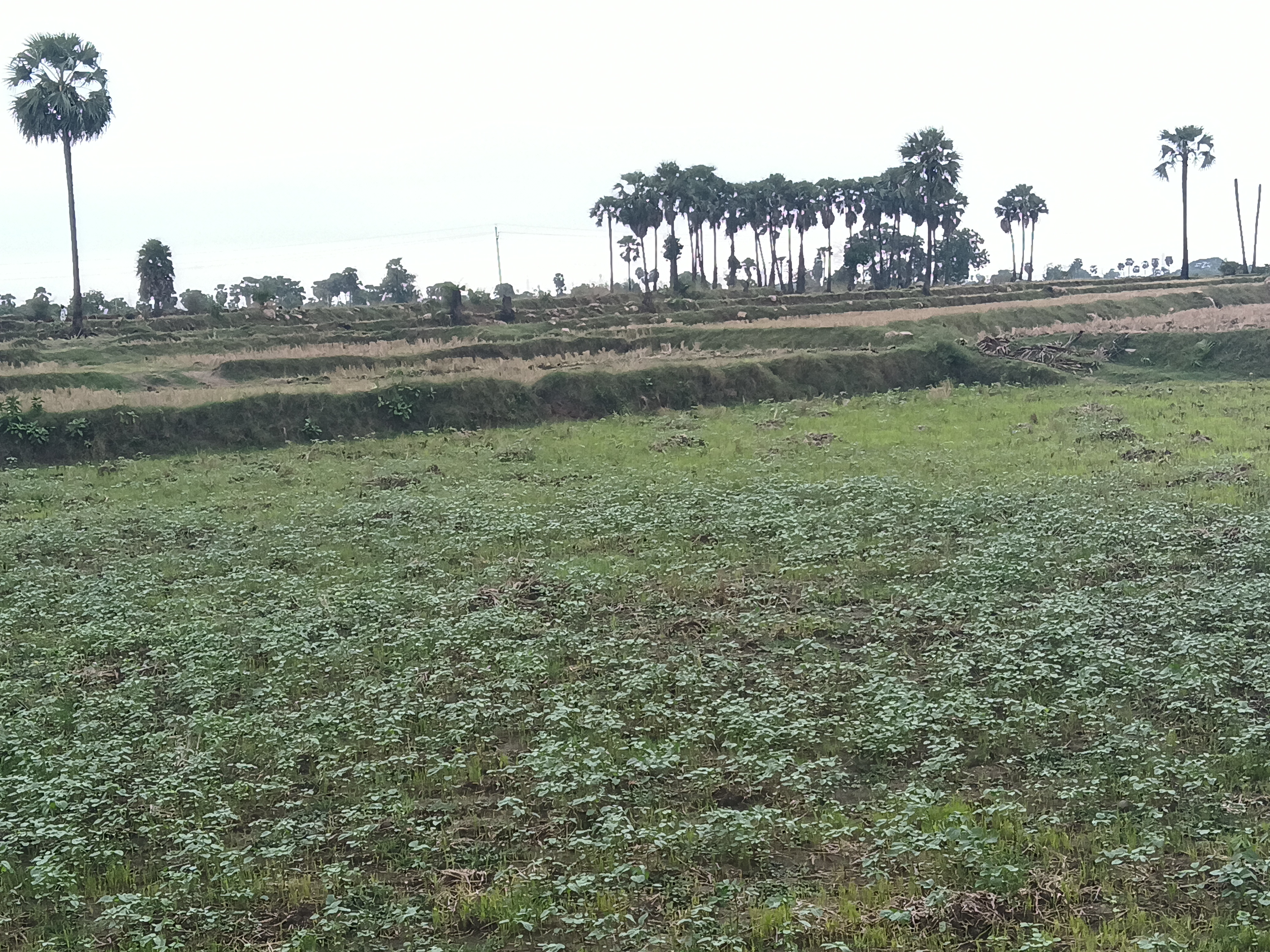
Gongura saplings

Gongura, puntikura, or gogaaku is a variety of the roselle plant grown for its edible leaves in India and in other countries like Fiji. These leaves are used in south-central Indian cuisine to impart a tart flavour. Gongura comes in two varieties, green stemmed leaf and red stemmed. The red stemmed variety is sourer than the green stemmed variety. Gongura is a rich source of iron, vitamins, folic acid and anti-oxidants essential for human nutrition.

== Description ==
Gongura pacchadi, a form of chutney or relish, is a quintessential part of Andhra cuisine. While it has many culinary uses, the most popular version is the pickled form. Although Gongura is widely consumed in homes all over Andhra Pradesh, Gongura is more popular in hotels, restaurants, eateries and food joints. It is also grown in Karnataka, Odisha, Telangana, Maharashtra, Tripura, Arunachal Pradesh (north east region of India) and some parts of Chittagong Hill Tracts region in Bangladesh (which is mainly a tribal people region). It is a popular green vegetable in Chakma community and it is known as "Aamelli". Similarly, Gongura is popular in Tamil Nadu as well, and is called pulichakeerai (புளிச்சைக் கீரை) in Tamil. In Odisha it's known as ଗୋରକୁରା (gorkura) or ଖଟା ପାଳଙ୍ଗ (khata palangaw). In Kerala it is called മത്തിപ്പുളി (Mathippuli), മീൻപുളി (Meenpuli) or പുളിവെണ്ട (Pulivenda). It is popular in North and Central Karnataka cuisines as "Pundi Palle/Punde sappu (ಪುಂಡಿ ಪಲ್ಲೆ/ಪುಂಡೆ ಸೊಪ್ಪು)", and is regularly eaten with Jollad (Jowar) rotti. The famous combination with pulichakeerai is Ragi Kali/Ragi Mudde, which once used to be a regular food for the people in villages (since these items are easily available in agricultural forms). In Marathi, it is called Ambaadi (अंबाडी). And is specially prepared to a stew and served to goddess Mahalakshmi/Gauri during the annual festival of Mahalakshmi which falls on three days in between the ten days Ganesha Chaturthi festival in Maharashtra. It is known as Pitwaa in Hindi, Kotrum in Jharkhand, Mestapat in Bengali, Amaari in Chhattisgarhi, Pandi/Pundi SOPPU in Kannada, Anthur in Mizo, Sougri in Manipuri, Sankokda in Punjabi, Aamelli in Chakma, Mwitha in Bodo, Kenaf Leaves in English, and Chin Baung in Burmese. . It is a summer crop, and the hotter the place, the sourer the leaf gets.

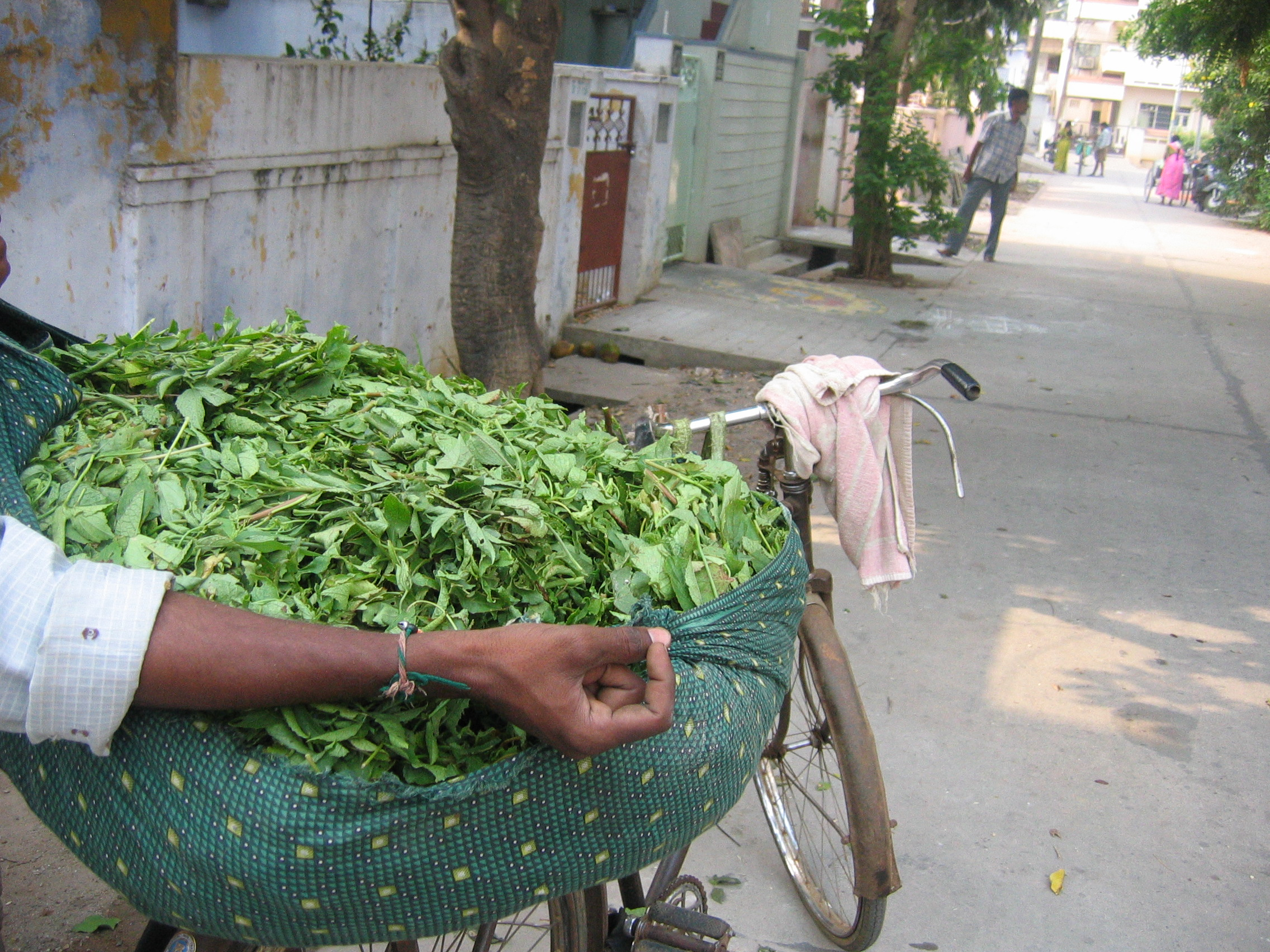
Sold on a street in Andhra Pradesh

Gongura is popular in the state of Andhra Pradesh, Karnataka, Manipur, Tripura and also Mizoram. A baby gongura leaf is a full leaf. As the leaf grows older, the leaf splits into four or more parts.

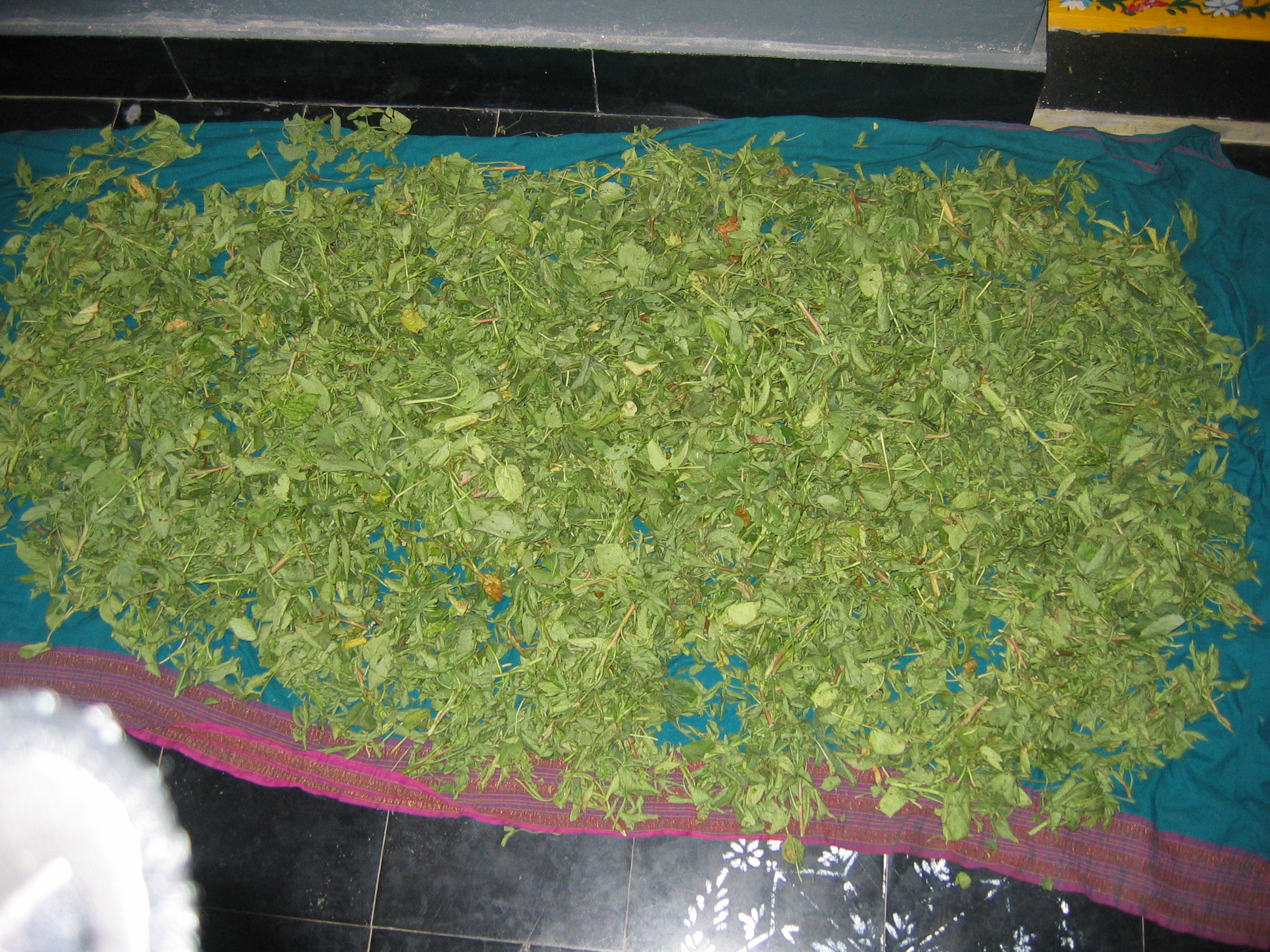
Drying gongura for pickle

Other well known recipes made with gongura as the main ingredient are gongura pappu (lentils), gongura mamsam (goat/mutton) and gongura royyalu (shrimp). In recent times, gongura chicken is also being served in restaurants. Gongura and calabash is extremely popular with the Telugu community in South Africa. It is also eaten by Acholi and Lango people in northern Uganda, where it is known as malakwang.

In the Bodo community of Assam too, 'Gongura' called as 'Mwitha' is taken very frequently, it is prepared as curry with pork, 'Mwitha-Oma', with pond fish as 'Mwitha-na' with prawns as 'Mwitha-nathur'. The leaves have a sour taste and slippery texture which is known to blend easily with non-veg items. The Bodo community believes that intake of sour helps in fighting the scorching summer heat and prevents illness.

== See also ==
- Roselle (plant), for medicinal uses
- Sorrel, sour leaf in European cuisine
