= Bhel =

Bhel or BHEL may refer to:

- Aegle marmelos, a fruit tree native to India
- Bhel puri, or bhelpuri, a type of chaat (snack food)
- Chinese bhel, an Indian noodle dish, and street food variant of the chop suey, popular in Mumbai, India
- Bharat Heavy Electricals Limited (BHEL), engineering and manufacturing enterprise in India

== See also ==
- Bhel township (disambiguation)
