= Bhel puri =

Indian snack

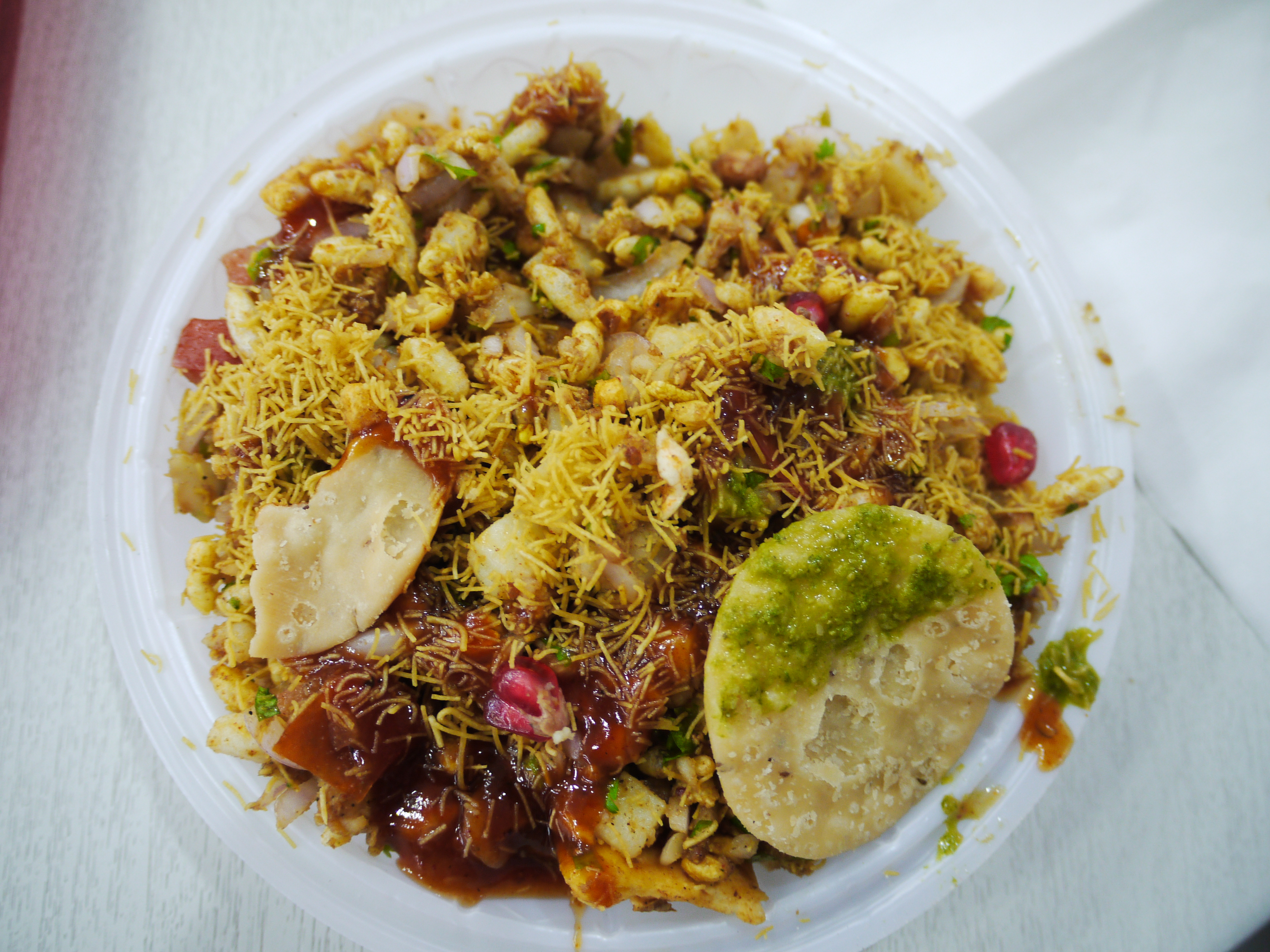
- Bhel puri
- Type: Chaat, farsan, salad
- Place of origin: Mumbai
- Associated cuisine: Gujarati cuisine
- Created by: Vithal Bhelwala (claimed)
- Main ingredients: Puffed rice, sev, papri, chutney
- Ingredients generally used: Potato, onion, etc.
- Variations: Jhalmuri; masala puri; churumuri
- Similar dishes: Panipuri; sev puri

Bhel puri (also bhelpuri, bhel poori, or simply bhel) is a savoury snack and a type of chaat, commonly served as street food. It is made of puffed rice, crunchy puris, and sev, which are layered with ingredients such as potato and onion and topped with chutneys—typically a coriander leaf chutney and a tangy tamarind chutney. Combining as many as fifteen ingredients, it incorporates contrasting textures and flavours. Bhel puri is originally from Mumbai and is rooted in Gujarati cuisine. Many similar versions of puffed rice snacks exist across India, including jhalmuri, masala puri, and churumuri.

Bhel puri is the most popular street food in Mumbai, popular on the city's beaches, and is also served at restaurants. Its origin is disputed. Bhel puri may have been invented by Gujarati migrants in Mumbai as an adaptation of North Indian chaats. Among other theories on the snack's origin, Mumbai's Vithal restaurant (established 1875) claims to have invented the dish. It began being sold as street food by Uttar Pradeshi migrants, while Gujaratis and other communities in Mumbai created variations. By the mid-twentieth century, it was a popular dish among all of the city's ethnic groups. Bhel puri is a popular street food in many parts of India, including in Kolkata; it is also served by Indian restaurants in other countries.

== Description ==
Bhel puri has a base of puffed rice, papri (thin, crispy puris), and sev (thin, deep fried pieces of flour), layered with ingredients such as boiled potatoes and chopped onions, and topped with chutney. Various vendors have different recipes, using different proportions of these common ingredients. It is typically made with two chutneys: a spicy, tangy tamarind chutney (made with dates and jaggery) and a coriander leaf chutney (made with mint, chilli, and peanuts). A red garlic chutney may additionally be used. Other ingredients used include coriander leaf, tomato, fried lentils, nuts, and spices such as chilli, cumin, and salt. In Mumbai, bhel puri commonly includes raw mango.

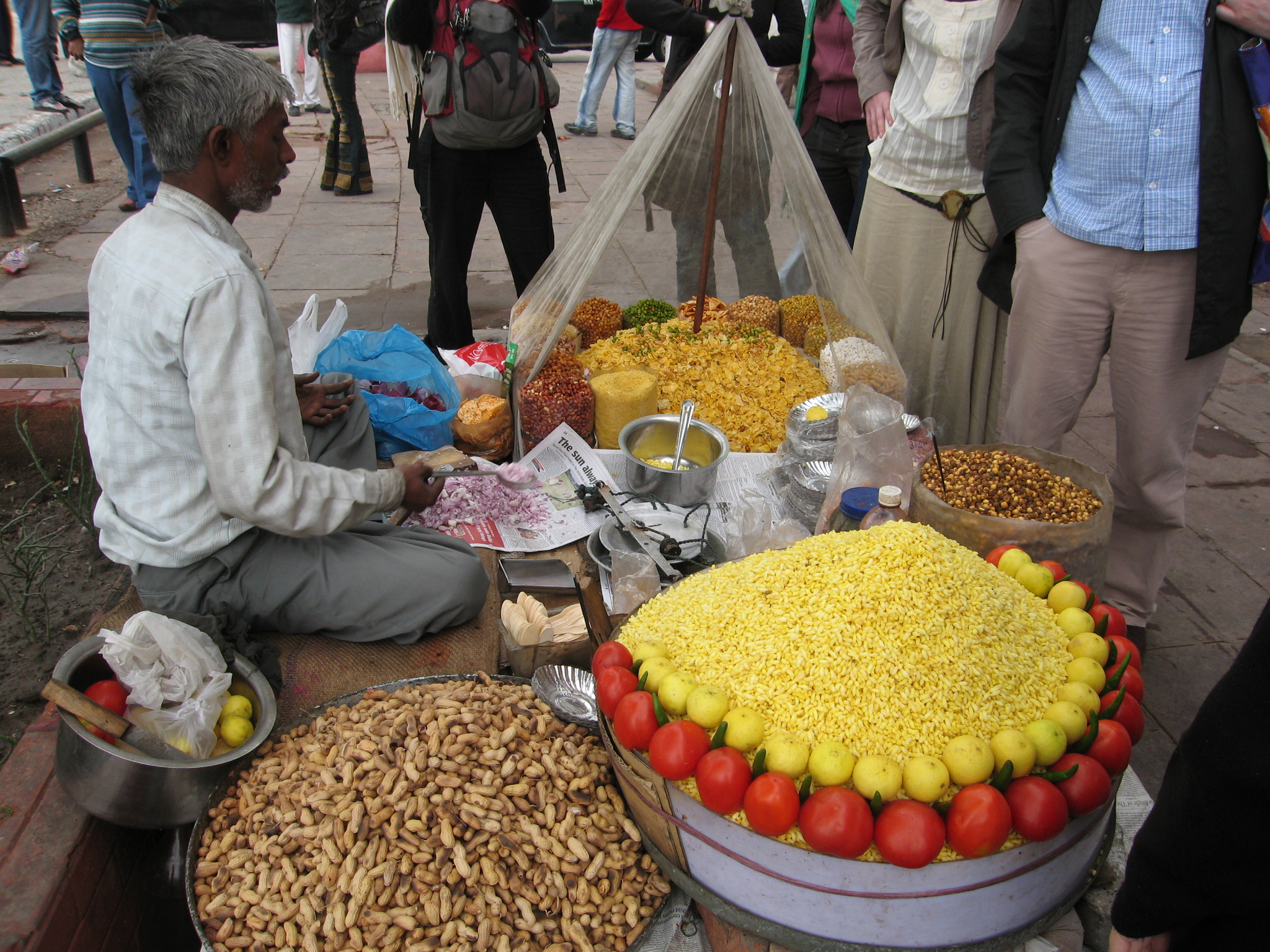
Bhel puri vendors mix ingredients one at a time.

Bhel puri is a type of chaat, or savoury snack. Like other chaats, it uses deep fried ingredients; however, it does not use dahi, and it may have as many as fifteen basic components, unlike typical chaats with only two or three. Bhel puri has a balance of sweet, tart, and spicy flavours, as well as different textures; the dish is prepared by adding one ingredient at a time to preserve each texture. According to food writer Vir Sanghvi, the texture relies on precise timing and proportion, and the complexity of the texture is not typical of Indian cuisine. Some people classify bhel puri as a salad.

Bhel puri is a street food, usually eaten while standing; it is traditionally eaten by hand, using the papri to hold the food, although a spoon may be used. Vendors, known as bhelwallas, serve it on leaf plates or newsprint. Bhel puri is most commonly an evening snack. It is also served as a farsan, a category of afternoon tea snack in Gujarati cuisine. Bhel puri, like many street foods, is served raw, which is a risk factor for foodborne illness. Some studies have found high rates of bacteria such as E. coli in bhel puri. (Note: Studies have found bacteria in bhel puri from street vendors in Vadodara, Gujarat, in 2005; Bangalore in 2010; and Buldhana District, Maharashtra, in 2012.)

Ingredients similar to bhel puri are also used for the chaats panipuri, sev puri, and dahi puri, which are instead made with small, spherical puris and do not use puffed rice. Bhel puri is one of many snacks based on puffed rice; other versions exist in many parts of India, modified to suit local cuisines. The Bengali variant of bhel puri is called jhalmuri, which is made with mustard oil. Masala puri is another version, made with boiled peanuts. In the cuisine of Karnataka, a similar dish is churumuri (also called mandakki), which, unlike bhel puri, is mixed to order; a variant of mandakki called girmit also includes cooked ingredients. An Indo-Chinese chaat dish called Chinese bhel is based on bhel puri and uses noodles, scallions, and chilli sauce.

== History ==
=== Origin ===
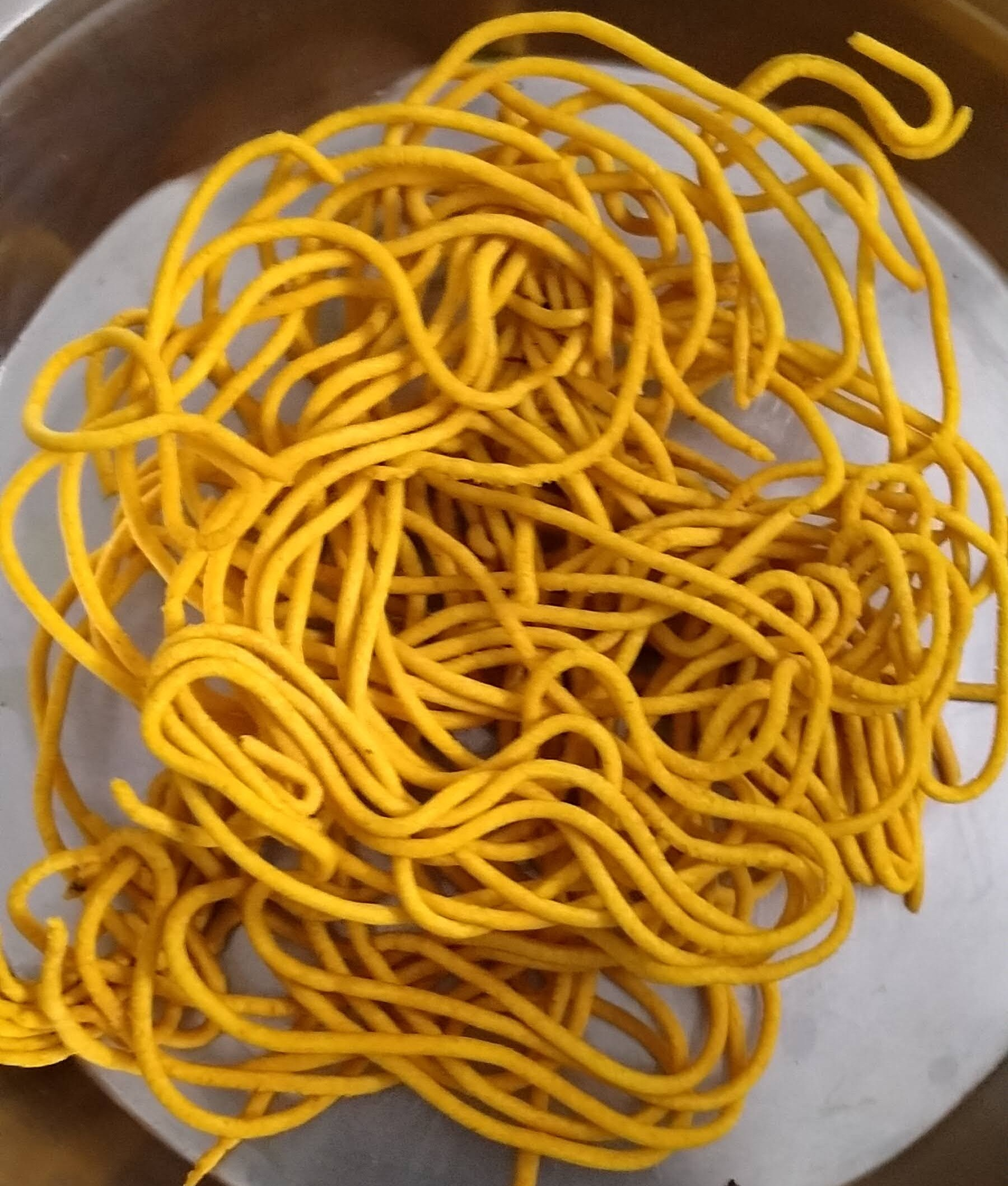
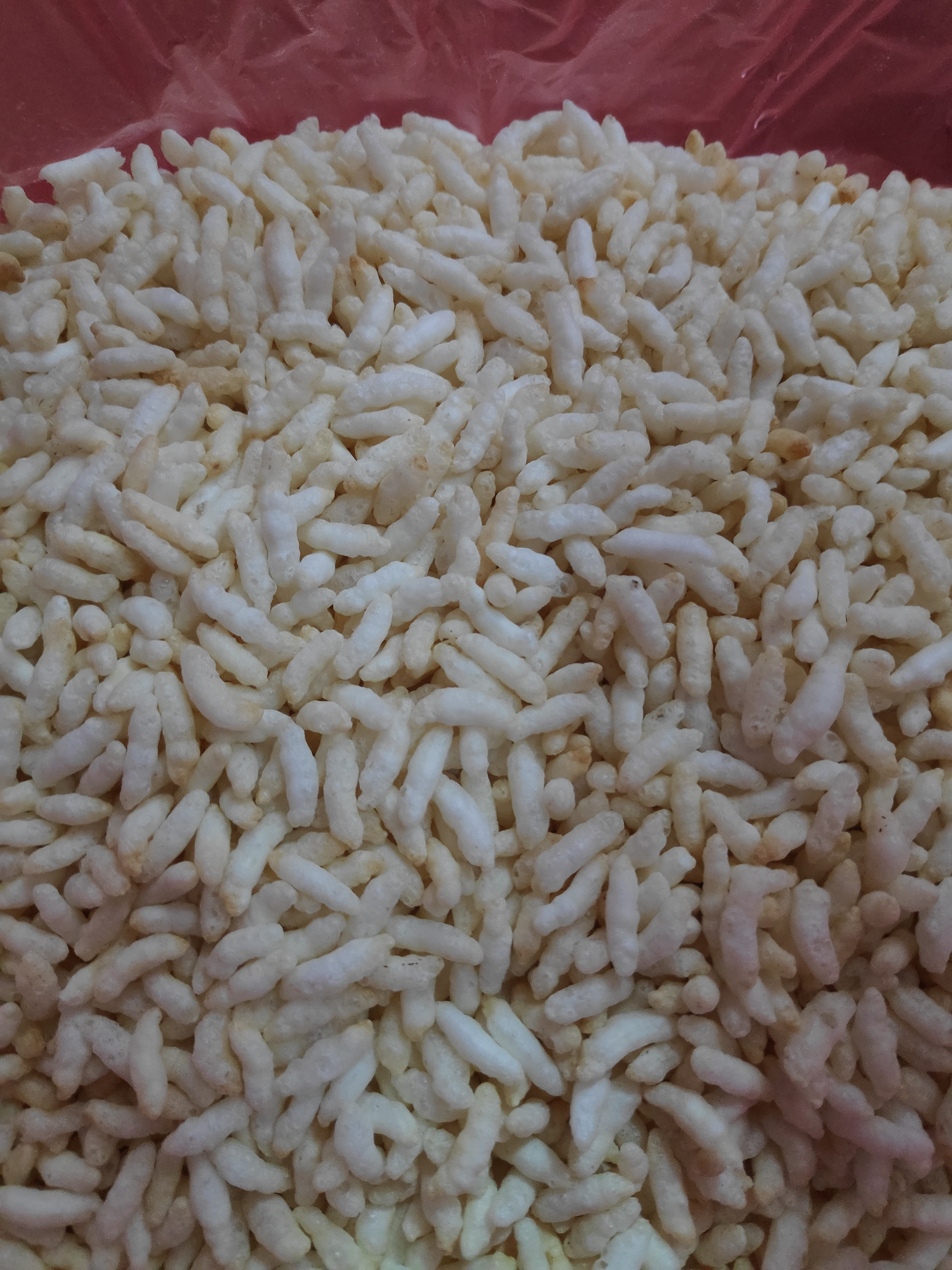
Sev and puffed rice are ingredients used in Gujarati cuisine.

Sanghvi writes that, while the category of chaats originated in North Indian cuisine—particularly that of Uttar Pradesh—bhel puri is generally said to have originated in the cuisine of Mumbai. Rooted in both Uttar Pradeshi chaat and Gujarati foods, it is considered a Gujarati dish. (Note: Sanghvi states that bhel is "probably" a Gujarati dish, despite being from Mumbai, Maharashtra, considering it an inconsequential distinction as Maharashtra and Gujarat had no official division before 1960.) Sanghvi describes it as the only chaat dish that did not originate in North India. According to food writer Vikram Doctor, it is based on chaat as well as the category of puffed rice snacks, which is from East and South India. According to Sanghvi, the ingredients like sev and puffed rice are of Gujarati origin, and, according to food writer Kunal Vijaykar, the use of these ingredients is rooted in the Gujarati farsan. Anthropologist Harris Solomon writes, "bhel puri has a lineage connected to groups ranging from Gujaratis to others as far away as West Bengal." The term bhel puri comes from Hindi bhel, which means 'mixture'.

The exact origin of bhel puri is disputed. A restaurant called Vithal, near the Victoria Terminus station in Mumbai, was founded in 1875 and has claimed to have invented bhel puri. Vithal is widely credited with the dish's invention, but, according to Vijaykar, its claim is apocryphal. A legend says the dish originated during the rule of seventeenth-century Maratha emperor Shivaji, who wanted a snack to be made and eaten quickly by soldiers before battle. Another theory is that it was invented on Mumbai's Chowpatty Beach. According to Sanghvi, bhel puri was conceived by the city's Gujarati community, who made it by adding complex flavours to the simple North Indian chaat. The earliest known recorded recipe for bhel puri is from the British colonial era, by William Harold, a cook sent by the British Army to Bombay to research the dish so it could be served by army canteens.

According to Sanghvi, Uttar Pradheshi chaat vendors in Mumbai began selling bhel puri soon after the dish's creation. Gujarati housewives soon created several homemade versions of the dish, with fewer spices than modern bhel puri, and using ingredients such as date chutney rather than tamarind. Many of Mumbai's communities made their own variations.

=== Widespread popularity ===
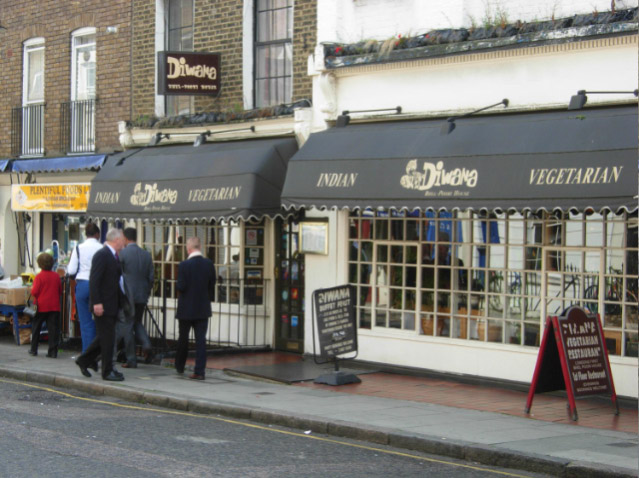
Diwana Bhel Poori House introduced the dish to London.

In the 1960s and 1970s, many of Mumbai's bhel puri vendors were from Uttar Pradesh. Thus, Mumbaikars address bhel puri vendors as bhaiyya, a term used for North Indian men. Mumbai at the time was a city with distinct ethnic populations, and bhel puri was popular among all ethnic groups. It became a popular street food on the city's beaches and was also served at restaurants. Mumbai's Udipi restaurants—such as Shetty, owned by migrants from Mangalore—made a version of the dish with heavy use of lemon, and another popular version was made by Sindhi people at the Kailash Parbat Chaat House in the Colaba neighbourhood.

The chaat restaurant Swati was established in the early 1960s by Gujarati migrants in Mumbai and quickly gained popularity. Its version of bhel puri became known as the true version, and bhel puri became more associated with Gujaratis than Uttar Pradeshis. Bhel puri was introduced to London by Jayant Shah, an immigrant from Mumbai who established the restaurant Diwana Bhel Poori House in 1972, as he felt nostalgic for the dish.

Sanghvi wrote in 2020 that Mumbaikars no longer saw bhel puri as the city's favourite dish, instead seeing it as similar to panipuri, while more modern, mass-produced dishes, such as vada pav and pav bhaji, had become more emblematic of the city.

== Consumption ==
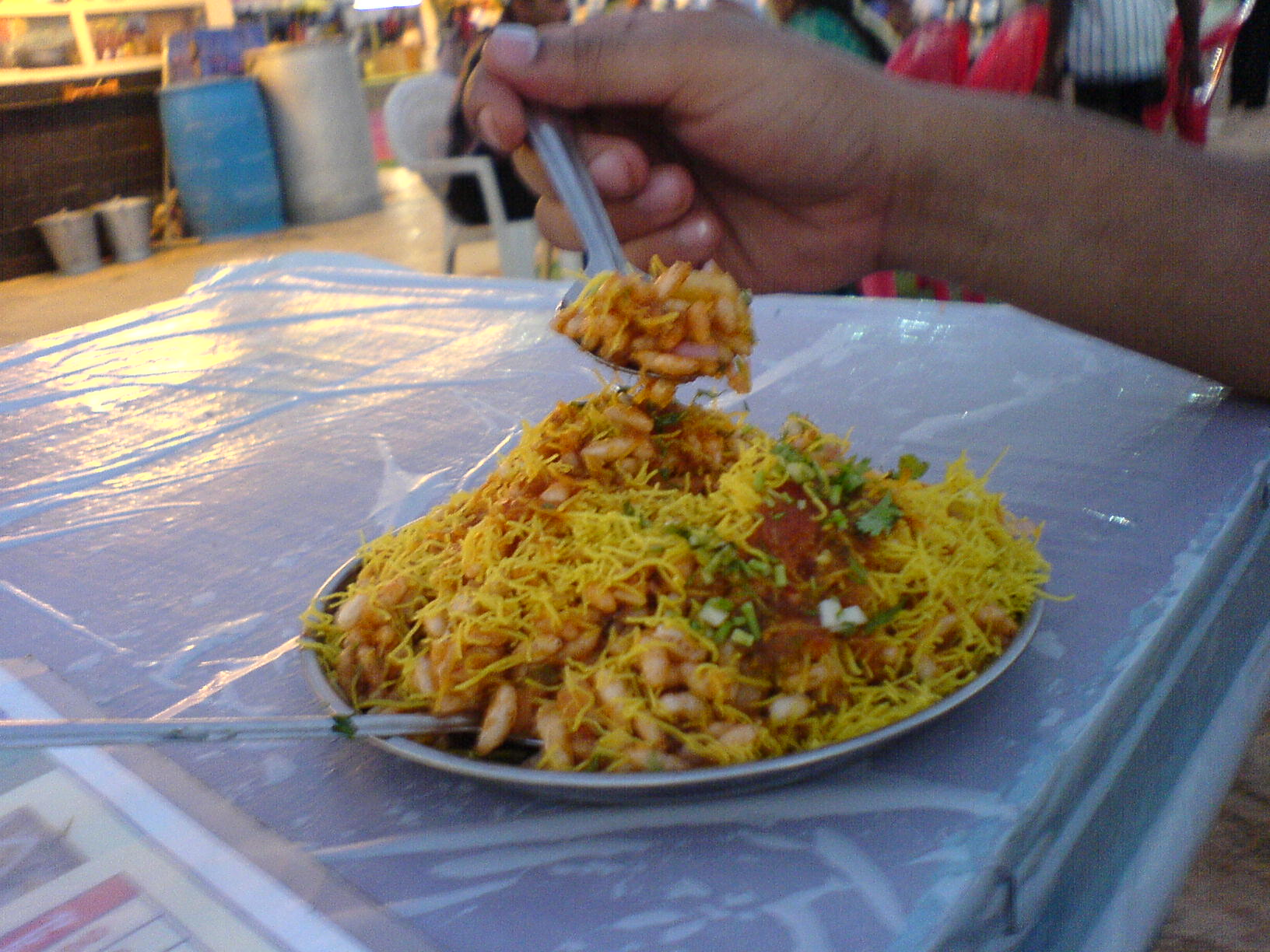
Bhel puri served as street food at Juhu Beach, Mumbai

Bhel puri is the most common dish in the street food of Mumbai. It is available across the city from street vendors and restaurants. It is particularly popular on the beaches of Mumbai, such as Chowpatty or Juhu. Many vendors in the city attract followings. It has been considered as the city's favourite street food dish; food writer Madhur Jaffrey described the dish's popularity:

But there is one equalizer in Bombay to which everyone succumbs—Parsi millionaires, movie stars and taxi drivers alike—and that is bhel-poori. Bhel-poori is a snack. The place to have it is Chowpatty Beach, the time sundown, when most of Bombay like to promenade by the sea to 'eat the air'.

— Madhur Jaffrey's Flavours of India (1995)

Like other Mumbai street foods, bhel puri has spread to most parts of India. In both urban and rural areas, the snack is culturally associated with street vendors at busy locations such as beaches and marketplaces. It is a popular street food in Kolkata. The area of the city around Lake Kalibari has two popular bhel puri stalls, Khirkiwala (since the 1930s) and Bhelwala (since 1983), and is known for a version called Lake bhelpuri, which contains dhokla. Street food vendors in Kolkata also serve bhel puri on bread, known as "bhelpuri toast". In the United States, Indian restaurants commonly serve bhel puri as an appetizer, along with other street foods and other Western Indian dishes. It is also served at Indian snack shops in the country.

Supermarkets stock ready-to-eat packets of bhel puri and similar snacks like sev puri. The snack company Haldiram's sells a version of bhel puri, which it markets in Western India. Bhel mix is a product that includes puffed rice, papri, and sev, to be used as a base for bhel puri or as a snack on its own. Another product sold in grocery stores is bhel chutney, consisting of tamarind chutney with puffed rice and sev.

== See also ==
- Sev mamra
- Ghugni
