= Street food of Mumbai =

Food sold by street vendors in Mumbai, India

Street food of Mumbai is the food sold by hawkers from portable market stalls in Mumbai. Although street food is common all over India, Mumbai is known for its street food and is a strong characteristic of the city. It has this reputation because people from all economic classes eat on the roadside almost round the clock, and it is sometimes felt that the taste of street food is better than that of restaurants in the city. Street food vendors are credited by some for developing the city's food culture. Street food is relatively inexpensive as compared to restaurants, and vendors tend to be clustered around crowded areas such as colleges and railway stations. Mumbai's street food ranked No.10 in the Time Out's World's Best Street Food Cities 2026 list. Mumbai was amongst 3 Indian cities which made it to the list, the other two being Jaipur at No.15 and Delhi at No. 19.

== Variety ==
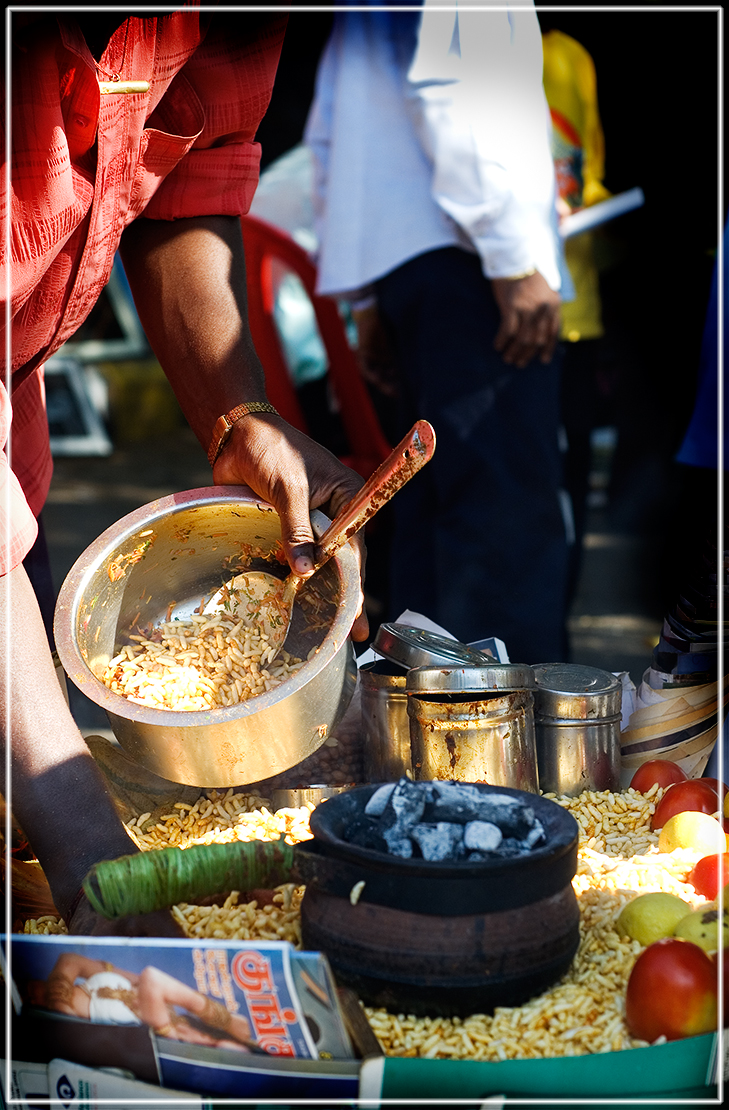
A street vendor uses his arm, instead of a spoon located in the other bowl, to prepare Bhel puri in Mumbai, Maharashtra

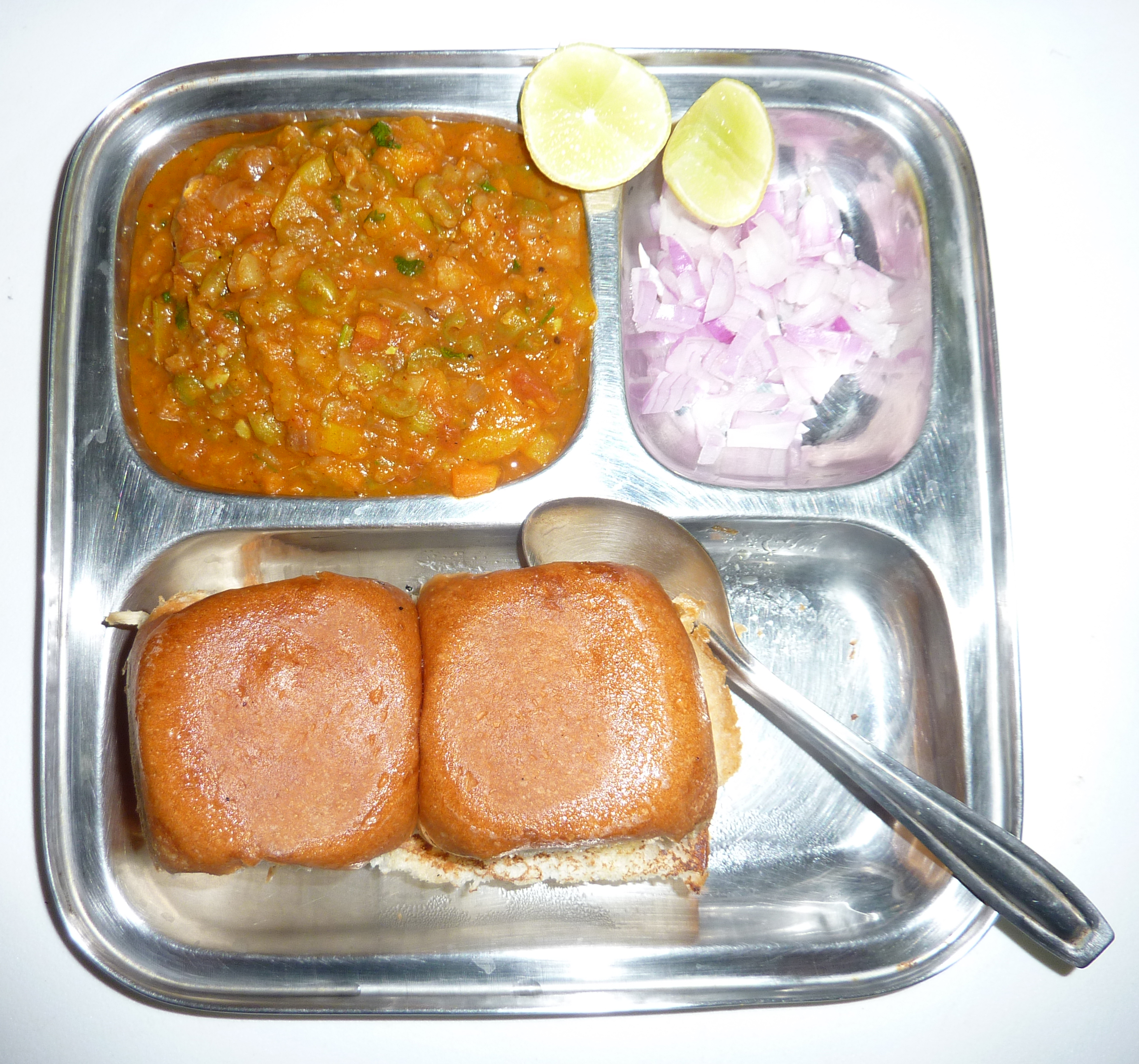
Pav bhaji

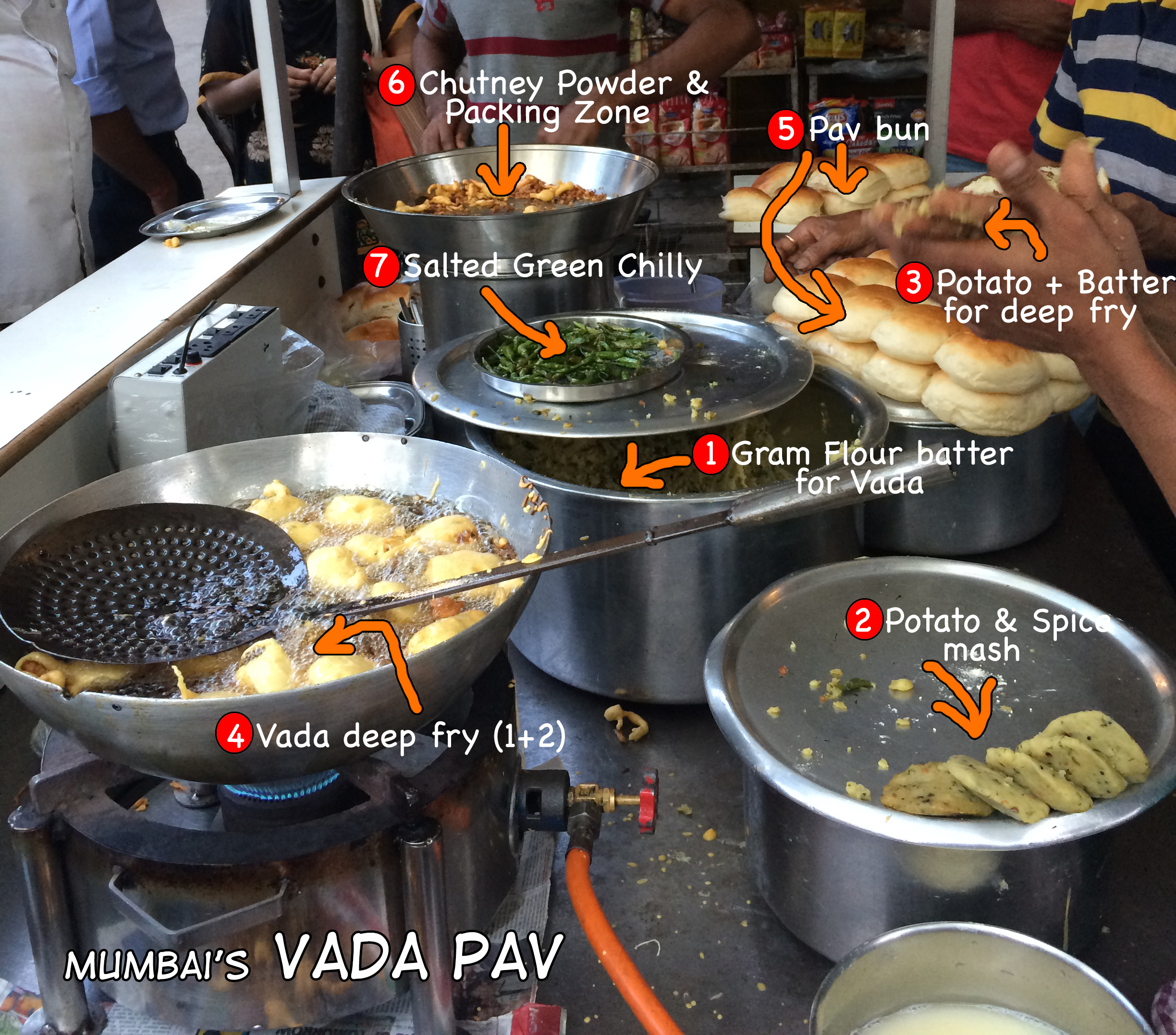
Mumbai Vada pav, the most popular Mumbai food

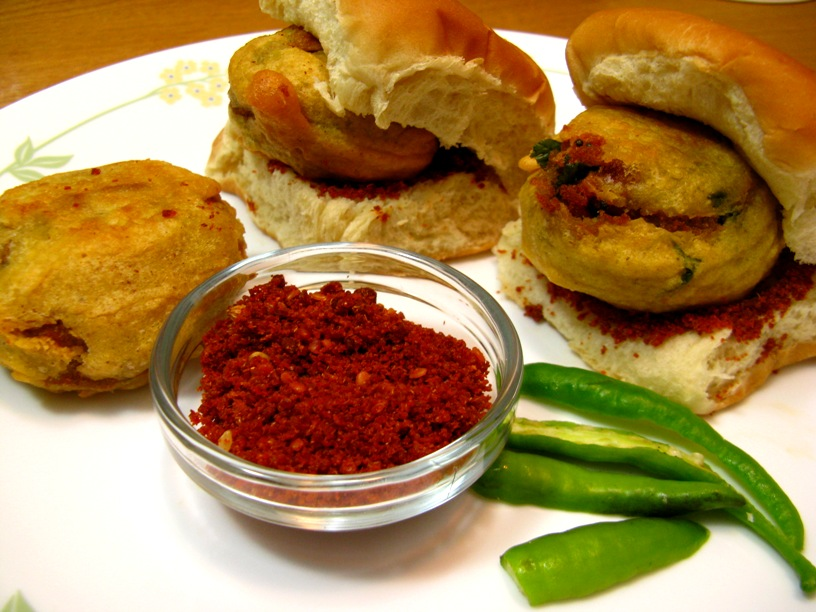
Vada pav

Mumbai, being the capital (and the largest urban area) of Maharashtra, is dominated by Maharashtrian food. Vada pav is noted as the most popular street food in Mumbai. A sandwich form of Eggs Kejriwal is also a very common snack or breakfast street food. Other noted street foods in Mumbai include Dabeli, Panipuri, Bhel puri, Sev puri, Dahipuri, Sandwiches, Ragda pattice, Pav bhaji, Chinese bhel, Khaman, Dhokla, Idli, and Dosa, all of which are vegetarian.

In terms of non-vegetarian offerings, Omelette, Kebab, and fish are found on Mumbai streets. The amount and of variety of street food is attributed to the cosmopolitan culture of the city. In the 1980s, Indianised Chinese food was an emerging trend on Mumbai streets. Other popular street food items include Misal pav (spicy curry made of sprouted moth beans, which is eaten with pav, an Indian bread roll typically a bun), and vegetable frankie (a popular and cheaper version of wraps and rolls).

Kulfi (frozen dairy dessert, similar to ice cream) and golah (Indian snow cone, sometimes served on a stick) are among the desserts and coolants that can be found.

Apart from snacks, Mumbai has several juice and milkshake bars on the roadside that offer a variety of juices and milkshakes. Fresh sugarcane juice vendors are synonymous with Mumbai roads and offer a cheap form of refreshment. Tea vendors cycle around the city, selling the beverage hot on the streets. Street vendors normally remain unaffected by general strike calls and do business all year round. Paan, a Betel preparation eaten as a mouth freshener post meals in India is also sold at Mumbai's roadside stalls.

== Areas and spread ==
Streets with a sizable cluster of street food stalls are known as Khau Galli locally, which means 'Food Alley' in Marathi. Girgaon Chowpatty beach is noted for its Bhel puri and kulfi. Street vendors at Nariman Point, one of the city's financial hubs, do brisk business during the lunch hour.

Mumbai's street food has made its way into the kitchens of restaurants in the city, including five star hotels. In fact, restaurants in various parts of the world have incorporated Mumbai's street food into their menu cards. Homegrown fast food companies that serve street food in Mumbai have been launched in recent years. Despite the many pros and cons of street food, it forms a daily diet of many office goers and college students in the city. Many Mumbaikars enjoy evening snacks on the roadside.

== Controversies ==
Some people avoid street food because of hygiene issues, however the larger public, irrespective of class enjoy Mumbai's street food. Restaurants and hotels have capitalised on this phenomenon by offering street food to their clientele. A large number of hawkers trade illegally, without mandatory permits from the local municipality, by bribing officials. Drives to evict hawkers are regularly held, though the hawkers return after a short period of time. Equipment and other goods seized from illegal hawkers are returned by the municipality after the hawker pays a fine. In 2007, the Supreme Court ruled in a case against illegal hawking by asking the municipality to demarcate 230 areas in the city as legal hawking zones, a number that was later increased to 1700 areas; this is still to be implemented. A news report in 2009 claimed that no hawking licenses had been issued in Mumbai for 20 years and that out of the estimated 250,000 hawkers in the city, only about 17,000 had a valid license.

A controversy emerged in 2011, when a muslim Panipuri vendor from Thane was filmed urinating into a container that was also used to serve the customers. The event led to a public uproar and a major political drama in the city; Shiv Sena and Maharashtra Navnirman Sena members again attacked North Indians, targeting the panipuri and bhelpuri sellers of Mumbai and Thane. The vendor was arrested, taken to court, fined and let off with a warning. After action against all panipuri vendors across the city by political parties, the vendor in question, who himself had been in the business for 15 years, chose to give up the trade altogether and take up a job with a private security agency.

== See also ==
- Culture of Mumbai
- Street food of Kolkata
- Street food of Chennai
- Indian fast food
- Indian cuisine
