= Jhalmuri =

Indian street snack

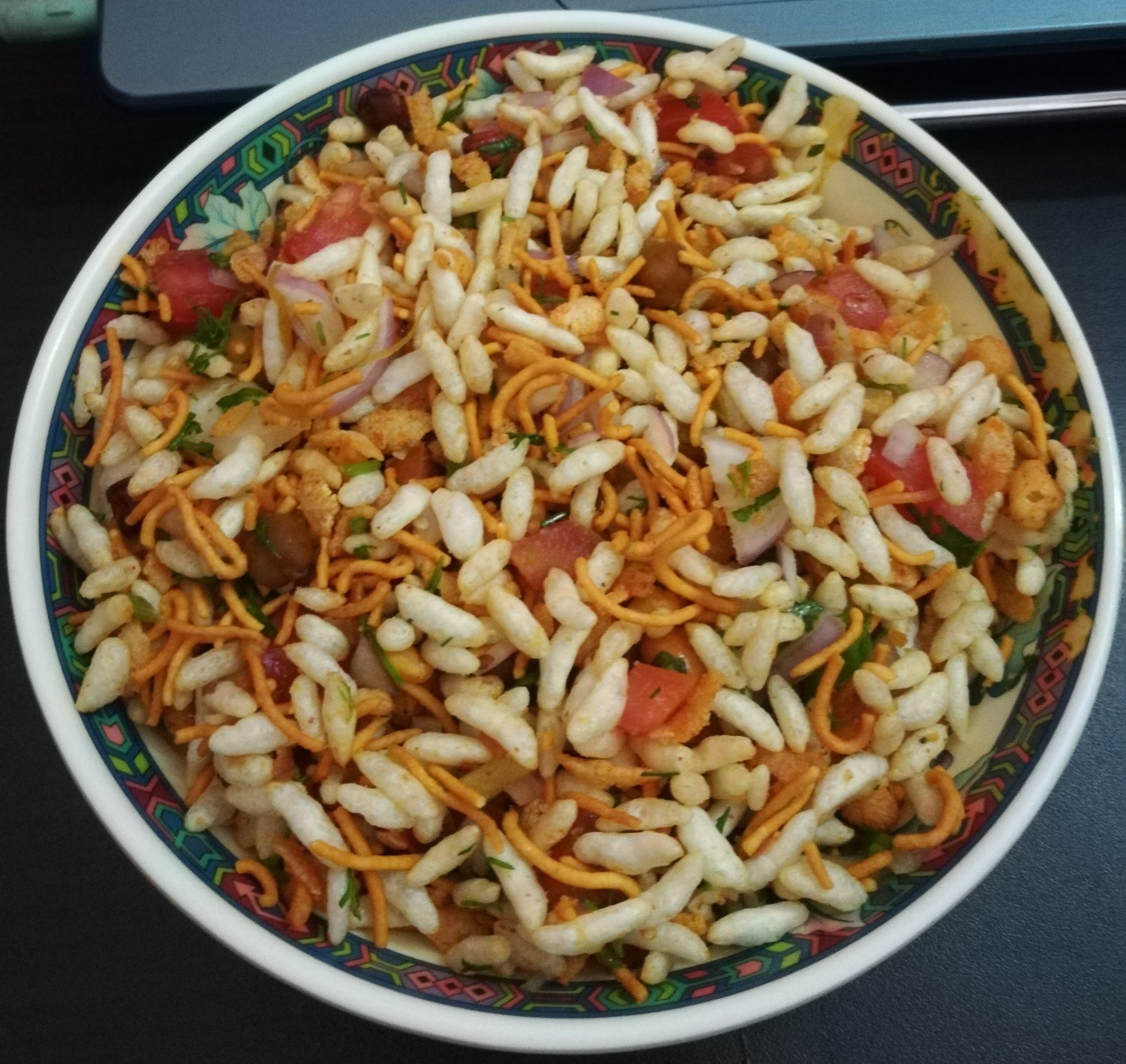
- Jhalmuri
- Type: snack
- Course: Hors d'oeuvre
- Place of origin: India
- Region or state: Bengal, Bihar, Odisha, eastern Uttar Pradesh, Tripura
- Associated cuisine: Bengali cuisine, Bihari cuisine, Odia cuisine, Bhojpuri cuisine
- Main ingredients: Muri, cucumber, chanachur, mustard oil, lemon, onion, chili, tomato, salt , coriander leaf, potato
- Similar dishes: Bhel puri

Jhalmuri (Bengali: ঝালমুড়ি, Odia: ଝାଲ ମୁଢ଼ି, Assamese: ঝল মুৰি, Bhojpuri: झाल मुरी, Hindi: झालमुड़ी) is a popular street snack in the Bengali, Bihari, Bhojpuri, Odia, Assamese and Tripuri cuisine of the Indian subcontinent, made of puffed rice and an assortment of Indian spices, vegetables, Bombay mix (chanachur) and mustard oil. It is popular in the Indian states of Bihar, West Bengal, Tripura, eastern Uttar Pradesh, and Odisha and in neighbouring Bangladesh. It became popular in London when a British chef named Angus Denoon tried this snack in Kolkata and started selling it on the streets of London. The popularity of Jhalmuri has also reached other western cities like New York City through the Bengali diaspora.

Ghoti Gorom (Bengali: ঘটি গরম) is another similar street snack food famous in West Bengal, Bangladesh and North East India. Ghoti gorom is very similar to such street foods like Jhal muri, bhel or dhal muri, similar in taste but does not have puffed rice or murmura. Ghoti gorom consists of sev or bhujia mixed with chanachur (a spicy mixture), chopped onions, green chilies, chopped raw mango slices, Biliti Amra (বিলিতি আমড়া), mustard oil, and various other spices.

Widely enjoyed for its spicy and tangy flavor, Jhalmuri is especially consumed in Kolkata, where it holds the status of a cultural staple and is often regarded as a symbol of the city's vibrant street food scene. It is considered by many to be part of Bengal's cultural heritage and is commonly found across cities and towns, sold by street vendors in paper cones or small bowls.

== See also ==
- Street food of Kolkata
- List of Indian dishes
- List of Bangladeshi dishes
- List of rice dishes
