= Sev mamra =

Indian snack

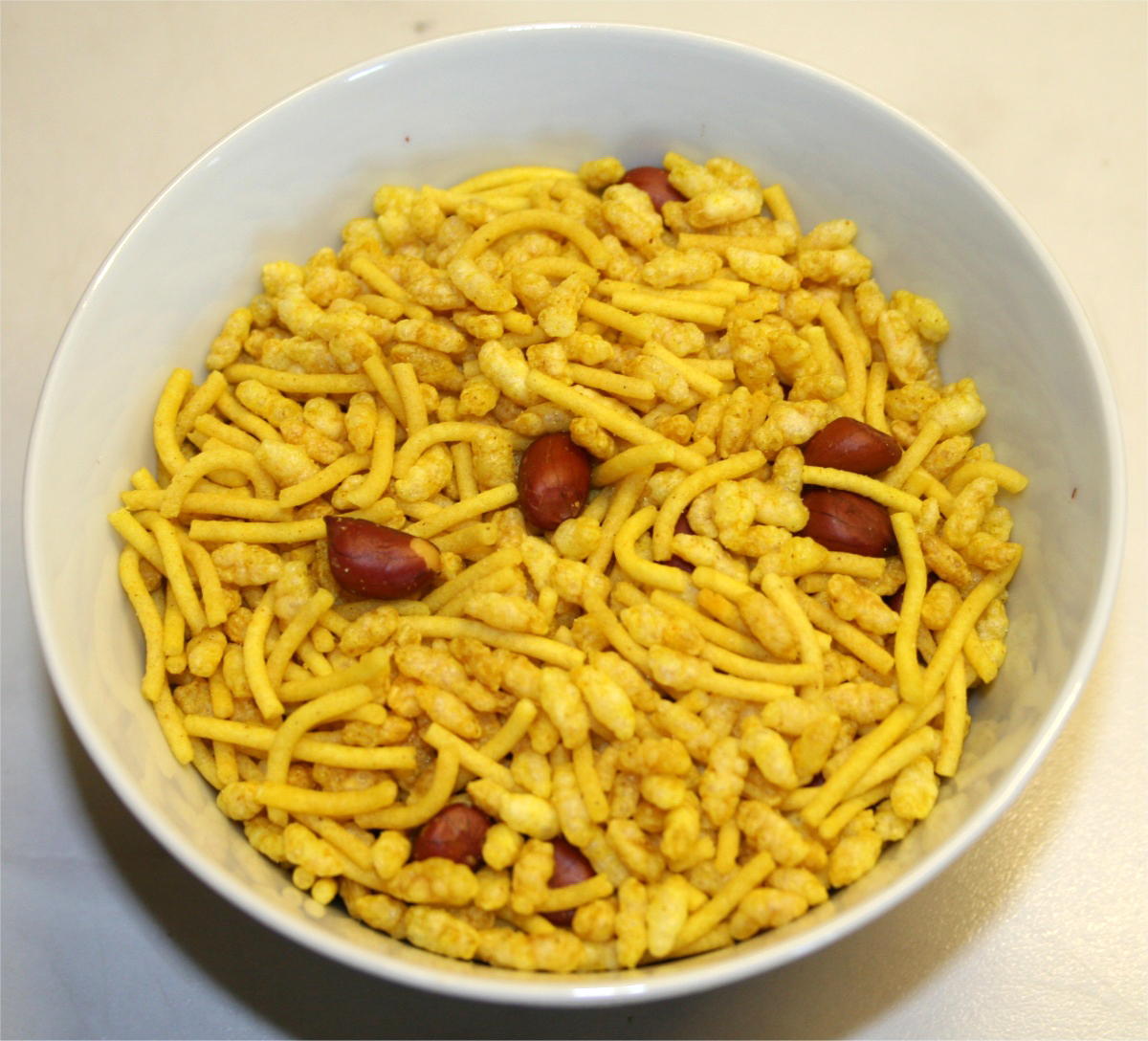
- A bowl of sev mamra
- Type: Snack
- Place of origin: India
- Main ingredients: Puffed rice, sev, peanuts

Sev mamra (mumra) also called mixture, is a Gujarati snack. It is a mixture of spicy dry ingredients such as puffed rice (mamra), savoury fried noodles (sev) and peanuts. These are sauteed in oil along with turmeric powder, chilli powder, curry leaves and salt.

Regional variation of the snack varies by adding capsicum, onions, or pickled mangos.

It is available in most parts of India, though it is known by different names in different regions. It is also known as 'sev murmura' and 'sev kurmura'.

== Uses ==
Sev mamra can be served as a snack with tea, or taken on travel as a dry snack. It can also be used to make chaats like bhelpuri and sukha bhel.

== See also ==
- Bombay mix
- Bhelpuri
- Ghugni
