= Chop suey (disambiguation) =

Chop suey is a dish in American Chinese cuisine.

Chop suey may also refer to:

== Cuisine ==
- American chop suey, a name for an American dish consisting of ground beef, elbow macaroni and a tomato based sauce

== Films ==
- Chop Suey, a 2000 film by Bruce Weber
- Chop Suey & Co. (1919 film), U.S. comedic short film

== Music ==
=== Albums ===
- Chop Suey, an album by DJ Yoda

=== Songs ===
- "Chop Suey", a musical number in the stage musical Flower Drum Song
- "Chop Suey", a song by Mr. Flash
- "Chop Suey", a song by the Ramones, from the soundtrack of the film Get Crazy
- "Chop Suey!", a song by System of a Down
- "Cornet Chop Suey", an instrumental by Louis Armstrong
- “CS”, a cover of the System of the Down song by Lil Uzi Vert from the album Pink Tape

== Other uses ==
- Chop Suey (painting), a 1929 painting by Edward Hopper
- Chop Suey (video game), a 1995 point-and-click adventure game
- Wonton font or Chop-suey, a typeface mimicking Chinese characters
- Chopsuey or Experiment 621, a character from the Lilo & Stitch franchise

== See also ==
- Chop socky, a genre of martial arts films
- Chinese bhel, Indian-Chinese version of chop suey
