= Culture of Mumbai =

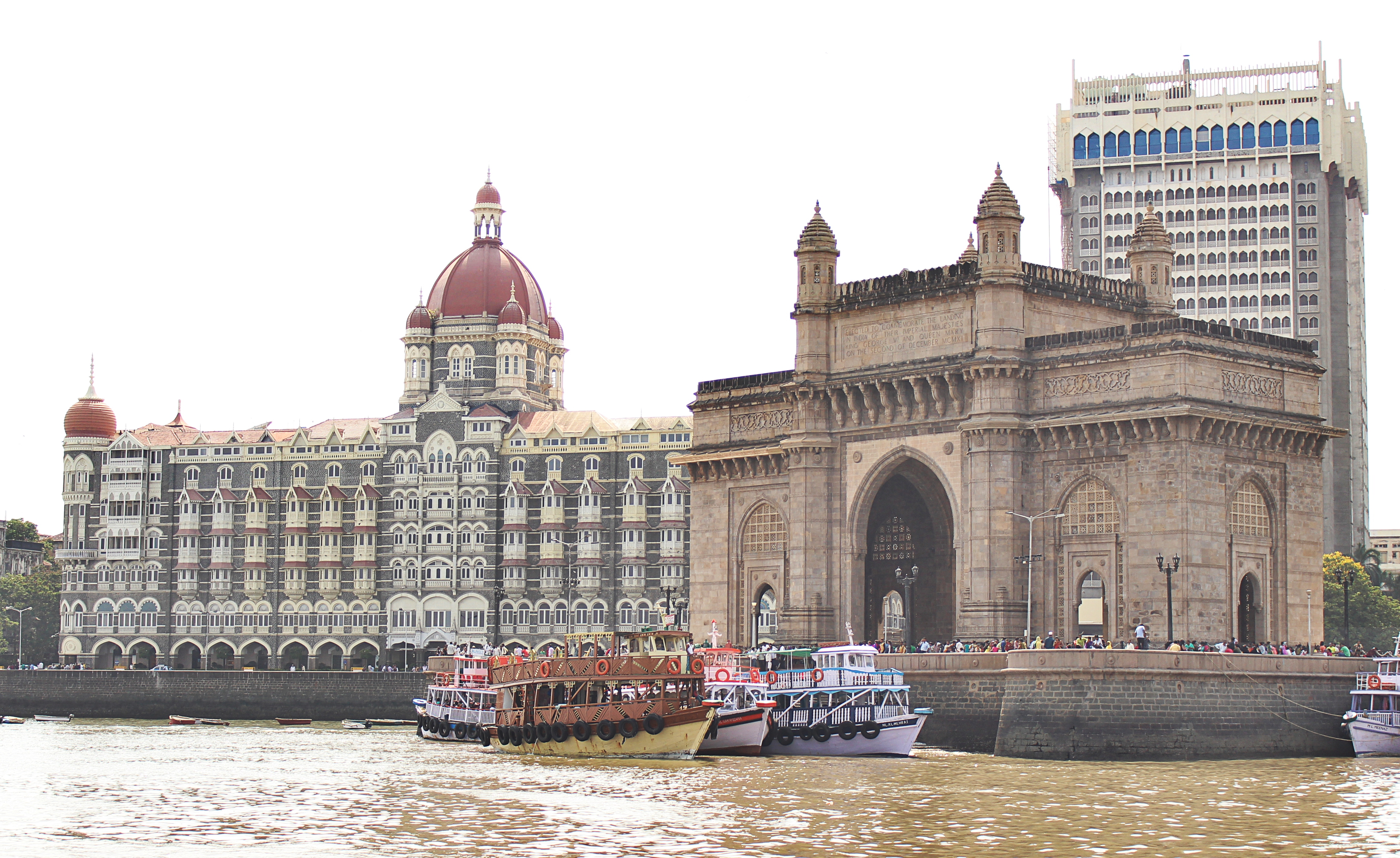
The Gateway of India (foreground) and Taj Mahal Palace Hotel (background).

A resident of Mumbai is called a Mumbaikar. People prefer to stay close to a railway station for easy access to the metropolis. Many city-dwellers lead a fast-paced life with very little time for other activities owing to a significant amount of time spent on daily commuting.

== Language ==
Marathi is the official language spoken in Mumbai.

== Cuisine ==
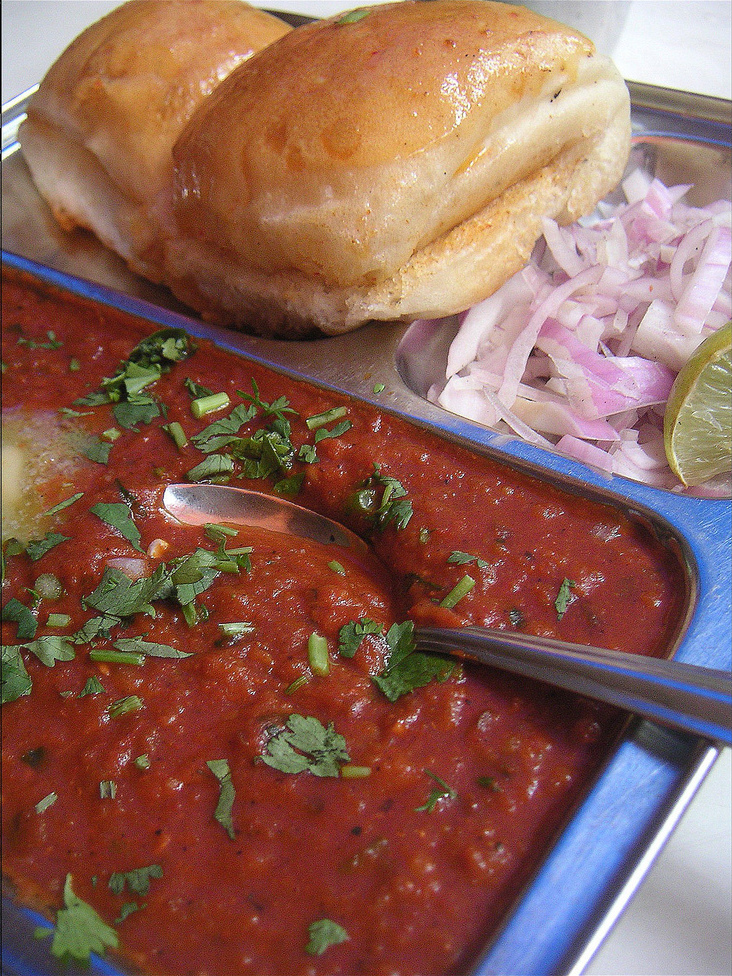
Pav Bhaji

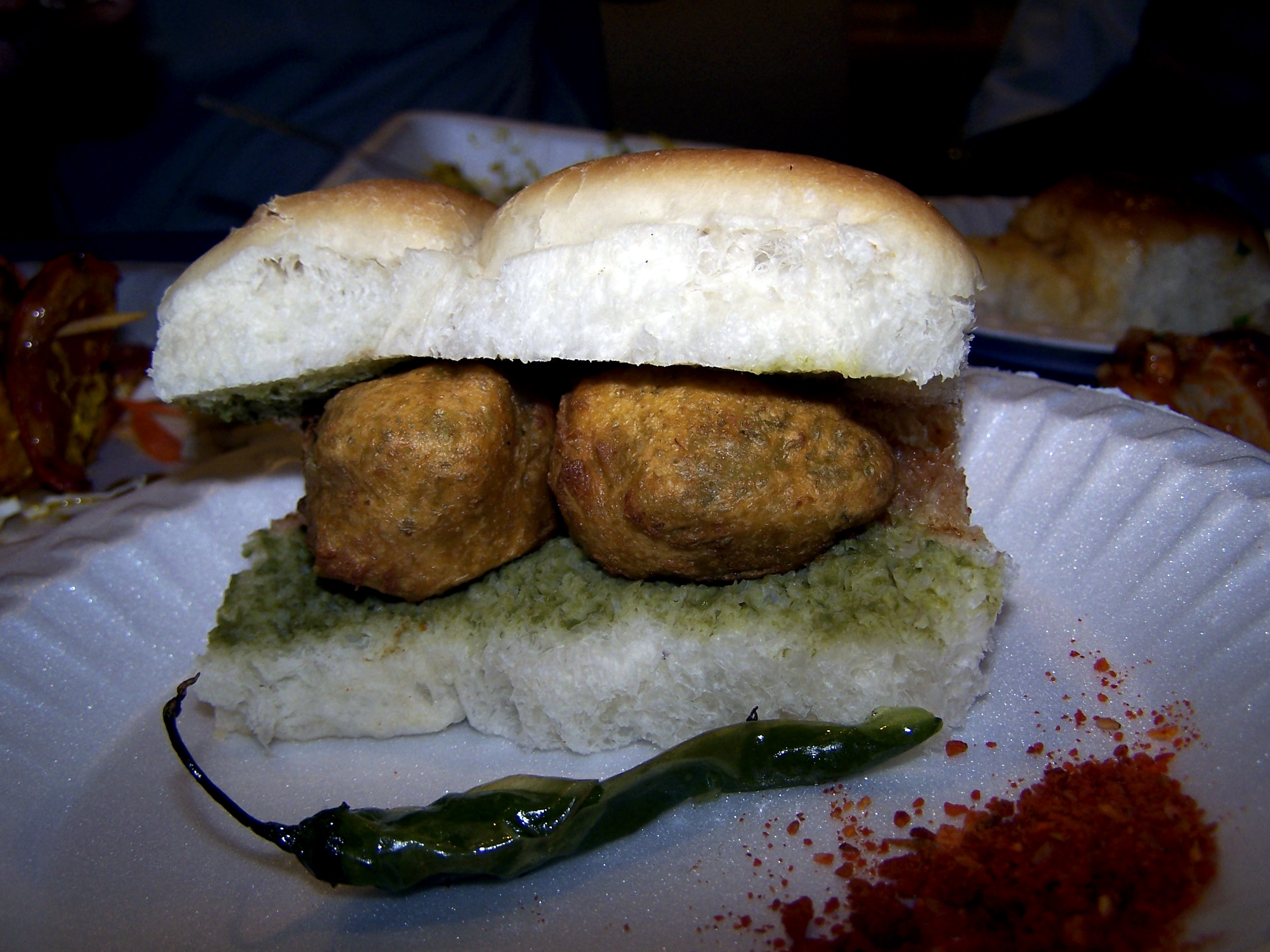
Vada pav

The metropolis has a roadside fast food scene consisting of Maharashtrian Pav bhaji, Vada pav, Dabeli, Panipuri, Bhel puri, etc. South Indian and Chinese cuisine is also popular in the city. Lebanese, Korean, Thai, Italian, Mexican, Mughlai, Punjabi, Mālvani, and Continental cuisine are also popular in Mumbai.

Mumbai has some of the oldest restaurants in India. Delhi Darbar, Sindhudurg, Highway Gomantak, Samrat, Vitthal Bhelwala, Mahesh Lunch Home, Kailas Parbat, Aram Vada Pav, and Adarsh are some of the oldest restaurants in the city. Mumbai is popular for its roadside food stalls, but it also has many swanky and high-end restaurants and pubs like Wasabi, Indigo, The Zodiac Grill, Aer, etc.

Mumbai's culinary diversity draws many people for the experience. It is very common for one to know Mumbai as a street food hotspot as it provides variety of flavours. Apart from the sheer variety of food from different cultural influences, Mumbai has Khau Galli and Chowpatty dedicated to fast food and meals alike.

Mumbai, being the financial capital, has a large migrant population. Members of the migrating families are working with no other family support, hence ordering food from close by restaurants or calling for pre-packaged meals (dabba as called locally) is an accepted thing. Owing to these recent trends, there have been some online food ordering services that have cropped up.

Tea is the most popular beverage followed by coffee. There are tea stalls in almost all roads and corners. Other drinks include fruit juices and coconut water. Irani café are a part of Mumbai's cosmopolitan heritage.

=== Notable dishes ===
Eggs Kejriwal was developed in the 1960s in South Mumbai; according to Tejal Rao, it was not well-known outside of that area before the 2010s. Pav bhaji, Vada pav, Dabeli, Panipuri, and Bhel puri are other examples of Mumbai dishes.

== Music ==
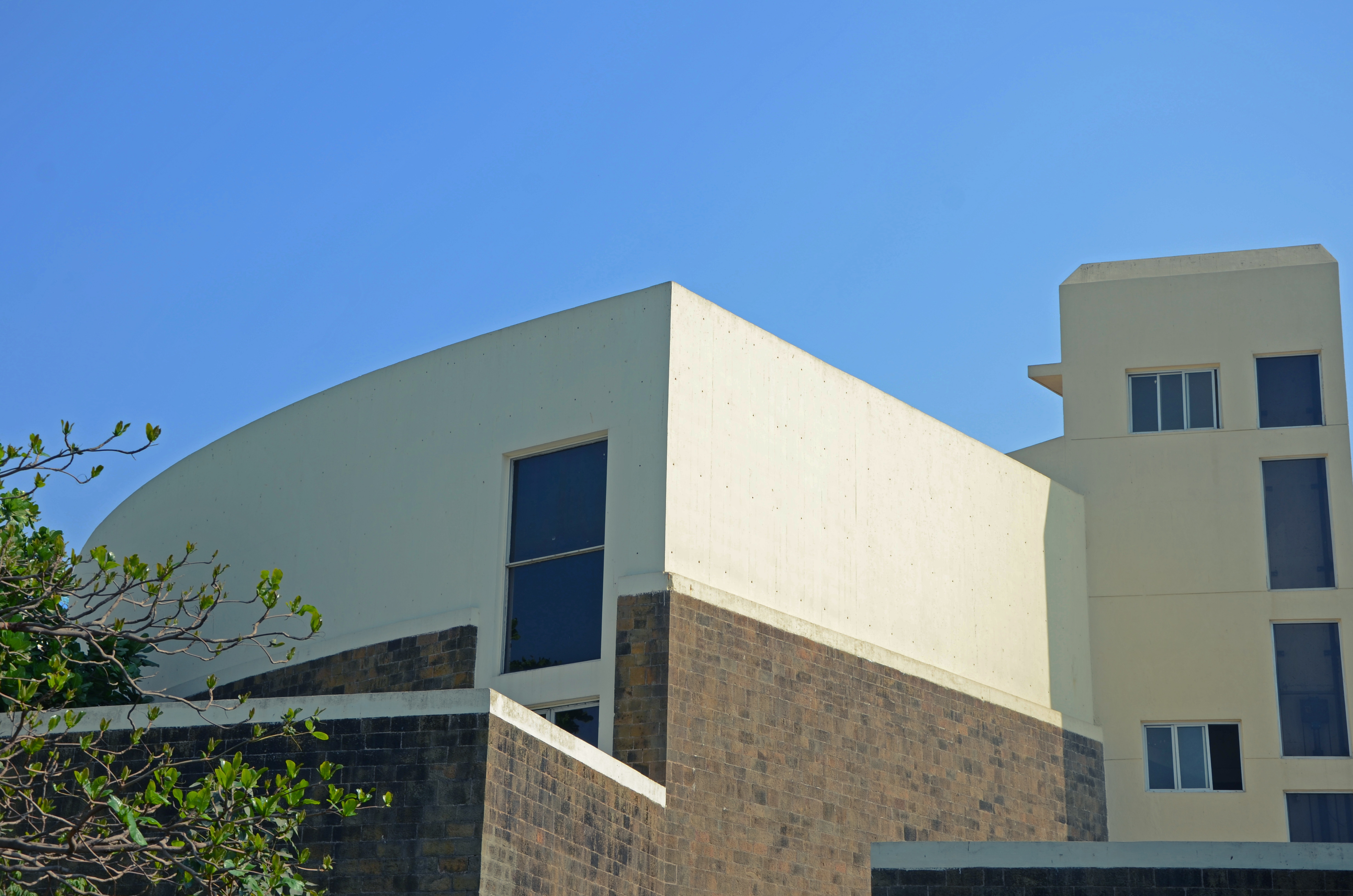
National Centre for the Performing Arts NCPA building, Nariman Point, Mumbai.

The Marathi koli songs, which was the original music of the city, are still heard in many coastal areas in its original form and even in repacked pop/party remix forms. The large number of migrants have also brought their own tastes in cuisine, music, films, and literature, both Indian and international. Bollywood music is the most popular type heard in the city played by the city's shops, taxis, and establishments. Indian pop, Marathi and Hindi music, Indian classical music, rock, and international pop music have fans in the city. Classical music too has a following in Mumbai. The Bombay Chamber Orchestra (BCO) was founded in 1962. It is the only Indian symphony orchestra that functions and performs on a regular basis with a concert standard of performance. The Symphony Orchestra of India originated in 2006 and is based in Mumbai. It often performs at the National Centre for the Performing Arts. Mumbai has also produced renowned classical musicians, like Zubin Mehta, who considers Mumbai his hometown.

English music has a following and the city's local English rock base has grown considerably having their own bands. International music from Beyoncé, Bryan Adams, Iron Maiden, Eminem, and Enrique Iglesias are popular here and sometimes outsell the Bollywood albums. The rock/metal industry is active and is based in Mumbai and Pune. Independence Rock, popularly known as I-Rock in Mumbai and Pune Woodstock of Pune are two of the major rock festivals of the Mumbai-Poona rock circuit.

== Festivals and Events ==
=== Religious ===
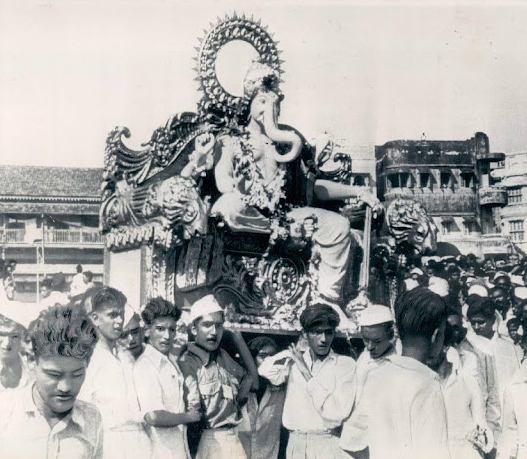
Immersion of Ganesh idol on the occasion of Ananta Chaturdashi in 1946

Mumbai residents celebrate Indian celebrations and festivals. Holi, Diwali, Vijayadashami, Ganesh Chaturthi, Eid, Moharram and Maha Shivaratri are some of the festivals in the city.

Ganesh Chaturthi is one of the major festivals, celebrated in the city with great fervor. This festival involves the placing of an idol of Lord Ganesha in the house for either 1½, 3,5,7 or 11 days after which it is immersed in the ocean, after a colourful and noisy parade. This festival was started by Bal Gangadhar Tilak as a means of unifying all the people and emphasize the need for India's independence from the British. This is primarily celebrated by Maharashtrians, but almost all Mumbaikars participate in one way or another. Here, all the festivals are celebrated with great joy and happiness.

=== Non-Religious ===
Non-religious festivals include the Queer Azaadi Mumbai, Mumbai's annual pride parade. Nationalistic festivals including the Independence day are also celebrated.

== Architecture ==
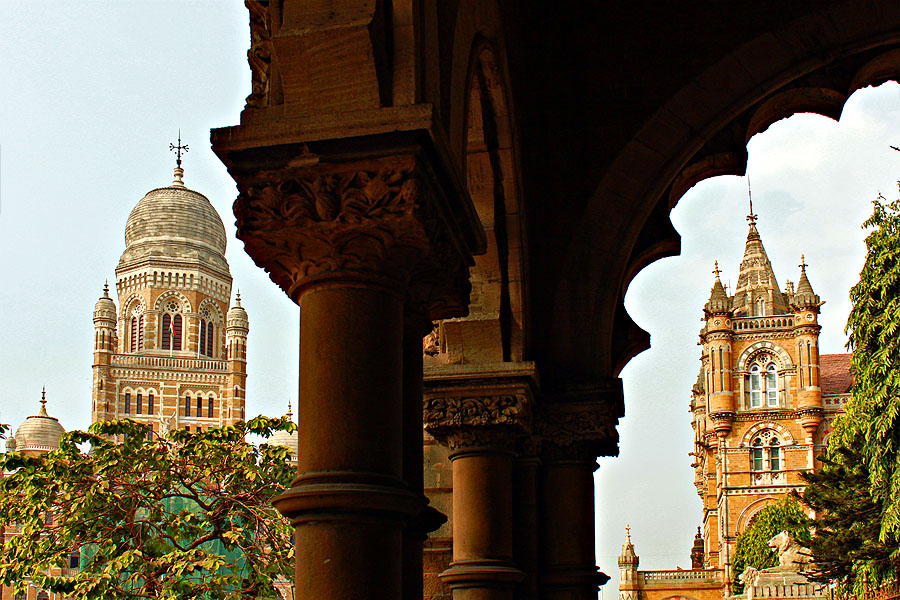
Finials of BMC and CST.

=== Colonial ===
In 2004, Mumbai received two heritage conservation awards from the UNESCO. The Marine Drive is home to some of the finest buildings of the art deco style, (also called Indo Deco or Bombay Deco,) which flourished in the 1920s and 1930s. During the British era, the Indo-Saracenic architecture was the official architecture of the city. Many Indo-Gothic monuments also line South Mumbai — Chhatrapati Shivaji Terminus; BMC building, Gateway of India are some of this style.

Mumbai has housing structures known as Chawl ('chaal' in Marathi). These are the remnants of the once booming cotton mills which provided job opportunities and led to migration of people to Mumbai. Chawls still occupy a large portion of the Mumbai residential area.

=== Post Colonial ===
Modern buildings and skyscrapers dominate the skyline.

== Cinema ==
Mumbai is the birthplace of Indian cinema with the oldest film shot in the country in 1896 in the Kala Ghoda area. Many cinemas, including an IMAX dome theatre, catering to mainstream Marathi, Bollywood and Hollywood films dot the city. The city contains some old movie theatres like the Plaza, New Empire Cinema (Mumbai) and New Excelsior. Due to taxation policies of the State Government, it has become more profitable to operate Multiplexes and so many movie theatres are making way for other developments or interior overhauls. An example of this is Sterling Theatre at Chhatrapati Shivaji Terminus. INOX's 11 screen Megaplex at Inorbit Mall is Mumbai's biggest multiplex.

The city is also home to film studios. These include Film City in Goregaon, and Raj Kapoor's R.K. Studios in Chembur, Filmistan, Sashadhar Mukherjee's Filmalaya and V. Shantaram's Rajkamal Kalamandir.

== Cultural centers ==
Mumbai hosts plays and cultural performances. Some of the theatres are Prithvi Theatre at Juhu, Dinanath Natyagruha at Vile Parle, Shanmukhananda Hall at Matunga, Prabhodankar Thackeray Theatre at Rang Sharda at Bandra and the theatres at the National Centre for the Performing Arts (India), Nariman Point.

=== Museums and Art Galleries ===
There are two public art galleries, The Jehangir Art Gallery and The National Gallery of Modern Art and a museum in South Mumbai. The Asiatic Society of Mumbai is the oldest public library in the city, built in 1833.

There are many museums in the city, including Dr. Bhau Daji Lad Museum, Cowasji Jehangir Hall and Chhatrapati Shivaji Maharaj Vastu Sangrahalaya.

The commercial art galleries are mostly located in the Colaba and Fort area of downtown Mumbai. They include Chemould Prescott Road, Pundole, Guild, Sakshi, Mirchandani+Steinrucke, Chatterjee & Lal, and Project 88.

== Sports ==
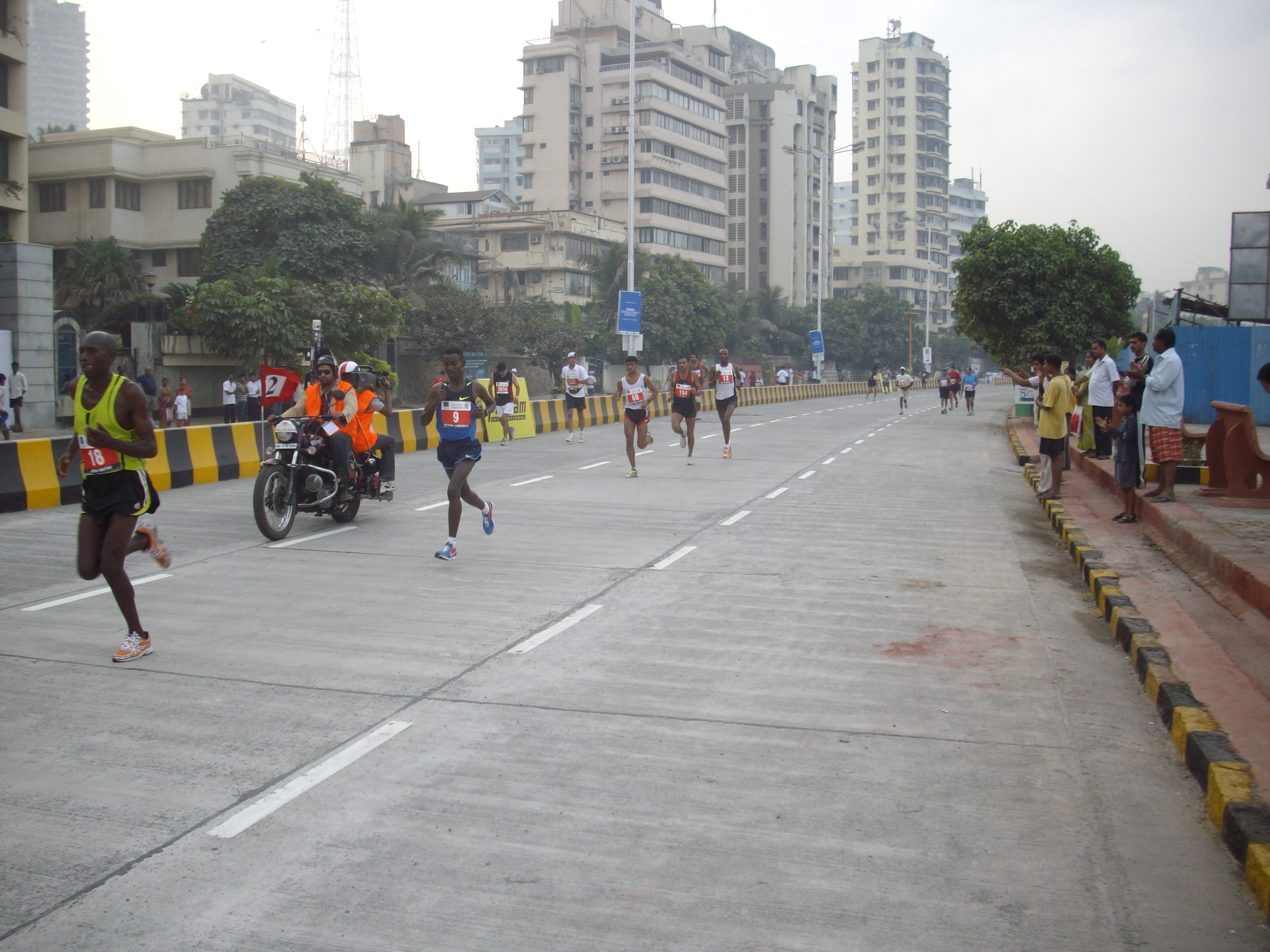
Runners at the 2009 Mumbai Marathon.

Mumbai has hosted several world sports events, including 1982 Men's Hockey World Cup, 2004 Kabaddi World Cup, and matches for the 1987, 1996, and 2011 Cricket World Cups.

The Mumbai Marathon held annually is one of the largest mass sporting events in Asia.
