= Masala puri =

Indian snack

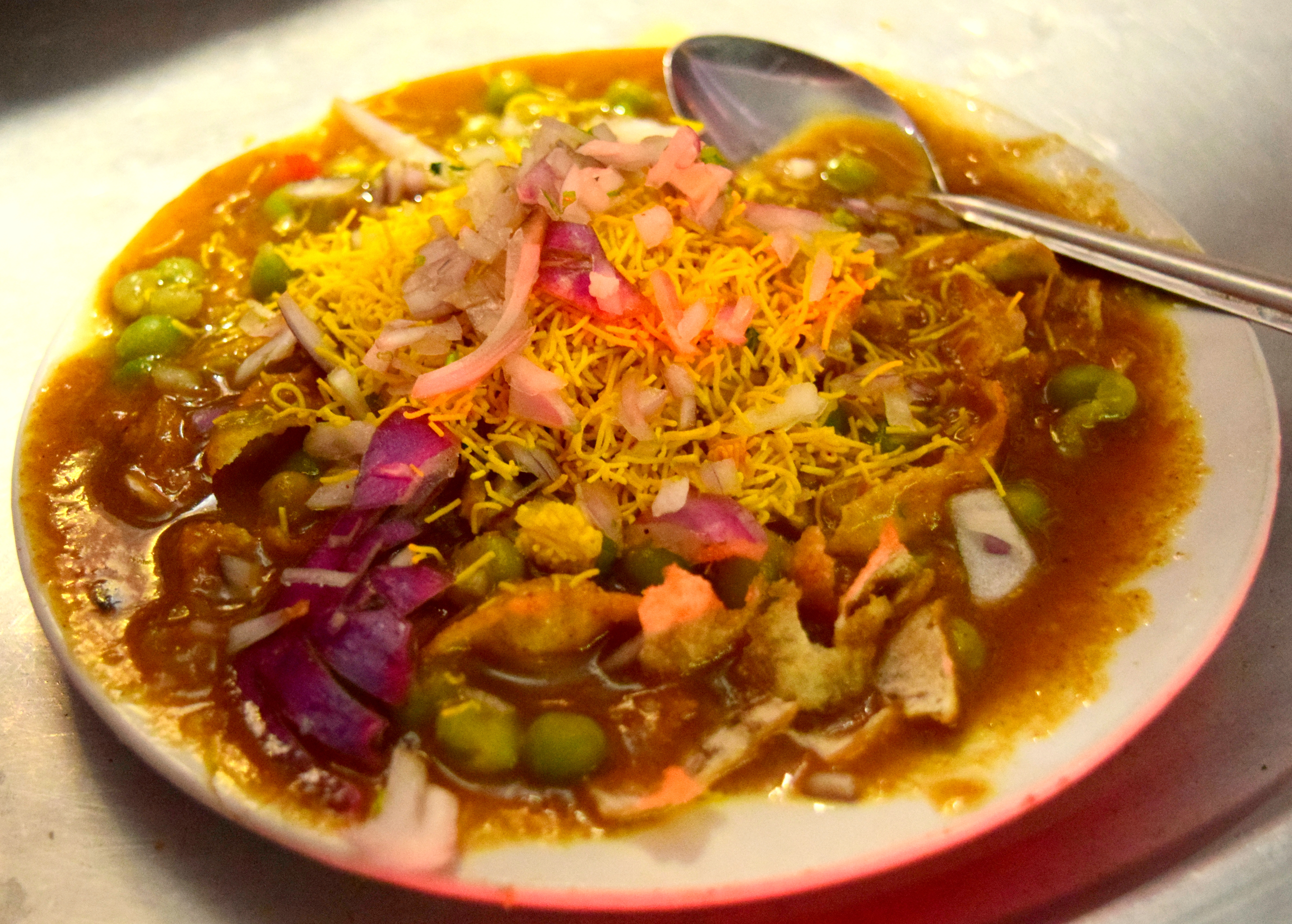
- Masala puri
- Place of origin: India
- Region or state: Karnataka
- Main ingredients: Puri, sev, Puffed Rice, onion, tomato, chili powder, green peas and coriander leaves
- Variations: Dahi-masala puri

Masala puri, or Masalpuri, is an Indian snack which is especially popular in the south Indian state of Karnataka. A form of chaat, the dish originated in the Mysore region and has now become famous in the entire Indian subcontinent. Typically spicy, the dish can also be made sweet based on the requirement.

== Preparation ==
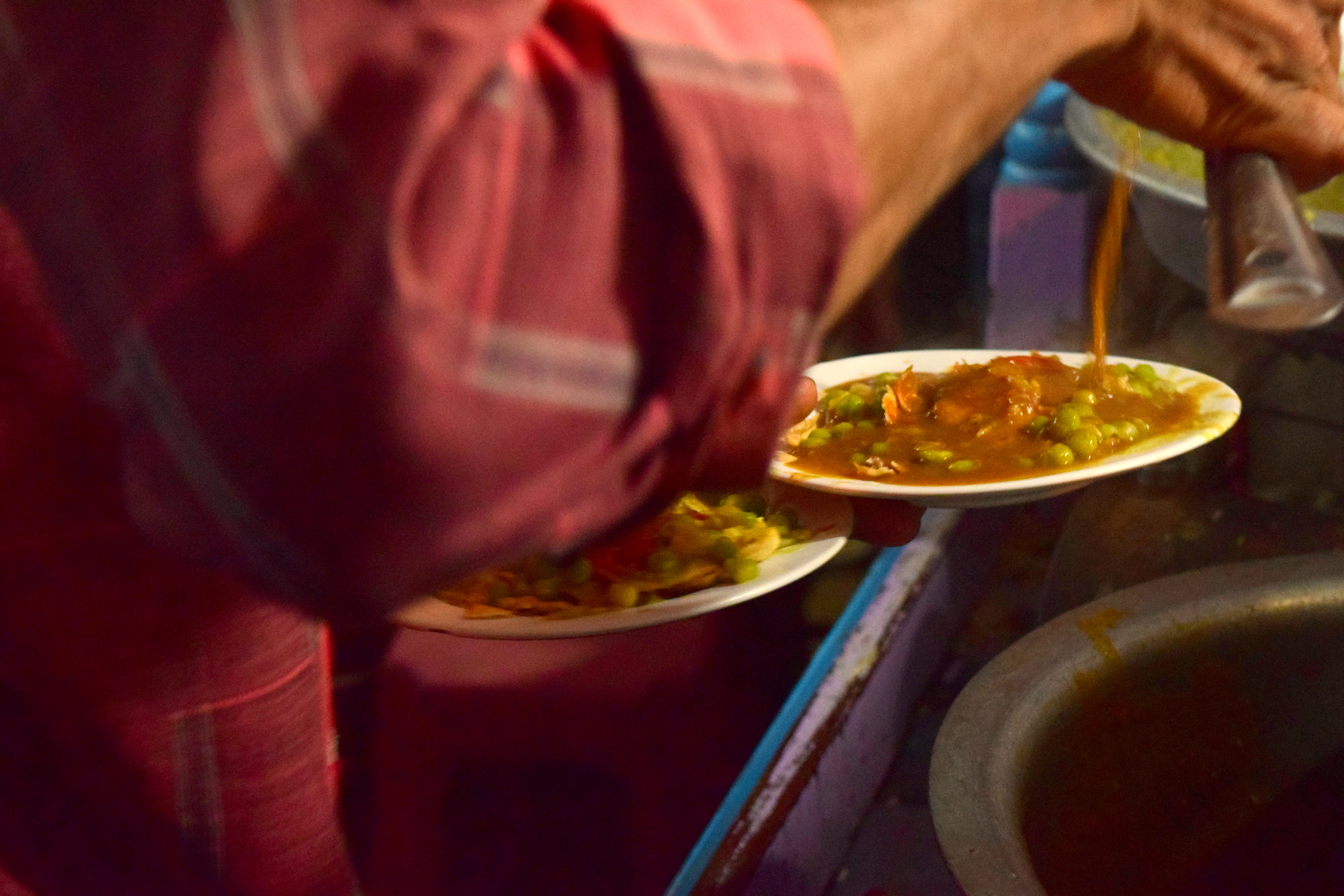
Two plates of masala puri being prepared by a vendor. The gravy is being poured onto the dry ingredients.

Crushed puris are soaked in hot masala gravy made up of puffed rice, green peas, chili powder, garam masala, chaat masala, coriander powder, etc. Toppings of small slices of onion and tomato, coriander leaves and sev are then added, before the dish is served. Sometimes carrot shavings are added, but they are not required.

== See also ==
- Panipuri
- Sevpuri
- Dahi puri
- List of snack foods from the Indian subcontinent
