= Street food of Kolkata =

Food sold by street vendors in Kolkata, India

Street food of Kolkata is the food sold by hawkers and street vendors from portable market stalls in the streets of Kolkata, India. It is a defining characteristic of the city, giving Kolkata the name "The City of Joy". Its street foods include Indian street food as well as Chinese, Mughlai, British, and even European foods.

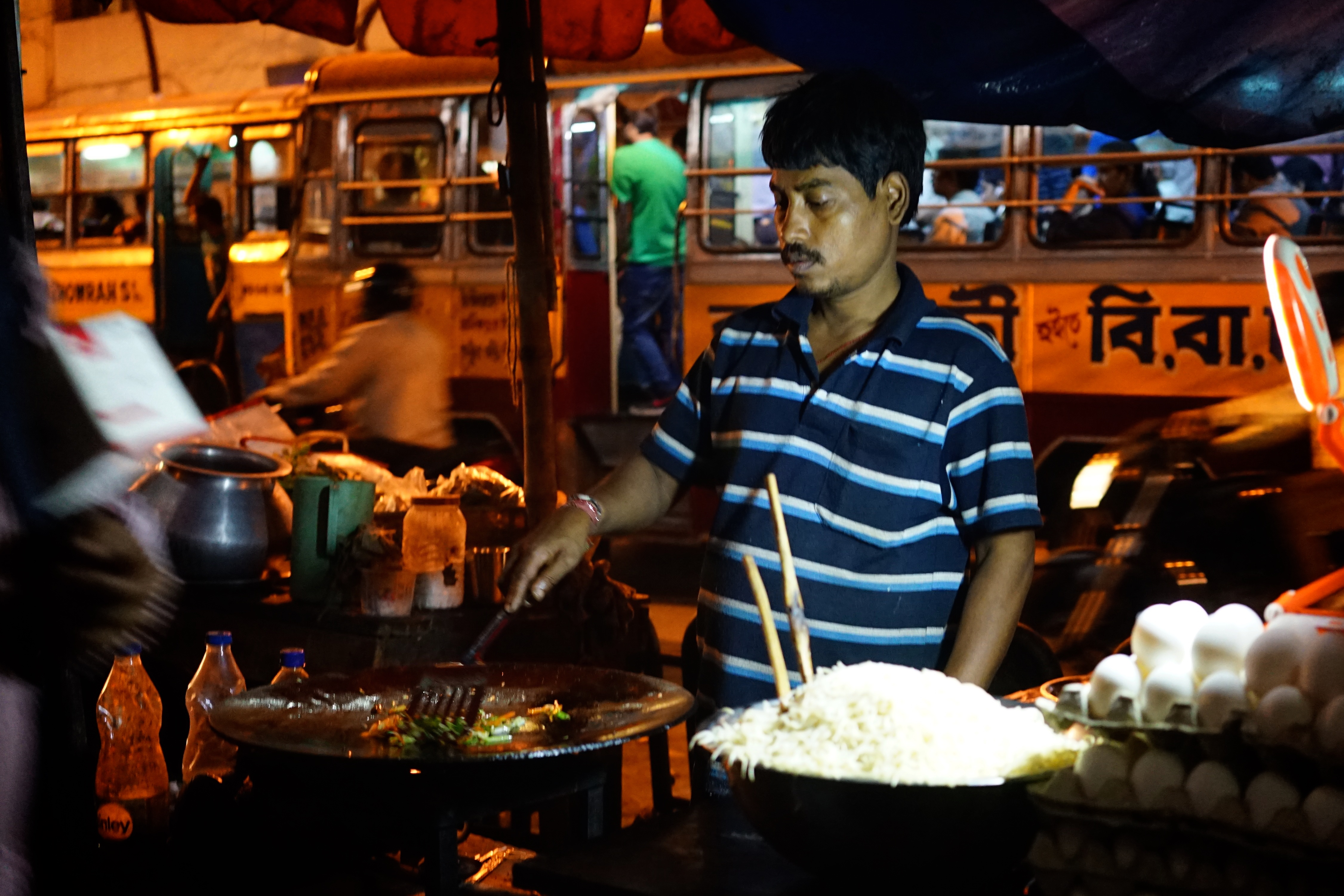
A street fast food stall in Kolkata

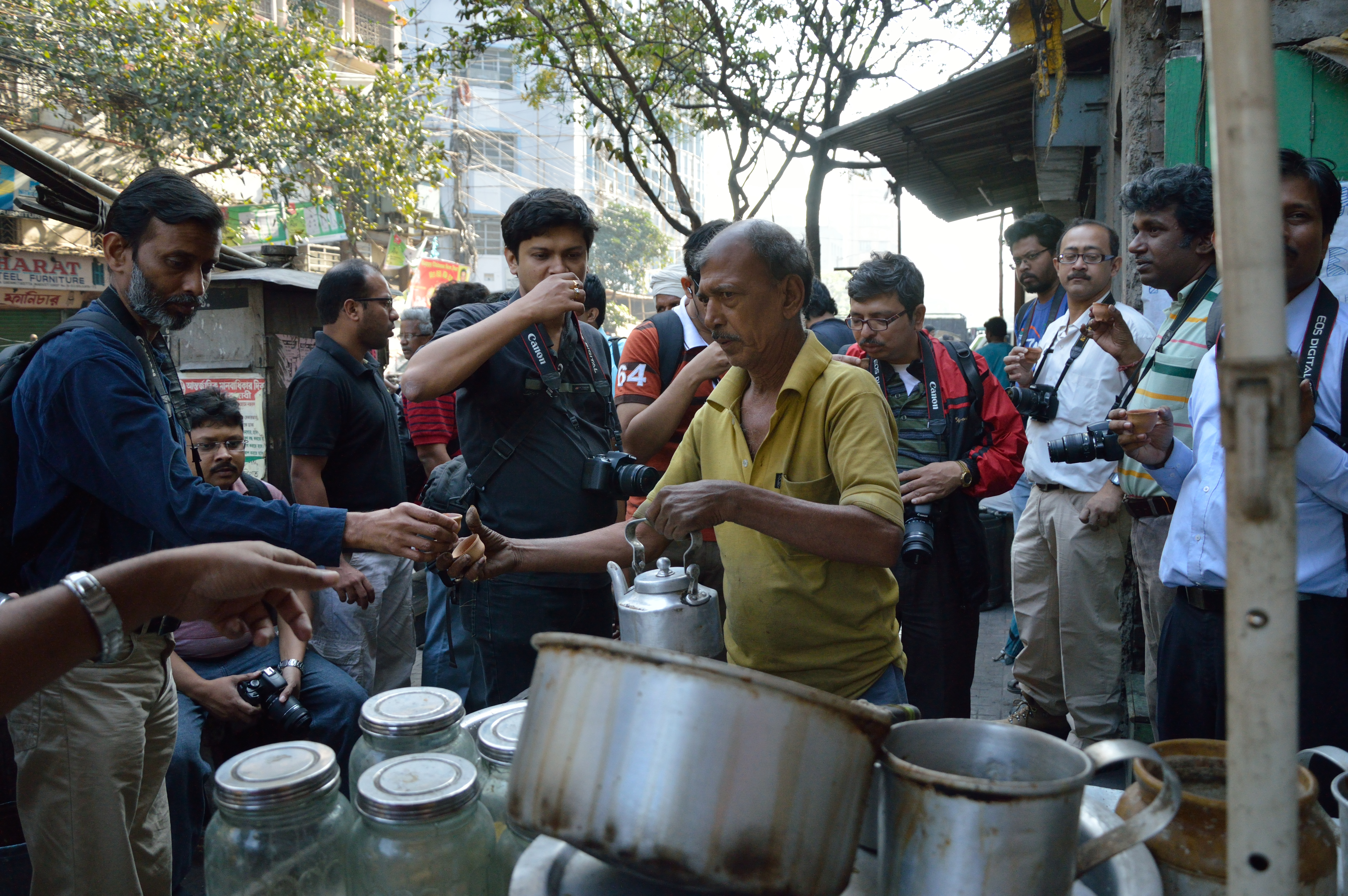
Tea stall at Chitpur, Kolkata

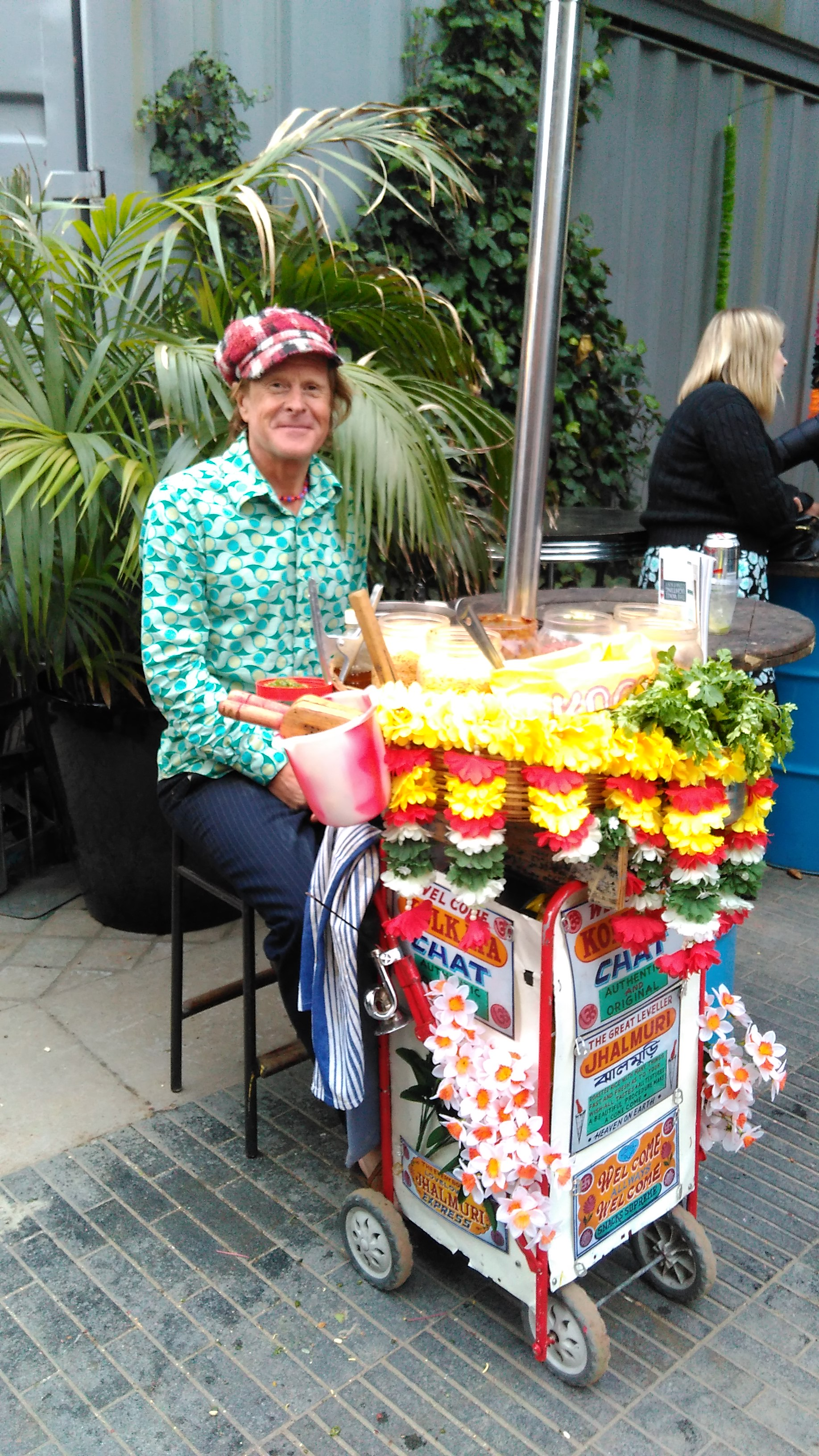
A chaatwala in London inspired by the street food of Kolkata

== Varieties ==
- Luchi Alur dom

Luchi and alur dom is one of the most popular, cheap and widely consumed street foods in Kolkata. Daily workers or passers-by prefer it since it can be consumed quickly. In many shops, puri, kochuri, parota, and naan are served with alur dom.

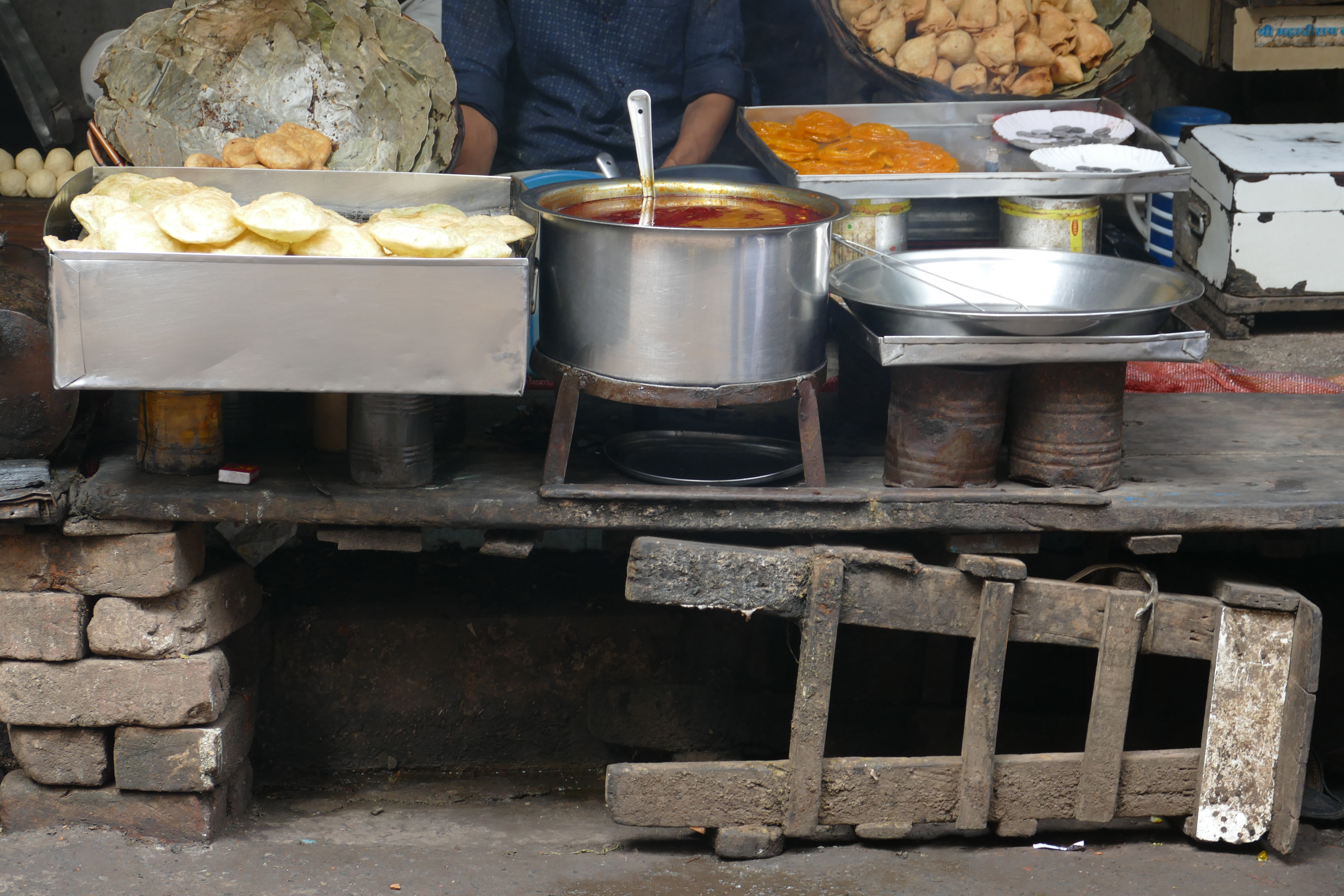
Kochuri alur dom along with singara sold in a street food stall in Bara Bazar, North Kolkata.

- Pakora

Street vendors and restaurants sell various types of pakoras stuffed with potato, egg, onion, cauliflower, chicken etc. Chicken pakora is the most famous pakora among the consumers.

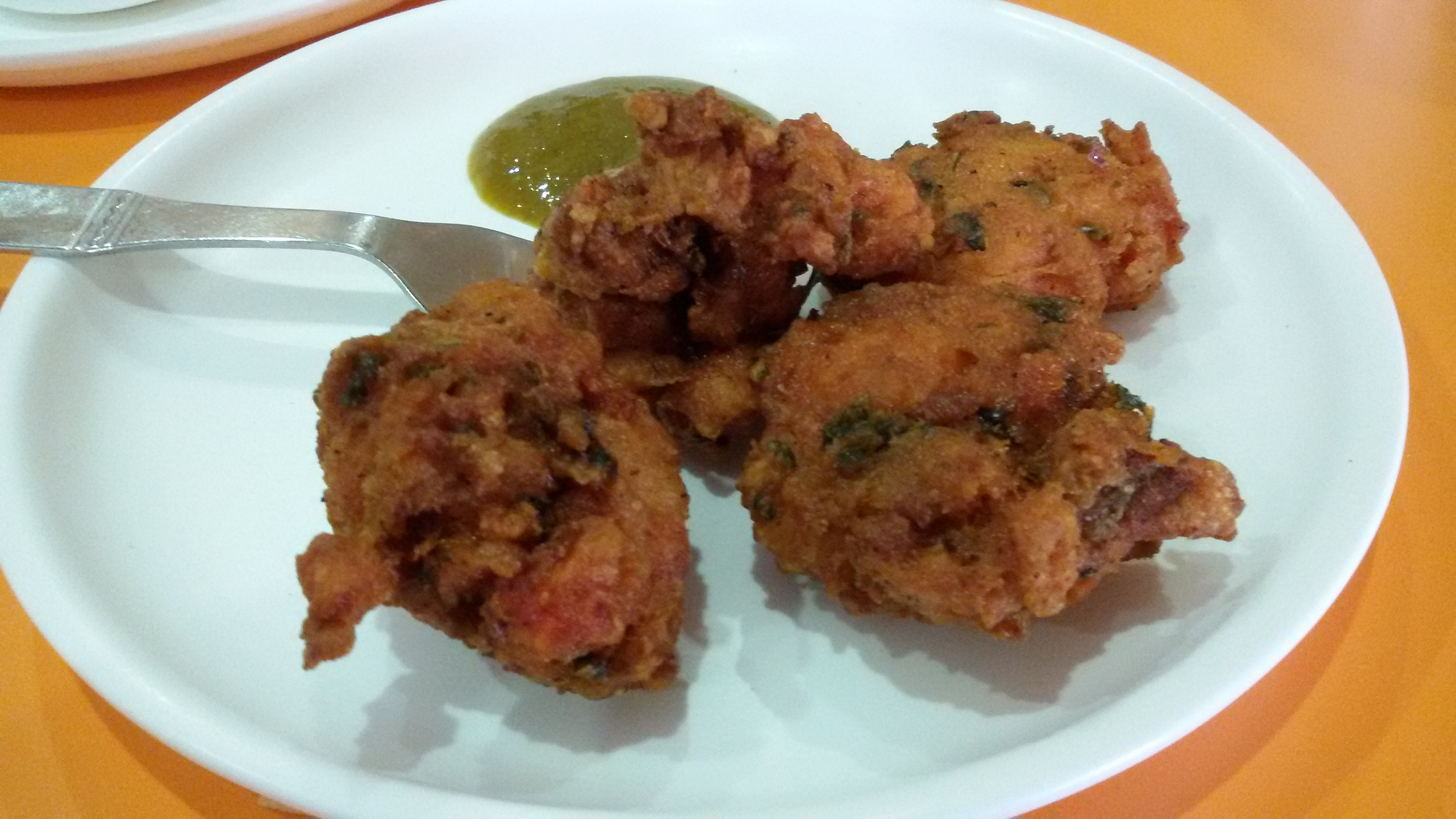
Chicken Pakora

- Fast food

Stalls containing fast foods are frequently seen in the streets which contains Indian as well as Chinese fast foods. Notable fast foods include chowmein, fish fingers, momos, kathi rolls etc.

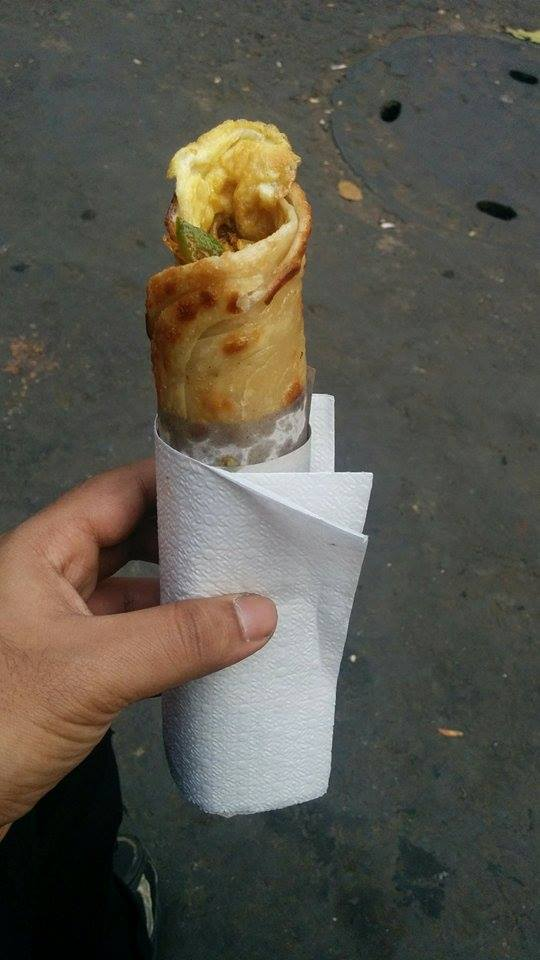
Chicken roll

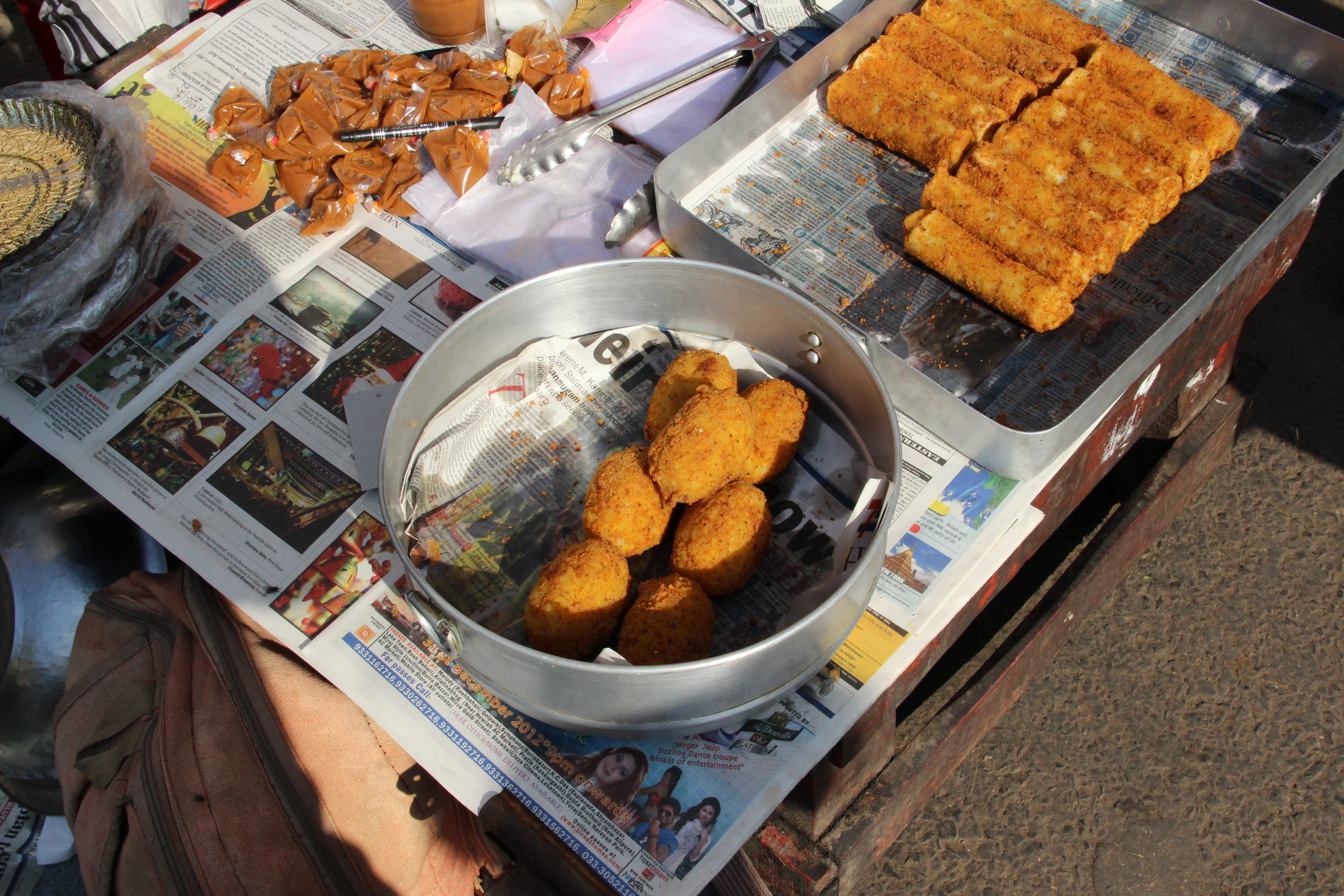
Devilled eggs and rolls in a portable stall, in China Bazar

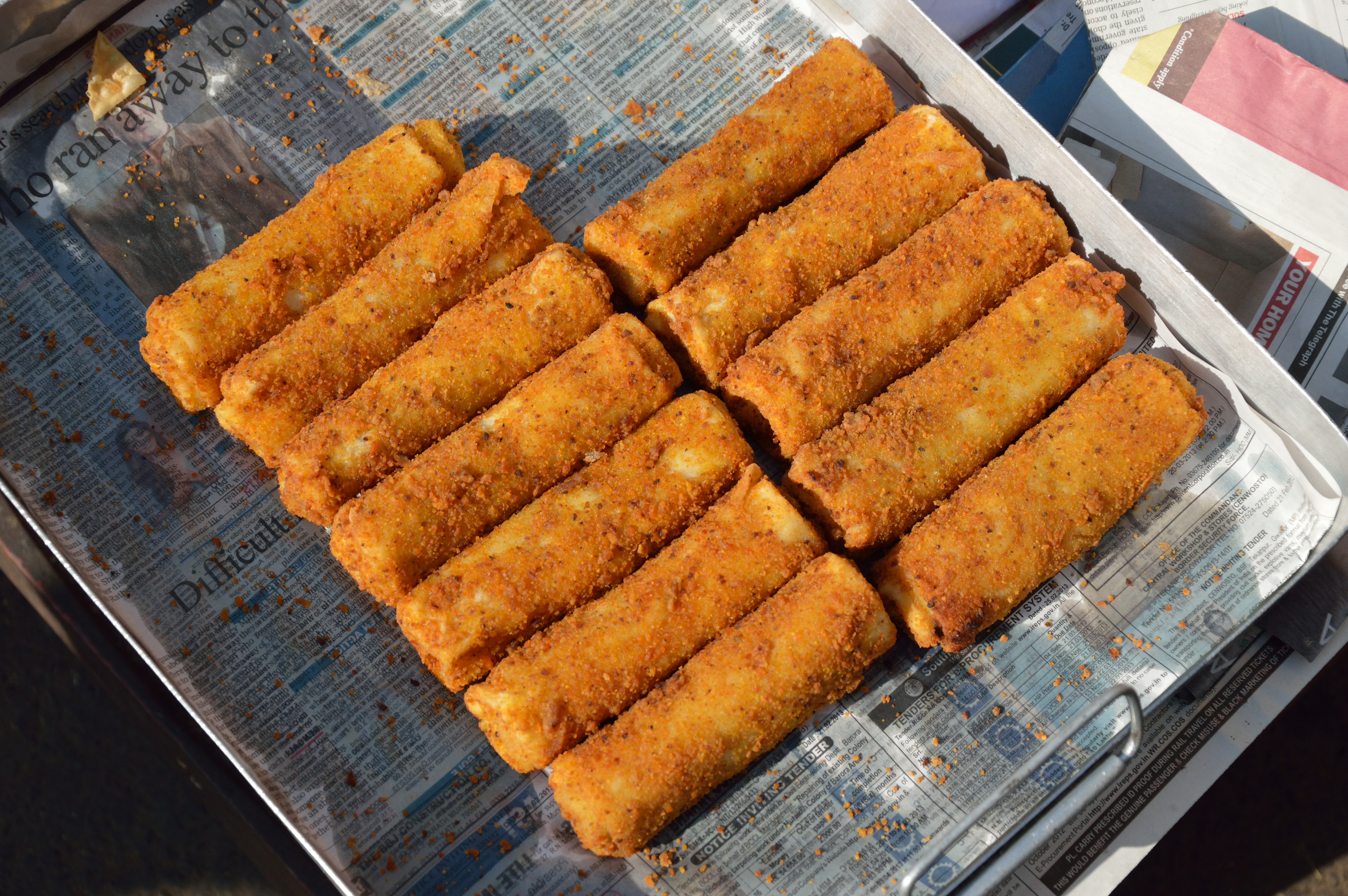
Pork rolls

- South Indian foods

South Indian foods like idli, sambar, dosa, coconut chutney are among the most consumed street foods in Kolkata since these are easy to eat.

- Kulfi

Kulfi is a famous desert in Kolkata, known for its cooling effect during the summer, available in flavours like malai, kesar and elaichi.

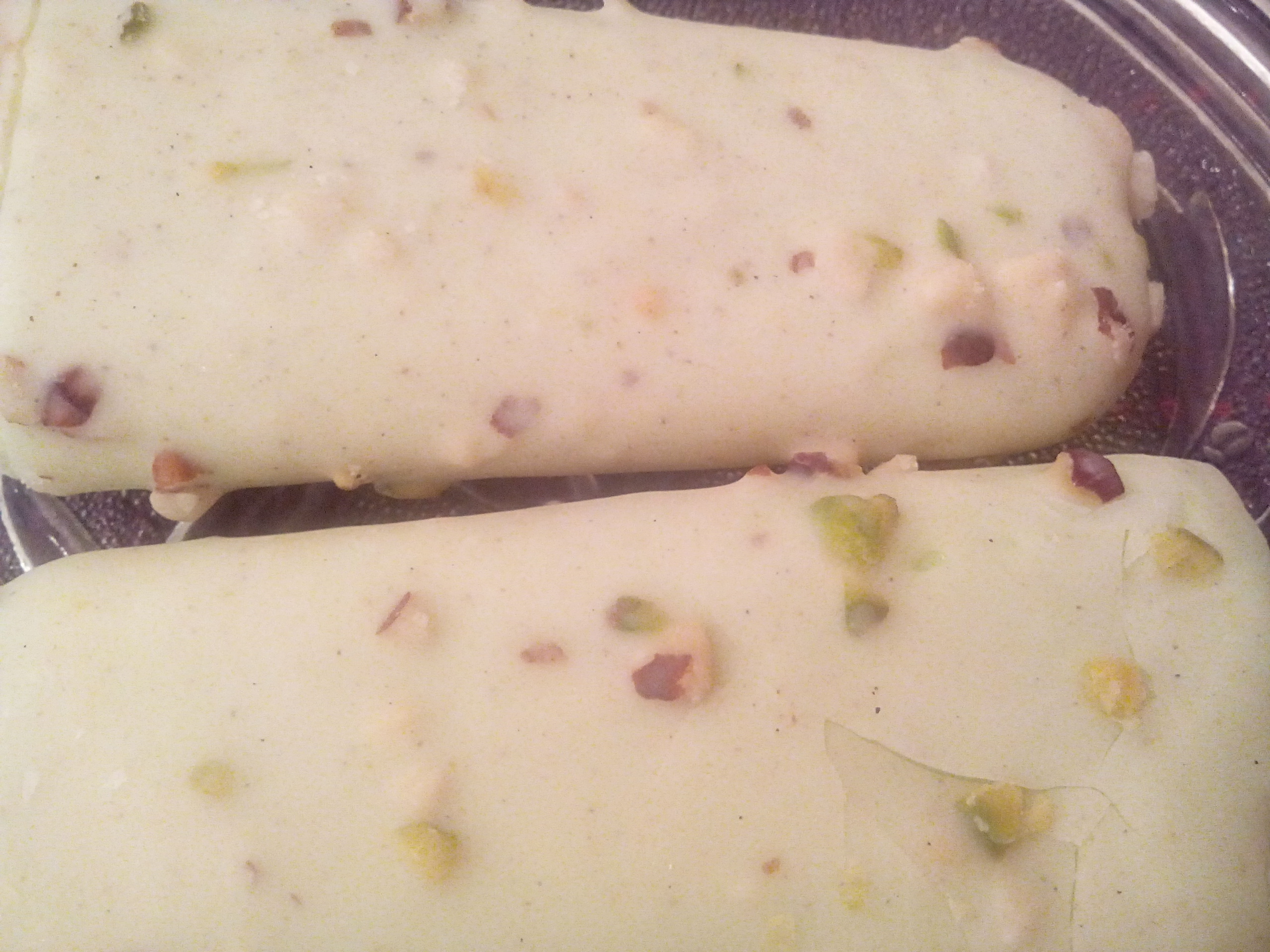
Pista Kulfi

- Other street foods

Other street food of Kolkata includes papri chat, phuchka, ghugni, jhalmuri and singara, telebhaja, radha ballavi, masala kochuri, aloo kabli, jalebi, ghoti gorom, jhal muri, badam makha, doodh cola etc.

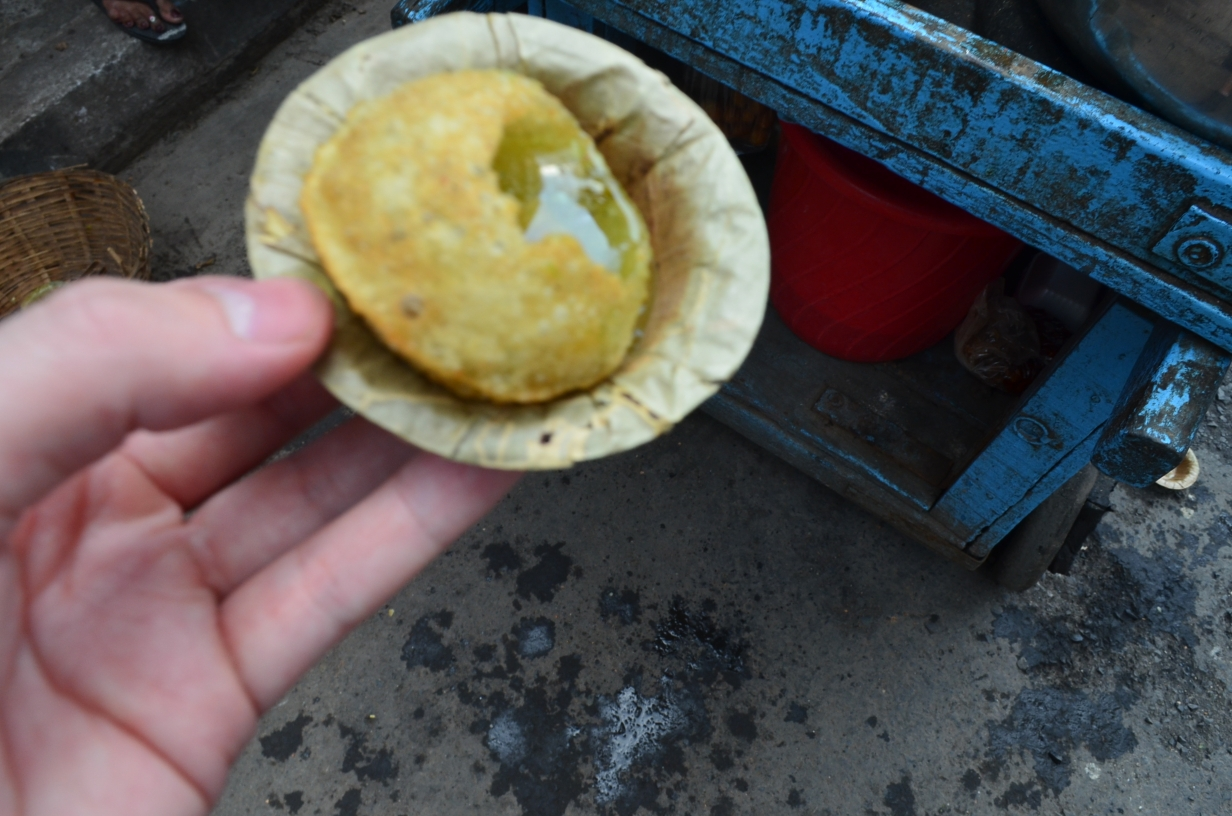
Phuchka in a leaf plate

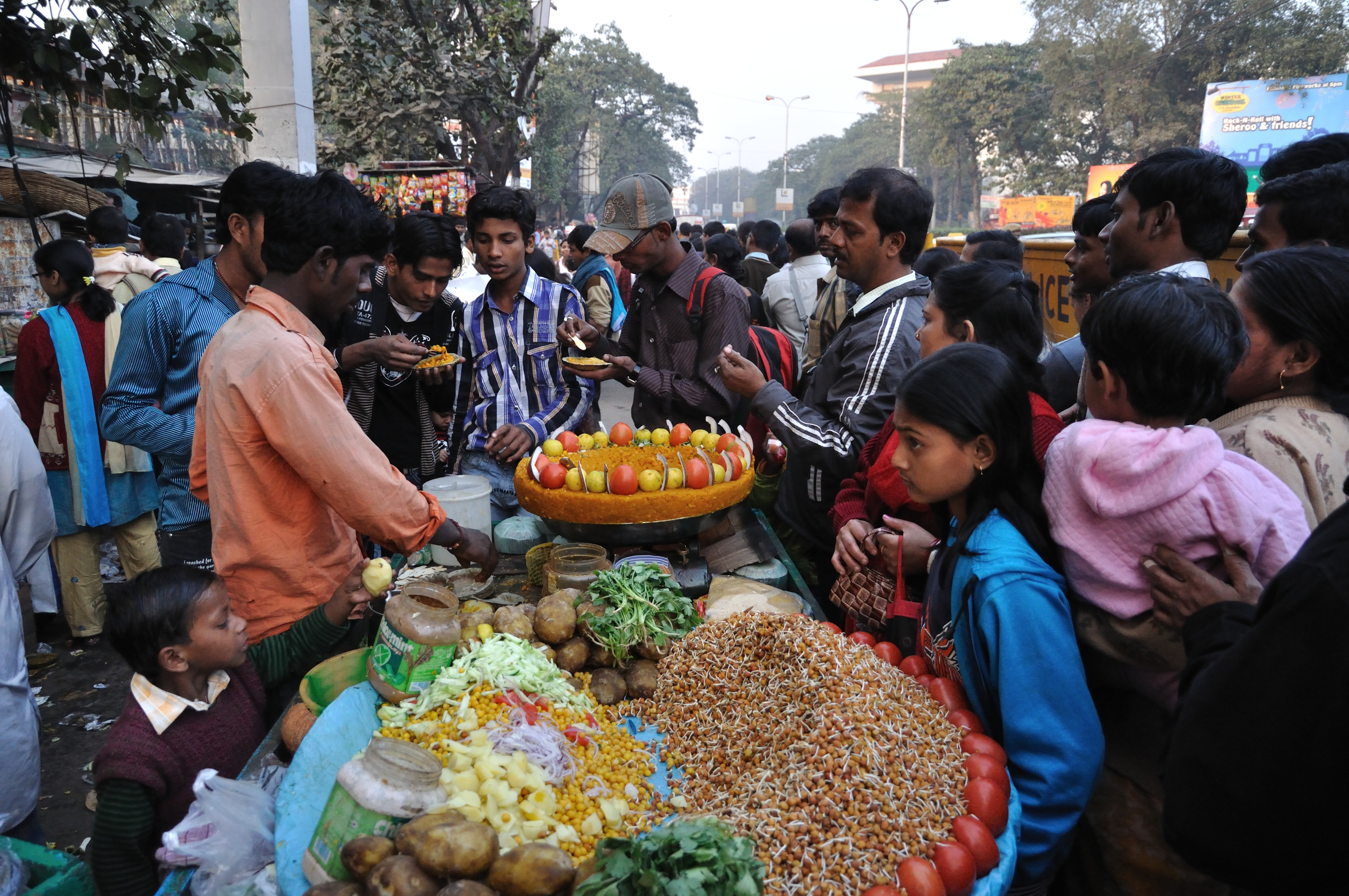
Ghugni and masala chaat at a stall

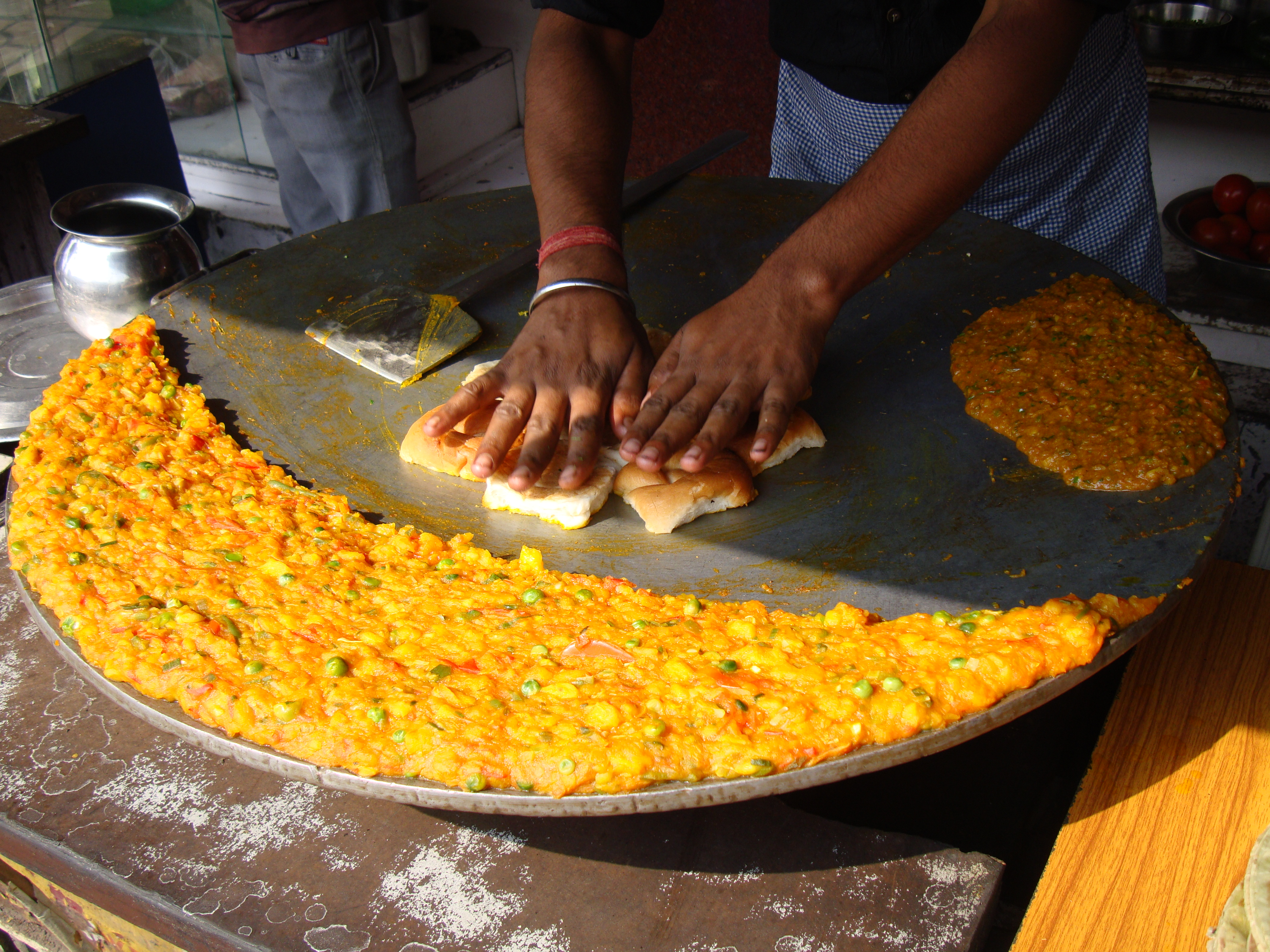
A pav bhaji stand

== Areas and spread ==
Although Kolkata has food stalls in nearly every part of the city, some areas are renowned for their various offerings of street foods. North Kolkata has comparatively more street food stalls than South Kolkata. Surya Sen Street, Sealdah, Bidhan Sarani, Shyambazar have some stalls, popular since the 90s.

Decars Lane or James Hicky Sarani is a lane in Dharmatala, Central Kolkata, which is famous for its cheap and tasty food stalls. Maniktala has famous shop which still sells per kochuri at 25 and 50 Paisa.

Exide more near Rabindra Sadan, Shyambazar 5-point crossing etc. are famous for its momo.

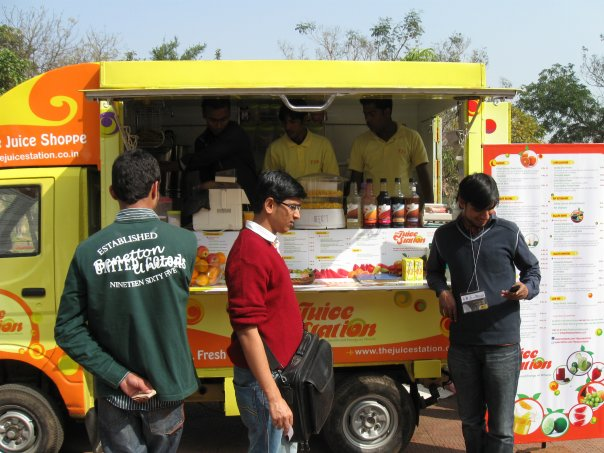
Juice Stall in Salt Lake Sector V.

== See also ==
- Indian fast food
- Street food of Mumbai
- Street food of Chennai
- Indian cuisine
- Culture of Kolkata
