= Chinese bhel =

Indian noodle dish

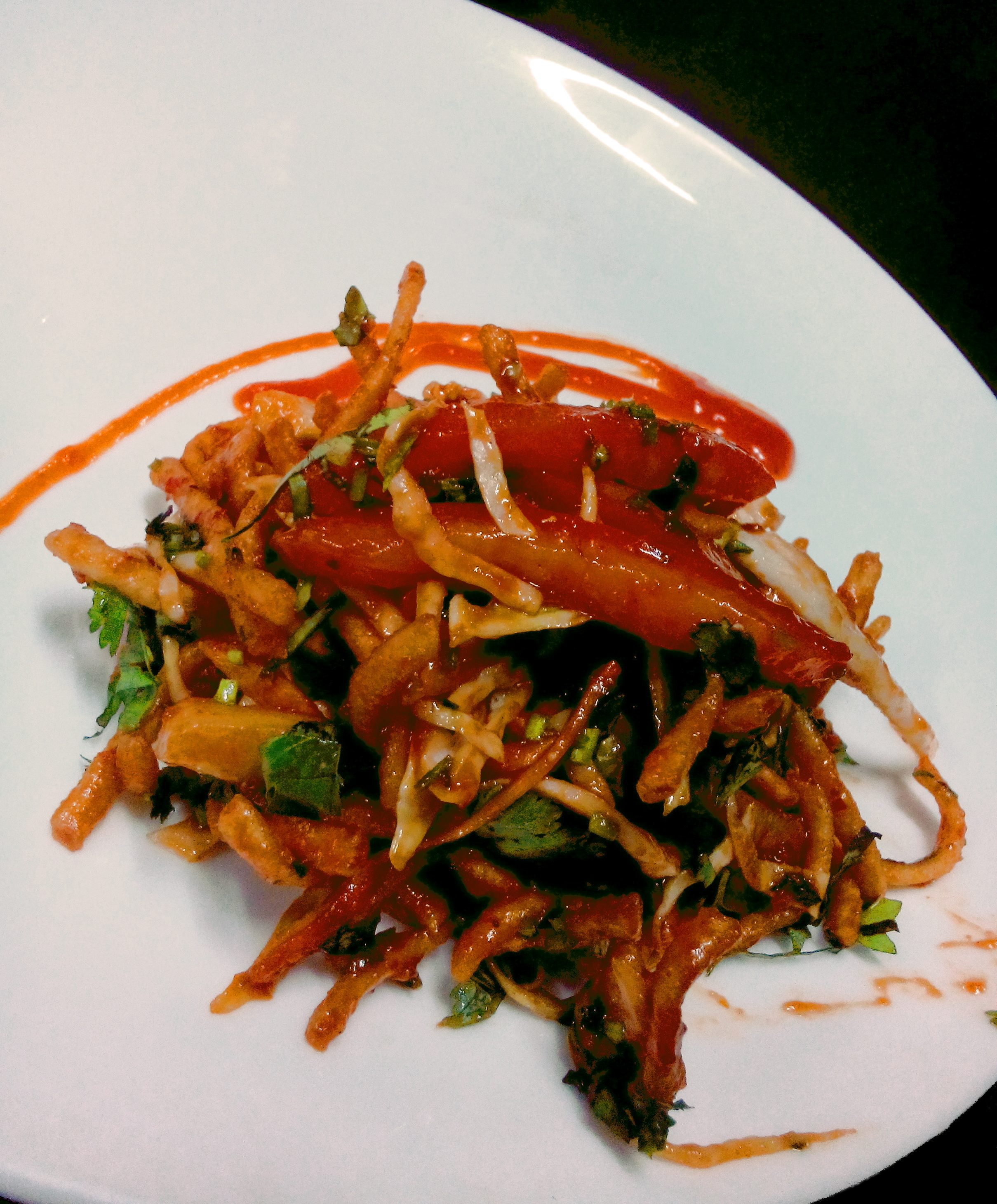
- Place of origin: India
- Main ingredients: fried noodles; Schezwan sauce; raw shredded cabbage

Chinese bhel is a fast food and street food item in India and is considered part of Indo-Chinese cuisine. It is a variant of chop suey and bhelpuri. It is popular in Mumbai.

== Ingredients ==
Like most street food items, the recipe of Chinese bhel has many variants. The basic ingredients present in every recipe are crisp fried noodles, raw shredded cabbage, and one or more hot sauces. These ingredients are thoroughly mixed together in the style of making a bhelpuri. The sauces could be Schezwan sauce, red chilli sauce, and/or tomato ketchup.

In addition, it may contain one or more of these ingredients: finely chopped onion, sliced capsicum, diced carrot, soya sauce, salt, black pepper powder, monosodium glutamate, vinegar, and raw garlic paste in varying quantities. Sometimes chopped spring onion is used for garnishing.

== Criticism ==
Chinese bhel stalls in Mumbai were criticized for poor hygiene and were suspected to have caused a hepatitis E epidemic over a two-month period in 2011.

The Municipal Corporation of Greater Mumbai (MCGM) has issued strict orders not to let hawkers sell fried foodstuffs on pavements and Chinese food outside schools. The Congress party had recently demanded that the MCGM ban the sale of Chinese street food due to fears related to its use of monosodium glutamate.

== See also ==
- Ching's Secret
- Manchurian (dish)
