= Sev (food) =

South Asian snack food

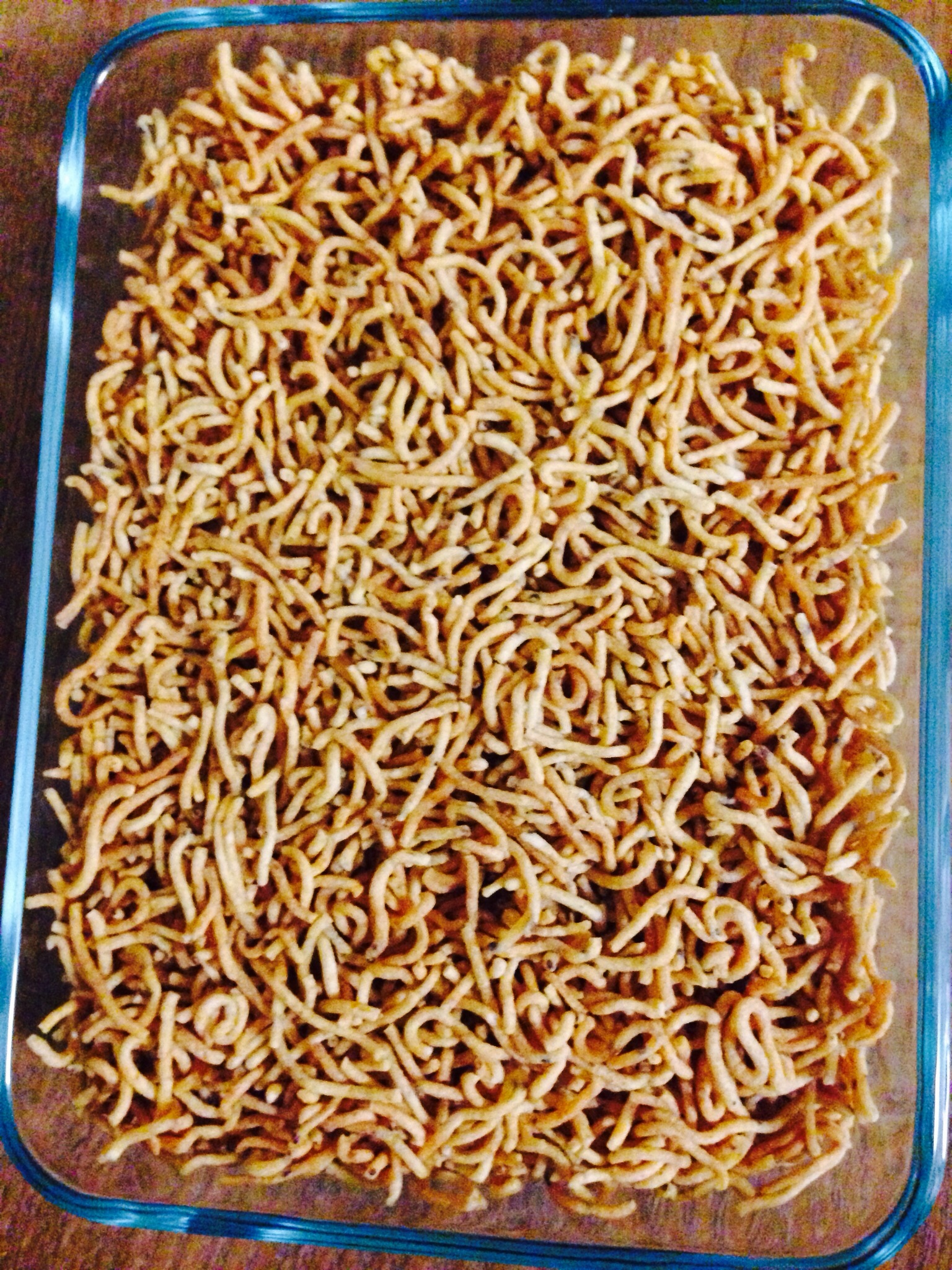
- Sev
- Course: Snack
- Place of origin: India, Pakistan
- Region or state: South Asia
- Main ingredients: Chickpea flour
- Variations: Ratlami sev, Indori sev, Gaathiya, Potato sev, Oma podi, bhujia

Sev is a popular South Asian snack consisting of small pieces of crunchy deep fried noodles made from chickpea flour paste, which are seasoned with turmeric, cayenne, and ajwain before being deep-fried in oil. In Tamil Nadu, sev is made with ajwain and is known as Oma podi. These noodles vary in thickness. Ready-to-eat varieties of sev, including flavoured sev, are available in Indian stores.

Sev is eaten as a standalone snack and is also sprinkled as a topping on dishes like bhel puri and sev puri. Sev can be made at home and stored for weeks in airtight containers.

Sev is a popular snack across South Asia with several regional variations, particularly for chaat snacks in Uttar Pradesh and Bihar where it is eaten topped with sweetened boondi. The snack is also popular in Madhya Pradesh, especially in the cities of Indore, Ujjain and Ratlam, where many snack foods contain sev as a main ingredient. In Madhya Pradesh, sev is used as a side ingredient in almost every chaat snack food, especially ratlami sev, which is made from cloves and chickpea flour. In Pakistan common varieties include Masala Sev, Dal Sev, and Bareek (thin) Sev. It is widely consumed with tea or in chaat, with packaged brands like Rehmat-e-Shereen and Karachi Nimco being prominent. Many varieties of sev are sold commercially, such as laung (clove in Hindi and Urdu) sev, tomato sev, palak sev, plain sev, kara sev, bhujia and Bombay mix. Mota sev is a variety of sev which is bigger in size.

Popular varieties of sev mixed with nuts, lentils and pulses are commonly sold as 'Bombay mix' or chanachur.

While mostly known as a snack food or topping, sev can also be a key ingredient in legume curries. The dish Sev Usal is a curry made with onions, tomato, and gravy cooked with boiled and dried peas. A handful of crunchy sev is added in the liquid pea gravy, much like one adds crunchy cereal to liquid milk.

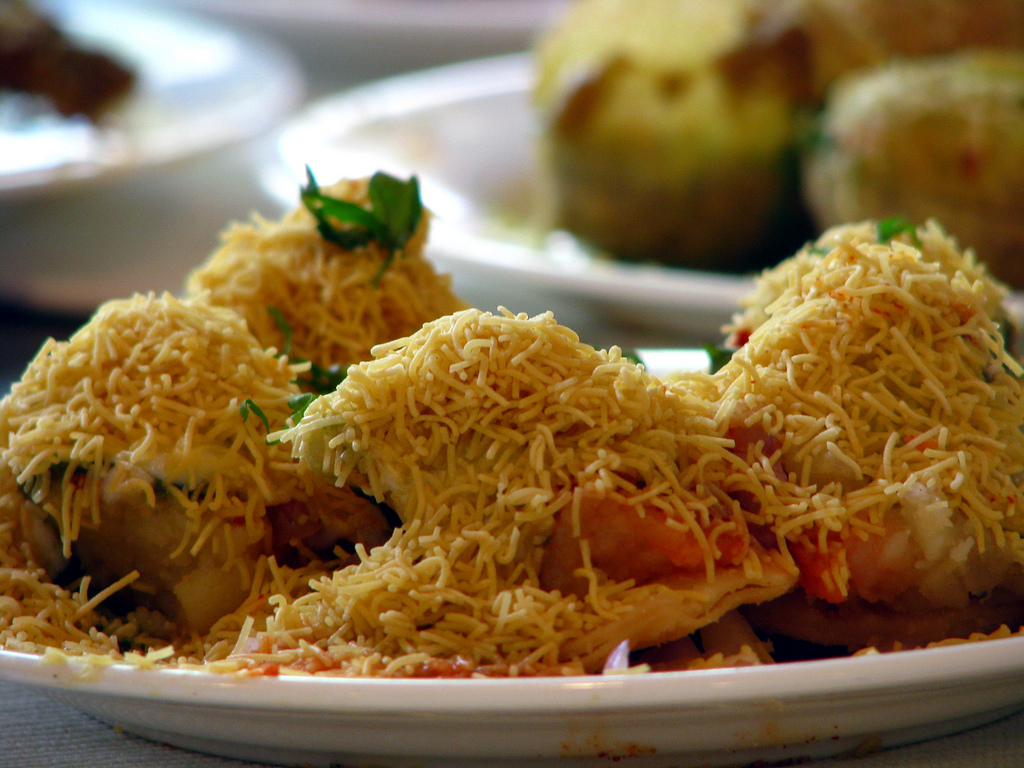
Yellow bits of sev on sev puri

Sev deep-fried chickpea flour noodles made by pressing batter through a sieve, Jodhpur, India
