= 6 Ballygunge Place =

- Interactive map of 6 Ballygunge Place

Restaurant information
- Established: 2003
- Owner: Savourites Hospitality Pvt Ltd
- Head chef: Sushanta Sengupta (Founding Director, Culinary Head)
- Food type: Bengali cuisine
- Dress code: Casual / Smart Casual
- Location: 6 Dr Amiya Bose Sarani Road, Ballygunge Place, Kolkata, India, West Bengal, 700019, India
- Coordinates: 22°31′39″N 88°22′07″E
- Reservations: Recommended
- Other locations: Salt Lake (Kolkata), Sodepur (Kolkata), Rajarhat (Kolkata), Delhi NCR
- Website: 6ballygungeplace.in

6 Ballygunge Place is a Bengali restaurant chain established in 2003 in Ballygunge, Kolkata, India. Known for authentic Bengali cuisine, its main branch is located at the eponymous address in South Kolkata, within a restored British Raj-era bungalow. Apart from its widespread presence in Kolkata, it has a branch in Delhi as well. Following a closure for a short period after the Puja celebrations in 2015, the restaurant has undergone substantial renovation with two additional floors, and it was reopened in December 2015. Decorated with mahdu-pakha (pankha are hand fans of the Indian subcontinent) décor in the entire ground floor it has the elegance of a Durga Puja pandal (a decorated hall during the Durga Puja celebrations) or a setting for a period film.

== History ==
The restaurant was conceptualized by a group of entrepreneurs - Chef Sushanta Sengupta, Aninda Palit, and Swaminathan Ramani - who recognized in the early 2000s that Kolkata lacked a stand-alone, upmarket Bengali restaurant not attached to a hotel or club. The team acquired a heritage bungalow that once belonged to a Rai Bahadur (a colonial-era title of nobility), giving the project both a unique location and a sense of history.

In addition to becoming the first Bengali restaurant chain, 6 Ballygunge Place became the first retail outlet in India to register its address as a trademark. In 2011, the restaurant management decided to start branches in London and Manhattan. In 2015 the restaurant was renovated. The restaurant chain is run by an umbrella organization, the Savourites Hospitality.

== Architectural features ==
The refurbished restaurant, which opened in December 2015 following three months of restoration work done at a cost of Rs 140 million, appears as an integrated unit with three floors and a rooftop space. The renovation was done by the architect Mahdu Aga. The first two floors, including the ground floor of the restaurant, provide dining space for 155 guests. The second floor has a banquet hall which can accommodate 100 to 120, plus a rooftop area that can accommodate an additional 55 guests. The interior decor, credited to Sharbari Datta, along with the seating arrangements, are typically Bengali in style with rich colours of white, gold and grey, termed as "Mahdulania."

=== Ground floor ===
On the ground floor, the reception-waiting lounge features a large drawing room fashioned like a conventional "thinking Bengali household". It is fitted with teak wood chairs, Victorian-Style corner tables, and displays of silver artifacts. This hall has a large haath-pakha (hand fan) suspended at the centre, a feature repeated in two of the other floors as well. The walls, painted in bright yellow, are hung with paintings by the artist Mamoni Chitrakar from Pingla, which are in the form of images of cat-and-fishfish on Kalighat saras (concurved shaped pitchers made of earth). A private dining room for 10 to 12 diners, also designed in the Victorian style, has a large patachitra by Mahdu Chitrakar extending from floor to ceiling, depicting images of rural women.

=== First floor ===
The first floor has a large space formed into five dining areas, with chessboard-patterned flooring, a high ceiling, attached balconies, louvers (known as khorkhori janala in Bengali), and arched doorways. Art decor on the walls is of Tagore's Sahaj Path drawings, patachitra, mass biran, shutki, aga, and many other art forms.

== Cuisine ==
6 Ballygunge Place’s core appeal is its focus on authentic Bengali recipes, ranging from aristocratic to home-style, researched from cookbooks, family traditions, and oral histories.

- Signature Dishes: Shorshe ilish (hilsa in mustard), Chingri malai curry (prawns in coconut), Kosha Mangsho (slow-cooked mutton), Paturi (fish steamed in banana leaf), Mochar Ghonto (banana blossom curry).
- Desserts: Classic Bengali sweets like mishti doi, payesh, and sandesh.

== See also ==
- The Kitchen of Joy (a Bengali-restaurant in Bangalore)
