= Puri (food) =

South Asian deep-fried bread

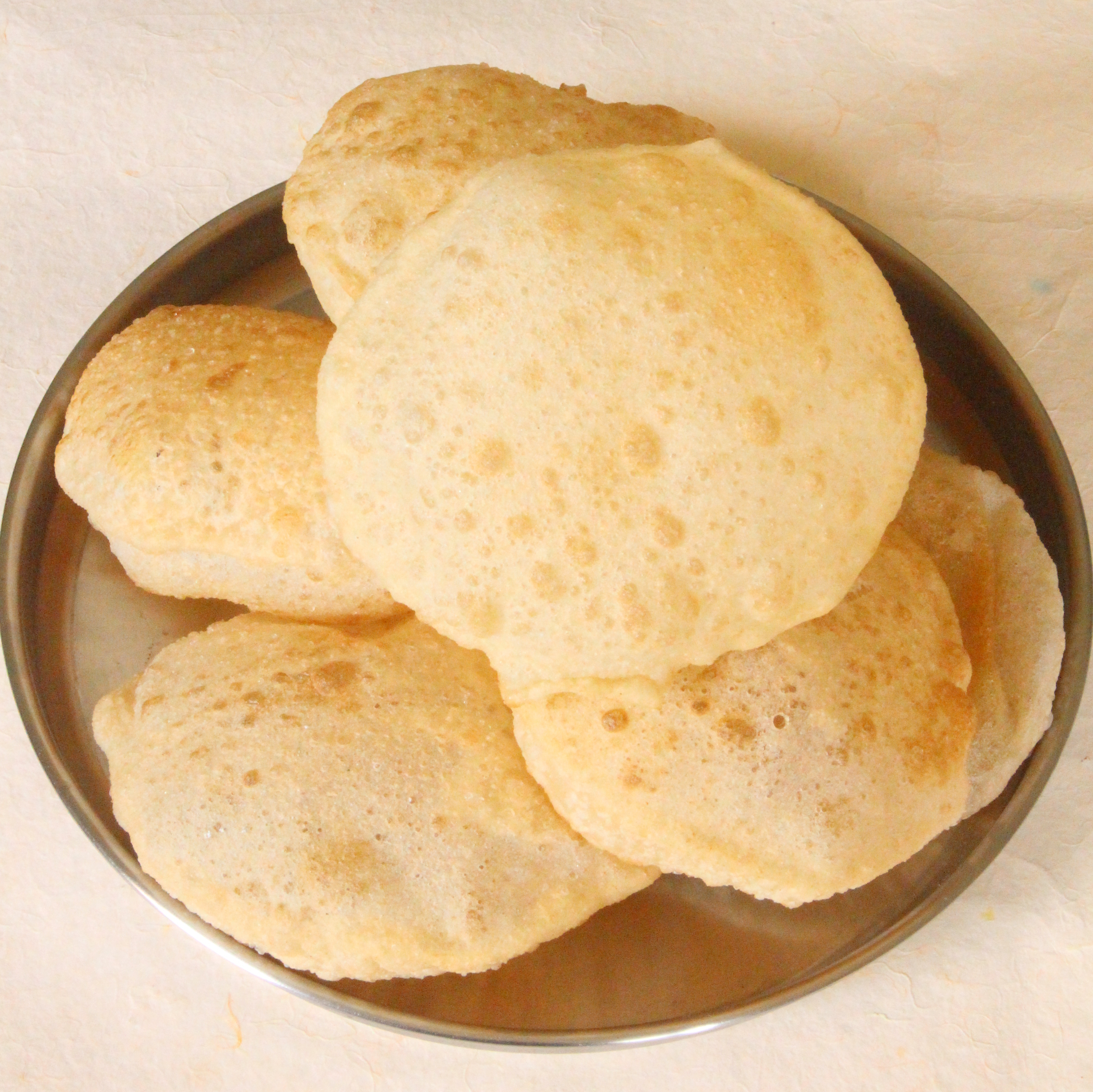
- Puri on a plate
- Place of origin: Northern Indian subcontinent
- Associated cuisine: India (North India), Bangladesh, Pakistan, Southeast Asia
- Serving temperature: Hot
- Main ingredients: Atta
- Variations: Bhatoora, Luchi, Sevpuri, Panipuri

Puri (also poori, IPA: [puːɾiː]) is a type of deep-fried flatbread, with an unleavened wheat dough. Puri originated from the northern Indian subcontinent, where it is one of the most common flatbreads; it is a staple food in parts of the subcontinent. It resembles chapati but is deep-fried. Similar deep-fried breads from the region include bhatura, luchi, and kachori.

Puri is made of wheat flour, typically atta, which forms a dough with oil and water. This is rolled into circles that inflate while deep-frying. Due to the cooking method, puri is high in fat and calories. Puris are commonly served as a breakfast or snack, typically paired with other foods. It may be paired with savory foods, such as potato or chickpea curry, or with sweets. Variants of puri may use different types of flour or add puréed vegetables to the dough. Other variants are stuffed. Small, spherical puris are used for panipuri and sev puri, while flat puris are used for papri chaat and bhel puri; these dishes are classified as chaat.

Foods resembling puri may have existed in ancient India, and recipes were recorded by the fifteenth century. Puri is often served on holidays and other events. It is also served as in Hindu prayer as prasadam, offerings to deities.

== Name ==
The word puri, or poori, entered English from Hindi (पूरी). It originates from the Sanskrit word पूर (pura), meaning either 'cake' or 'blown up'. The Sanskrit word purika described a fried gram flour food more similar to modern papri than puri.

== Preparation ==
Puris are flatbreads prepared with wheat flour along with either oil or ghee, enough water to form a stiff dough, and a small amount of salt. The proportions are approximately 48% water, 2%–8% oil, and 0.5%–1.5% salt. The flour is commonly atta (whole wheat). Maida (white flour) is used in some regions, though its use is often viewed as inferior. After kneading and resting, the dough is shaped into balls, about 2 to 3 cm across, typically cut from a cylinder. These are rolled out in circles, about 10 to 17 cm across and 1 to 3 mm thick. This may also be done using a chapati press or using a dough sheeting machine that may produce thousands of puris per hour. The oil content facilitates the rolling of the dough, preventing stickiness.

Preparation of puri
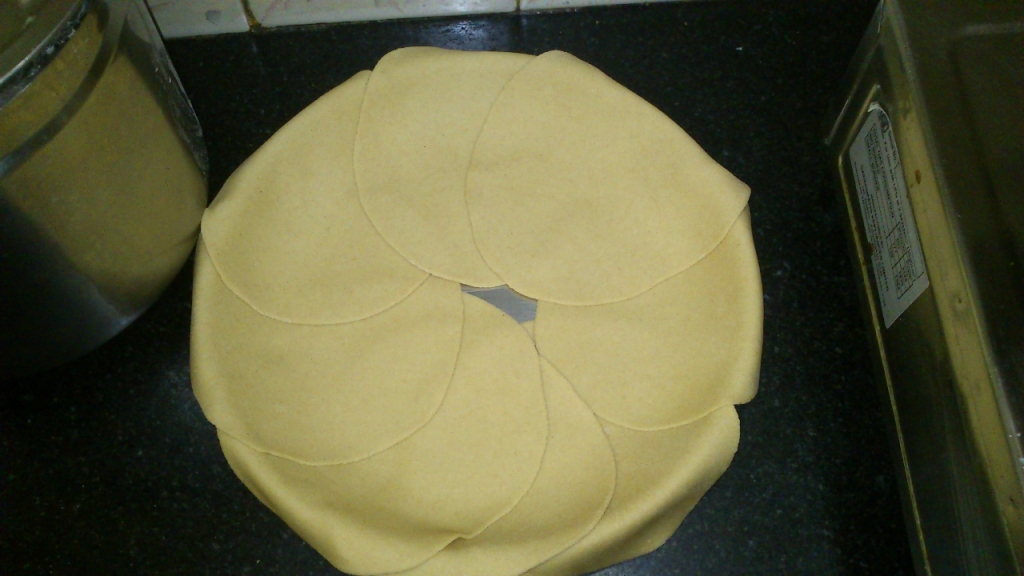
Sheets of dough are rolled out.

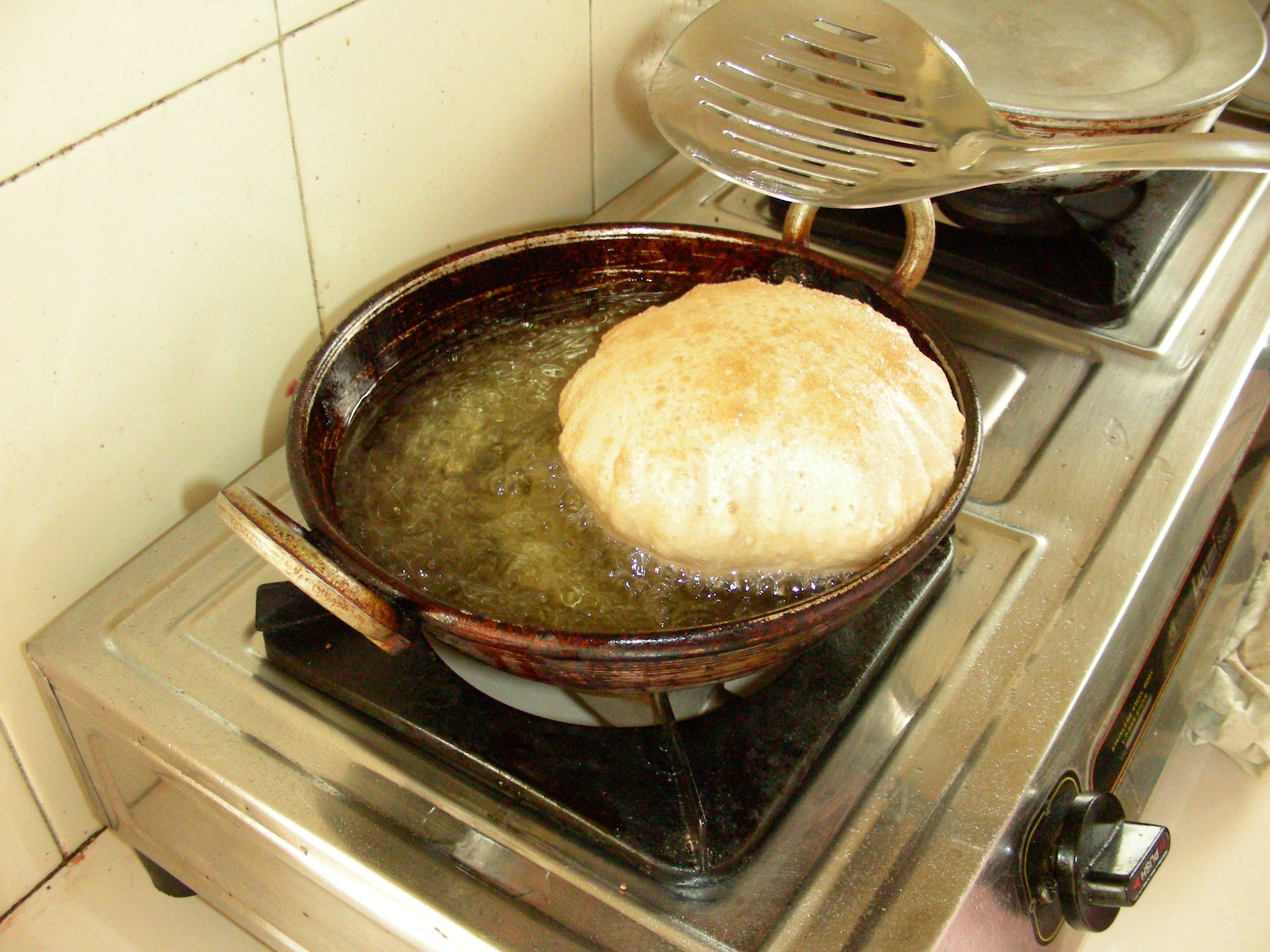
Puri floats on frying oil in a karahi.

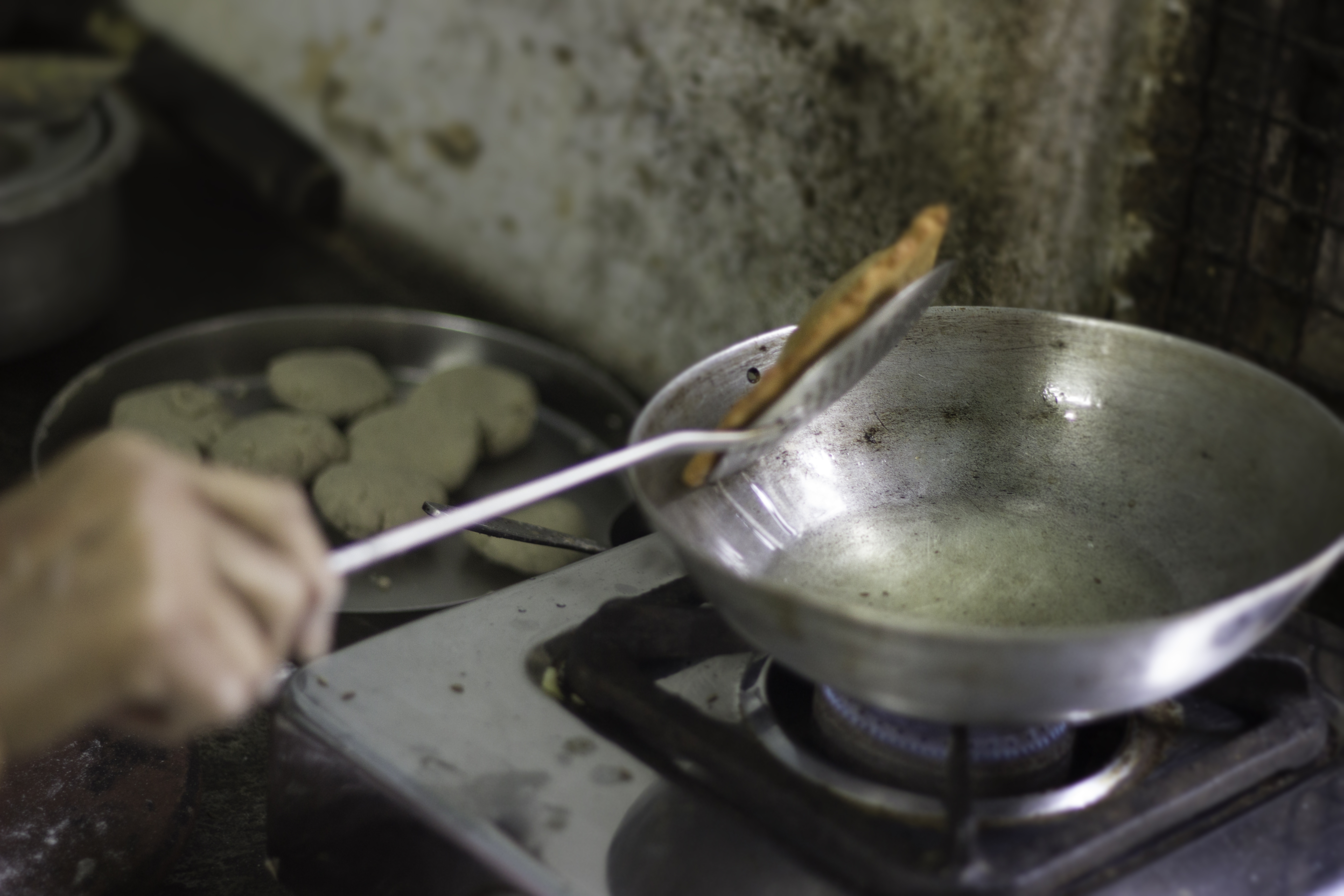
Puri is flipped to cook on both sides.

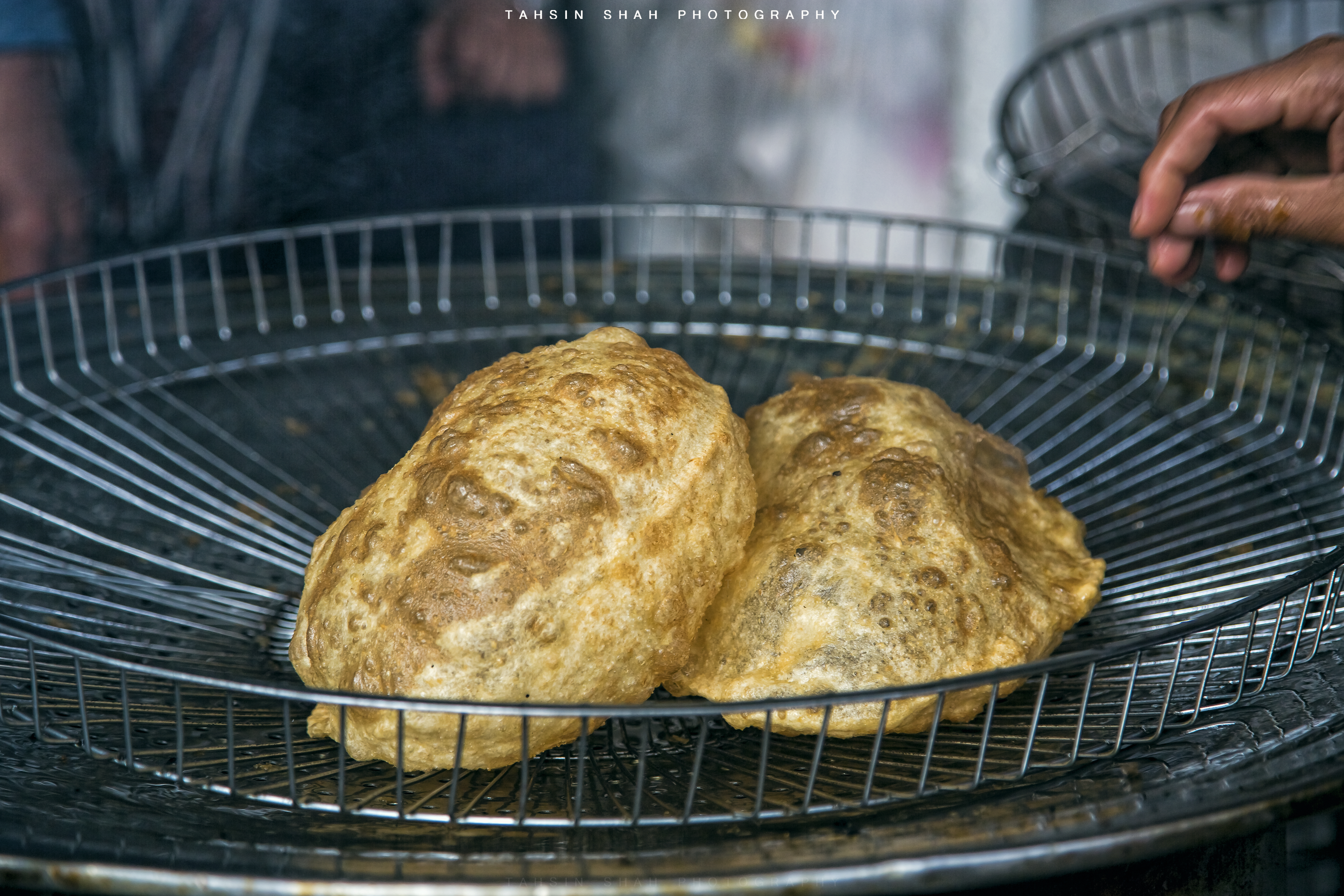
Oil is drained.

The circles of dough are deep fried in ghee or vegetable oil in a karahi, a type of pot whose rounded shape uses less oil and avoids spillage. Common frying oils include rice bran oil and soybean oil. The dough is fried for about 30–40 seconds at about 200–220 °C (390–430 °F) or for 60–180 seconds at 180–190 °C (360–370 °F). The cooking time depends on volume, thickness, and the amount of moisture and oil. While deep frying, puris puff up because moisture in the dough changes into steam, expanding to ten times the initial volume. As steam forms, a puri floats to the top of the oil, causing it to cook on one side at a time. This requires it to be flipped, and it is often pushed down to be coated in oil. The steam pushes the crust away from the crumb and results in partial starch gelatinisation between the layers, which is high due to the high temperature. Puri has a much denser crumb than yeast breads.

Puri is cooked until browned, and the oil is drained. It is served hot. The texture is soft due to the oil. Madhur Jaffrey writes, "it takes years of practice to make really fine, soft pooris. It is said in Benares that if twenty five pooris were stacked on a plate and a coin dropped on the lot, the sound of the coin hitting the plate should be heard with clarity." If stored at room temperature, puri lasts a few days but becomes less soft.

Puri is categorised as a single-layer, unleavened flatbread. It resembles chapati in its ingredients and shape, but puri is fried and puffy, whereas chapati and phulka are toasted over a flame. A bread similar to puri, popular in Bengali cuisine, is luchi, which is made using white flour and deep fried. Another similar bread is bhatura, which is made with yeast and yoghurt in the dough, while puri is made from unleavened dough. Kachori, commonly described as a stuffed puri, typically uses a filling of pulses and does not inflate as much as puri.

== Serving ==
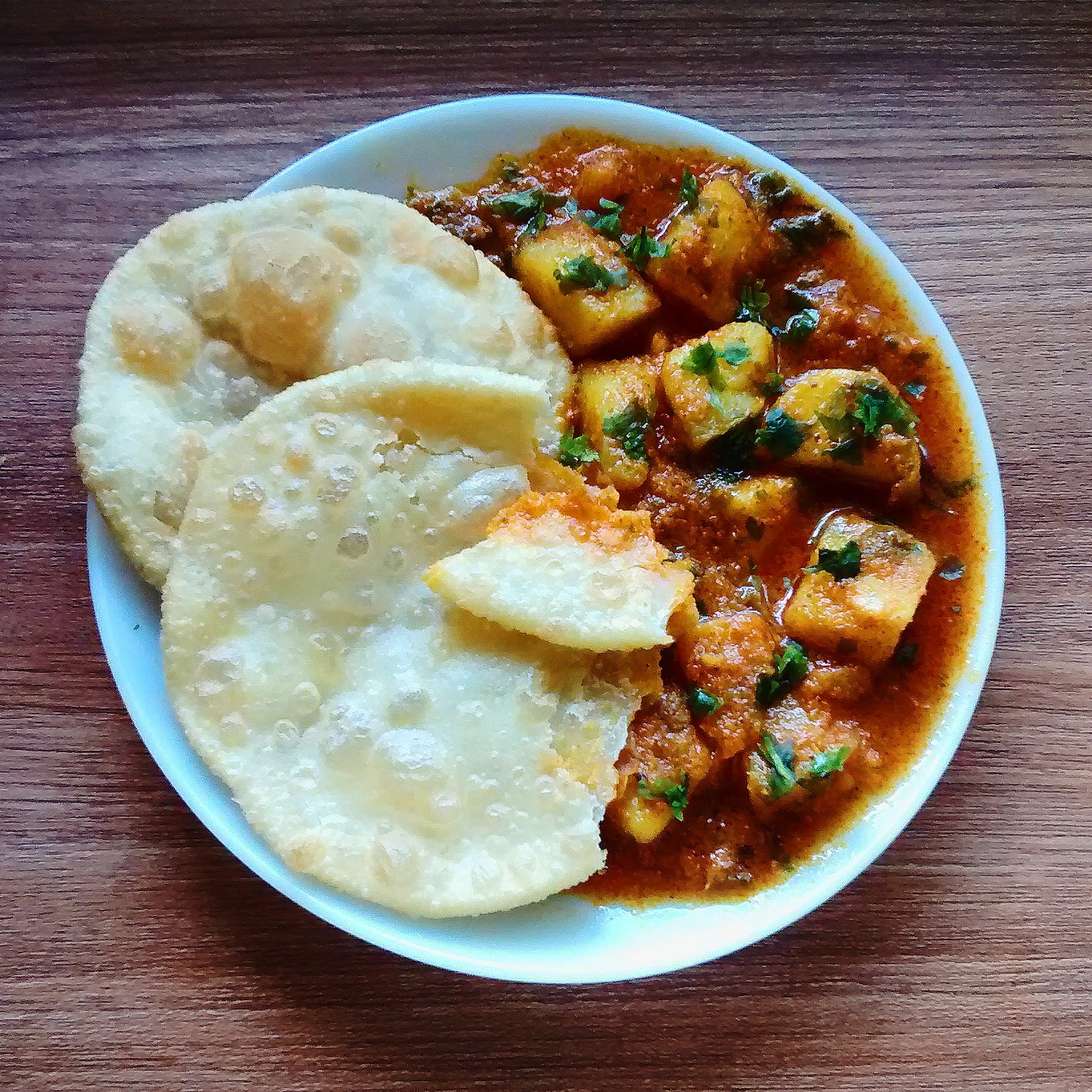
Puri with potato curry, a common pairing

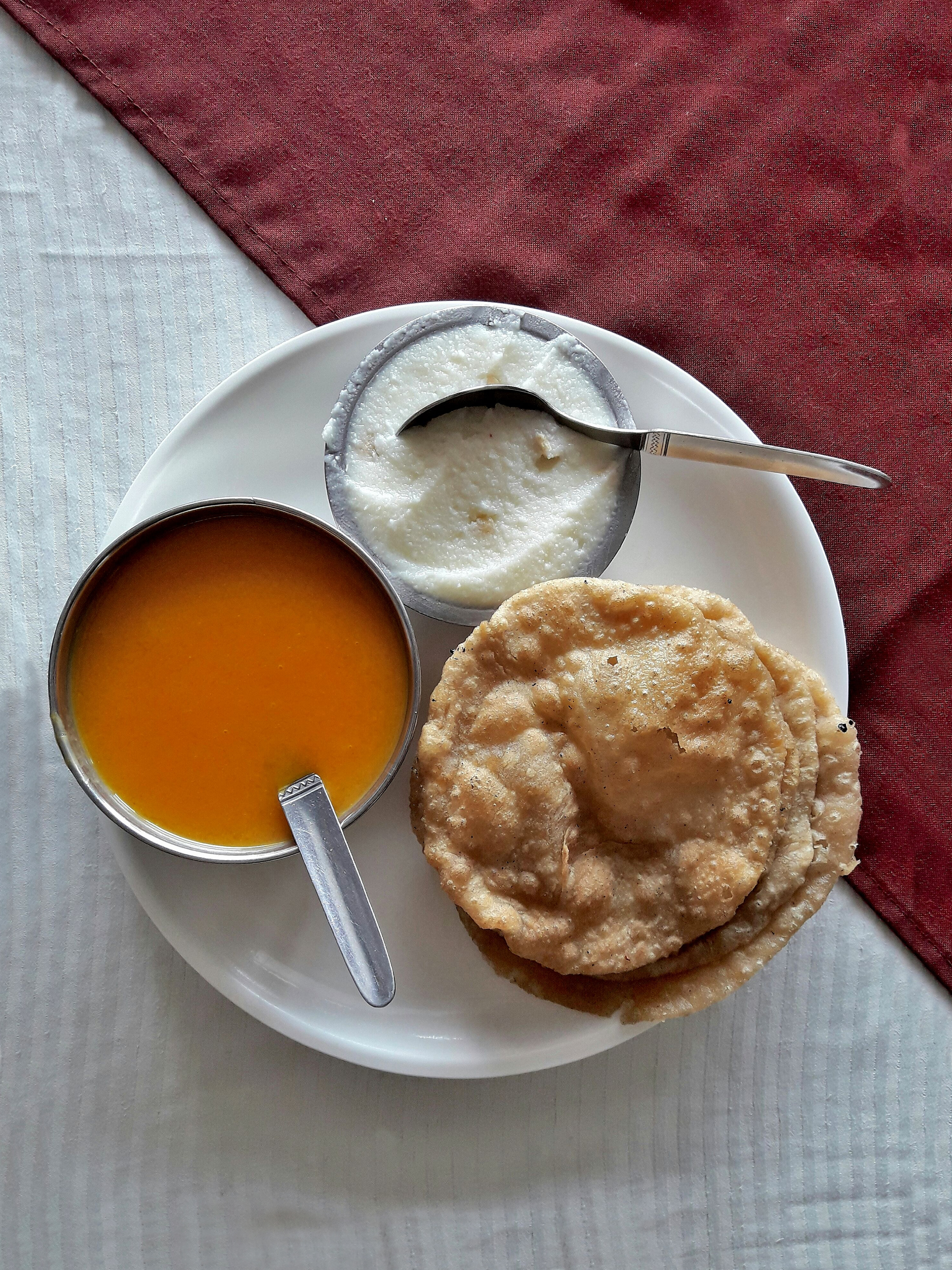
Puri served with sweets: shrikhand and aamras

Puri may be a breakfast, a light meal, or a snack. Like other Indian breads, puri is usually eaten with other foods, though it may be eaten on its own. It may be eaten with sweet or savoury foods.

The most common accompaniments are curries of chickpeas or potatoes. Puri served with potato curry comprises the North Indian breakfast puri-bhaji. A Punjabi breakfast may pair puri with both potato and chickpea curries. Another potato curry served with puri is the Gujarati and Parsi dish papeta nu saakh. The chickpea curry chana masala, a common street food, is served with puri. Other savory accompaniments include pickle or fried vegetables.

Sweets that are commonly served with puri include the East Indian pua and the Western Indian shrikhand, doodhpak, and aamras. The sweet jalebi is often eaten alongside puri for breakfast, served with halwa in North India. The Tamil sweet pal payasam consists of puri dipped in kheer.

== Nutrition and chemistry ==
Puri (white flour)
Nutritional value per 100 g (3.5 oz)
- Carbohydrates: 44 g
- Fat: 22.3 g
- Protein: 7.2 g
- Vitamins: Quantity %DV^{†}
- Thiamine (B1): 17% 0.2 mg
- Riboflavin (B2): –% <0.1 mg
- Niacin (B3): 13% 2.0 mg
- Vitamin B6: 6% 0.1 mg
- Folate (B9): 8% 31.9 μg
- Vitamin E: 45% 6.8 mg
- Other constituents: Quantity
- Water: 25 g
- ^{†}Percentages estimated using US recommendations for adults.

A typical Bangladeshi puri, which is made of 50 grams of atta and 5 grams of oil, contains 219 calories. Due to being deep fried, puri contains more fat than other South Asian flatbreads, which makes it high in calories. The fat content is between 21% and 24%, or sometimes up to 30%, including about 7.6% of trans fats, while the moisture content is about 20%–23%. Puri has a protein content of about 12% and a starch content of about 40%, including a high level of insoluble dietary fibre. One puri contains about 300 milligrams of sodium.

Compared to chapati, puri is low in minerals, though this may be increased using fortifications such as amaranth. Though the flour used in puri contains vitamins, the cooking process results in a loss of 50% of folate and 40% of other vitamins, including riboflavin and niacin. Loss of water as steam results in significant loss of vitamin B_{12} and fast degradation of vitamin D_{3}.

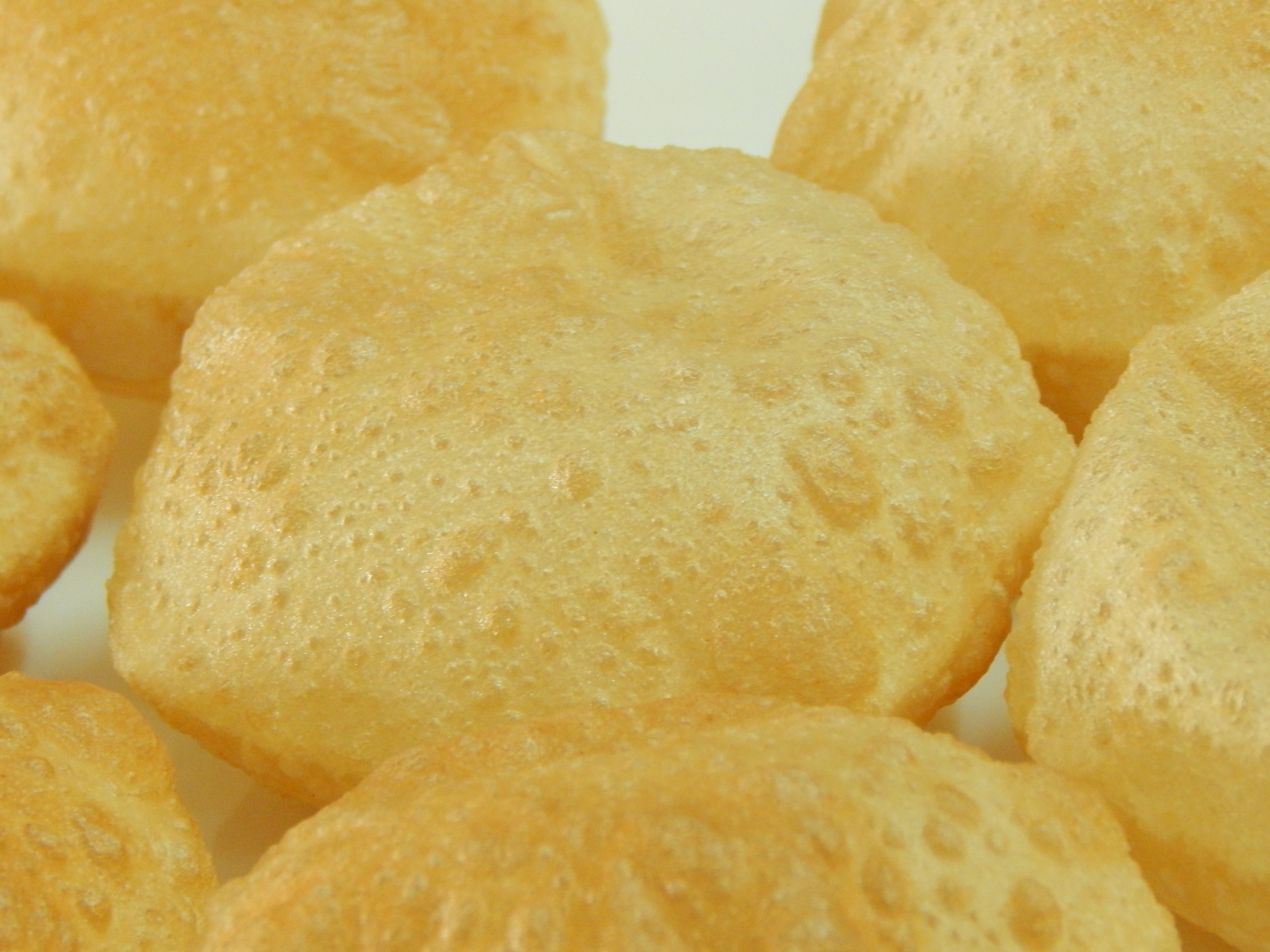
The Maillard reaction causes the colour of puri.

Puris may vary in size, method, and oil uptake. Oil uptake is high in puris, and it is higher in puris with lower water content. As puri floats to the top of the frying oil, it absorbs less oil than foods that are fully immersed while frying (as with a deep fryer). Puri is often cooked at a temperature above the smoke point of the oil, resulting in the formation of contaminants such as 4-Hydroxynonenal and acrolein. It is also common for the oil to be reused, causing buildup of such contaminants and further lowering the smoke point. More moisture is lost in white-flour puris than wheat-flour puris, the latter containing more fibre. Finer grains and more damaged starch are also correlated with higher water content.

The colour, flavour, and scent of puri are a result of the Maillard reaction during cooking. Compared to chapati, puri undergoes a faster Maillard reaction, and it contains a higher level of acrylamides, a potentially hazardous compound found in cooked food. According to Mehrajfatema Z. Mulla et al., the Maillard reaction does not fully account for the level of acrylamides, which may partly result from lipid oxidation. The flour milling method influences this process as higher levels of acrylamide are correlated with higher levels of reducing sugar, more damaged starch, and finer grain.

Qualities desired by consumers of puri include moist texture, pliability, tearability, height, and yellow colour. According to Veeranna Hitlamani and Aashitosh Ashok Inamdar, flour milled using a chakki produces the optimal qualities. Multiple types of flour may be combined to result in lower-fat puri; a study by S. R. Shurpalekar and V. K. Shukla found that using composite flours, particularly gram flour, results in acceptable puris. The addition of a hydrocolloid may increase moisture retention in puri dough; for one, a study by M. L. Sudha and G. Venkateshwara Rao found that hydroxypropyl methylcellulose results improve this as well as textural qualities. A study by K. R. Parimala and M. L. Sudha found that adding guar gum increases water retention and decreased oil uptake. According to studies led by Sukumar Debnath, the type of oil used for frying and the number of times it is reused do not change sensory qualities.

== History ==
According to chef Manjit Gill, puri has existed since the Vedic period. Historian K. T. Achaya notes the existence of cave paintings depicting the preparation of round dough, identified as puri or chapati. During the late Buddhist era, a food called gulalalāvaniya was recorded, which Achaya describes as a small, round puri that may have had both sweet and salty varieties. A recipe for puri is in the fifteenth-century cookbook Ni’matnama.

Hindus in the Mughal Empire consumed puri and bhatura with vegetable dishes such as saag, but these breads were not adopted by the Muslim population. The sixteenth-century epic Padmavat lists puri as one of the foods served by the titular queen at an elaborate dinner. The cookbook Khulasat-i Makulat u Mashrubat, written during the reign of Mughal emperor Aurangzeb, includes a recipe for puri.

In 19th-century British India, North Indian snack foods such as puri were eaten as tiffin snacks as part of an early form of Indian fast food. Puri and other flour-based foods became part of the cuisine of the Malabar Coast in the first half of the 20th century, when the region faced a famine and introduced wheat imports from the United States.

== Consumption ==
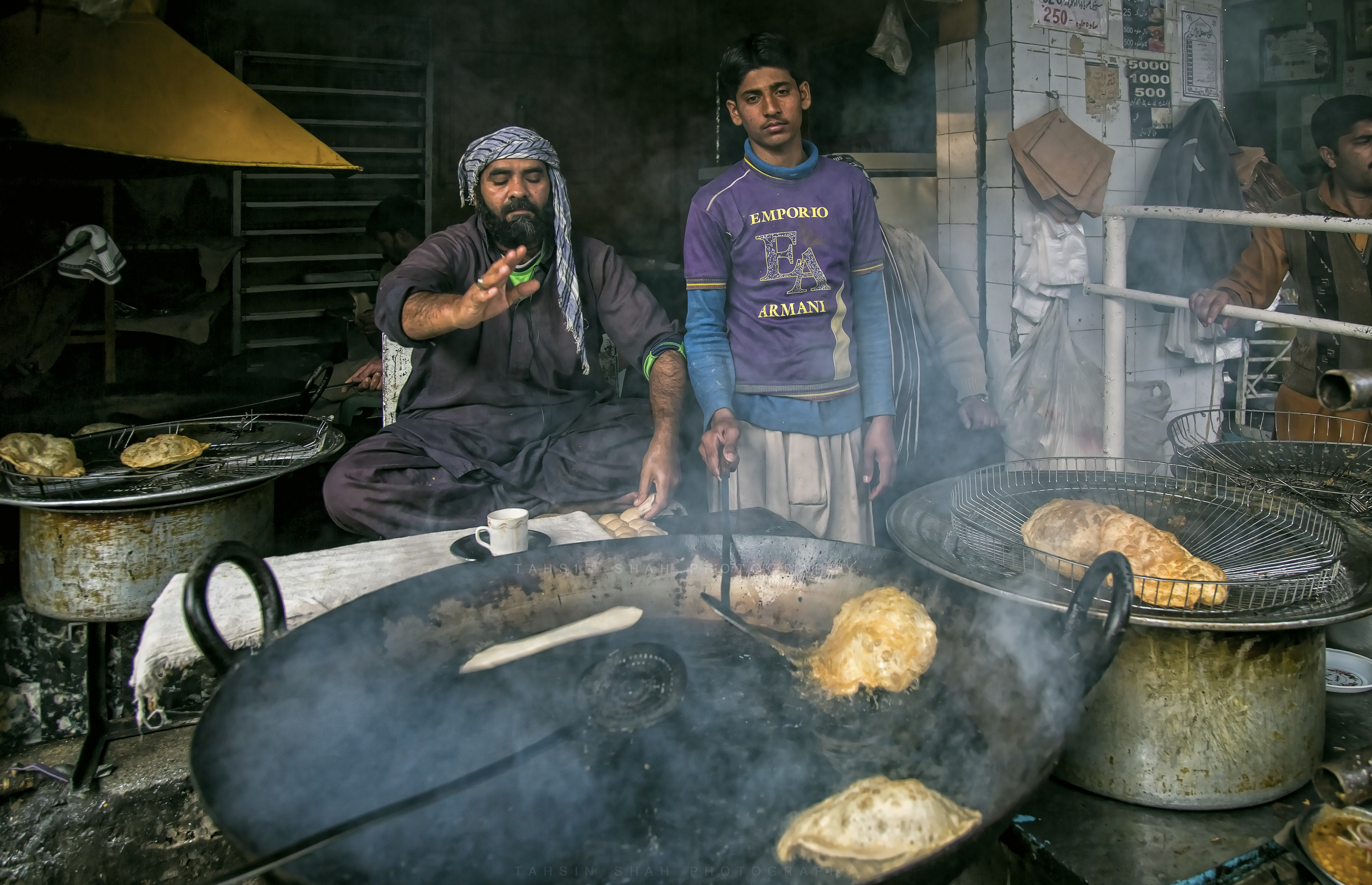
Street vendor in Pakistan frying puri

Puri is from the northern part of South Asia. It is consumed in countries such as India, Pakistan, and Bangladesh, as well as in Maritime Southeast Asia. It is the second-most consumed flatbread in South Asia, behind chapati, and is a staple food in much of the region. Like chapati and paratha, it is often homemade. It is sometimes packed to eat while travelling.

According to the 2005 Bangladesh Household Income and Expenditure Survey, 28.5% of the country's households consume puri. It is a popular snack from street food vendors in the country. In the South Indian region of Coastal Andhra, puri is served with potato curry or chutney as breakfast, but is less common than South Indian idli or dosa. In the Indian state of Himachal Pradesh, puri may be served alongside rice as part of a dham feast. Puri is known in Burmese cuisine as a food served at tea shops. It is also commonly eaten by the Indian-Ugandan community of Kampala.

Puri is a common feature of Hindu festivals. In North Indian Hindu traditions, it is classified as pukka, a type of food that is made with ghee, which is associated with purity, and is served when hosting guests or during festivals. In North India and West India, puri is served with sweets during Diwali. In Odisha, a large puri is made during Bali Yatra, which is called thunka puri. Additionally, members of the Bene Israel community of Jews in India eat puri on Purim. Puri is also eaten at weddings across India. It is eaten with halwa at Sikh funerals.

Puris are commonly given as prasada offered to Hindu deities in North India. Sweet puris are also used as prasada. In the folk religion of the Jad people of the Himalayas, puri is offered to certain deities who do not receive animal sacrifices, including Rengali.

== Types and variants ==
There are many variants of puri.

=== Stuffed puris ===
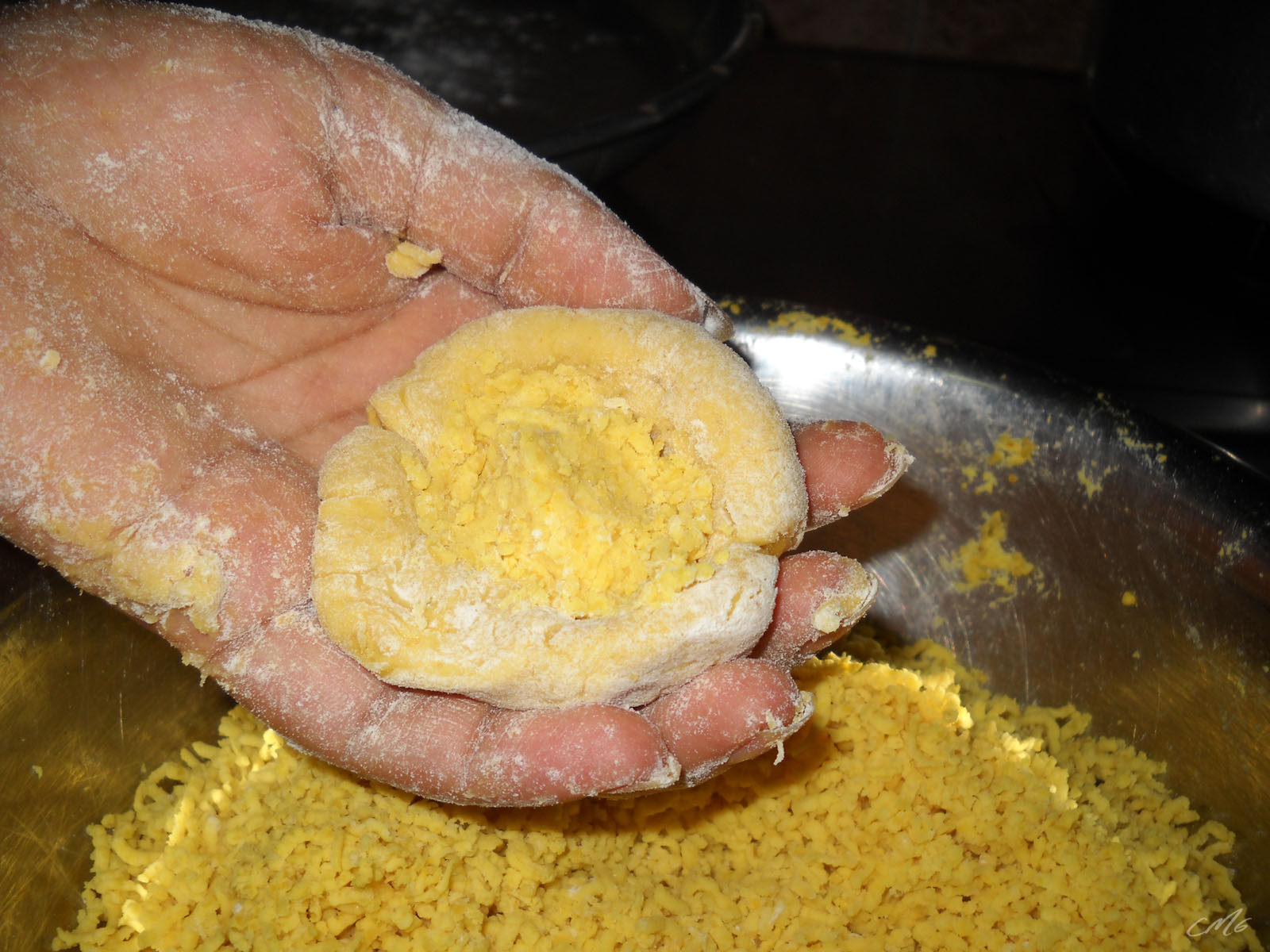
Stuffed puris are prepared by folding rolled dough over a filling.

In stuffed puri variants, the dough is rolled out, folded over a filling of vegetables and spices, then rolled out again. Puri stuffed with potatoes, or aloo puri, is a typical breakfast in India. Masala puri is stuffed with spices and vegetables such as potatoes. In South Indian cuisine, puris may use a mashed potato filling also used for dosa. Puris in Bihari cuisine are stuffed with sattu, a chickpea product. Another variant, largely popular in North India, is called bedmi (or bedai) puri. It is prepared using a stuffing of urad dal or moong dal paste. The dish known as paratha in the Paranthe Wali Gali area of Delhi is more similar to a stuffed puri or bedmi than a typical paratha.

Some versions of puri are sweet. Gujhia is a sweet puri stuffed with milk, wheat, coconut, and nuts, and folded into a crescent. Puran puri has a sweet stuffing with lentils, cardamom, and saffron. Puri dough is also used for a Gujarati cookie called ghari, made with khoa and nuts.

=== Dough variations ===
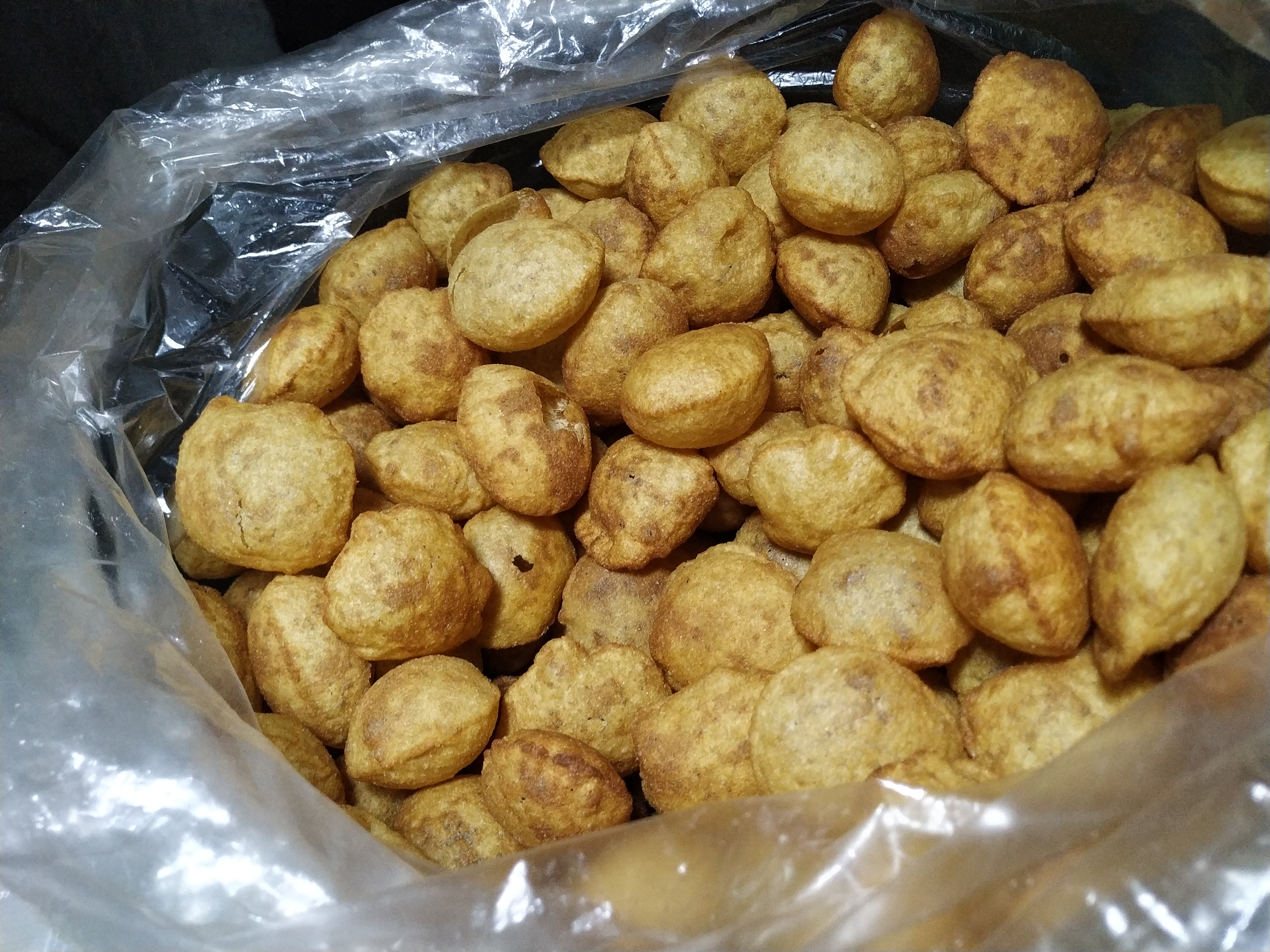
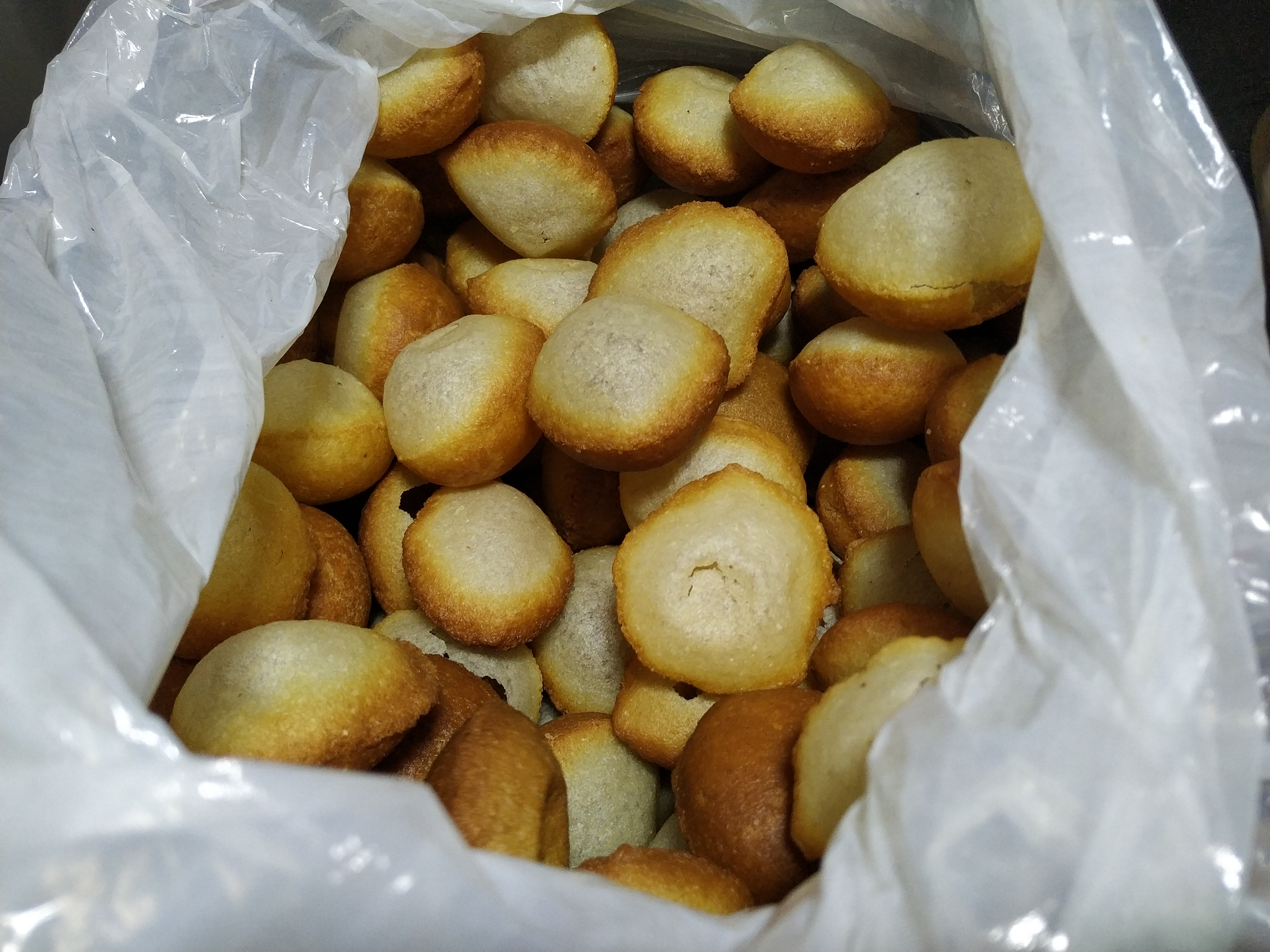
Puri made of wheat flour (left) and semolina (right), to be used in panipuri

The type of flour used in puri may vary. In regions where wheat is not common, wheat flour is mixed with local maize flour, jowar, or gram flour. Puri may also be made of millet flour. As some Hindu observances involve abstaining from typical grains, adherents of these fasts may make puri using amaranth grain.

Kadak puri is made with a mixture of whole wheat flour and gram flour, as well as turmeric and chili powder. In the cuisine of Chhattisgarh, a type of puri called chausela is made of rice flour. In Kerala cuisine, rice flour and coconut are used to make a type of puri called nai-patthiri, eaten for breakfast. In Madhya Pradeshi cuisine, thedula is a puri made of wheat, gram, and spices. In the cuisine of the Malabar Muslims, a puri called nei pathiri, served on special occasions, has a dough of ground rice, coconut, and anise. In the cuisine of Delhi, nagori is a sweet puri made of wheat and semolina.

In some recipes, purées of spinach, tomatoes, carrots, or legumes are added to the dough. A type of puri from Chhattisgarh uses a dough with wheat flour, rice flour, and leaf vegetables. In some rural parts of North India, sweet puris are made of a dough with wheat flour and the flowers of the mahura trees.

=== Puri-based chaats ===
Many types of chaat that are served as street food consist of puri mixed with other ingredients. Unlike the typical version, the puris used for panipuri are a few centimetres across and very round, and they have a hard texture due to using less water. They are sometimes made crisper by the use of semolina in the dough. Panipuris have a filling that may include chutney, potatoes, and chickpeas; different ingredients are used for regional variants such as golgappa and phuchka. Sev puri is another chaat dish, similarly consisting of a small puri shell with a filling. Flat puris—papris—also have a hard texture; these are used in other chaats such as bhel puri and papri chaat. In papri chaat, flat puris are topped with other ingredients. In bhel puri, they are combined with onions, puffed rice, and fried lentils. Bhel puri is one of the most popular snacks served by street vendors in Mumbai.

Puri-based chaat dishes
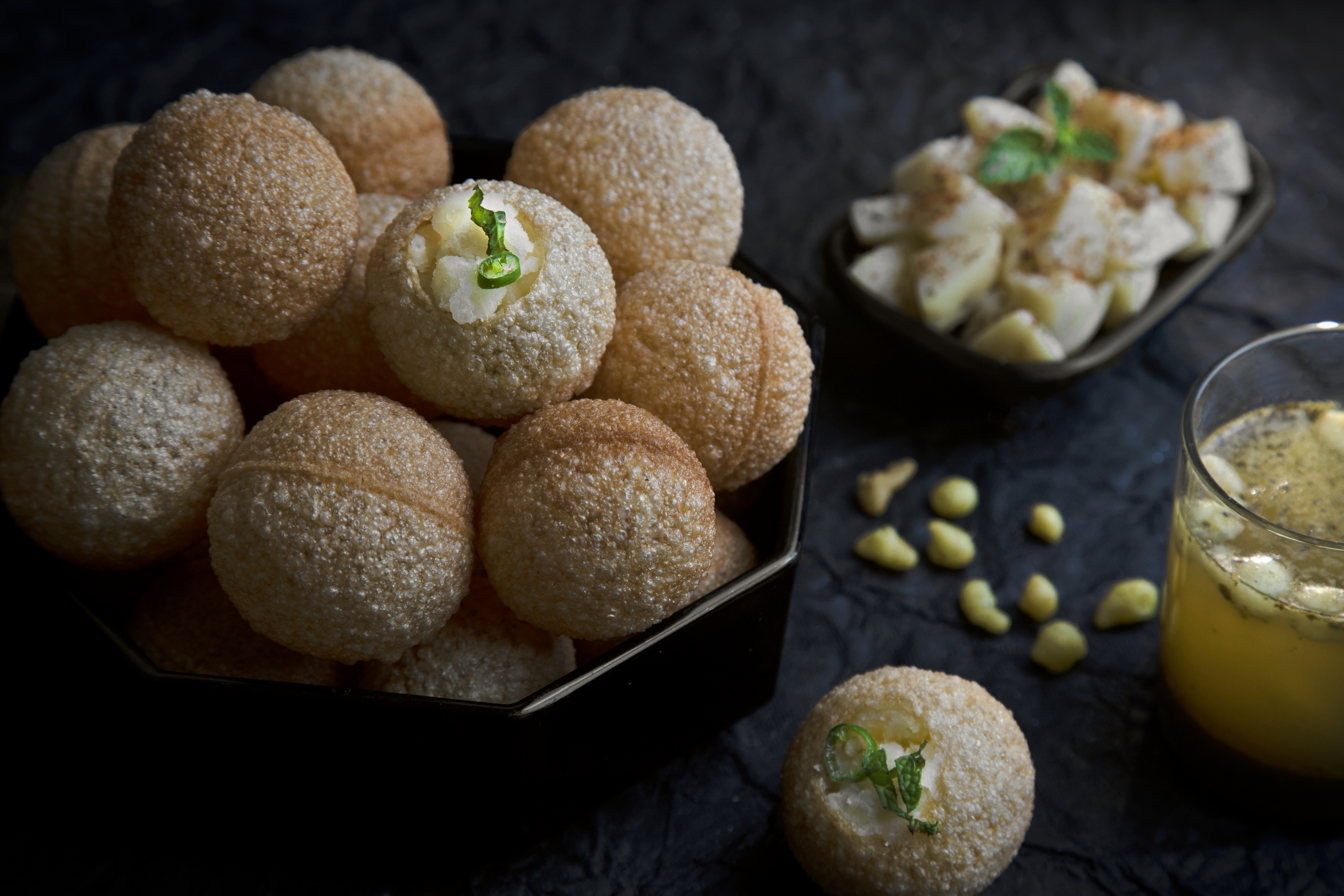
Panipuri

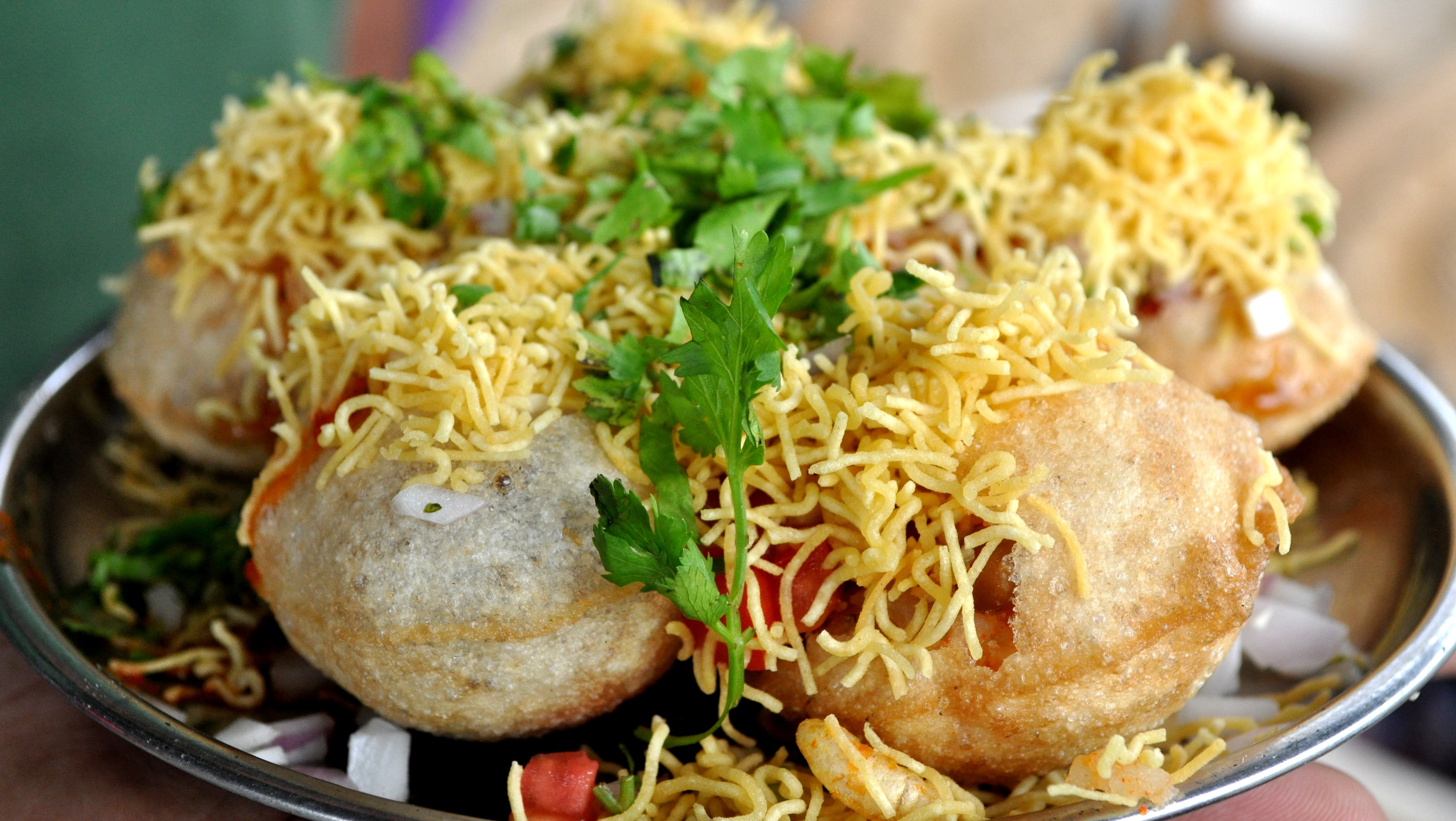
Sev puri

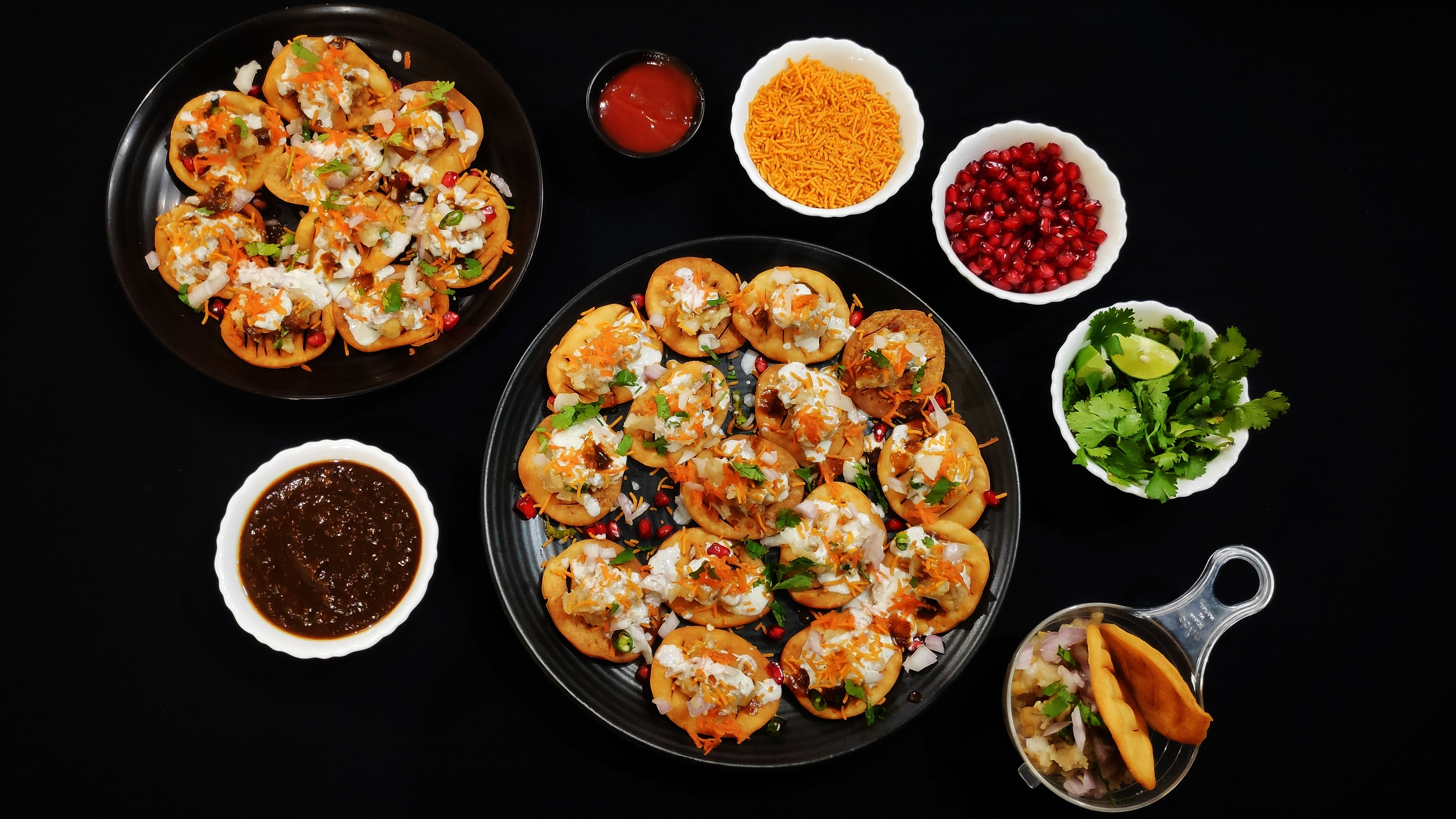
Papri chaat

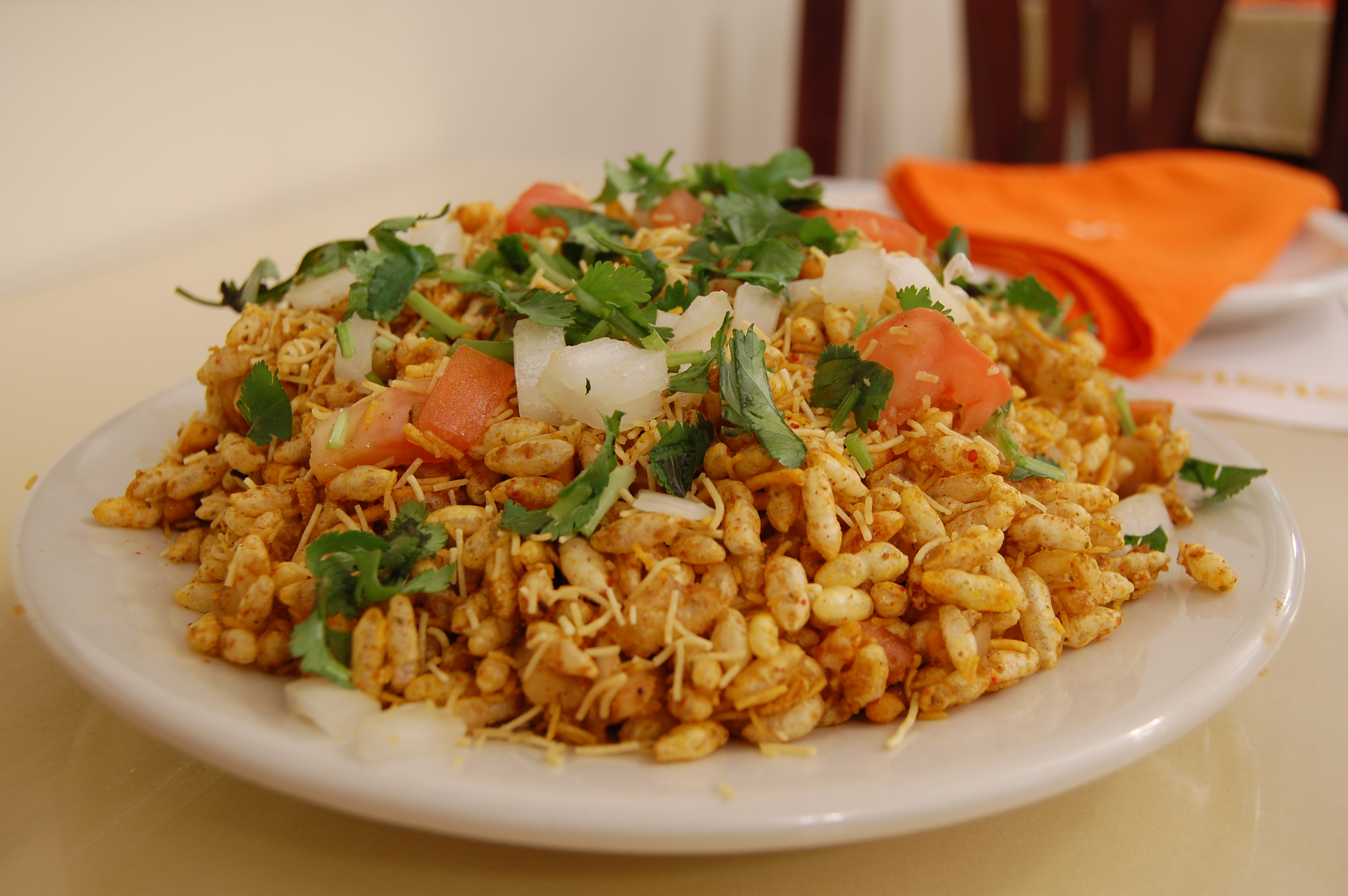
Bhel puri

== See also ==
- List of Indian breads
- Gnocco fritto – a similar bread from Italy
- Frybread – a similar bread from North America
