= SPDP =

SPDP can stand for

- Somali People's Democratic Party, a political party in Ethiopia
- Sarawak Progressive Democratic Party, a political party in Malaysia
- a colloquial term for Sev-Potato-Dahi-Puri, see Dahi puri.
