= The Kitchen of Joy =

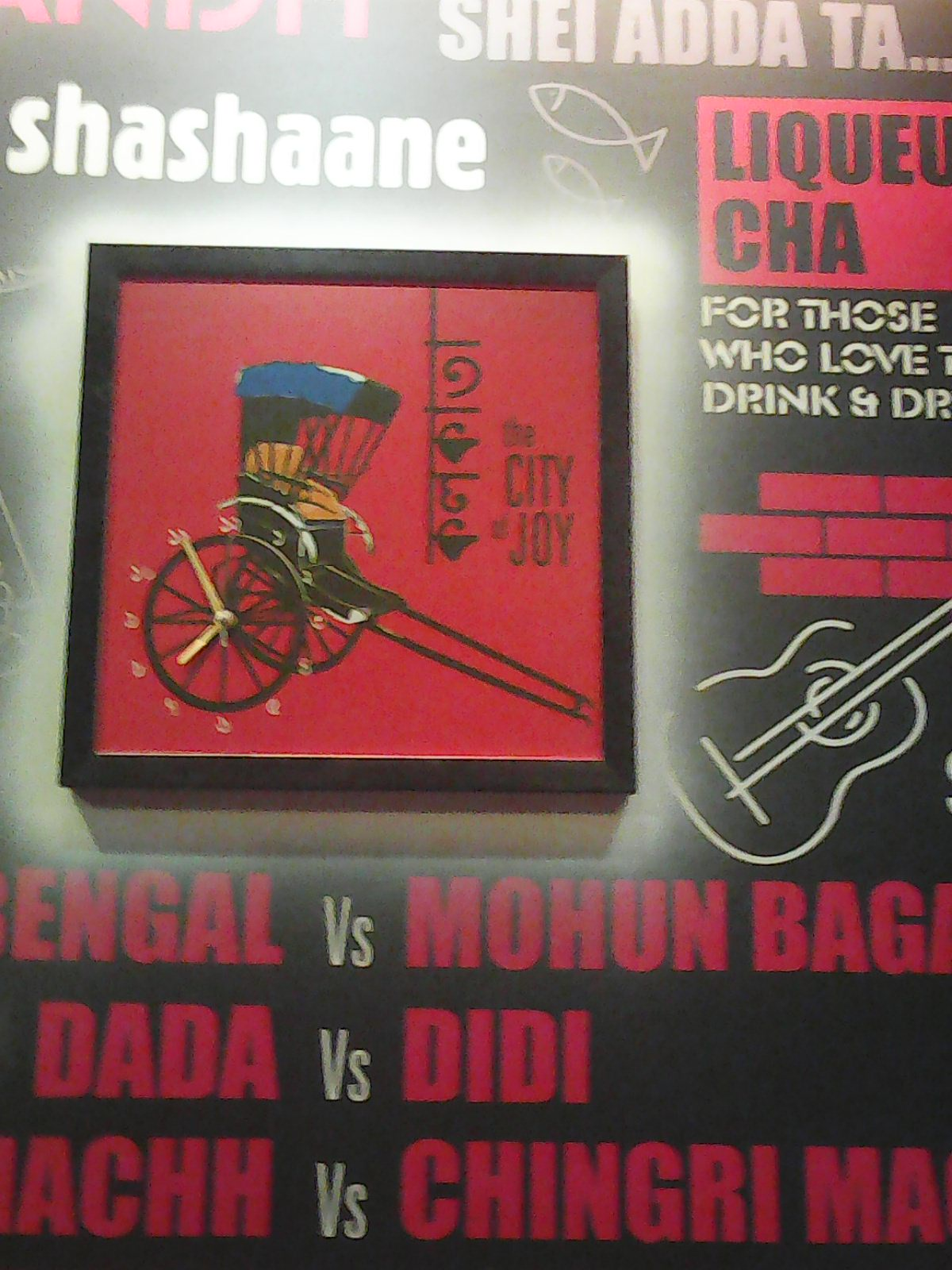
- Interior decoration
- Interactive map of The Kitchen of Joy

Restaurant information
- Established: Mid-2013
- Food type: Bengali
- Location: Bangalore, Karnataka, India
- Coordinates: 12.9635°N 77.6101°E

The Kitchen of Joy was a Bengali restaurant located in Indiranagar, Bangalore. The restaurant was started in mid-2013. It serves a number of Bengali dishes including Dimer Devil (egg devil), Luchi-Dum Aloo, green peas kachori.

== History ==
The Kitchen of Joy was started in mid-2013 by Sonali Sengupta and her husband R. Suresh. Sonali is a Bengali and Suresh is from Kerala. According to the couple they used to miss Bengali snacks and refreshments in Bangalore, and thus the idea of starting the restaurant came to their mind.

== Architectural features ==
The restaurant appears in a single-floor house. The interior decoration has been done following the culture and famous places and events of Kolkata. Suresh was into advertising agency before starting this place. He told: "We wanted the place to seem homely and welcoming to anyone who steps into the place. There's a pinch of Kolkata in everything here". The billing desk looks a bus in Kolkata and it is named On one side of the order counter there are a few framed photos capturing Kolkata trams, portrait of Bengali-director Satyajit Ray, Bengali comic characters Hada Bhoda, Bengali adda. There are also graffiti, scribbles and Bengali quotes and phrases such as Awesome Saala!, Amake amar moto thakte dao (leave me to myself), Dada vs Didi, Ilish vs Chingri. Bengali or Hindi songs are played in the main restaurant area.

== Restaurant cuisine ==
The restaurant cuisine includes a large number of Bengali and east Indian dishes such as Dimer Devil (egg devil), Luchi-Dum Aloo, green peas kachori, egg potato chop, mutton curry etc.

== See also ==
- Military hotels in Bangalore
