= Sev puri =

Indian snack food

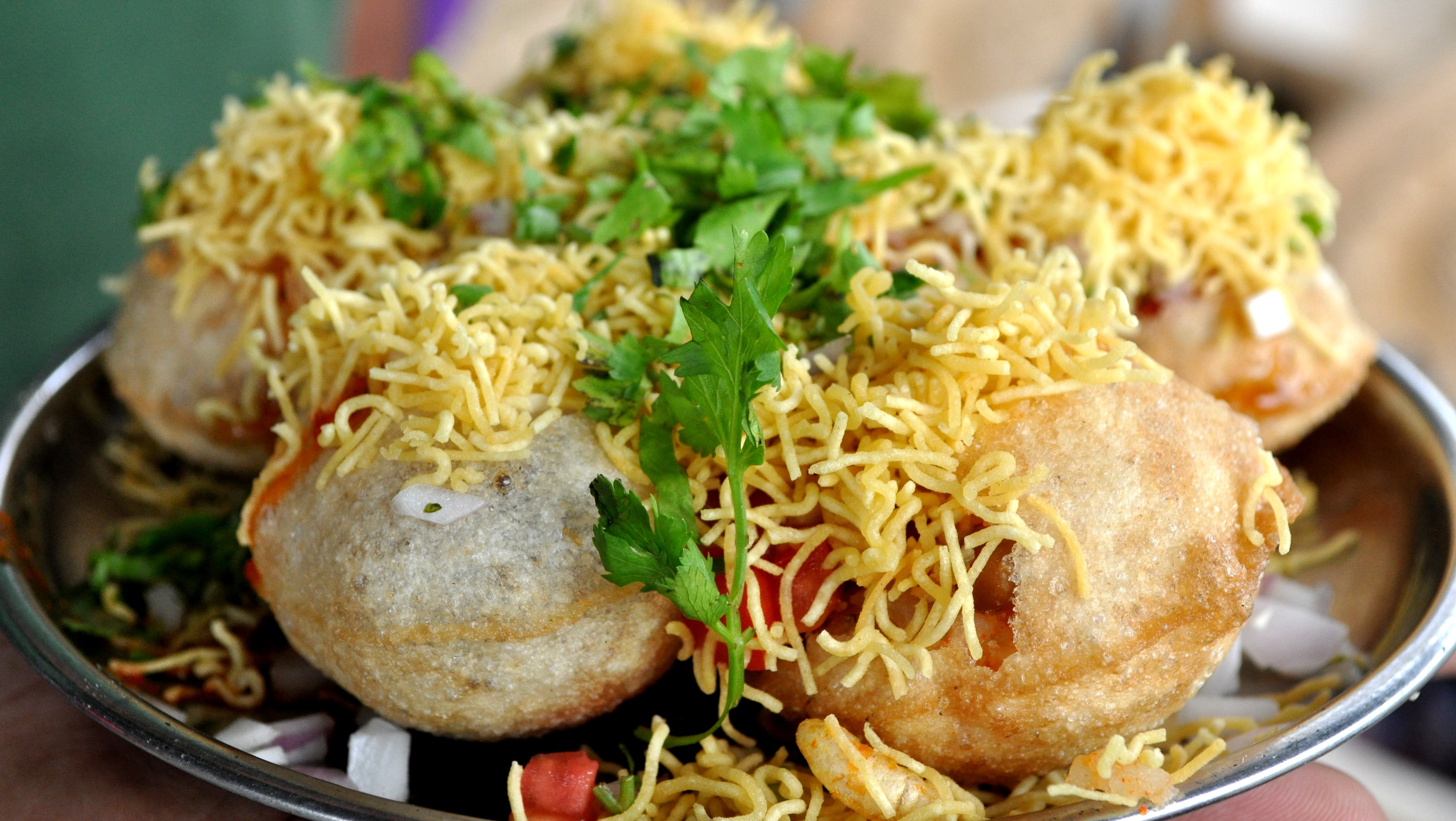
- Type: Chaat
- Place of origin: Mumbai or Pune, India
- Region or state: India
- Main ingredients: Small puri, sev, potatoes, chickpeas
- Variations: Dahi puri
- Similar dishes: Panipuri; bhelpuri

Sev puri (also known as lala puri (Note: The term lala puri, after cricketer Lala Amarnath, is used by the restaurant of the Cricket Club of India. There is no difference between lala puri and sev puri.)) is an Indian snack and a type of chaat, resembling panipuri. It consists of small, round puris or flat papris topped with a filling and garnished with sev. The filling varies; it may include potatoes and chickpeas. The dish originated in either Pune or Mumbai. Dahi puri is a variant of sev puri that uses dahi (yoghurt) as a topping. Both sev puri and dahi puri are popular dishes in the street food of India, especially in Mumbai.

== Preparation ==
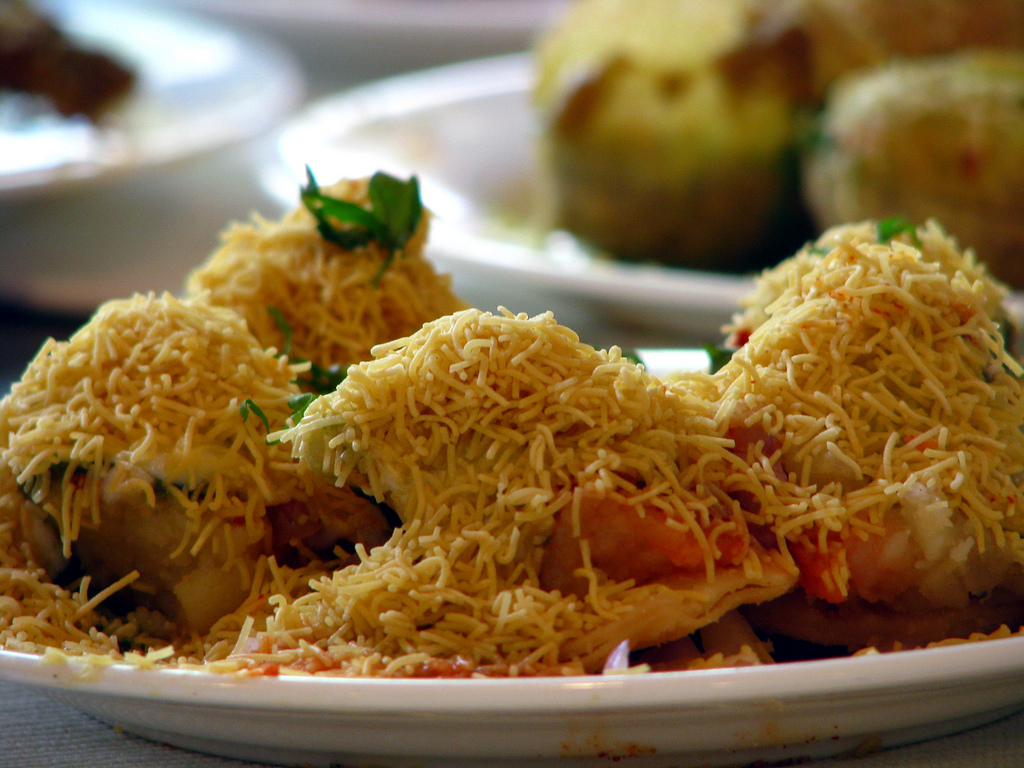
Sev puri made with flat papris

Sev puri is a chaat made from a small puri that is hollowed and filled, similar to panipuri. Flat papri may be used instead of round puri. It is loaded with a filling that may include diced or mashed potatoes, chickpeas, and tomatoes, although there is no fixed recipe. The dish is then garnished with the signature ingredient, sev, which is thin, crunchy noodles. Many types of sev puri add other ingredients in the fillings, such as paneer.

Sev puri is usually served without sauce. It uses similar ingredients to bhelpuri but does not contain puffed rice, instead being served on top of puris.

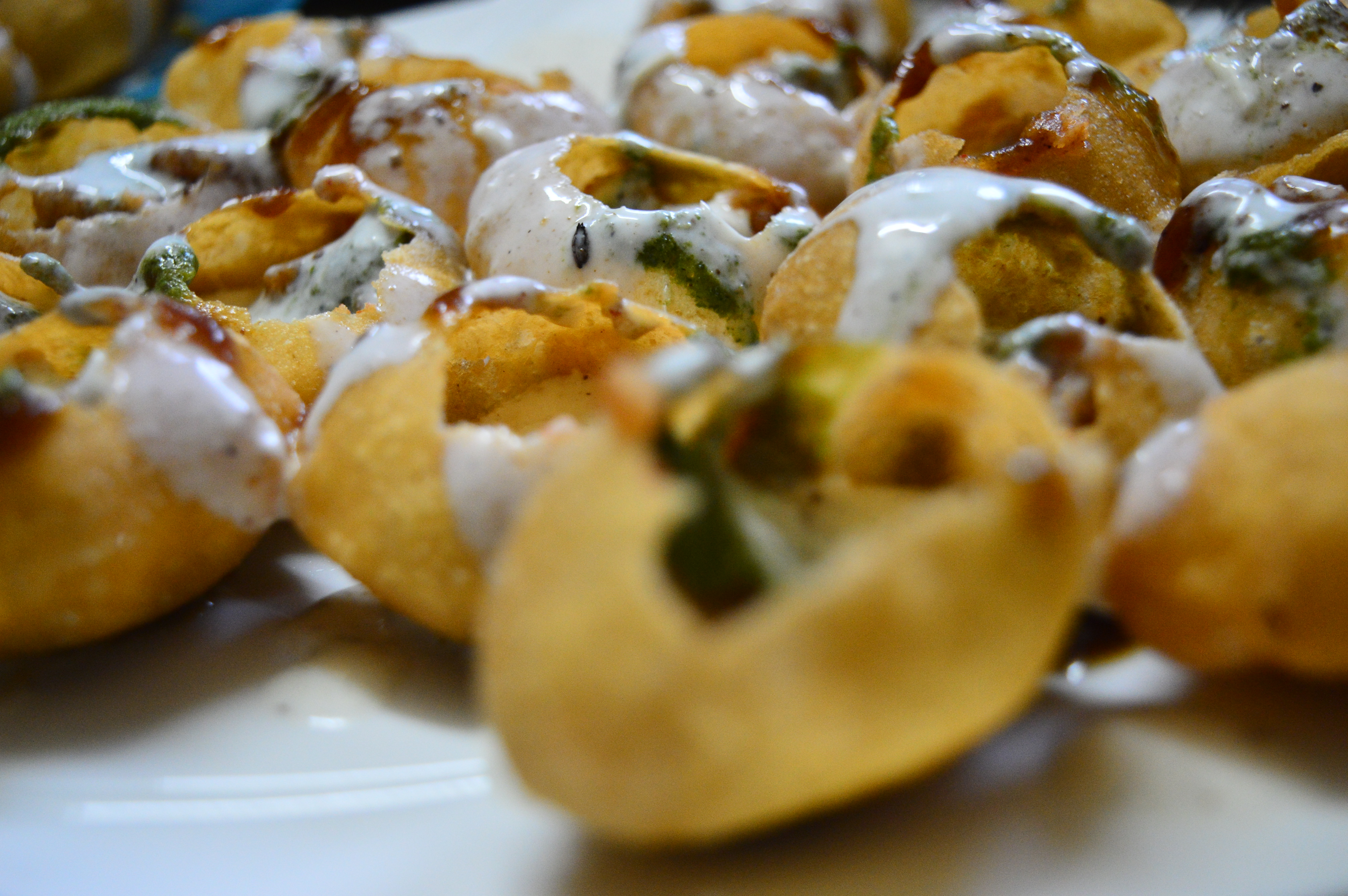
Dahi puri

Dahi puri (also called dahi sev puri or dahi batata puri) is a variant of sev puri whose filling is topped with dahi (yoghurt) and chaat masala. Dahi puri may be made with the mini puri shells which are also used for panipuri, or with small, flat puris. The filling of dahi puri is based on bhelpuri and is similar to that of panipuri. It is stuffed with potatoes or chickpeas and is garnished with sev, moong dal, and coriander leaves. Some popular chutneys used with dahi puri include coriander leaf, tamarind, and date. Sour dahi is used to complement sweet and spicy flavours of the chutneys.

== History and consumption ==
According to food writer Kunal Vijaykar, sev puri was invented in Mumbai by North Indian migrants, as a form of North Indian chaat, and its ingredients are rooted in the farsan snacks of Gujarati cuisine. It may have been invented by Gujarati migrants in the city. However, according to Vinay MR Mishra of the Hindustan Times, sev puri and dahi puri both originated in the city of Pune.

Sev puri and dahi puri are popular street foods across India; dahi puri is available in every major city. Supermarkets also stock ready-to-eat packets of sev puri and similar snacks like bhelpuri. Sev puri and dahi puri are popular in the street food of Mumbai, available across the city. Sev puri is famously sold by street vendors at the city's Juhu Beach.
