= Luchi =

Deep-fried flatbread made of wheat flour

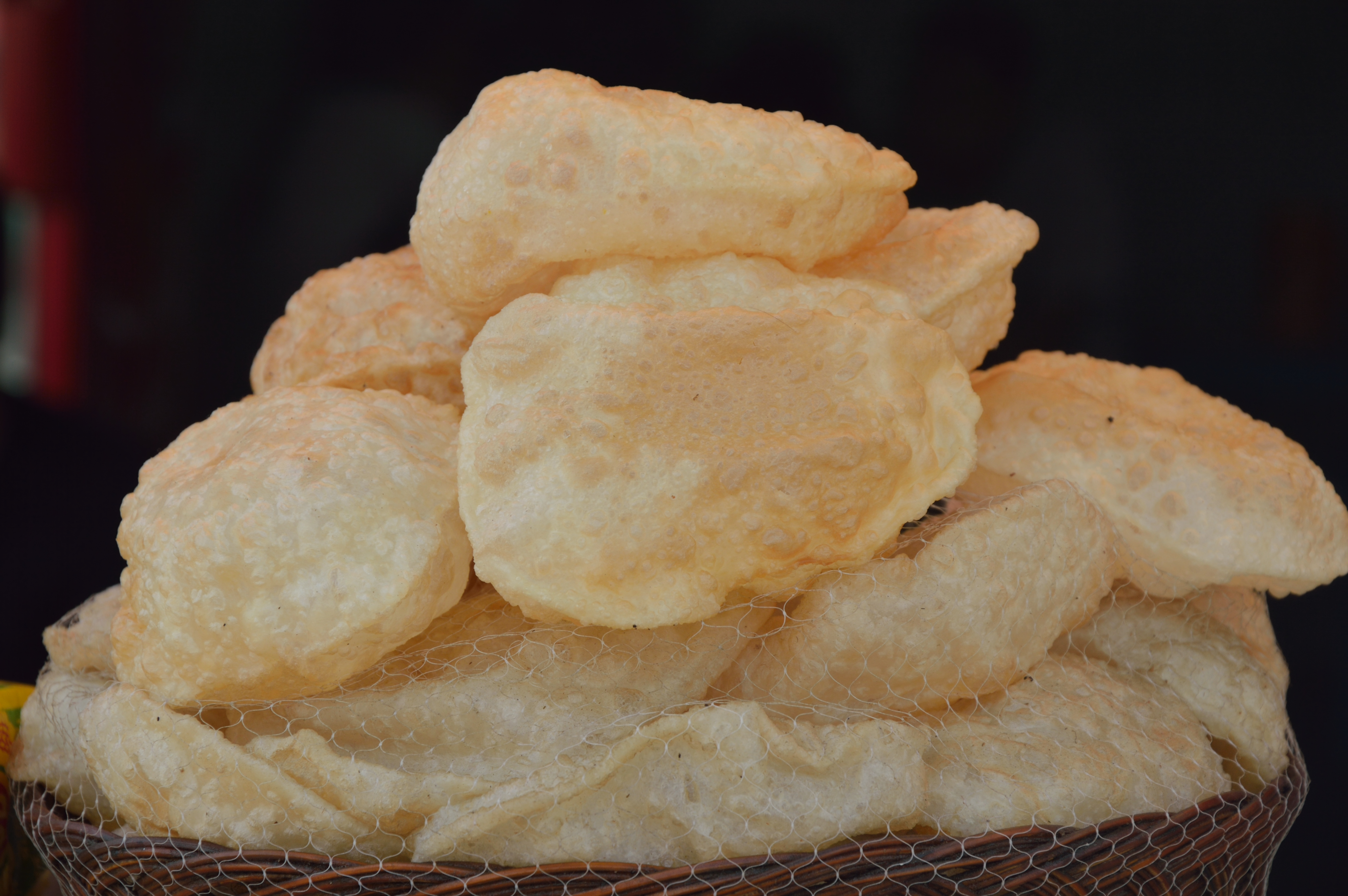
- Luchi
- Type: Flatbread
- Associated cuisine: Bengali cuisine
- Serving temperature: Hot
- Main ingredients: Maida flour, ghee, water
- Variations: Puri, Kachori

Luchi (IPA: [lutʃi]) is a flatbread that is deep-fried, popular in Bengali cuisine. It is made of maida flour, water, and ghee. It is similar to puri, which is made with atta rather than maida. Luchi is eaten with dishes such as aloo dum or dal. Originating from a dish called shaskuli, luchi was first attested in 1660. It is commonly eaten during festivals. Variations of luchi include kachori and khasta luchi, and local variations exist across Bengal.

== Preparation and serving ==
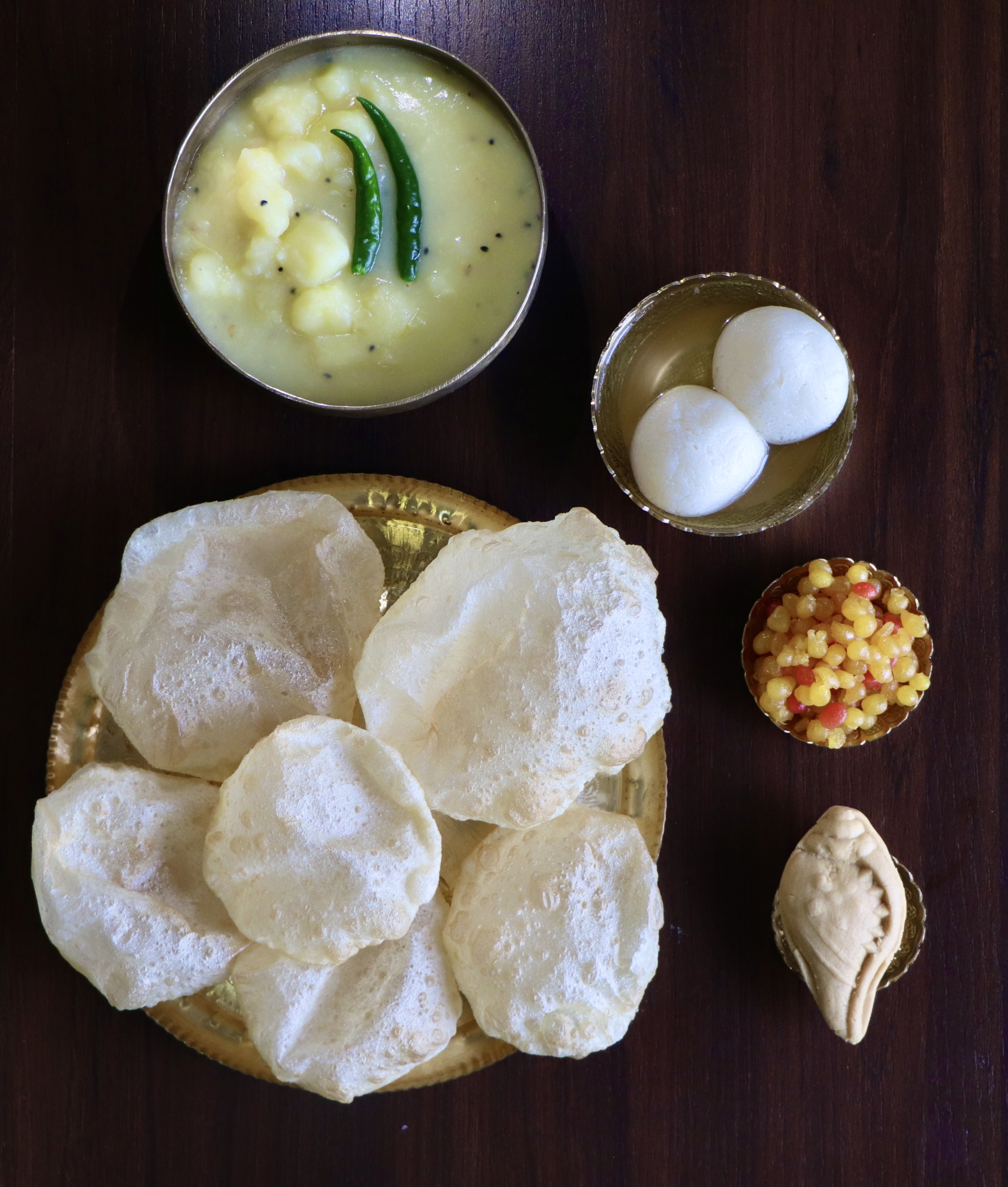
Luchi served with (clockwise from top) potato tarkari, rasgullas, boondi and sandesh

Luchi is a flatbread made of maida flour, water and ghee. It may additionally use semolina. The dough is kneaded, shaped into a circle, and deep-fried, typically in a karahi pot. Each luchi is fried individually, filling with air as the oil is spooned over it, after which it is flipped and cooked until golden brown. The diameter of luchi is typically 12.5–15 centimetres (5–6 inches), though it ranges from 7.5 cm (3 in) to 12.5 cm (5 in). It is served while hot and fresh.

Luchi is commonly served with payesh, begun bhaja, dal, aloo dum, or mutton. The luchi is torn and eaten with the side dishes. In upper-class Bengali Hindu culture, the traditional method is to tear it using the thumb and first two fingers. Luchi may be eaten for breakfast, lunch, afternoon tea, or dinner; it is traditionally part of a Bengali dinner.

Luchi and the similar puri of North Indian cuisine are distinguished by the flour, as puri is made with atta. Puri also uses less water, causing it to be firmer, and does not have fat in the dough, causing it to be thinner and more air-filled. Kachori is luchi with a stuffing such as peas. A traditional variant of luchi is radhabollobi, filled with dal; this typically uses urad dal, as opposed to dal puri, which uses chickpeas. Khasta luchi is made with extra ghee for a flaky, rather than puffy, texture. Less common variations of luchi include moricher luchi, made with black pepper, keema puri, made with ground meat, and colourful versions using beetroot or spinach.

== History and etymology ==
The word luchi or similar words do not appear in Sanskrit or Prakrit texts. According to one theory, luchi comes from the Hindi word locha (लोच), referring to something slippery, named for the way luchi slips from one's hands. According to another theory, it comes from the Sanskrit word lochak (लोचक), meaning pupil, due to its round shape. As per the Hindī Śabdasāgara, the word luchi is derived from the Sanskrit word ruchi (रुचि), meaning something which is appetizing.

The original form of luchi was called shaskuli. It was described by the eleventh-century Pala medical writer Chakrapani Datta in his book Dravyaguna, which wrote, "Kneading wheat flour with ghee, rolling it out, and frying it in hot ghee results in shaskuli, whose qualities are like phenika [khaja]." In the Pala era, three varieties of shaskuli were common: khasta, which was kneaded with fat, sapta, which was kneaded without fat, and puri. The khasta of the Pala era became the luchi popular in Bengal, while puri became popular in North India. Luchi was traditionally made without water, using ghee or bananas instead. The first mention of luchi in Bengali literature was in a 1660 Vaishnava text titled Rasikamangala. In the Mughal Empire, deep-fried foods such as luchi were common among the upper class.

In the 1854 play Kuleen Kulasarbbaswa by Ramnarayan Tarkaratna, luchi is described as the finest component of a light meal. In Bengal, wheat-based foods such as luchi were primarily for special occasions before wheat became a staple food, alongside rice, during the 1943 famine. Luchi became popular in Assam during the British Raj era, when Bengali people comprised much of the regional administration. In Bihar, luchi (or luchuī) was recorded by 19th-century British sources. During this time, luchi was commonly eaten for afternoon tea among aristocratic households. Luchi was incorporated into Anglo-Indian cuisine by the post-independence era; an Anglo-Indian diarist in the 1970s listed it as a typical component of a big breakfast.

== Consumption ==
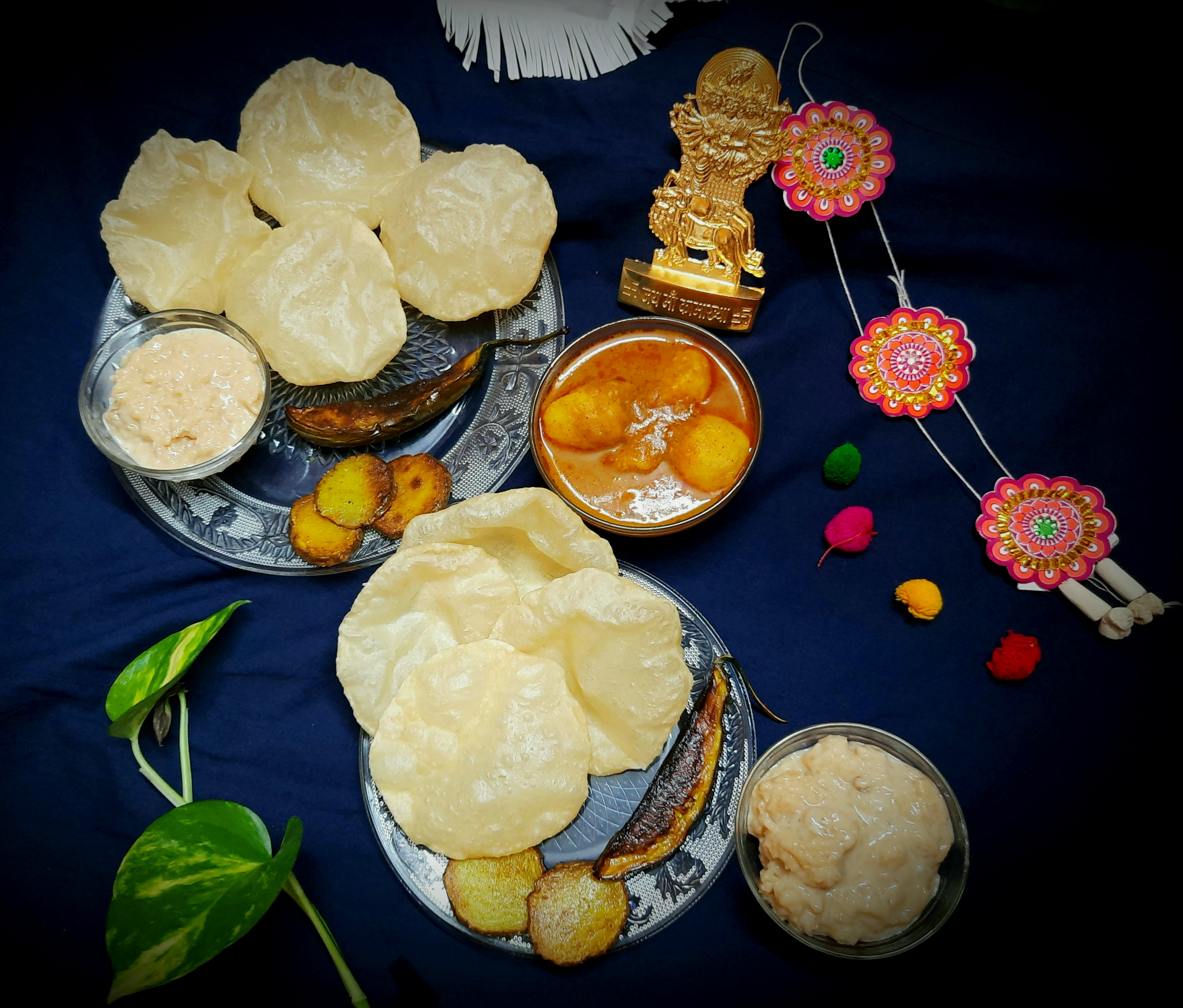
Luchi, aloo dum, and payesh

Luchi is popular in Bengali cuisine, even though rice is the main staple in the region. According to the Bengali Culinary Dictionary, by Milon Datta, luchi is Bengali people's favorite salty food. Luchi is eaten during the festivals of Durga Puja, Lakshmi Puja, and Kali Puja, served with dal and potato curry. A sweet version served during Durga Puja is poddo luchi (lit. 'lotus luchi', which is stuffed with dried fruit and khoa. Luchi became part of religious festivals as it was in the traditional category of cooked food, served to priests. According to chef Sharad Dewan, "Luchi is the perfect celebratory food. On normal days, people eat their staples, rice or rotis, or other cereals. But luchis are for special occasions".

The typical diameter of luchi is six to eight inches in rural Bengal and three to four inches in Kolkata. Luchi served in Malda District, West Bengal, is plate-shaped and over twelve inches wide. Kantajew Temple in Dinajpur District, Bangladesh, once served bowl-shaped luchi to be torn with both hands. Near the city of Malda, the cremation ground of Sadullapur serves "elephant's foot luchi", shaped like an elephant's foot, which is sold by weight to pilgrims bathing in the Bhagirathi River. According to researcher Pranab Ray, the smallest luchi in India is likely found in the village of Palashi, Midnapore district (near Radhamohanpur railway station), where it is offered as bhoga at the Nandi family estate, with a diameter of one to one-and-a-half inches.

== See also ==
- List of Indian breads
- Indian cuisine
- Bangladeshi cuisine
