= Paturi (Bengali dish) =

Bengali dish

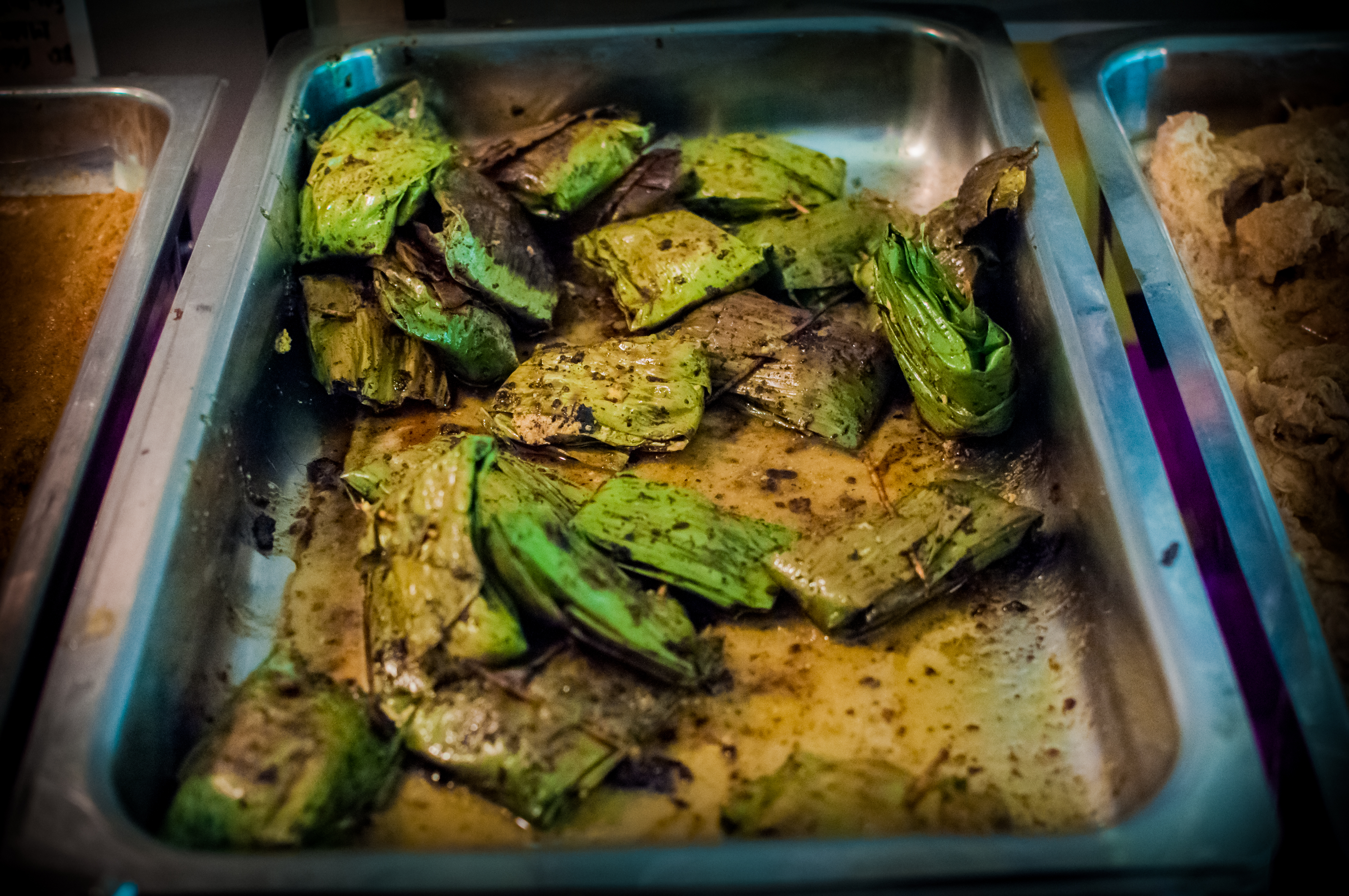
- Ilish (Hilsa) paturi wrapped in banana leaves
- Course: Main dish
- Place of origin: India
- Region or state: Bengal
- Associated cuisine: Indian (Bengali)
- Variations: Machher paturi

Paturi is a Bengali dish, which comes in both vegetarian and non-vegetarian varieties. The leaves of the plant play an important role in the preparation of this dish, as the ingredients are wrapped in the leaves and tied with twine and cooked on low flame or steamed.

Vegetarian options of paturi include paneer, dal, sandesh etc., while non-vegetarian options include machher (fish) paturi. Fresh water fish are mainly used to make machher paturi.

== Etymology ==
The word paturi is related to the leaves used in cooking, the ingredients of the dish are wrapped in the leaves and cooked. Banana leaves, bottle gourd leaves or pumpkin leaves are used in cooking this dish. That is, the foodstuff which is prepared wrapped in leaves can be identified as Paturi.

== History ==
Paturi is not much mentioned in the diet of Bengalis in ancient and medieval times as compared to the present time. However, a mention of Paturi's preparation can be found in the Banshulimangal, a bengali kavya (poem), written by poet Mukund Mishra. Paturi is one of the dishes that Rukmini prepared for Swami Dhusdatta, mentioned in this Kavya. In the Kavya, there is a mention of macher (fish) paturi with mustard.

== Different types of paturi ==
Paturi can be prepared with a wide variety of ingredients, both vegetarian and non-vegetarian. However, among non-vegetarian dishes of paturi, fish dishes are more prevalent. Different types of paturi are prepared from different fish like Bhetki paturi, Ilish paturi, Koi paturi, Rui paturi etc. Apart from fish, there are egg dishes too, and even fish egg dishes are made. Paturi is also prepared with prawns, known as chingri paturi.

Paturi has many vegetarian options. Vegetarian Dal paturis are prepared using pulses (edible legume), among which Mushur dal paturi is notable. Paturi is also prepared from dairy products, such as paneer—a fresh acid-set cheese common in cuisine of India—and chhana, a kind of acid-set cheese. Paturi prepared using these dairy products are known as Paneer Paturi and Chhanar Paturi respectively. Paturi is also prepared with sandesh, a famous Bengali dessert made from milk.

Variations of Paturi
Dish	Photos	Plant leaves (as a wrapper)	Ingredients		
Dish	Photos	Plant leaves (as a wrapper)	Main	Essential	Other
Neeramish (vegetarian) paturi
Dal Paturi		Gourd leaves	Dal (pulses)	Green chillies, turmeric powder (haldi) and mustard oil	Onions, garlics, black cumins, coriander powder, tomato, ginger
Paneer Paturi		Banana leaves	Paneer	Black mustard seeds, turmeric powder (haldi), mustard oil, green chillies	Poppy seeds, coconut
Sandesh Paturi		Banana leaves	Sandesh		
Chhanar paturi		Banana leaves	Chhana	Mustard seeds, flour and green chillies	Poppy seeds, sugar
Amish (non-vegetarian) paturi
Bhetki paturi		Banana leaves	Bhetki (Barramundi)	Mustard seeds, mustard oil, turmeric powder (haldi) and green chillies	Coconut, Tok Doi (yogurt)
Ilish paturi		Banana leaves	Ilish	Mustard seeds, mustard oil, turmeric powder (haldi) and green chillies	Poppy seeds, coconut, Tok Doi (yogurt)
Koi paturi		Gourd leaves	Koi (Anabas)	Mustard seeds, mustard oil, turmeric powder (haldi) and green chillies, onions	Garlic, cumin powder, coconut, coriander powder
Rui paturi		Banana leaves	Rui	Mustard seeds, mustard oil, turmeric powder (haldi) and green chillies	
Chingri paturi		Gourd leaves/Banana leaves	Chingri (Prawn)	Mustard seeds, mustard oil, turmeric powder (haldi), green chillies	poppy seeds, coconut, Tok Doi (yogurt), sugar, garlic
Dim paturi		Banana leaves	Egg or fish egg	Mustard seeds, mustard oil, turmeric powder (haldi) and green chillies	Poppy seeds, coconut

== Preparation and serving ==
The basic method of making paturi is to wrap the main ingredient in leaves along with spices and cook it on low flame or steam. Some cooking styles may be associated with this basic method of preparing each individual paturi. In some cases, at the time of cooking rice, fish with spices is wrapped in leaves and steamed by the steam generated in handi. Paturi is served with hot rice.

== Gallery ==
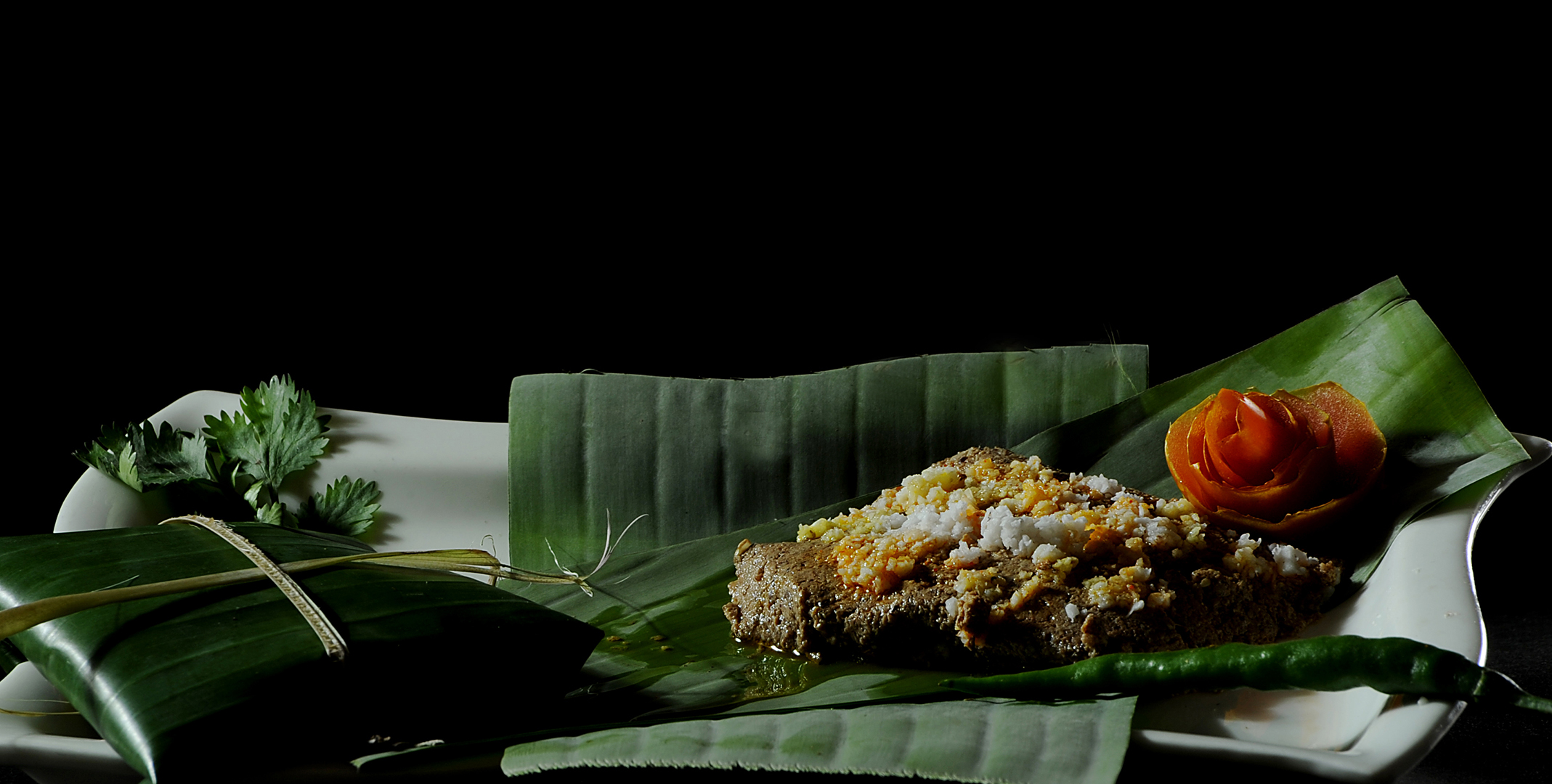
Machher (Fish) paturi at Tero Parban (a restaurant) in Kolkata

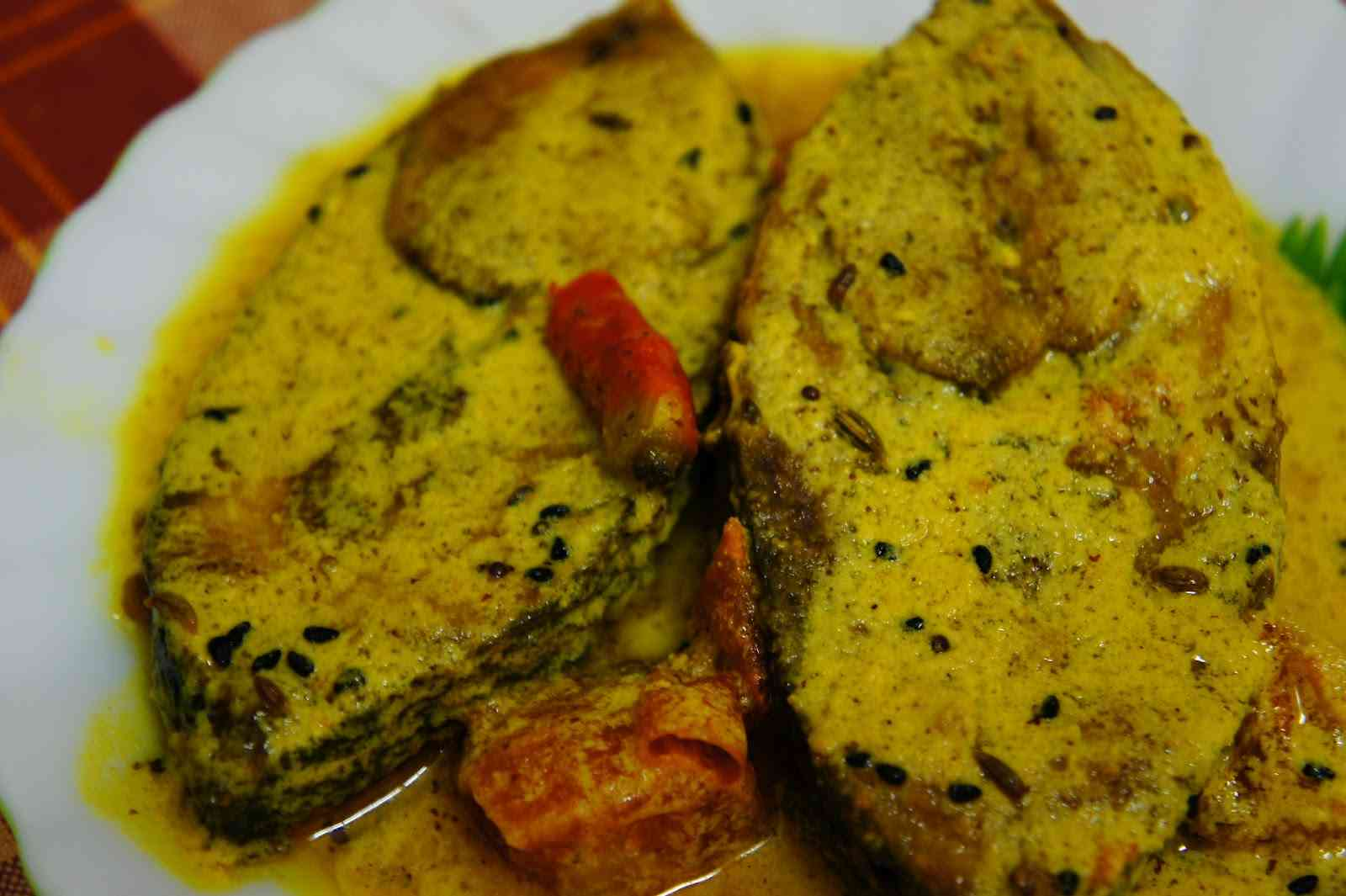
Ilish macher paturi

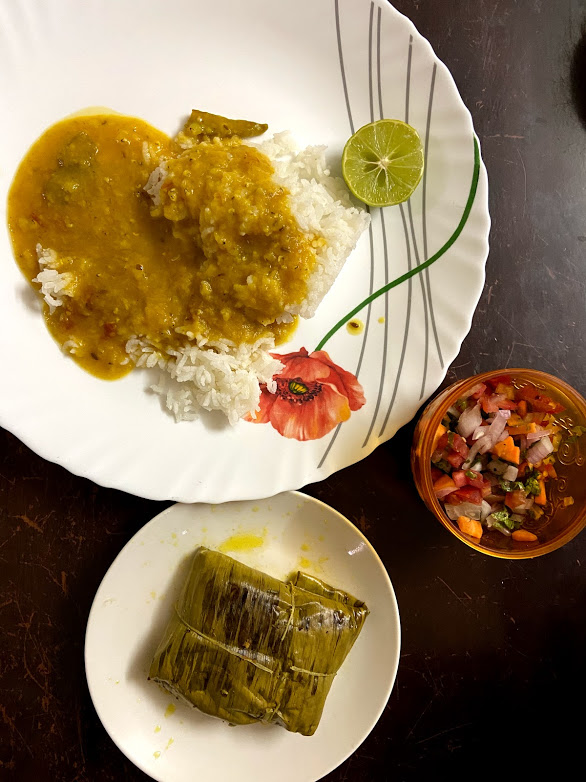
Homemade dal and rice meal with Bhetki paturi and salad

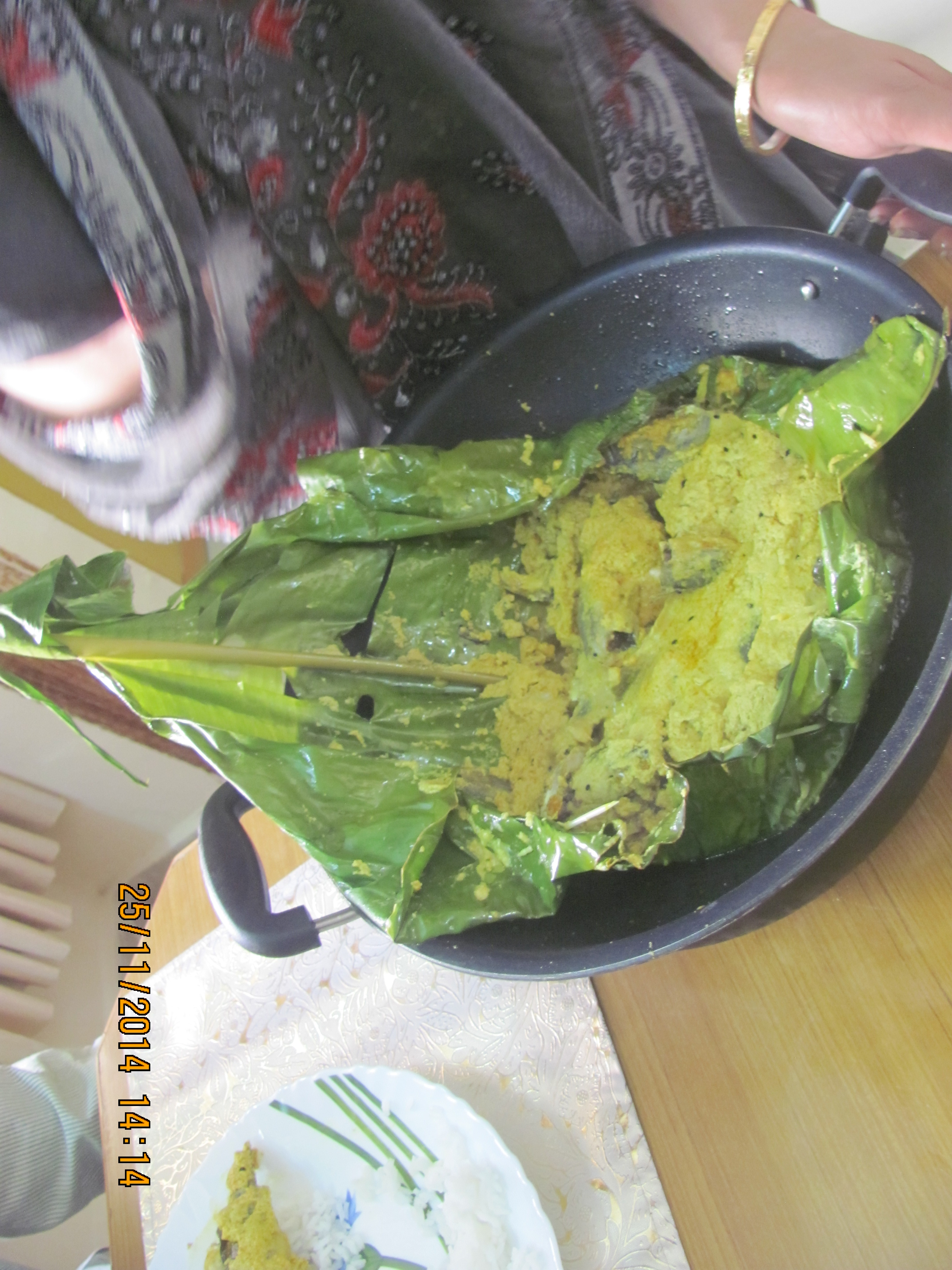
Bhetki paturi in banana leaf

== Bibliography ==
- Bhartiya, Shivam; Bhatt, Vaibhav; Ruiz, Andrea Edurne Jimenez, eds. (15 April 2024). Gastronomic Sustainability Solutions for Community and Tourism Resilience. IGI Global. ISBN 979-8-3693-4136-0.
