= Dum aloo =

Kashmiri fried potato curry

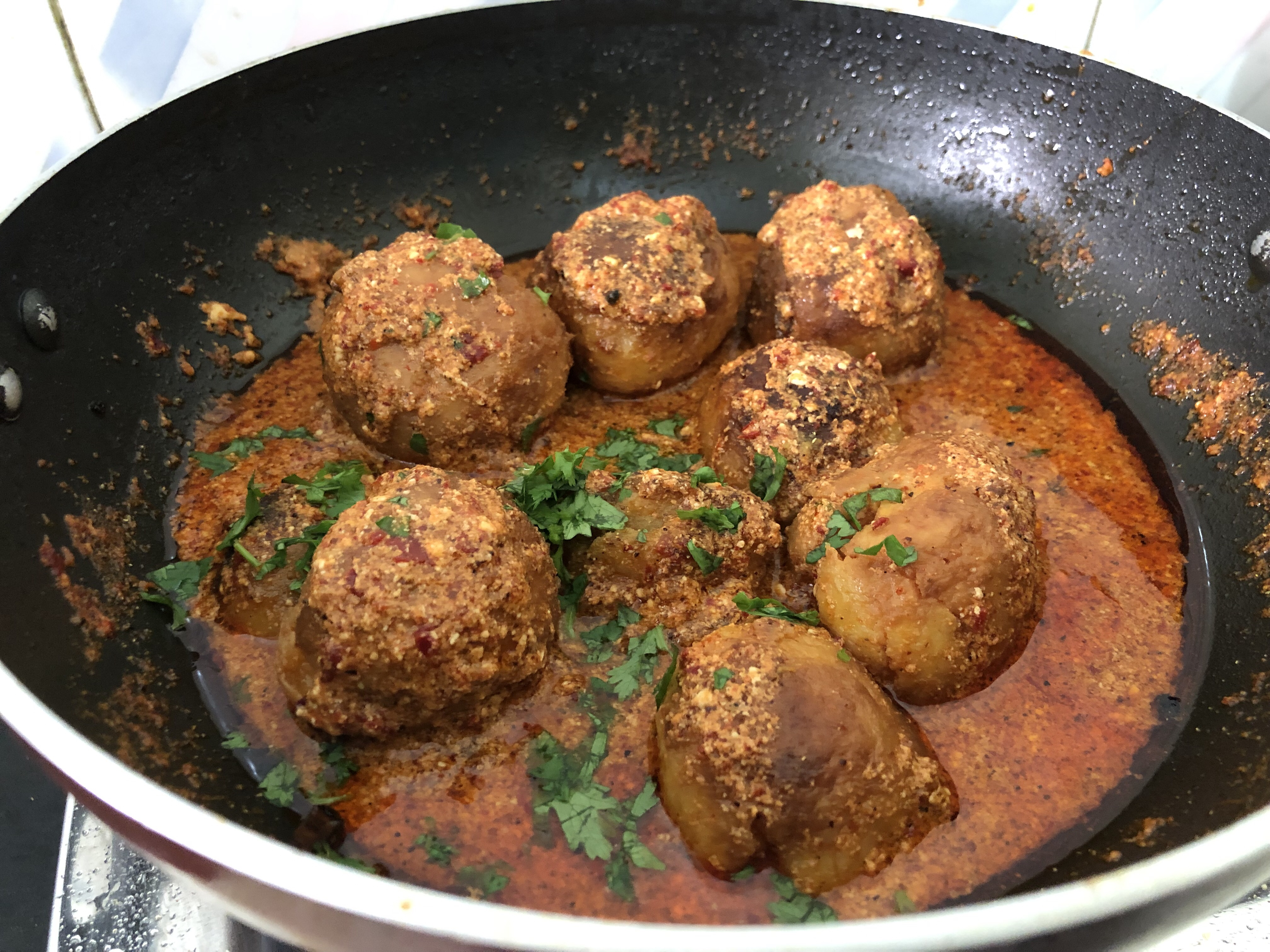
- Dum aloo
- Alternative names: Aloor dum
- Course: Main
- Place of origin: Kashmir
- Region or state: Jammu and Kashmir, Bhojpuri Region of Uttar Pradesh and Bihar, West Bengal of India
- Associated cuisine: India, Pakistan, Bangladesh
- Main ingredients: Potato, Indian spices, ginger, garlic, onion, herbs

Dum aloo (also spelled as dam aloo Hindi: दम आलू, romanised: dam ālū), dum olav (Kashmiri: دَمہٕ اولَو, romanised: damü ōlav), aaloo dam (Bhojpuri: 𑂄𑂪𑂳 𑂠𑂧, romanised: ālō dam) aloor dom (Bengali: আলুর দম, romanised: ālūr dam) or aloo dum (Odia: ଆଳୁ ଦମ, romanised: ālū dam) is a potato-based curry dish.

== Etymology ==
The word dum translates to steam-cooked or slow-cooked, while aloo means potato, so dum aloo essentially means "steam-cooked potatoes". Note that "steam-cooked" refers to a technique where the potatoes are cooked while sitting in a steaming sauce; They are not "steamed" above boiling water, for example.

== Cuisine ==
Dum aloo is a part of the traditional Kashmiri Pandit cuisine, from the Kashmir Valley, in the Indian state of Jammu and Kashmir.

Dum aloo is cooked widely in India and Pakistan.

Dum aloo also has Banarasi and Bengali variations.

== Preparation ==
The potatoes, usually smaller ones, are first skinned and deep fried.

Kashmiri dum aloo sauce is made with yogurt or khoya, and often includes a cashew nut paste. The Banarasi variation's sauce is typically more aromatic and is made from tomatoes and onions.

Spices such as red chilies, garlic, ginger, cardamom, and fennel, along with other herbs, are added to the sauce.

The potatoes are cooked slowly at low heat in the sauce, and can be garnished with coriander.

Dum aloo is often paired and served with naan.

== See also ==
- List of potato dishes
