= Papri chat =

Street food in Indian sub-continent

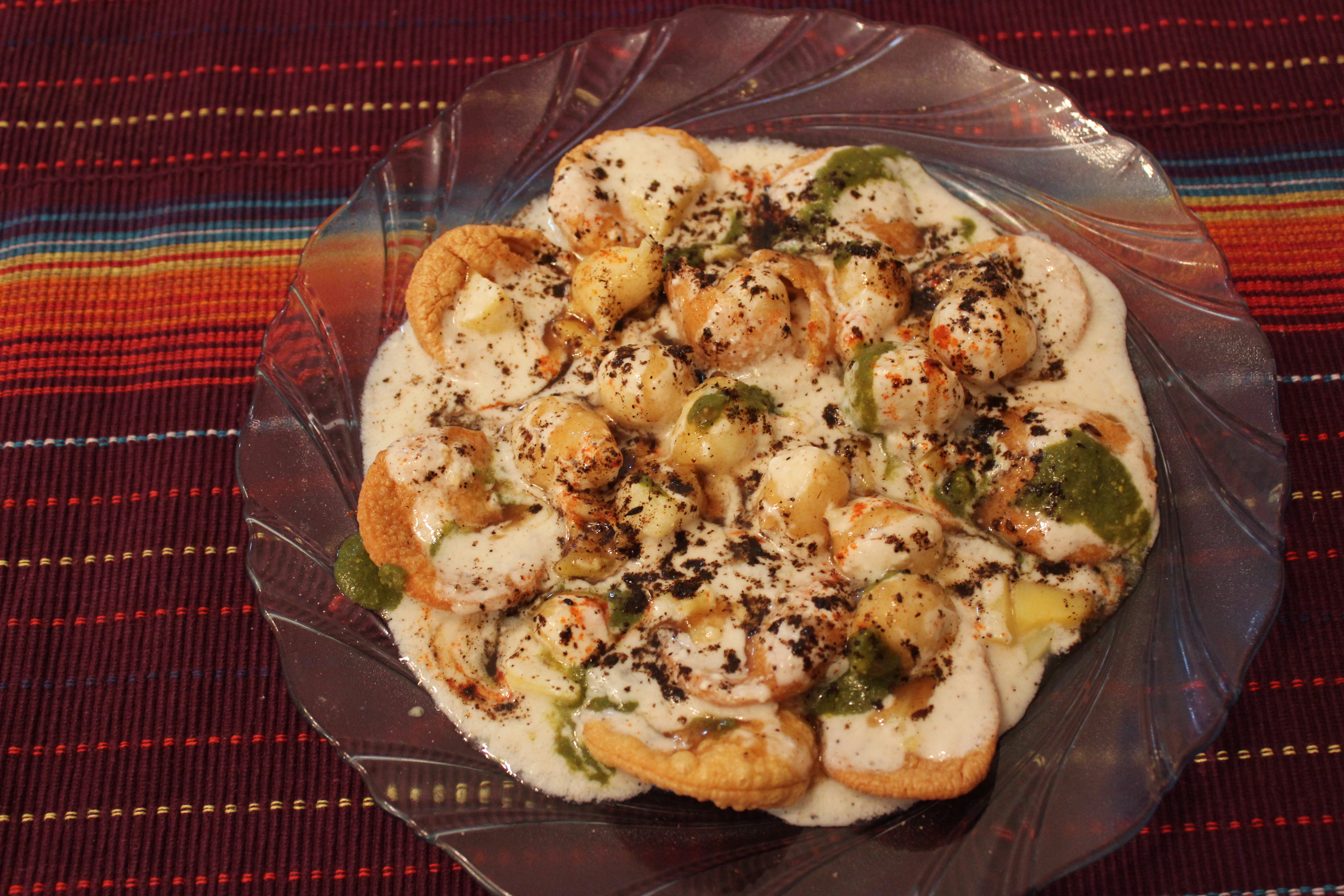
- Papri chaat
- Type: snack
- Course: hors d'oeuvre
- Place of origin: India
- Region or state: Indian subcontinent

Papri chat, papadi chaat, or papri chaat (ISO: pāpṛī cāṭ) is a popular traditional fast food and street food from the Indian subcontinent, including India, Bangladesh, Nepal and parts of Pakistan. Many various additional dishes throughout India are also referred to as papri chat. Some restaurants in the United States serve the traditional version of the dish.

== Preparation ==
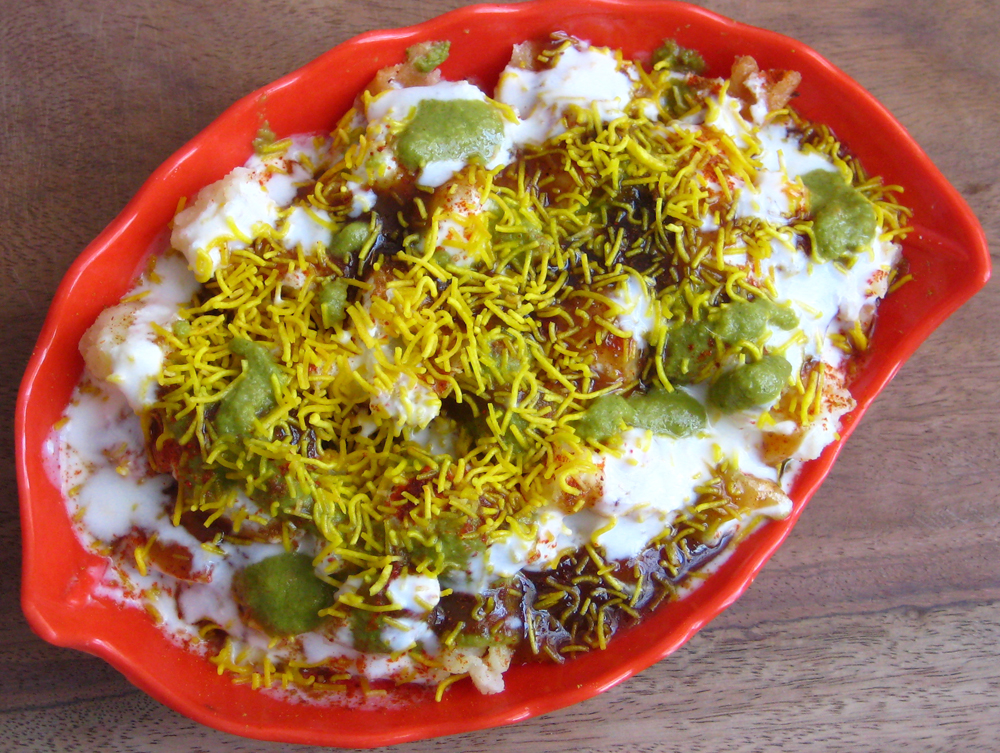
Papri chaat served with boiled potato, coriander chutney, tamarind chutney, yogurt and topped with sev

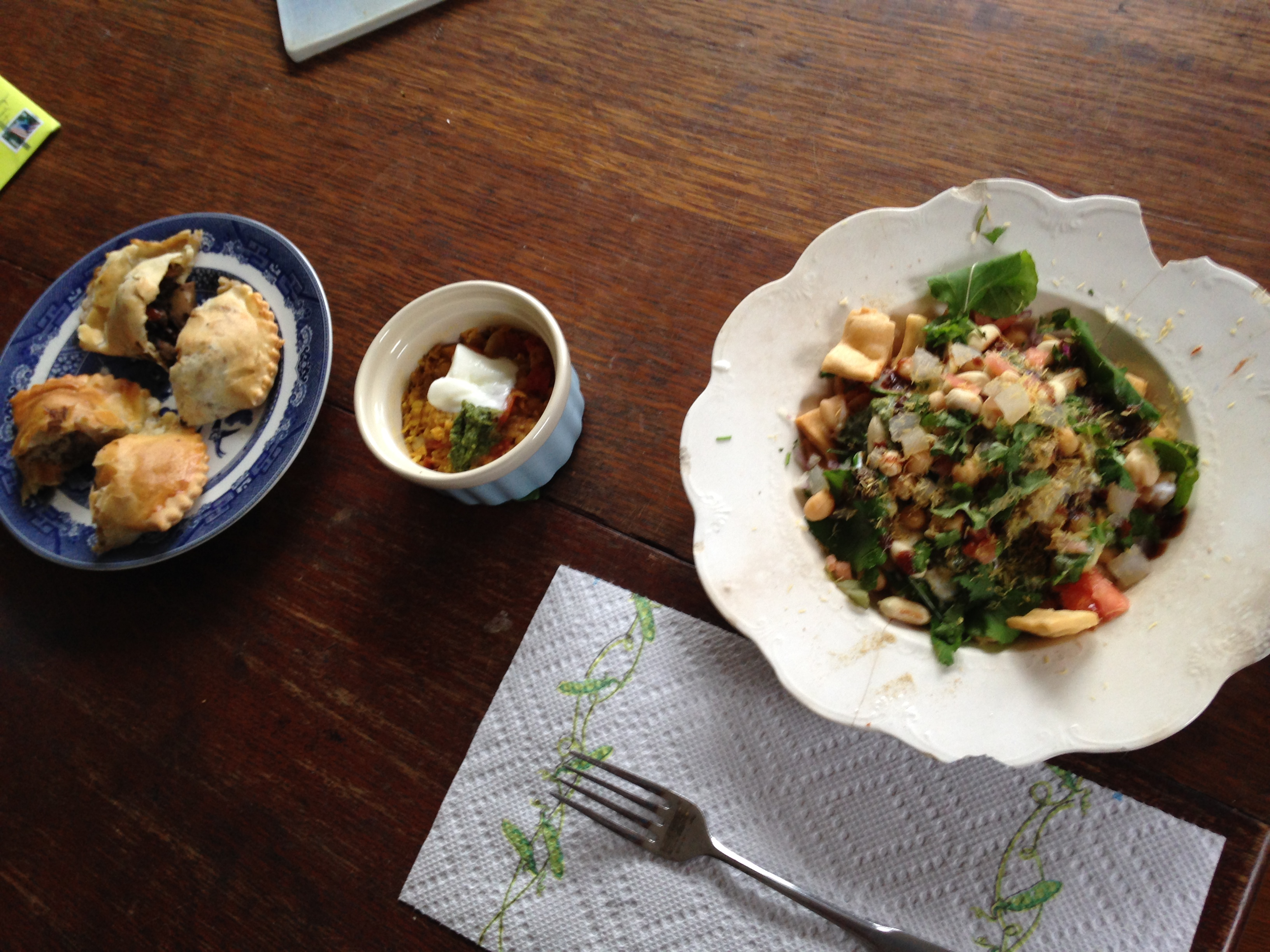
Papri chaat (right) with dal and empanadas

Papri chaat is traditionally prepared using crisp fried dough wafers known as papri, along with boiled chickpeas, boiled potatoes, dahi (yogurt) and tamarind chutney and topped with chat masala and sev. The papri are typically prepared with refined wheat flour (maida) and ghee or oil. Mint, cilantro and spices may also be used. The dish has sweet, sour, tangy and spicy flavors and a creamy and crunchy texture.

== Etymology ==
Papri refers to the wafers, and the word chaat is derived from the Sanskrit verb caṭ which means tasting with a fingertip and represents the sound made; thereby, it refers to several fast food dishes and snacks. Chaat is a thick cream in Hindi. The term also refers to a variety of dishes in India.

A recipe for papri (as purika) is mentioned in Manasollasa, a 12th-century Sanskrit encyclopedia compiled by Someshvara III, who ruled from present-day Karnataka.

== Street food ==
Papri chaat is often sold and consumed at mobile food stalls in India. In India, it is more popular in the northern region of the country compared to other areas.
