= Bombay mix =

Savory Indian snack food

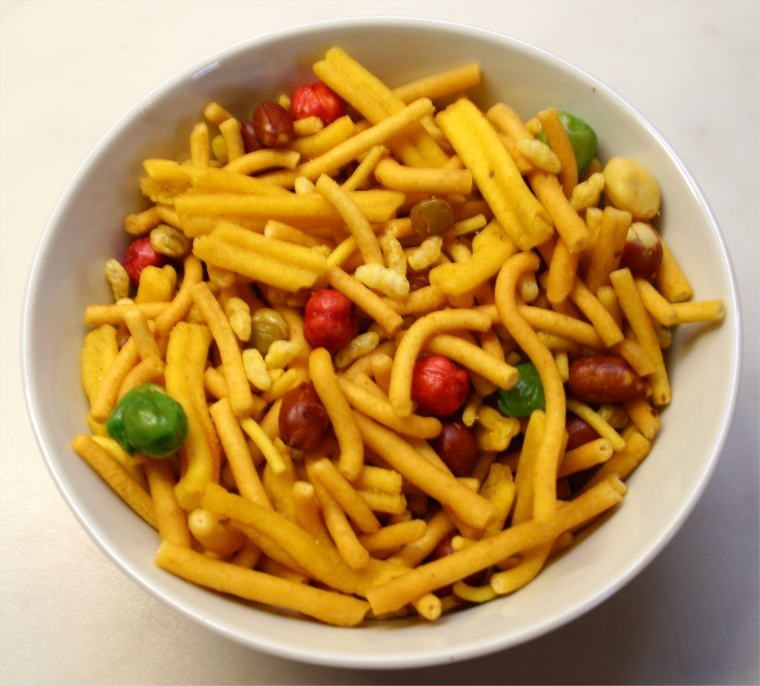
- A bowl of bombay mix
- Alternative names: Dalmut, Chanachur, Bhuja
- Type: Snack
- Place of origin: India
- Region or state: Bombay
- Associated cuisine: Indian

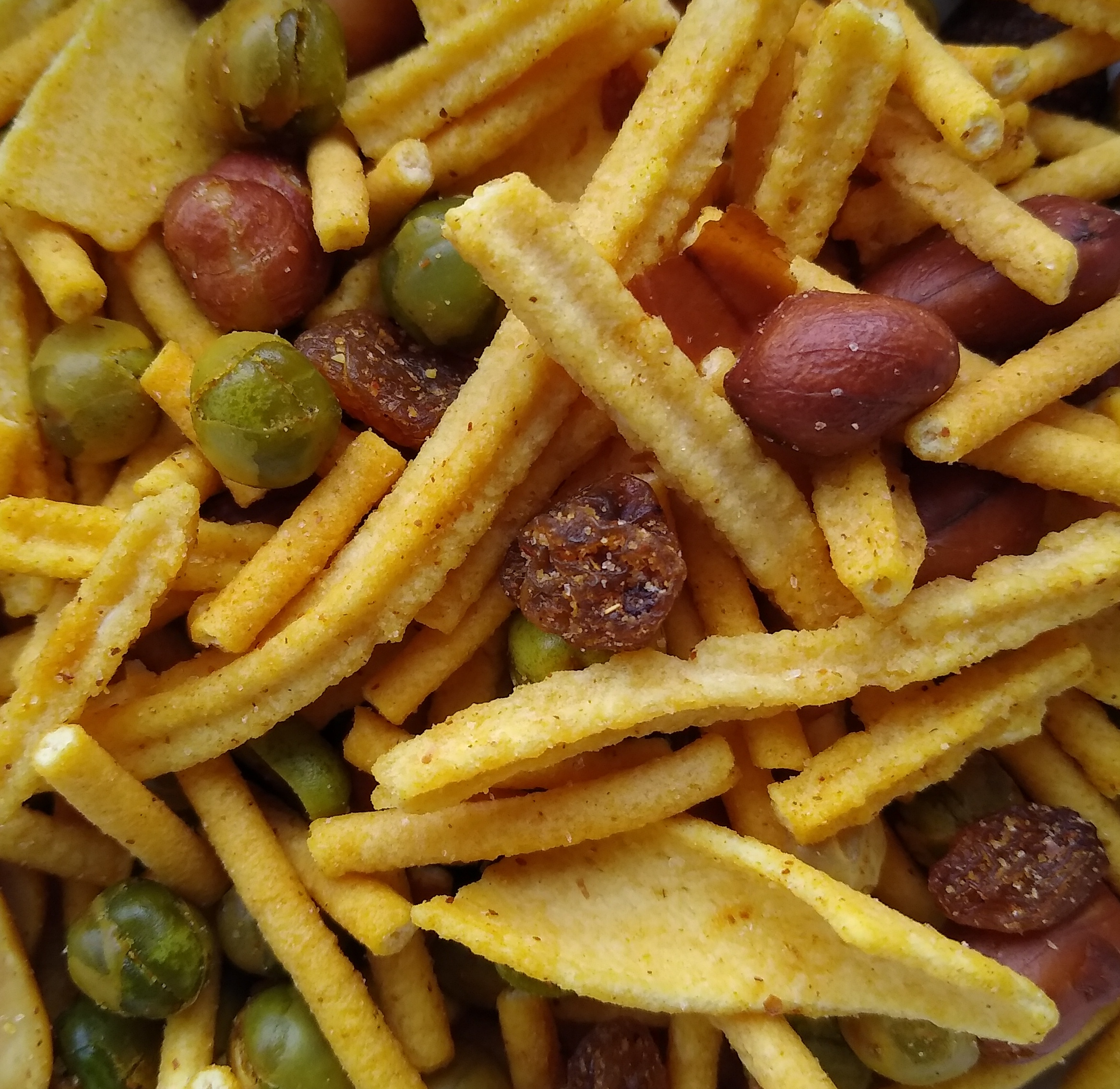
Bhuja sold in Australia

Bombay mix is an Indian snack mix of spicy dried ingredients, such as sev, fried lentils, peanuts, chickpeas, chickpea flour ganthiya, corn, vegetable oil, puffed rice, fried onion and curry leaves. This is seasoned with salt and spices that may include coriander and mustard seeds. Whilst ingredients vary per region and household, each variety seeks a combination of crunchy ingredients. It is part of a category of snack food called Farsan.

== Variations ==
Alternative, regional versions include:

- In Malaysia and Singapore, it is known as kacang putih (lit. 'white nut'), from the Malay for "chickpea". Members of the local Indian community usually refer to it as "mixture" as is done in southern India. It is available from roadside vendors as well as shops and restaurants. Singaporean supermarket FairPrice refer to their Bombay mix as murukku, which is an entirely different product.
- In western parts of India especially in Pune, Maharashtra it is known as Chiwda. Babus Laxminarayan Chiwda popularised the concept nationally and internationally with different varieties such as poha chiwda, potato chiwda, patal pohe chiwda, cornflakes chiwda and lite chiwda
- In southern Indian states such as Tamil Nadu and Kerala, as well as in the north of Sri Lanka, it is known as just "mixture", and is available in almost all the sweet shops and bakeries. Usually, it consists of fried peanuts, thenkuzhal, kara boondhi, roasted chana dal, karasev, murukku broken into small pieces, pakoda and oma podi.
- In the Indian states of West Bengal and Tripura, and in neighbouring Bangladesh, it is called Chanachur.
- In Pakistan, it is called Nimco or Nimko.

=== Naming conventions ===
The wide range of names used for Bombay mix reflects patterns of migration, local language use, and retail branding rather than strict differences in ingredients or preparation. In many regions outside India, similar savoury snack mixes are marketed under names that are more familiar to local consumers or aligned with established regional snack categories.

As a result, closely related mixes may be identified by different names in different countries, even when the underlying composition remains broadly comparable. This has contributed to the snack being perceived as distinct regional products despite sharing a common culinary origin.

== See also ==
- Sev
- Bhelpuri
- Sev mamra
- List of snack foods
  - List of Indian snack foods
- Makka poha
- Bikaneri bhujia
