= South Indian snacks =

This is a list of snacks common in South India.

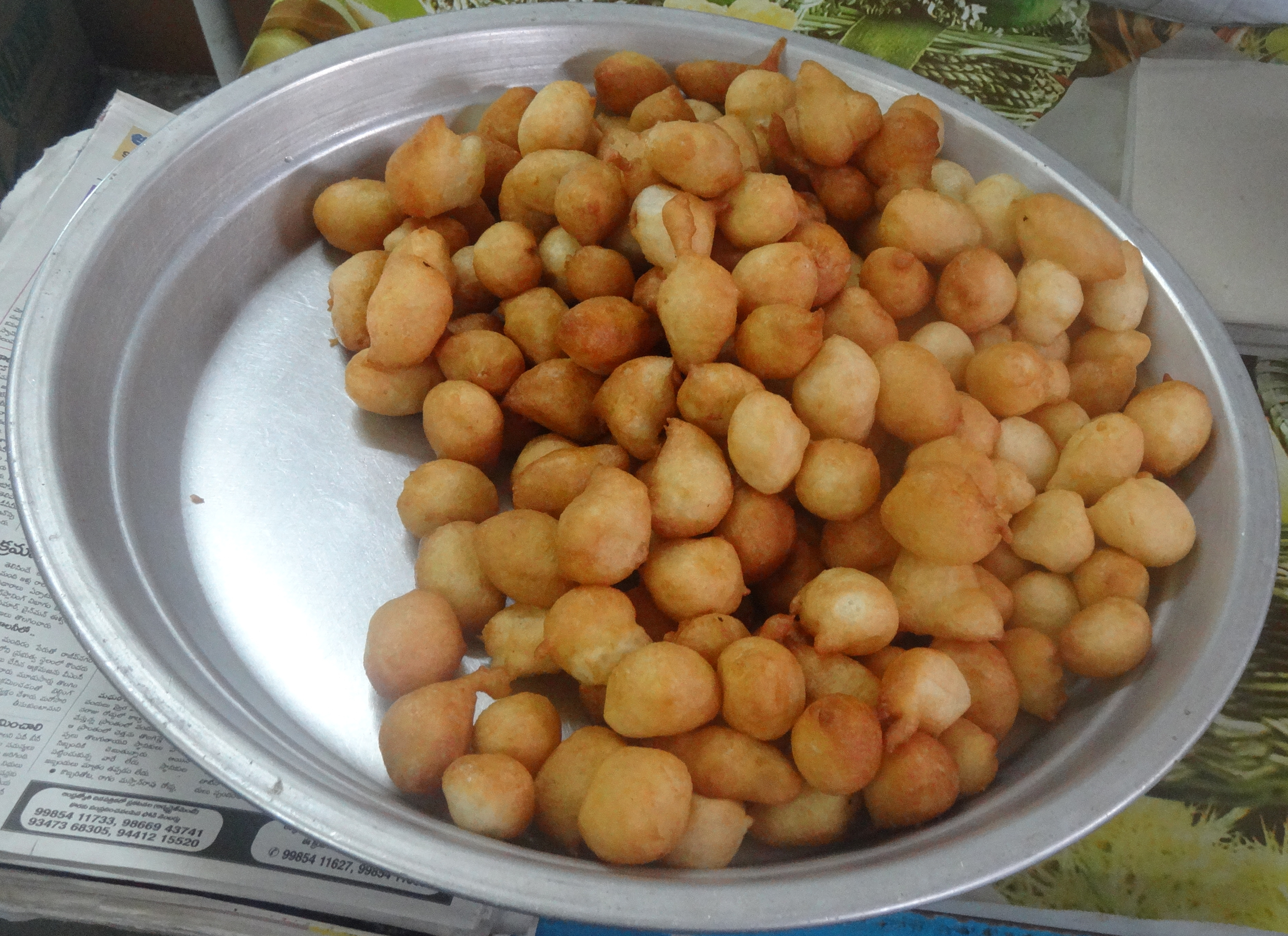
Punugulu

- Achappam
- Avalose unda
- Bajji
- Bonda
- Dahi Vada
- Dosa
- Jhangri
- Kozhalappam
- Murukku
- Pakkavada
- Pesarattu
- Poori
- Punugulu
- Pazhampori
- Vada
  - Uzhunnuvada
  - Parippuvada
  - Ullivada
- Upma
- Uttapam
- Vattayappam

== See also ==
- List of snack foods from the Indian subcontinent
