= Saggubiyyam punugulu =

Indian snack food

Saggubiyyam (sabudana) punugulu is a snack food typically made in Andhra Pradesh, India. They are sometimes called challa punugulu owing to the use of buttermilk or curd in the recipe, preferably sour.

It is a deep-fried sago/tapioca-pearl snack (fritters). It is crispy outside and soft inside and is also known as sabudana punugulu.

== Recipe ==
Sabugana or saggubiyyam is soaked in curd or buttermilk for 6–7 hours. To it, maida or all purpose flour is added to make a creamy batter. Salt can be added to taste. Other ingredients that can be added to enhance the flavour are tiny chopped pieces of green chilly, onion, ginger and a pinch of jeera. This mixture can be kept aside for around 30 minutes to rise or a pinch of baking soda can be used for instant rising.

Then cooking oil (whatever is used in the kitchen for regular cooking like sunflower oil, vegetable oil or groundnut oil) is poured in a pan and heated up. Once the oil is hot, small dumplings of the batter is put in the oil and deep fried.

== See also ==
- List of snack foods from the Indian subcontinent
