= Sabudana papar =

Variety of papar

Sabudana Papar
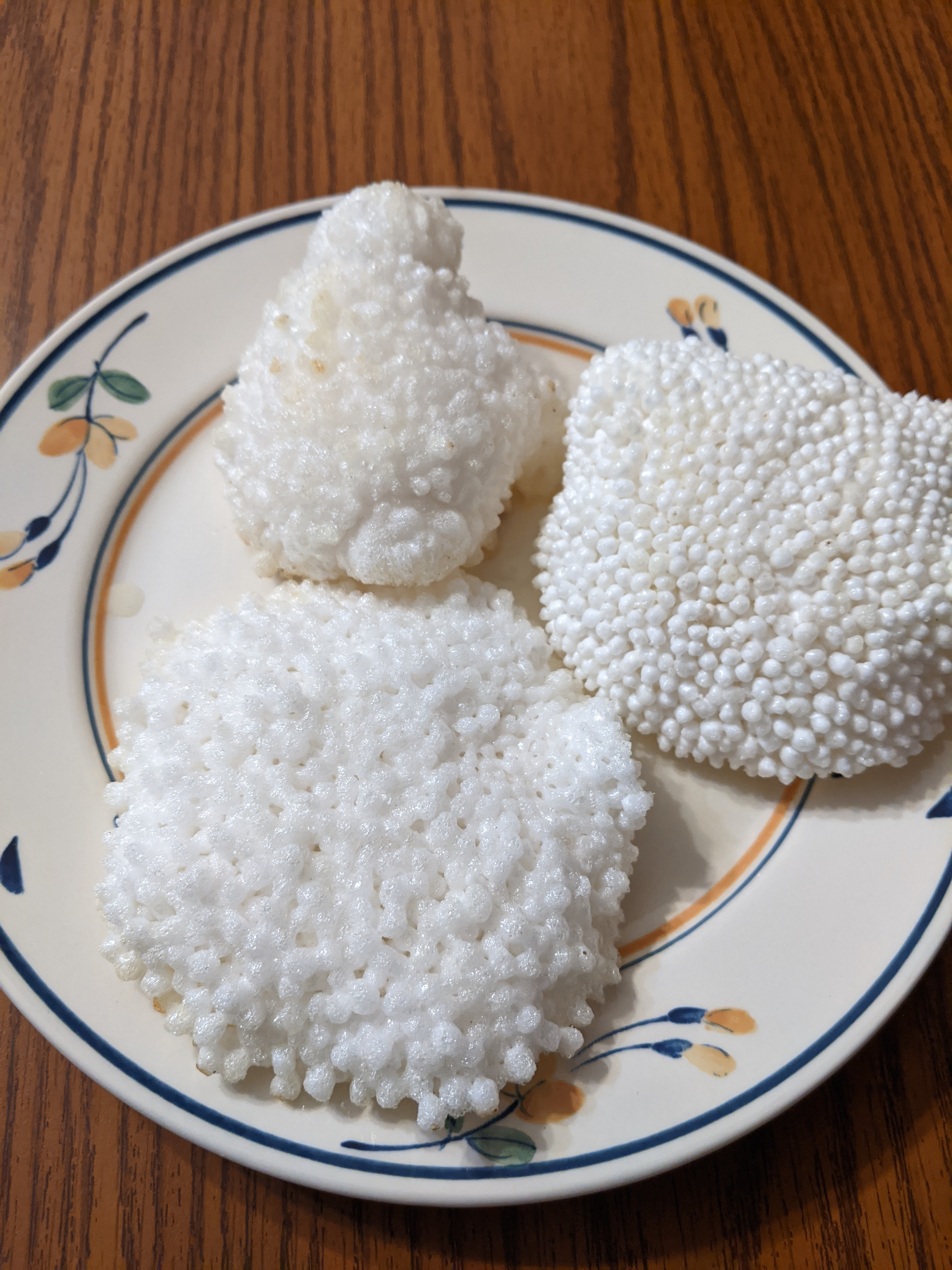
- Sabudana Papar on a plate
- Alternative names: Sabudana papad
- Course: Appetiser or side dish
- Place of origin: Indian subcontinent
- Associated cuisine: Indian, Pakistani
- Main ingredients: Sabudana

Sabudana papar (Hindi: साबूदाना पापड़, Urdu: سابودانہ پاپڑ; also spelled sabudana papad) is a crisp flatbread from the Indian subcontinent, being a type of papar. It is commonly served as a street food in India as well as during festivals.

== See also ==
- List of snack foods from the Indian subcontinent
