= Krishna Janmashtami =

Hindu festival celebrating Krishna's birth anniversary

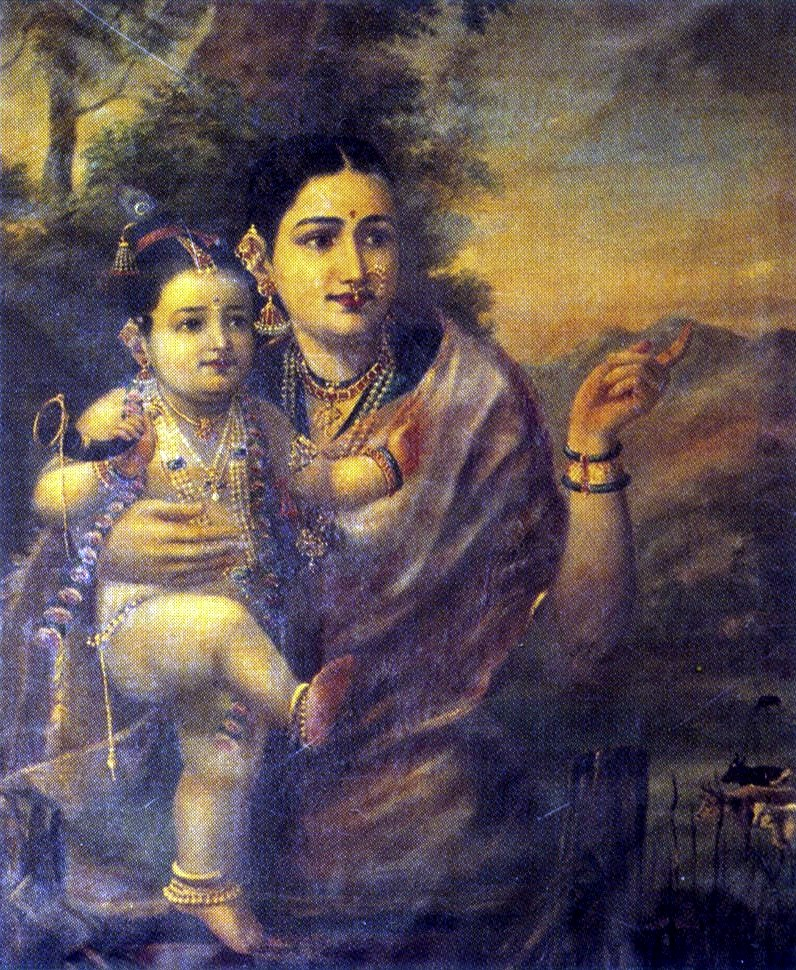
- Krishna with his foster-mother Yashoda
- Also called: Krishnashtami; Krishna Jayanti; Gokulashtami; Yadukulashtami; Srikrishna Jayanti; Ashtami Rohini
- Observed by: Hindus
- Type: Religious (1–2 days), cultural
- Significance: Commemorates the birth of Krishna
- Celebrations: Dahi Handi/Nandotsava (next day in the north), kite-flying, drawing footprints of infant Krishna, fasting, traditional sweet dishes, etc.
- Observances: Dance-drama, puja, night vigil, fasting
- Date: Shraavana Krishna Ashtami, Bhadra Krishna Ashtami
- 2026 date: 04 September

Explanatory note on Hindu festival dates
- The Hindu calendar is lunisolar but most festival dates are specified using the lunar portion of the calendar. A lunar day is uniquely identified by three calendar elements: māsa (lunar month), pakṣa (lunar fortnight) and tithi (lunar day). Furthermore, when specifying the masa, one of two traditions are applicable, viz. amānta / pūrṇimānta. If a festival falls in the waning phase of the moon, these two traditions identify the same lunar day as falling in two different (but successive) masa. A lunar year is shorter than a solar year by about eleven days. As a result, most Hindu festivals occur on different days in successive years on the Gregorian calendar.

Krishna Janmashtami (Sanskrit: कृष्णजन्माष्टमी, romanized: Kṛṣṇajanmāṣṭamī), also known as Krishnashtami, Janmashtami, or Gokulashtami, is an annual Hindu festival that celebrates the birth of Krishna, the eighth avatar of Vishnu. In prominent Hindu scriptures, such as the Mahabharata, Bhagavata Purana and Gita Govinda, Krishna has been identified as the supreme God and the source of all avatars. Krishna's birth is celebrated on the eighth day (Ashtami) of the dark fortnight (Krishna Paksha) in Shravana Masa (according to the amanta tradition) or Bhadrapada Masa (according to the purnimanta tradition).

This period corresponds to August or September in the Gregorian calendar.

It is an important festival, particularly in the Vaishnavism tradition of Hinduism. The celebratory customs associated with Janmashtami include a celebration festival, reading and recitation of religious texts, dance and enactments of the life of Krishna according to the Bhagavata Purana, devotional singing until midnight (the traditional time of Krishna's birth), and fasting (upavasa), amongst other things. Some break their day long fast at midnight with a feast. Krishna Janmashtami is widely celebrated across India and abroad.

== Etymology ==
The meaning of the Sanskrit word Janmashtami can be understood by splitting it into the two words, "Janma" and "Ashtami." The word "Janma" means birth and the word "Ashtami" means eight; thus, Krishna Janmashtami is the celebration of Krishna's birth on the eighth day of the dark fortnight (Krishna Paksha) in the month of Bhadrapada, also called Shravan, which falls in August–September of the Gregorian calendar.

== History ==
Information about Krishna's life is noted in the Mahabharata, the Puranas, and Bhagavata Purana. Krishna is the eighth son of Devaki (mother) and Vasudeva (father). Surrounding the time of his birth, persecution was rampant, freedoms were being denied, and King Kamsa's life was threatened. Krishna was born within a prison in Mathura, India where his parents were constrained by his uncle, Kamsa. During Devaki's wedding, Kamsa was warned by a celestial voice that Devaki's eighth son would be the cause of his death. To prevent the prophecy from coming true, Kamsa imprisoned his sister Devaki and her husband, killing the first six of their newborns shortly after birth. The guards responsible for keeping watch over Devaki's cell fell asleep and the cell doors were miraculously opened at the time of Krishna's birth. These events allowed Vasudeva to send Krishna across the Yamuna River to his foster parents, Yashoda (mother) and Nanda (father). This legend is celebrated on Janmashtami by people keeping fasts, singing devotional songs of love for Krishna, and keeping a vigil into the night.

Throughout Krishna's childhood and young adult life, Balarama, Krishna's half-brother, was a "constant companion" for him. Balarama joined Krishna in the major events that are celebrated in Vraja, Brindavan, Dravarka, and Mathura such as stealing butter, chasing calves, playing in the cow pens, and participating in wrestling matches.

== Observance and celebrations ==
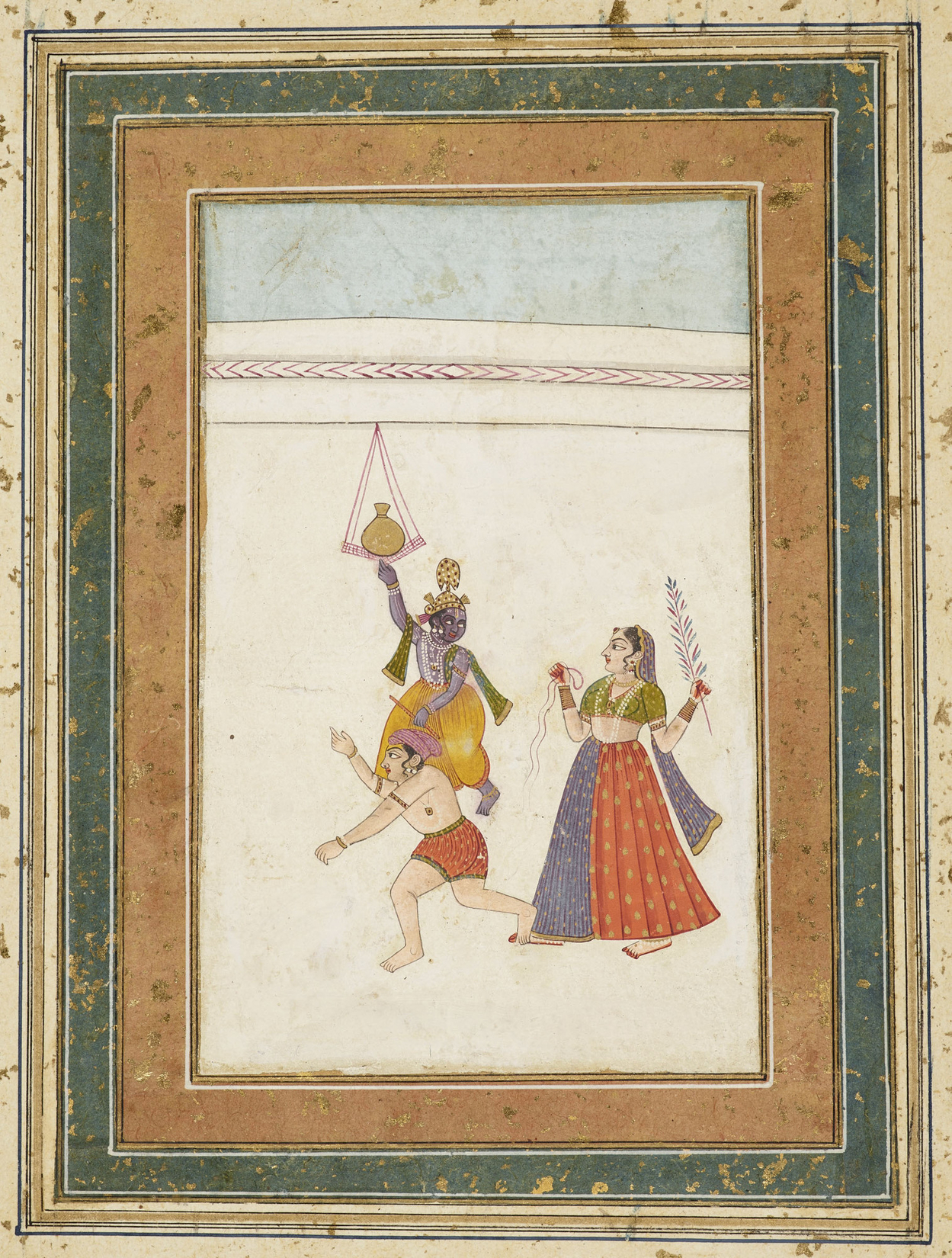
Some communities celebrate Krishna's legends such as him as a Makkan chor (butter thief).

Krishna Janmashtami holds significant importance to Krishnaites as well as Hindus around the world, and it is celebrated in diverse forms depending on their regional and cultural customs. Hindus celebrate Janmashtami by fasting, singing, praying together, preparing and sharing special food, night vigils, and visiting Krishna or Vishnu temples. The places of Mathura and Vrindavan are visited by pilgrims. Some mandirs organize recitation of Bhagavad Gita in the days leading up to Janmashtami. Many communities in North India organize dance-drama events called Rasa Lila or Krishna Lila. The tradition of Rasa Lila is particularly popular in the Mathura region, in northeastern states of India such as Manipur and Assam, and in parts of Rajasthan and Gujarat. It is acted out by numerous teams of amateur artists, cheered on by their local communities, and these drama-dance plays begin a few days before each Janmashtami. People decorate their houses with flowers and light. On this day, people chant "Hare Krishna hare Krishna, Krishna- Krishna Hare Hare". The Janmashtami celebration is followed by Dahi Handi, which is celebrated the next day.

After Krishna's birth at midnight, forms of baby Krishna are bathed and clothed, then placed in a cradle. Devotees then break their fast by sharing food and sweets. Women draw tiny footprints outside their house doors and kitchen, walking towards their house, which is a symbolism for Krishna's journey into their homes.

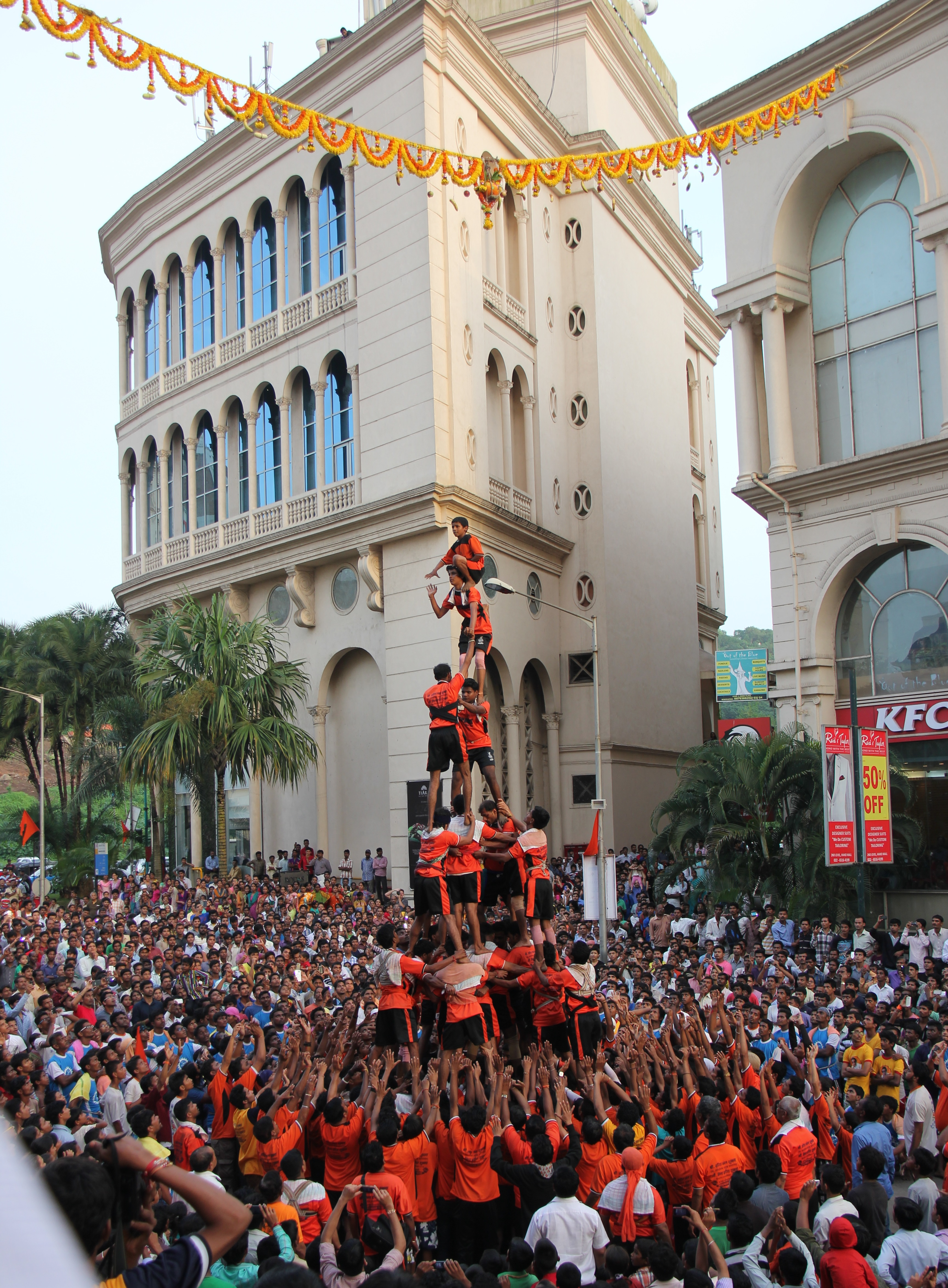
Dahi Handi, a Janmashtami tradition, in progress in Mumbai India.

=== Northern India ===
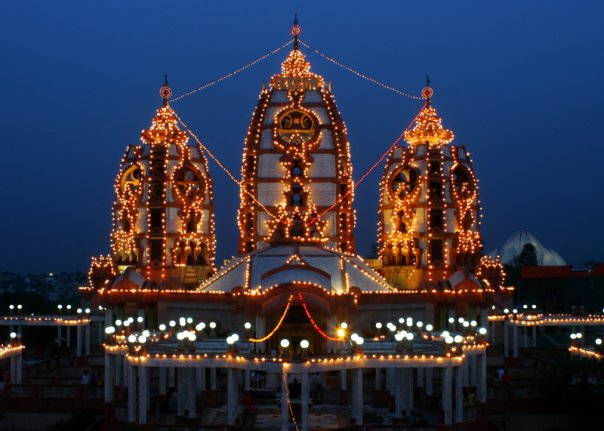
Janmashtami at ISKCON temple, Delhi

Janmashtami is the largest festival in the Braj region of north India, in cities such as Mathura where Krishna was born according to Krishnaism, and in Vrindavan where he grew up. Vaishnava communities in these cities in Uttar Pradesh, as well as others in the state, as well as locations in Rajasthan, Delhi, Haryana, Uttarakhand and Himalayan north celebrate Janmashtami. On the festival day, Krishna temples are decorated and illuminated. Devotees hold bhakti ceremonies and observe an overnight vigil.

The festival typically falls as the monsoons in north India have begun retreating, fields laden with crops and rural communities have time to play. In the northern states, Janmashtami is celebrated with the Raslila tradition, which literally means "play (Lila) of delight, essence (Rasa)". This is expressed as solo or group dance and drama events at Janmashtami, wherein Krishna related compositions are sung, music accompanies the performance, while actors and audience share and celebrate the performance by clapping hands to mark the beat. The childhood pranks of Krishna and the love affairs of Radha-Krishna are particularly popular. According to Christian Roy and other scholars, these Radha-Krishna love stories are Hindu symbolism for the longing and love of the human soul for the divine or Brahman.

Poetry recounting stories about Krishna became popular in the fifteenth and sixteenth centuries within the Braj region, and is written according to a vernacular called "Braj bhasha" (present-day "Hindi/dialect of Hindi). The Braj bhasha poems of Surdas (collectively known as the Sursagar) are recalled, some of which describe the birth and childhood of Krishna.

=== Jammu Region ===
In Jammu region, Janmashtami is commonly known as "Thogre/Thakure da Vrat" (meaning a vrat dedicated to Thakur i.e. Shri Krishna). Observing a Phalaahari Vrat for an entire day is a major ritual of the festival. The day is marked by numerous Phalaahari Dhaams or Bhandaras in the streets of prominent towns in the Jammu region.

Janmashtami marks the beginning of the kite-flying season in the Jammu region whereby locals gather and fly decorated kites from their rooftops. While on the other hand, girls and women decorate their palms by applying Teera, dye of an indigenous plant.

Another ceremony associated with Janmashtami in Jammu region is "Deyaa Parna" in which Dogras donate cereal grains in the name of their ancestors and Kuldevtas. A holy tree called jand is worshipped by women on this day. Special rotis called draupads are prepared and offered to cows and deities.

=== Kashmir ===
Janmashtami is celebrated as Zaram Satam (Janam Saptami) by the native Kashmiri Pandits of Kashmir. The festival is associated with observing a vrat the whole day and visiting the Thokur Kuth (Krishna Mandir) at midnight. At night, puja is performed in the temples which includes performing abhishek (ritual bath) to the murti of Krishna, and singing bhajans (devotional songs). Food items appropriate for fasting, such as gaer or singhada lapsi (made from waterchestnut flour), fruits, and dried fruits are consumed on this day.

=== Maharashtra ===
Janmashtami (popularly known as "Dahi Handii" in Maharashtra) is celebrated in cities such as Mumbai, Latur, Nagpur and Pune. It is a celebration of joy and facilitator of social oneness. Dahi Handi is an enactment of how Krishna, during his childhood, would steal butter. This story is the theme of numerous reliefs on temples across India, as well as literature and dance-drama repertoire, symbolizing the joyful innocence of children, that love and life's play is the manifestation of god.

It is common practice for youth groups to celebrate the festival by participating in Dahi Handi, which involves hanging a clay pot, filled with buttermilk, at a significant height. Once hung, several youth groups compete to reach the pot by creating a human pyramid and breaking it open. The spilled contents are considered as prasada (celebratory offering). It is a public show, cheered and welcomed as a community event.

=== Gujarat ===
In Dwarka, Gujarat – where Krishna is believed to have established his kingdom – people celebrate the festival with a tradition similar to Dahi Handi, called Makhan Handi (pot with freshly churned butter). Others perform folk dances such and garba and raas, sing bhajans, and visit Krishna temples such as at the Dwarkadhish Temple or Nathdwara. In the Kutch district region, farmers decorate their bullock carts and take out Krishna processions, with group singing and dancing. The day is of special importance to followers of the Pushtimarg and the Swaminarayan movement.

The works of Gujarati poets, Narsinh Mehta (1414–1480 c.e.), Dayaram (1777–1852) and Rajasthani poet Mirabai (c.1500), are popularly revisited and sung during Janmashtami. Their works are categorized as part of the bhakti tradition, or devotional poetry dedicated to Krishna.

=== South India ===
In Kerala, people celebrate Janmashtami in September, according to the Malayalam calendar.

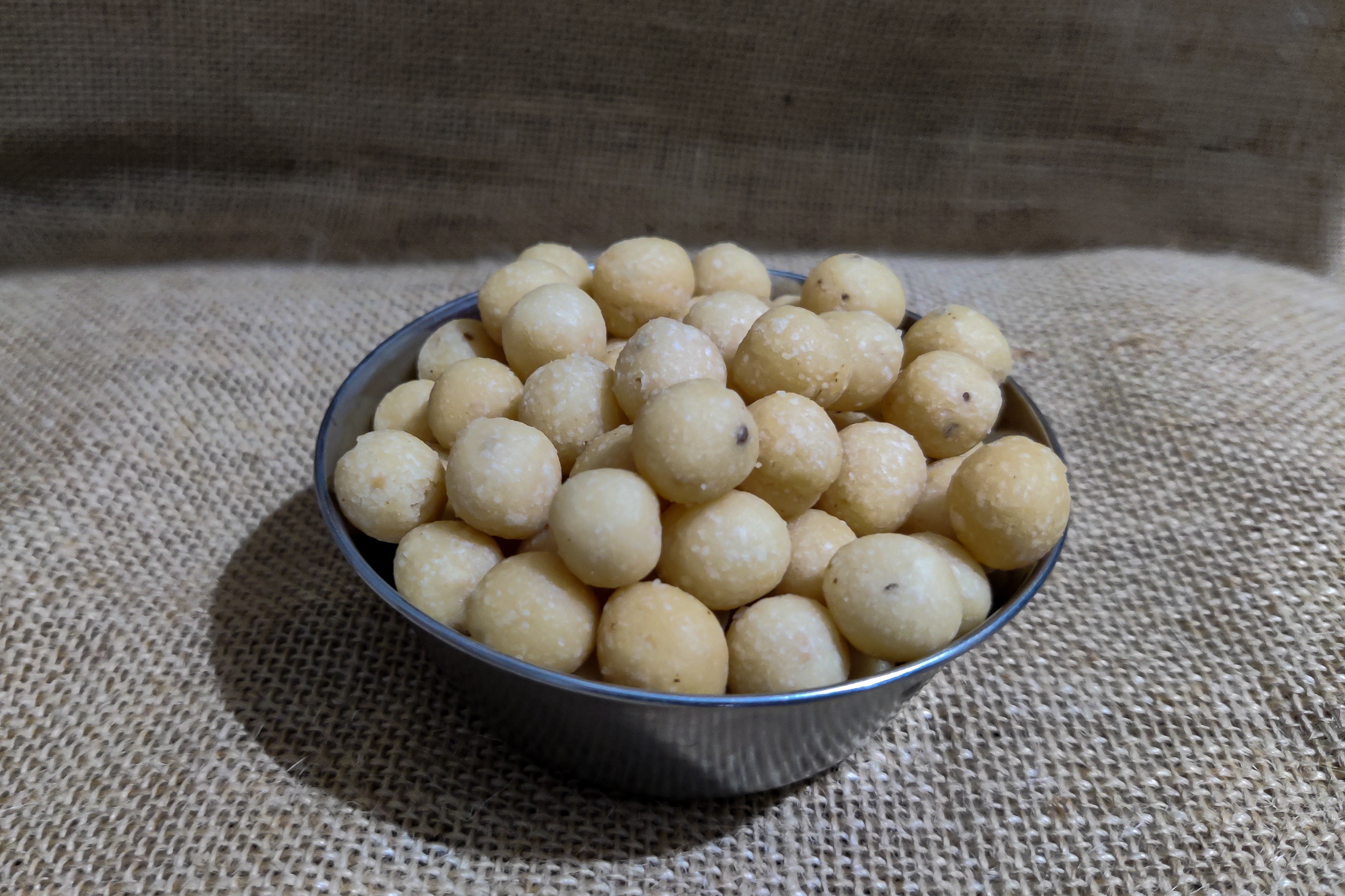
Seedai prepared specially on Krishna Janmashtami

In Tamil Nadu, people decorate the floor with kolams (decorative pattern drawn with rice batter). Geetha Govindam and other such devotional songs are sung in praise of Krishna. Little footprints, representing Krishna as a baby, are drawn from the threshold of the house till the pooja (prayer) room, which depicts the arrival of Krishna into the house. Reciting from the Bhagavad Gita is also a popular practice. The offerings made to Krishna include fruits, betel and butter. Milk-based items, such as sweet seedai and verkadalai urundai, are prepared. The festival is celebrated in the evening as Krishna was born at midnight. Most people observe a strict fast on this day.

A toddler dressed like Krishna

In Andhra Pradesh and Telangana, recitation of shlokas and devotional songs are the characteristics of this festival. Another unique feature of this festival is that young boys are dressed up as Krishna and they visit neighbours and friends. The people of Andhra Pradesh observe a fast too. Various kinds of sweets such as chakodi, murukku, and seedai are offered to Krishna on this day. Joyful chanting of Krishna's name takes place in quite a few temples of the state. The number of temples dedicated to Krishna are few. The reason being that people have taken to worship him through paintings and not idols.

Popular south Indian temples dedicated to Krishna are Rajagopalaswamy Temple in Mannargudi in the Tiruvarur district, Pandavadhoothar temple in Kanchipuram, Sri Krishna temple at Udupi, and the Krishna temple at Guruvayur are dedicated to the memory of Vishnu's incarnation as Krishna. It is believed that the murti (idol) of Krishna installed in Guruvayur temple is originally from his kingdom in Dwarka – which is believed to be submerged in the sea.

=== Eastern and Northeastern India ===
Janmashtami is widely celebrated by Krishnaite and Hindu Vaishnava communities of eastern India and northeastern India. The widespread tradition of celebrating Krishna in these regions is credited to the efforts and teachings of 15th and 16th century Sankardeva and Chaitanya Mahaprabhu. Sankardeva introduced the musical composition, Borgeet, and dance-drama styles – Ankia Naat and Sattriya - that is now popular in West Bengal and Assam. In Manipur state, a traditional dance - Raas Leela - inspired by the theme of love and devotion between Krishna, Radha and the gopis, is enacted using the Manipuri dance style. The contextual roots of these dance drama arts are found in the ancient text Natya Shastra, but with influences from the culture fusion between India and southeast Asia.

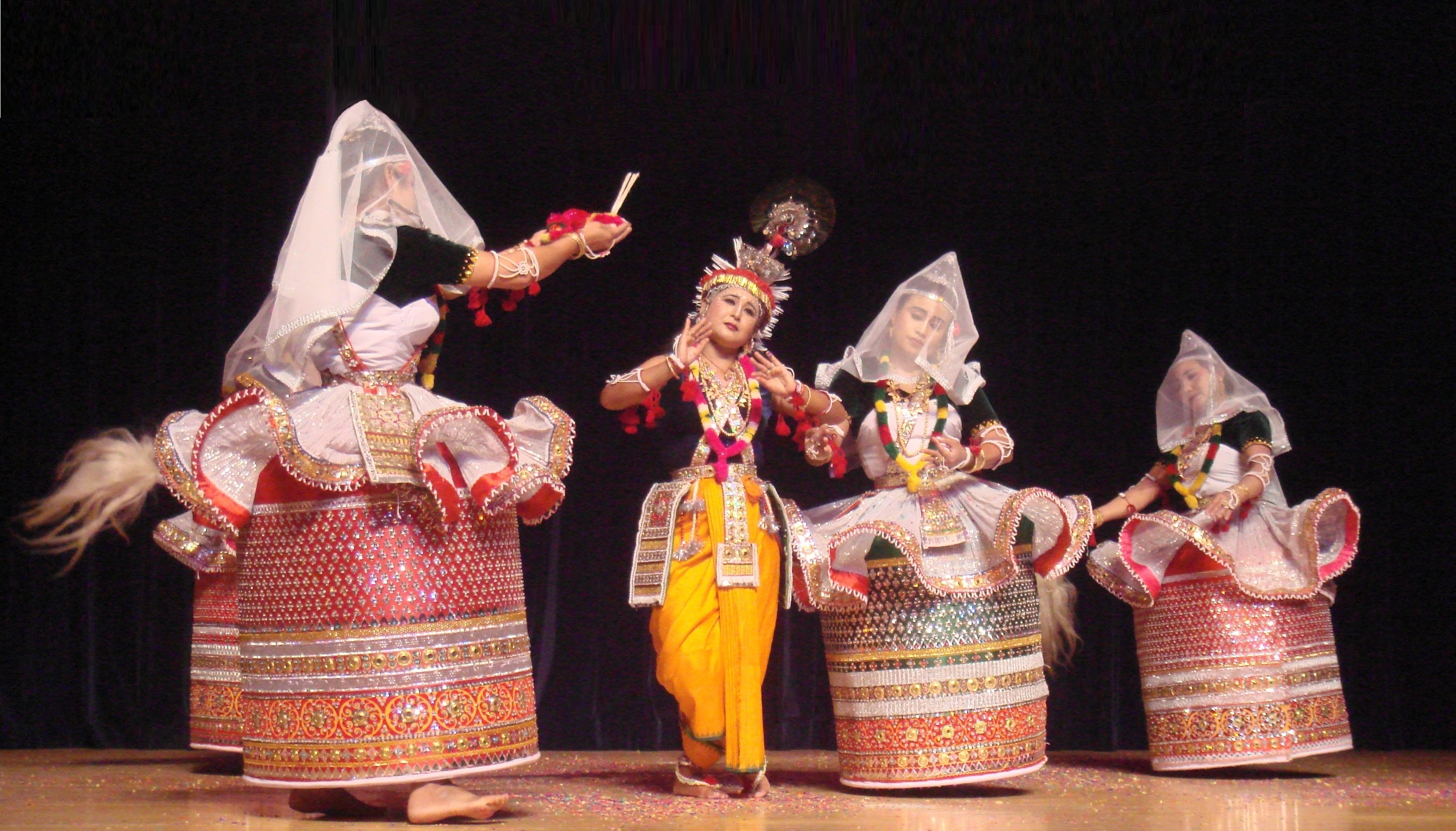
Rasa lila in Manipuri dance style

On Janmashtami, parents dress up their children as Krishna or the gopis. Temples and community centers are decorated with regional flowers and leaves, while groups recite or listen to the tenth chapter of the Bhagavata Purana, and the Bhagavata Gita.

Janmashtami is a major festival celebrated with fasts, overnight worship, recitation of scriptures and Krishna prayers in Manipur. Dancers performing Raslila are a notable annual tradition during Janmashtami in Mathura and Vrindavan. Children play the Likol Sannaba game in the Meetei Krishnaite community.

The Shree Govindajee Temple and the ISKCON temples particularly mark the Janmashtami festival. Janmashtami is celebrated in Assam at homes, in community centers called Namghars (Assamese: নামঘৰ). According to the tradition, the devotees sing the Nam, perform pujas and sharing food and Prasada.

==== Odisha and West Bengal ====
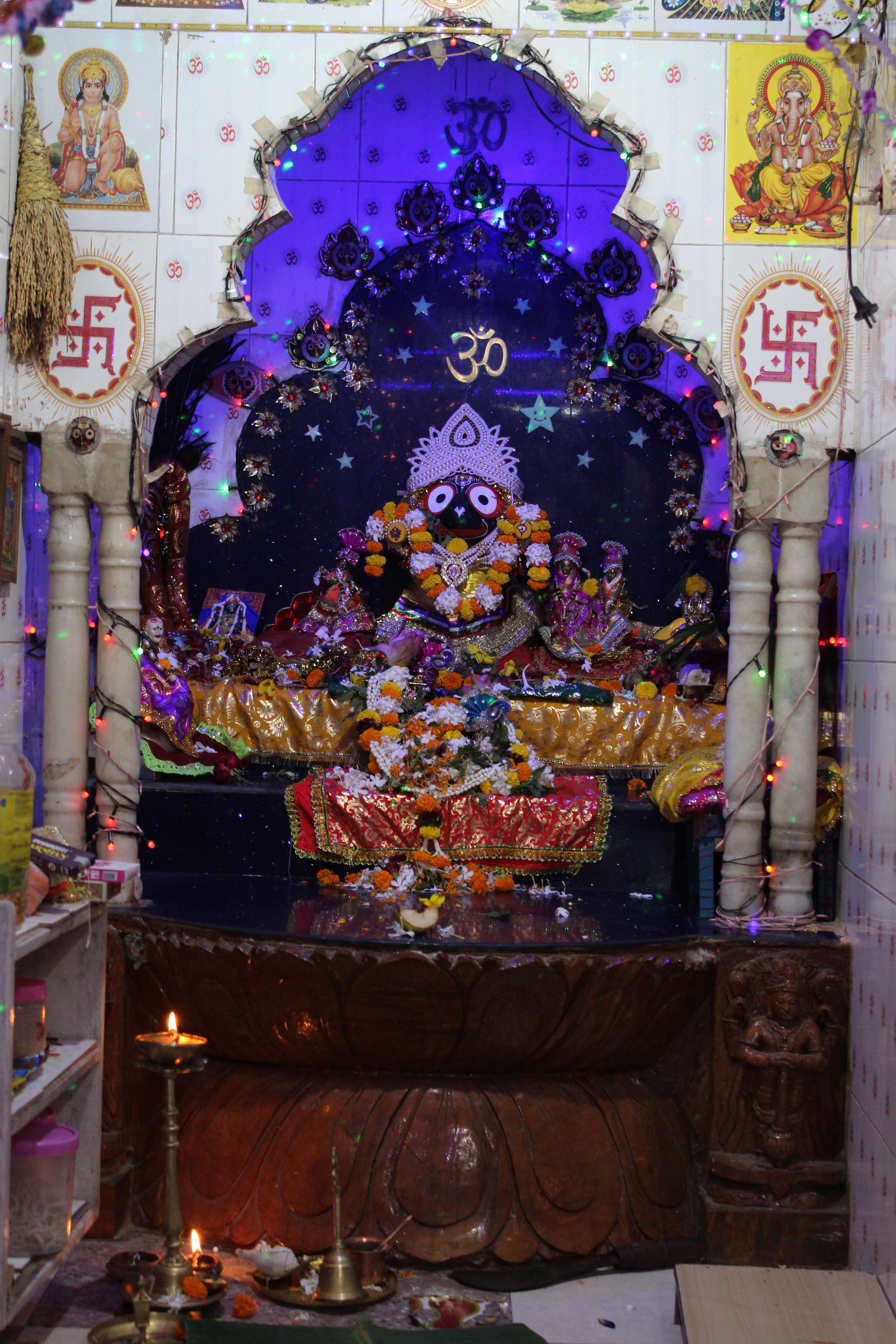
Janmashtami Puja in Odia family

In the eastern state of Odisha, specifically the region around Puri and in Nabadwip, West Bengal, the festival is also referred to as Sri Krishna Jayanti or simply Sri Jayanti. People celebrate Janmashtami by fasting and worship until midnight. The Bhagavata Purana is recited from the 10th chapter, a section dedicated to the life of Krishna. The next day is called "Nanda Ucchhaba" or the joyous celebration of Krishna's foster parents Nanda and Yashoda. Devotees keep fasting during the entire day of Janmashtami. They bring water from Ganga to bathe Radha Madhaba during their abhisheka ceremony. A grand abhisheka is performed at midnight for the small Radha Madha. In Odisha, the Jagannath Temple in Puri, best known for its grand Ratha Yatra celebrations, perform a Ratha Yatra during Janmashtami.

== Outside India ==
=== Nepal ===
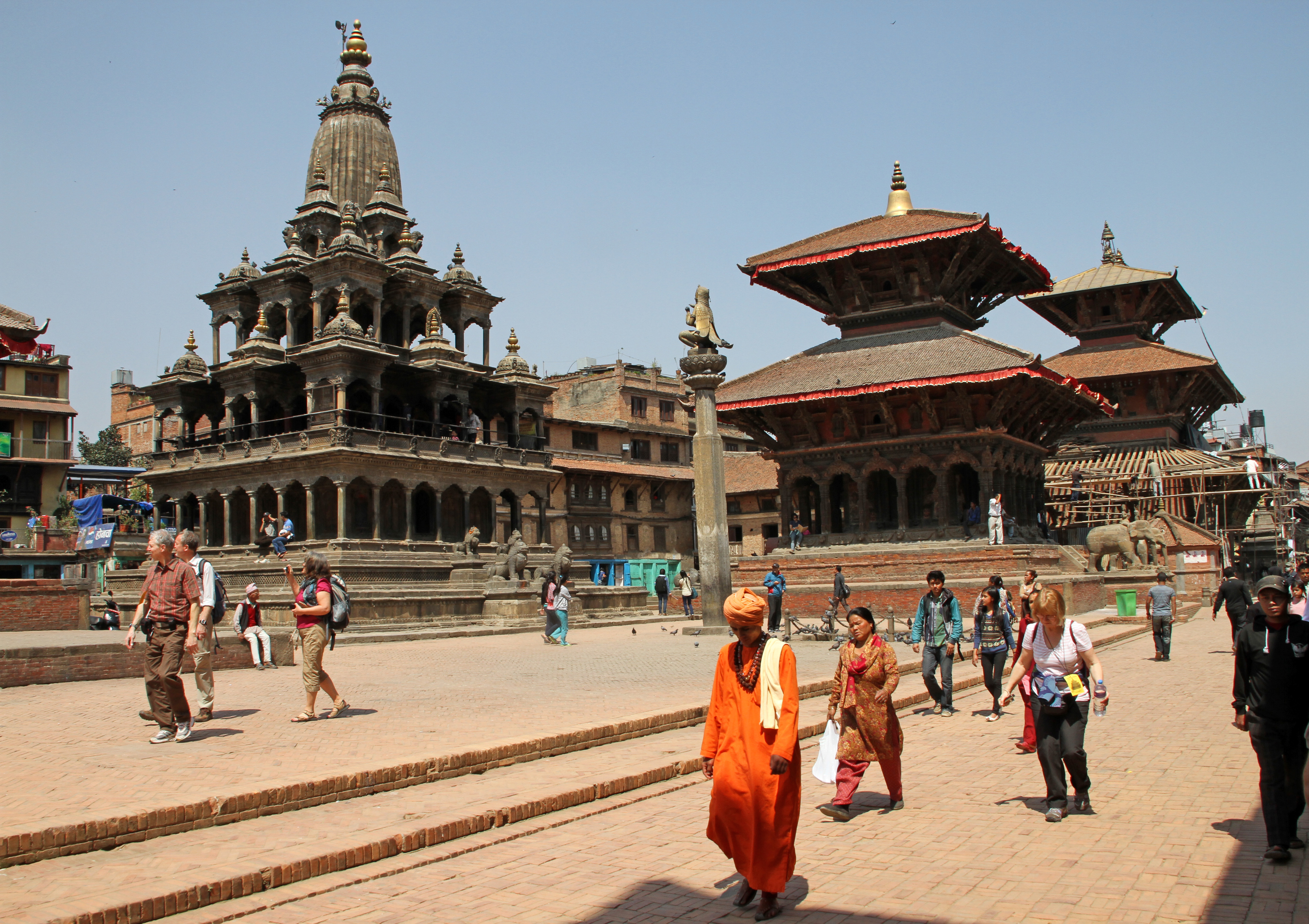
Krishna Mandir in Patan, Nepal.

About eighty percent of the population of Nepal identify themselves as Hindus and celebrate Krishna Janmashtami. They observe Janmashtami by fasting until midnight. It is a national holiday in Nepal. The devotees recite the Bhagavad Gita and sing religious songs called bhajans and kirtans. The temples of Krishna are decorated. Shops, posters and houses carry Krishna motifs.

=== Bangladesh ===
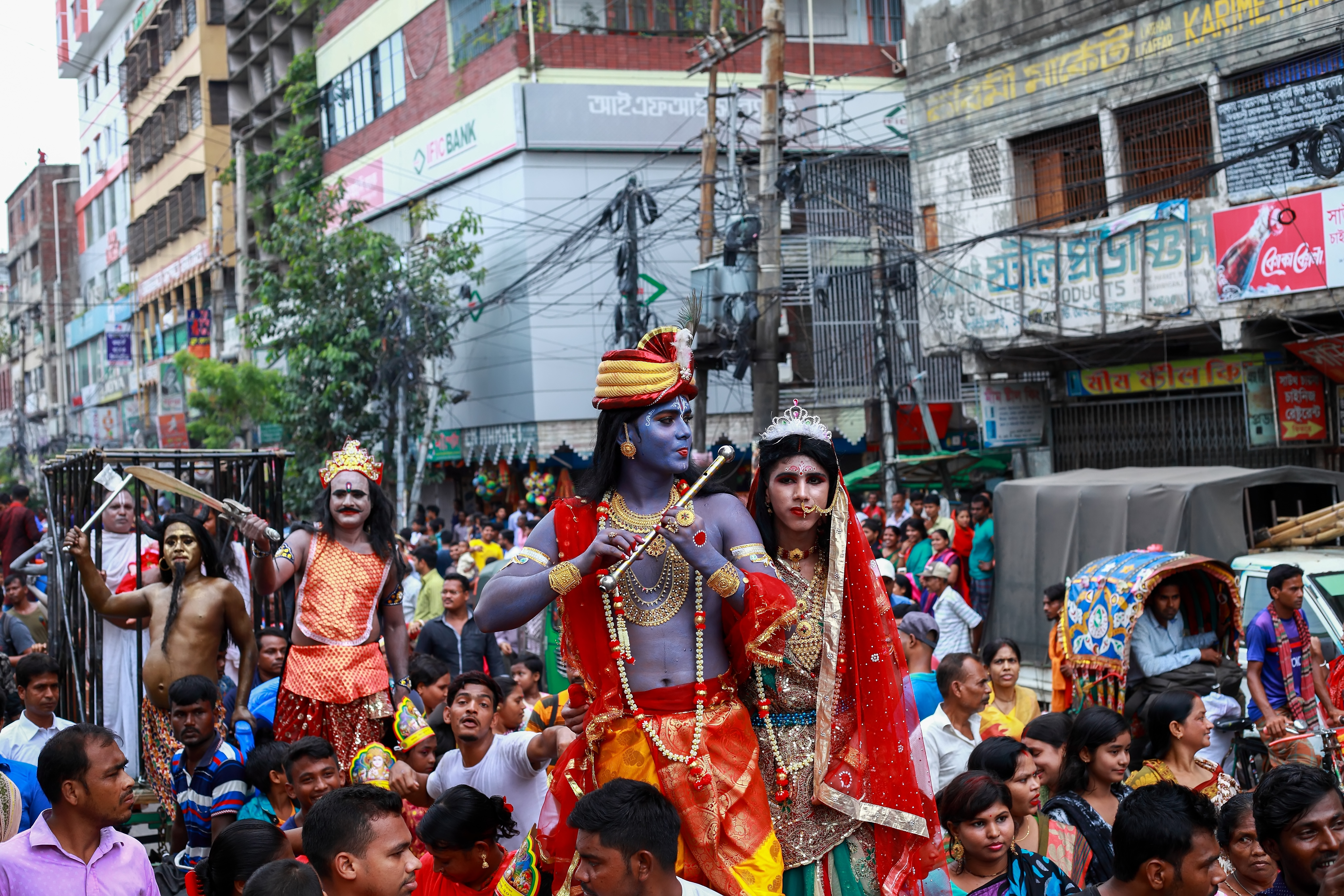
Janmashtami celebrations in Dhaka

Janmashtami is a national holiday in Bangladesh. On Janmashtami, a procession starts from Dhakeshwari Temple in Dhaka, the National Temple of Bangladesh, and then proceeds through the streets of Old Dhaka. The procession dates back to 1902, but was stopped in 1948. The procession was resumed in 1989.

=== Fiji ===
At least a quarter of the population in Fiji practices Hinduism, and this holiday has been celebrated in Fiji since the first Indian indentured laborers landed there. Janmashtami in Fiji is known as "Krishna Ashtami". Most Hindus in Fiji have ancestors that originated from Uttar Pradesh, Bihar, and Tamil Nadu, making this an especially important festival for them. Fiji's Janmashtami celebrations are unique in that they last for eight days, leading up to the eighth day, the day Krishna was born. During these eight days, Hindus gather at homes and at temples with their 'mandalis,' or devotional groups at evenings and night, and recite the Bhagavat Purana, sing devotional songs for Krishna, and distribute Prasadam.

=== Pakistan ===
Janmashtami is celebrated by Pakistani Hindus in the Shri Swaminarayan Mandir in Karachi with the singing of bhajans and delivering of sermons on Krishna. It is an optional holiday in Pakistan. Prior to the Partition of India, Dera Ghazi Khan was the center of a Janmashtami fair at the thallā of Kevalarāma. This fair is now recreated in Inder Puri, New Delhi.

=== Others ===
In Arizona, United States, Governor Janet Napolitano was the first American leader to greet a message on Janmashtami, while acknowledging ISKCON.

== See also ==
- Krishna Janmasthan Temple Complex
- Radhashtami
- Jai Shri Krishna
- Bhadrapad
- Radha Krishna
- Seventh of Adar
- Musi River (India)
