= Sooji toast =

Indian snack food

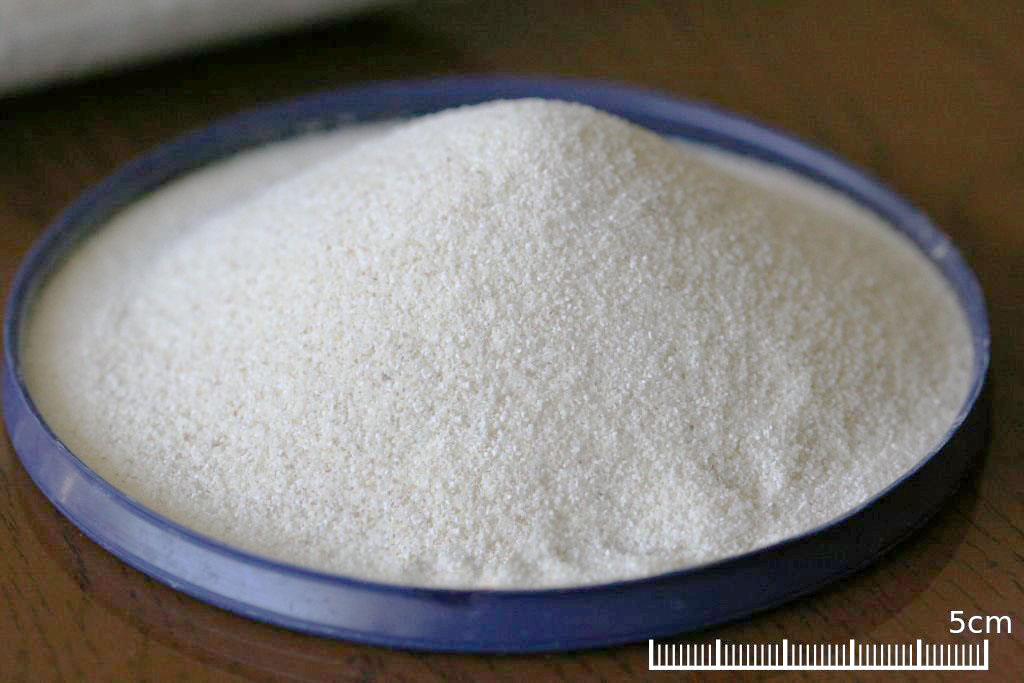
Sooji, also known as semolina

Sooji toast is an Indian snack food or breakfast food that is made from bread and sooji (coarse and grainy durum wheat middlings).

== Recipe ==
Sooji is soaked in curd or buttermilk (preferably medium sour in taste) for 15 minutes. Salt can be added to taste. Other ingredients that can be added to enhance the flavour are tiny chopped pieces of green chili, onion, tomato, ginger and a pinch of jeera. This mixture is applied on one side of a loaf of bread and toasted on a flat pan with a pinch of butter or ghee or cooking oil on a low flame. Once it turns golden brown, the second side is toasted.

The loaf can then be cut diagonally for easy serving and eating. It can be had as it is or with sauce or ketchup or chutney, depending on personal taste.

== See also ==
- List of bread dishes
- List of toast dishes
