= Chakodi =

Indian snack

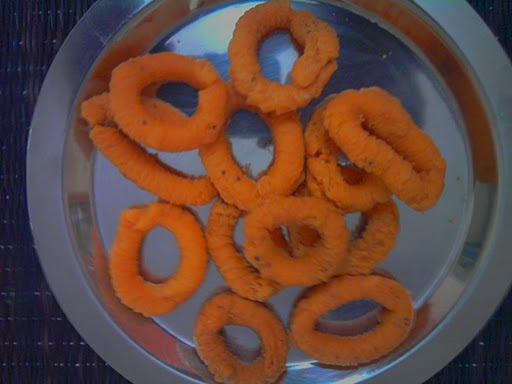
- Type: Snack
- Place of origin: India
- Region or state: Andhra Pradesh, Telangana
- Main ingredients: Rice flour

Chakodi, also known as chagodi, is a hot and crunchy Indian snack. It is made with rice flour and is round in shape.

== Ingredients ==
Chakodi are made from rice flour and chilli powder.

== See also ==
- Chakli
- List of Indian snack foods
