= Makka Poha =

Indian snack food

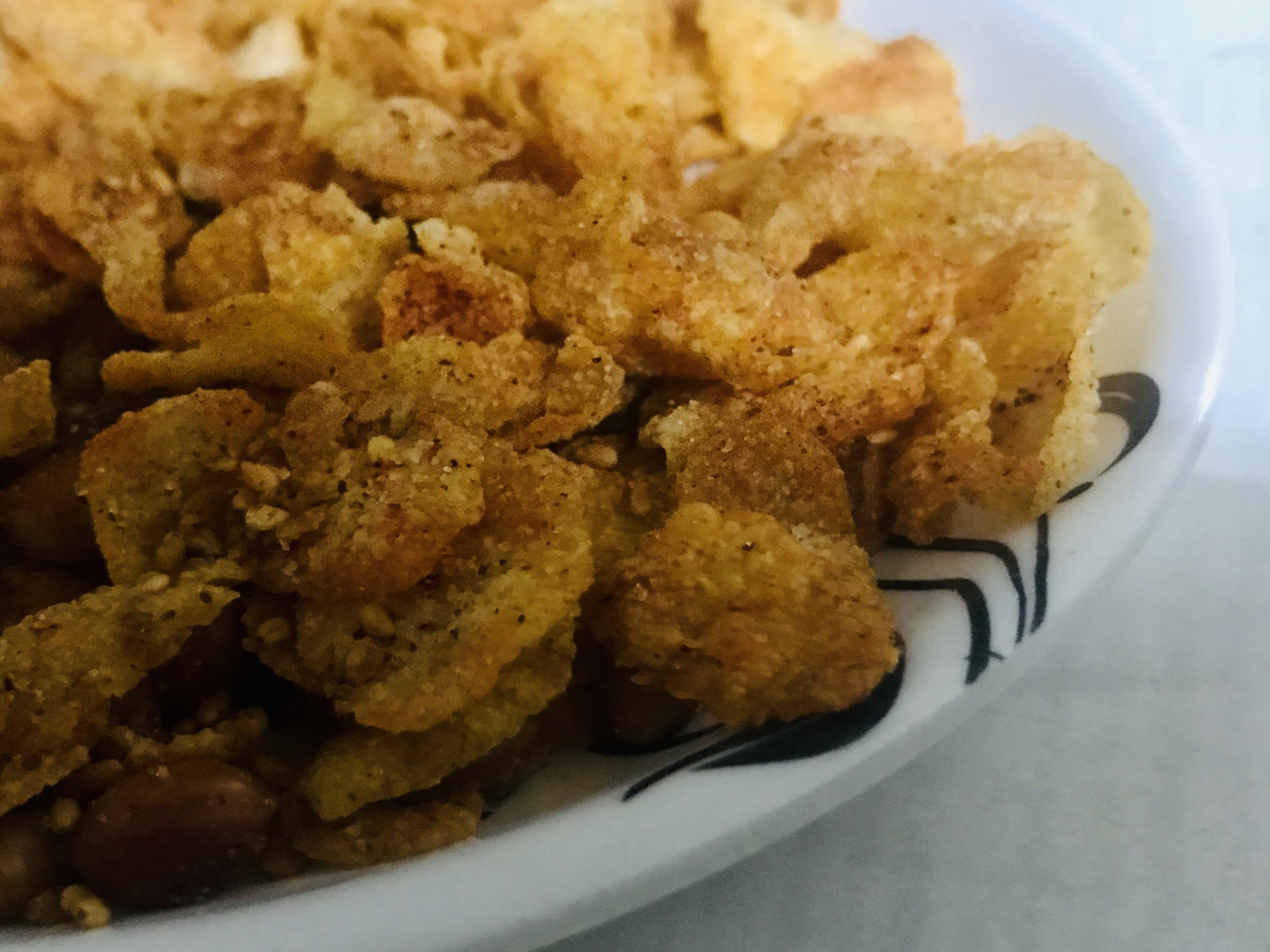
- Alternative names: Corn flakes, maize flakes
- Place of origin: India
- Region or state: Gujarat

Makka poha or Makai poha is part of Indian Gujarati cuisine. It can also be referred to as corn or maize flakes, but unlike the breakfast cereal cornflakes, these are not ready to eat.

Makka poha is usually fried in hot oil so it puffs up, for consumption as a snack. It is an important ingredient of the farsan (savoury) chevda.
