= Chana Jor Garam =

Indian snack food

Chana Jor Garam is a common street snack in most Indian states. It is usually made from chickpeas that are roasted and spiced. The chickpeas are soaked, dried and fried, and then flattened into small discs. The main ingredients are freshly chopped tomatoes, onion, few spices and a green chutney. It has a zesty and tart flavor. It is eaten with onion, lemon, tomato and green chilies. It is enjoyed both as a snack or as a crunchy addition to side dishes.

== Names ==
Chana Jor Garam is a common name in different states of India. In some states it is also spelled as Chana Zor Garam or Chana Chor Garam.

Bollywood has also popularized the snack mentioning the snack in songs from films like Bandhan (1939),Naya Andaz (1956) and Kranti (1981).

== See also ==
- Pani puri
- Bhel puri
