= Bhoonja =

Eastern Indian snack

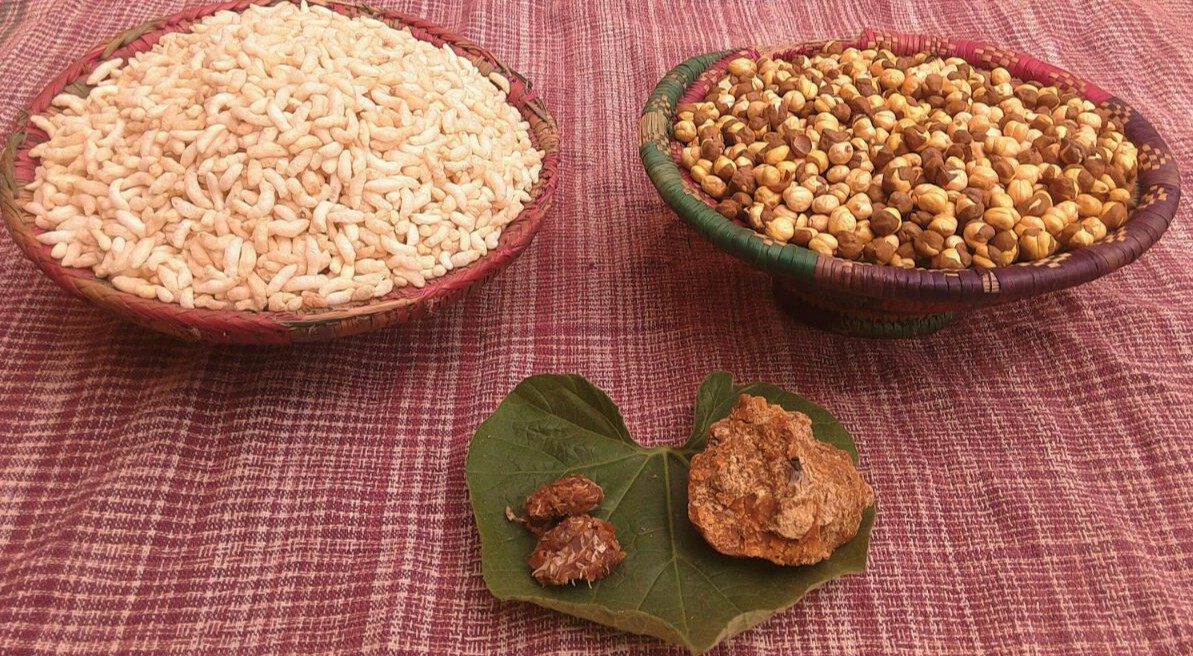
- Type: Snack
- Course: Snack
- Place of origin: India
- Region or state: Bhojpuri region, Bihar, Odisha
- Main ingredients: Rice, peanuts, spiced pulses, seb, Maize, Black Gram, onion, green chilly

Bhooja (Bhojpuri: 𑂦𑂴𑂔𑂰, romanized: Bhōjā) is one of many typical evening snacks consumed in East India. It is available in varied versions under varied names across the Northern plains.

Ingredients include specially roasted rice, mixture of peanuts, various spiced pulses, seb (salty fried beans), coconut dried-ups, spices, salt and mustard.
