= Ganthiya =

Indian snack food

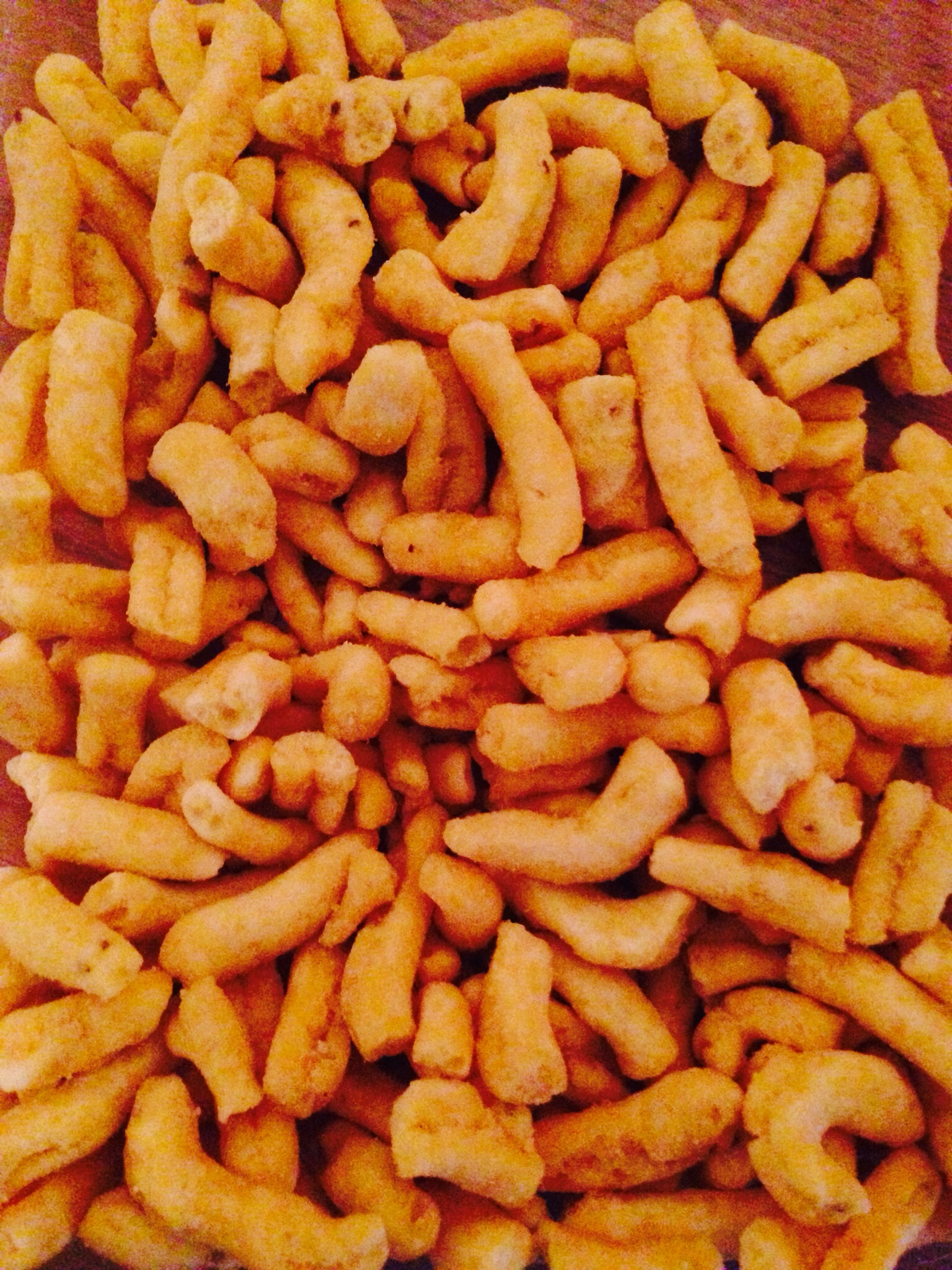
Bhavnagari Ganthiya

Ganthiya (Gujarati: ગાંઠિયા/ગાંઠીયા) are deep-fried Indian snacks made from chickpea flour. Along with Khakhra, Fafda, Dhokla, and Khandvi (among others), they are among the most popular snacks originating from the Indian state of Gujarat. They are a popular teatime snack not only in Gujarat but across India and also among non-resident Indians across the world. They are sometimes soft and not always crunchy like most other Indian snacks. A flatter flakier version is called papdi ganthiya. A sweeter version is called Mitha Ganthiya. Bhavnagar city of Gujarat is famous for its variety of Ganthiya. Ganthia is part of a category of snack food called Farsan.

== Preparation ==
Besan (chickpea flour), chili powder, turmeric, ajwain (carom seeds) and salt are mixed along with water to form a stiff dough. The dough is placed in a sev making machine, fixed with a thick sev plate. This machine is called a sev sancha. The ganthiya are pressed out in a crank circular motion into hot oil. They are turned over and fried till crisp. Then they are lifted out from the oil and drained on absorbent paper before being stored in an airtight jar.
