= Dahi vada =

Indian snack food

Dahi vada Dahi bada
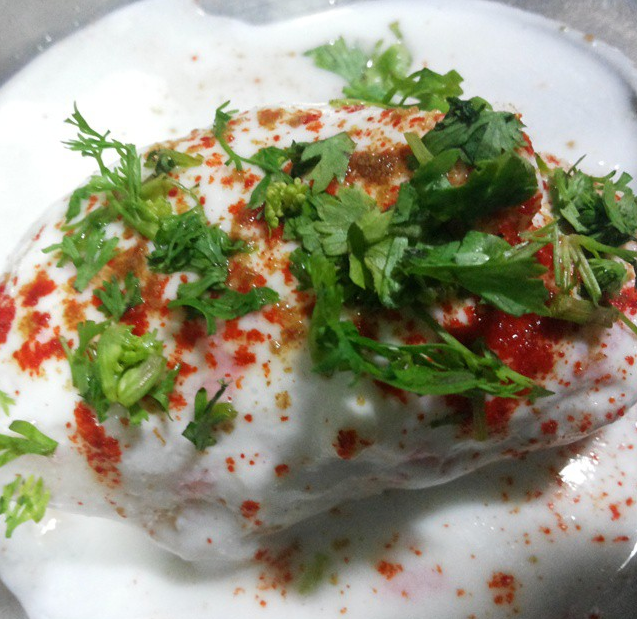
- Dahi vada
- Type: Chaat
- Place of origin: Indian subcontinent
- Region or state: Punjab
- Associated cuisine: Indian, Pakistani, Bangladeshi
- Serving temperature: Cold
- Main ingredients: Vada, dahi (yogurt)
- Variations: Bihari Dahi Bada Rajasthani Dahi Bada, Bengali Doi Bora, Delhi Dahi Bhalla, Odia dahi bara,, (Pakistan) Karachi Dahi Baray, Dahi Bhallay, Dahi Pallay

Dahi vada, Dahi bada (Devanagari: दही वड़ा) or Dahi baaraa (Bhojpuri: 𑂠𑂯𑂲 𑂥𑂰𑂩𑂰) is a type of chaat (snack) originating from the Indian subcontinent. It is prepared by soaking vadas (fried lentil balls) in thick dahi (curd).

== Names ==
Dahi vada is also known as "dahi vade" (दही वडे) in Marathi, dahi barey/dahi balley (دہی بھلے/دہی بڑے) in Urdu, dahi bada/dahi vada (दही बड़ा/दही वड़ा) in Hindi, dahi bhalla (دہی بھلا/ਦਹੀ ਭੱਲਾ) in Punjabi, thayir vadai (தயிர் வடை) in Tamil, thairu vada (തൈര് വട) in Malayalam, perugu vada in Telugu, mosaru vade(ಮೊಸರು ವಡೆ) in Kannada, dahi bara (ଦହି ବରା) in Odia and doi bora (দই বড়া) in Bengali. In Bhojpuri, it's called Dahī Baaraa (𑂠𑂯𑂲 𑂥𑂰𑂩𑂰).

== History ==
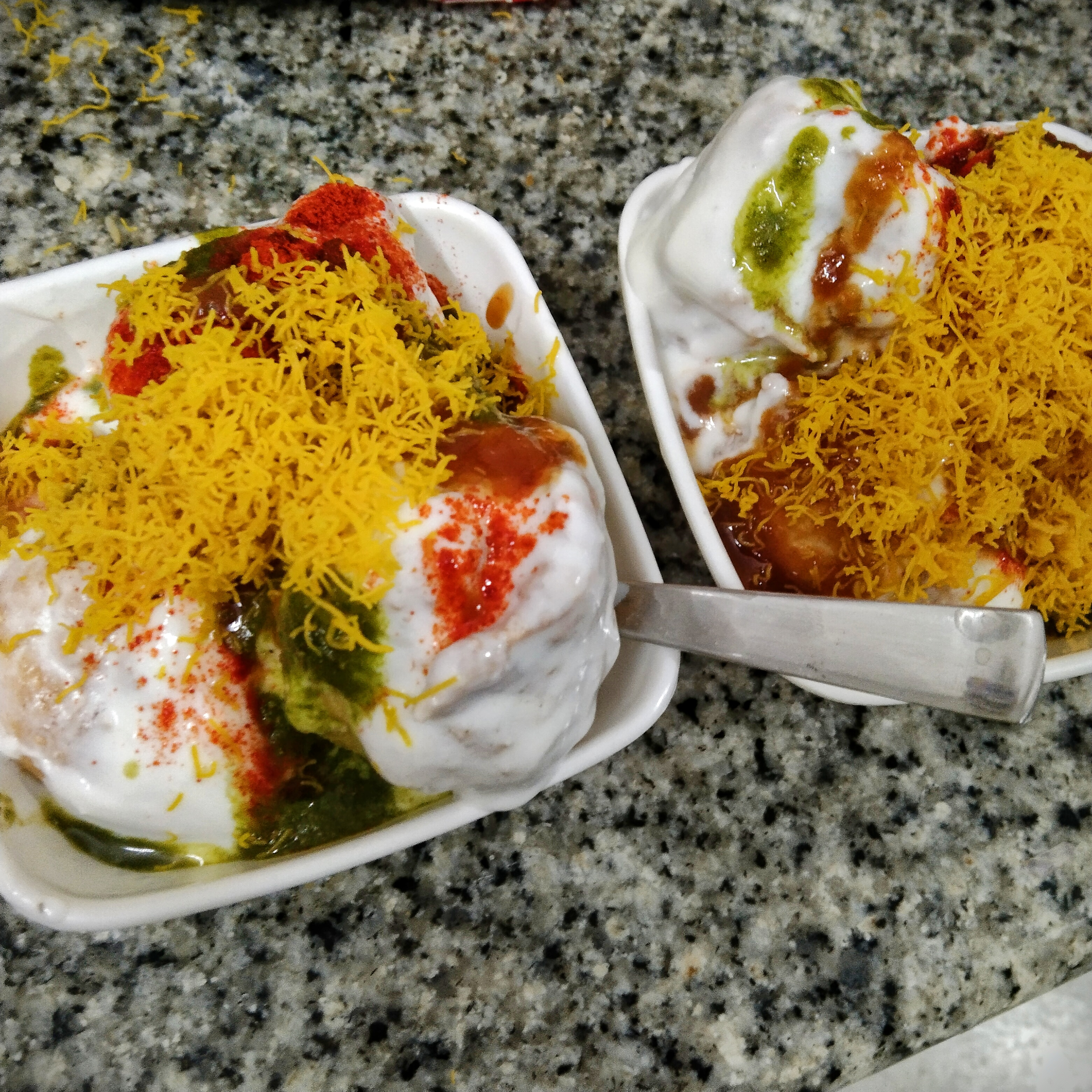
Dahi vada chaat

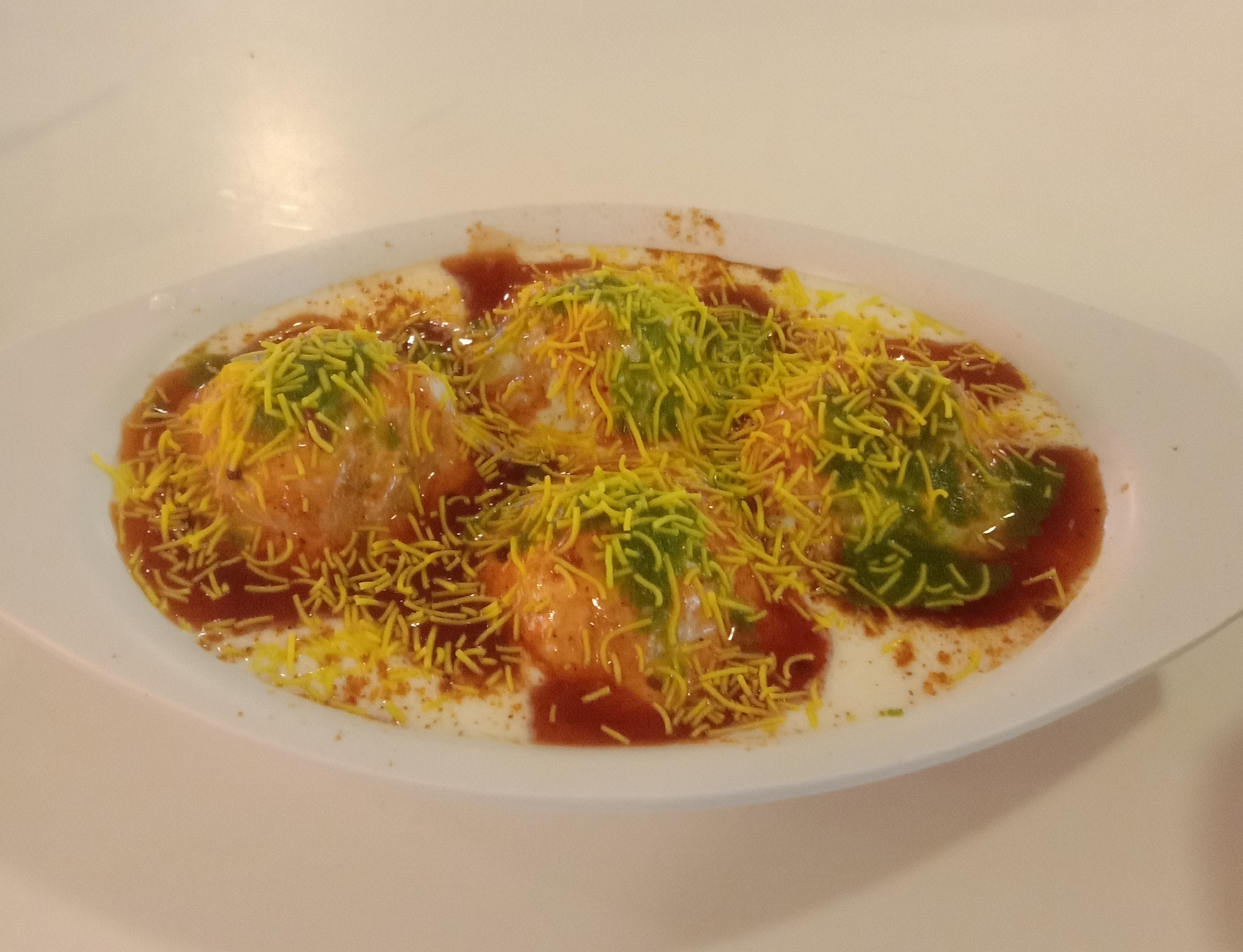
A plate full of Dahi vadas in West Bengal

A recipe for dahi wada (as kshiravata) is mentioned in Manasollasa, a 12th-century Sanskrit encyclopedia compiled by Someshvara III, who ruled from present-day Karnataka. Today, dahi vada is prepared on festival such as Holi.

== Preparation ==
Washed urad lentils are soaked overnight and ground into a batter for the vada, then cooked in hot oil. The hot deep-fried vadas are first put in water and then transferred to thick beaten yogurt. The vadas are soaked for a period of time before serving. Additions to the batter may also include golden raisins. Vadas may be topped with coriander or mint leaves, chilli powder, crushed black pepper, chaat masala, cumin, shredded coconut, green chilies, boondi, thinly sliced fresh ginger, or pomegranate. Sweeter curd is preferred in some places in India, especially in Maharashtra and Gujarat, although the garnishing remains the same. A combination of coriander and tamarind chutney is often used as a garnish. The batter can be made using chickpea flour too.

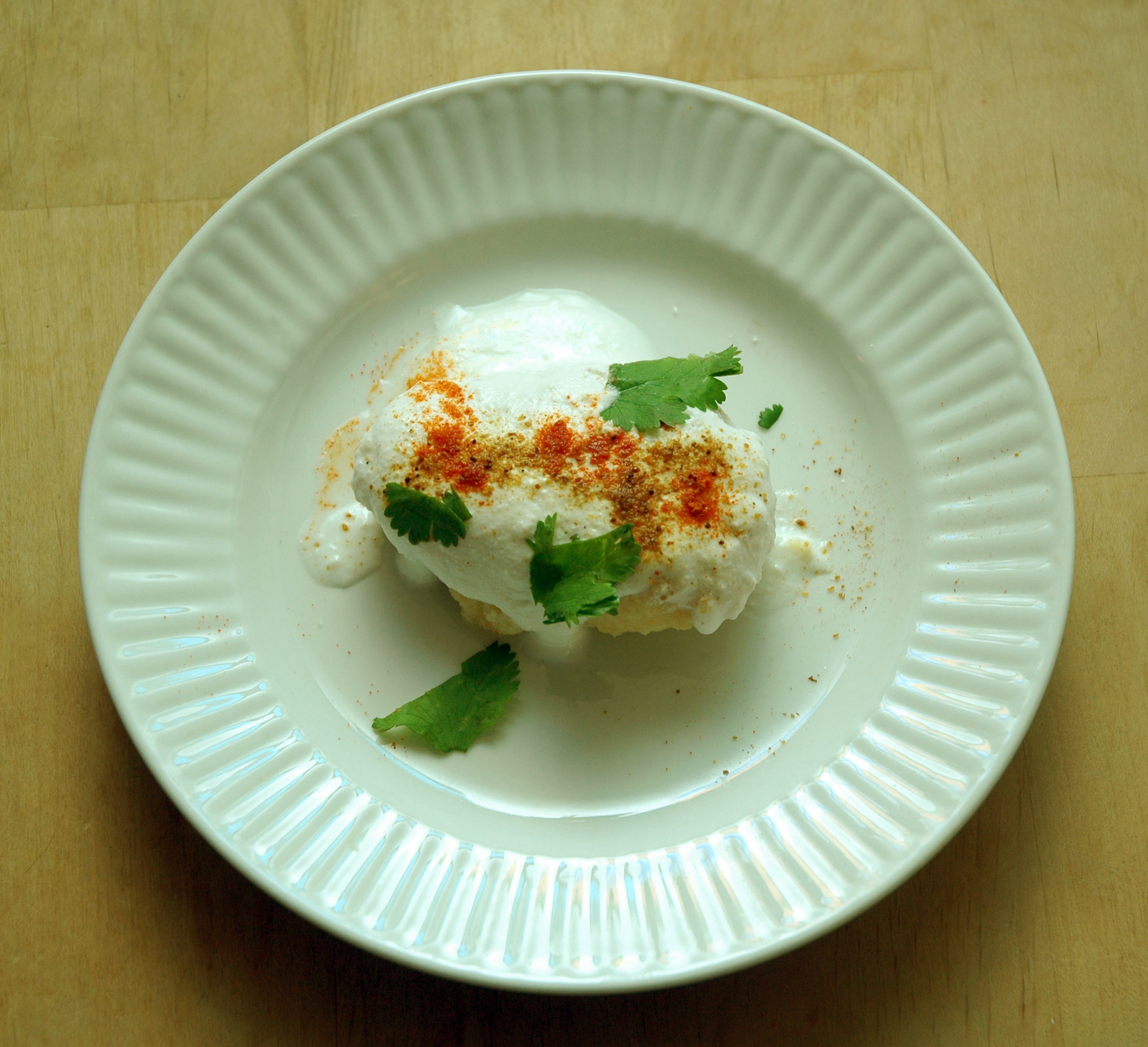

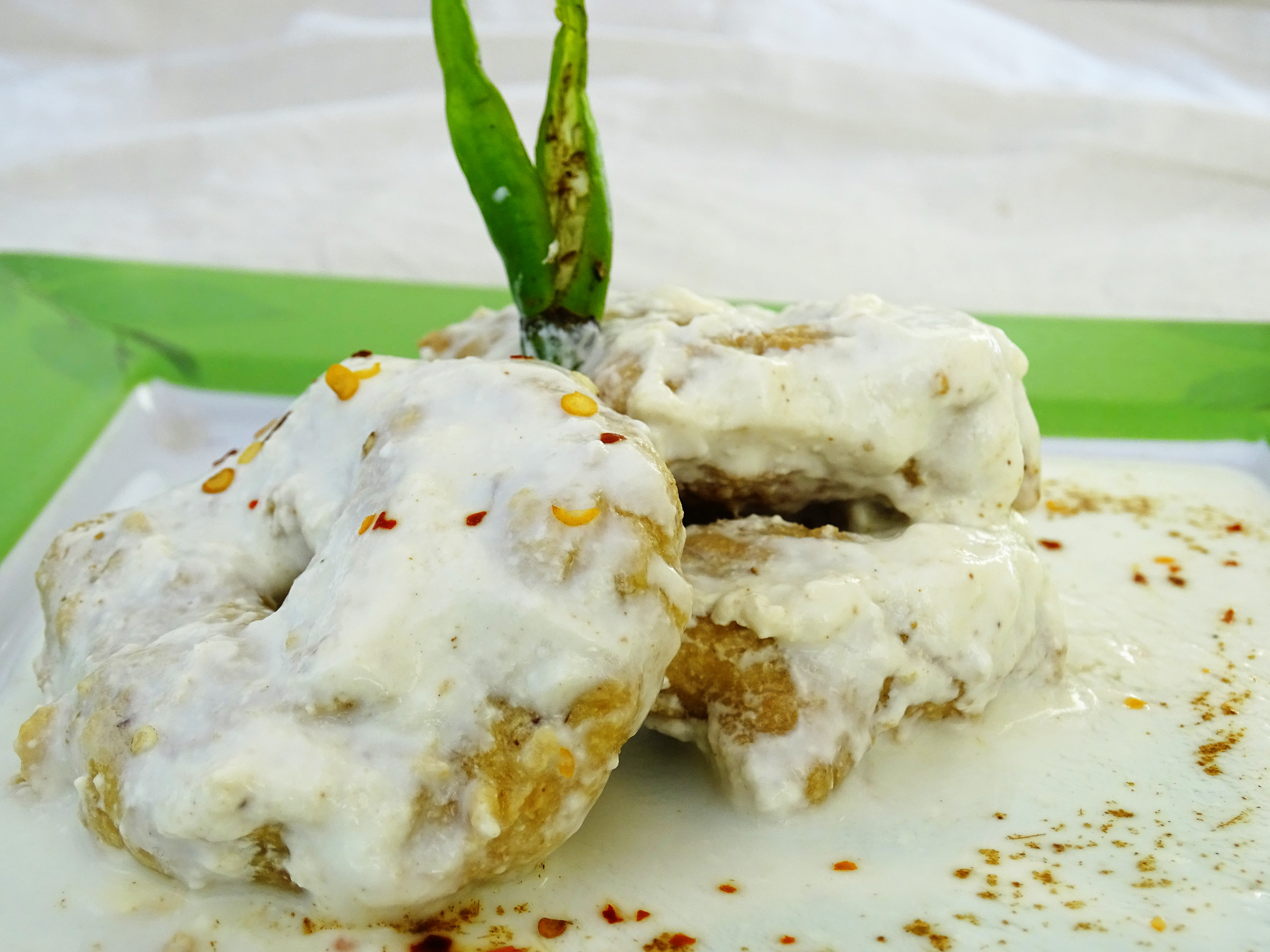

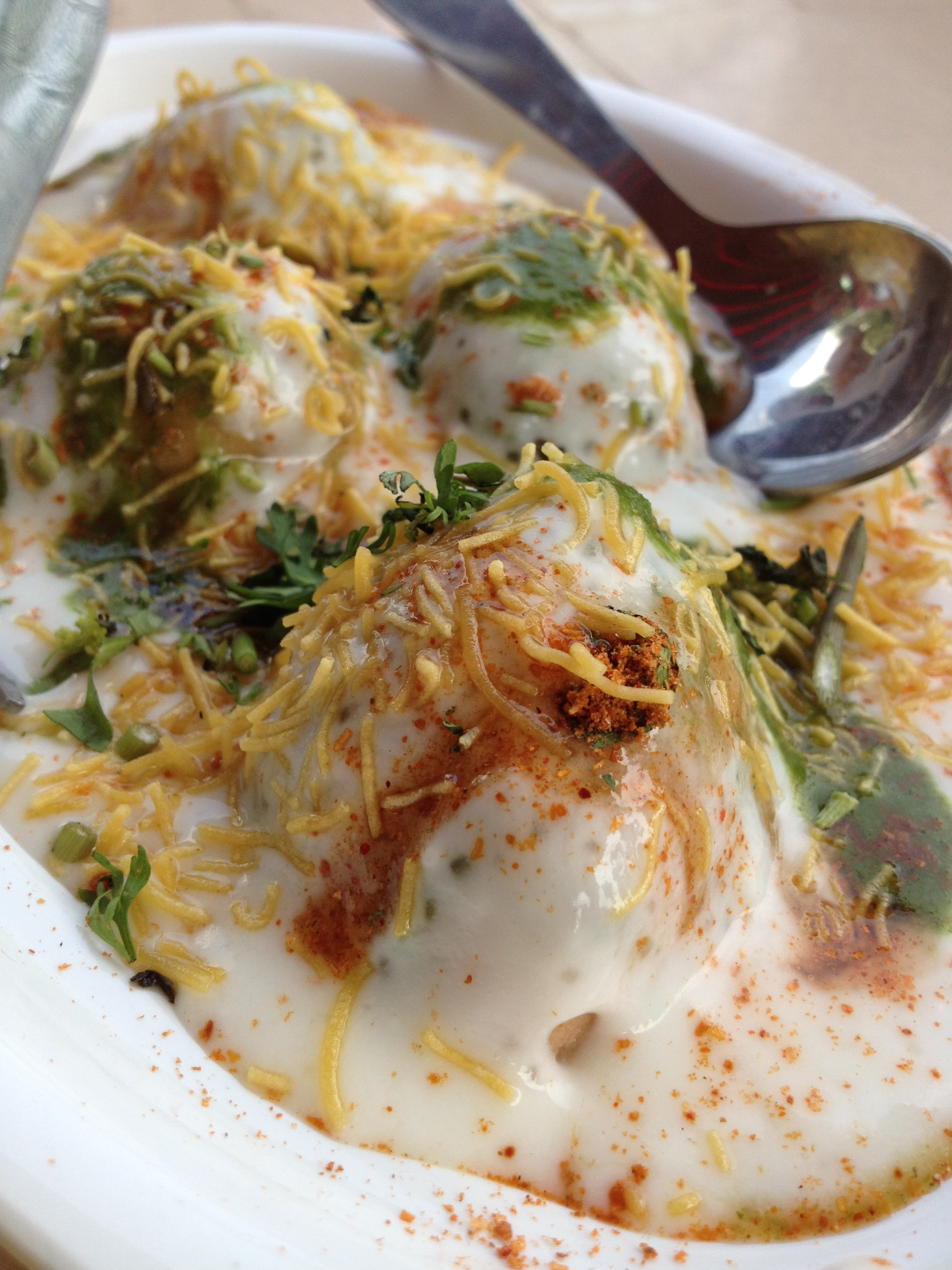

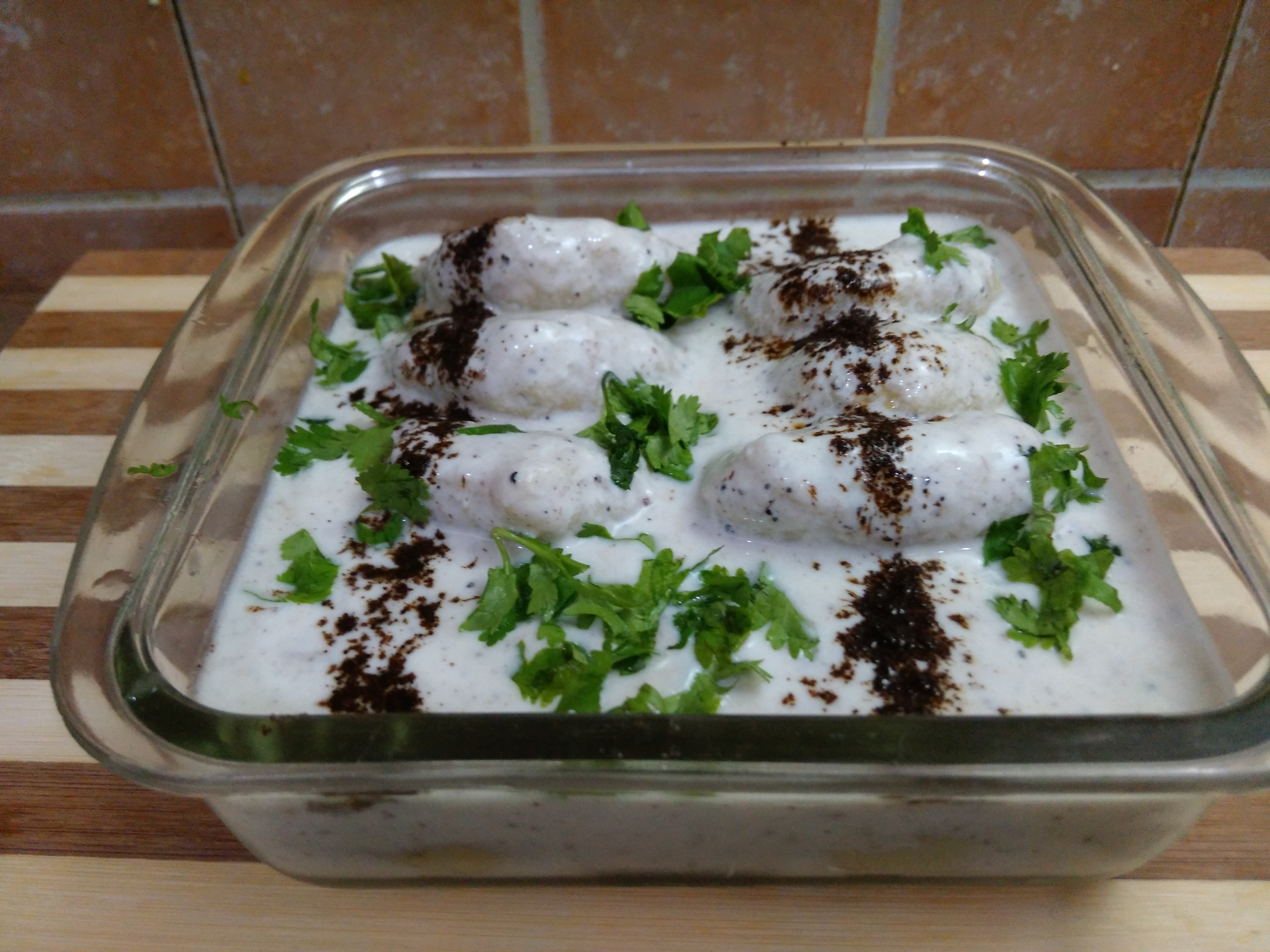

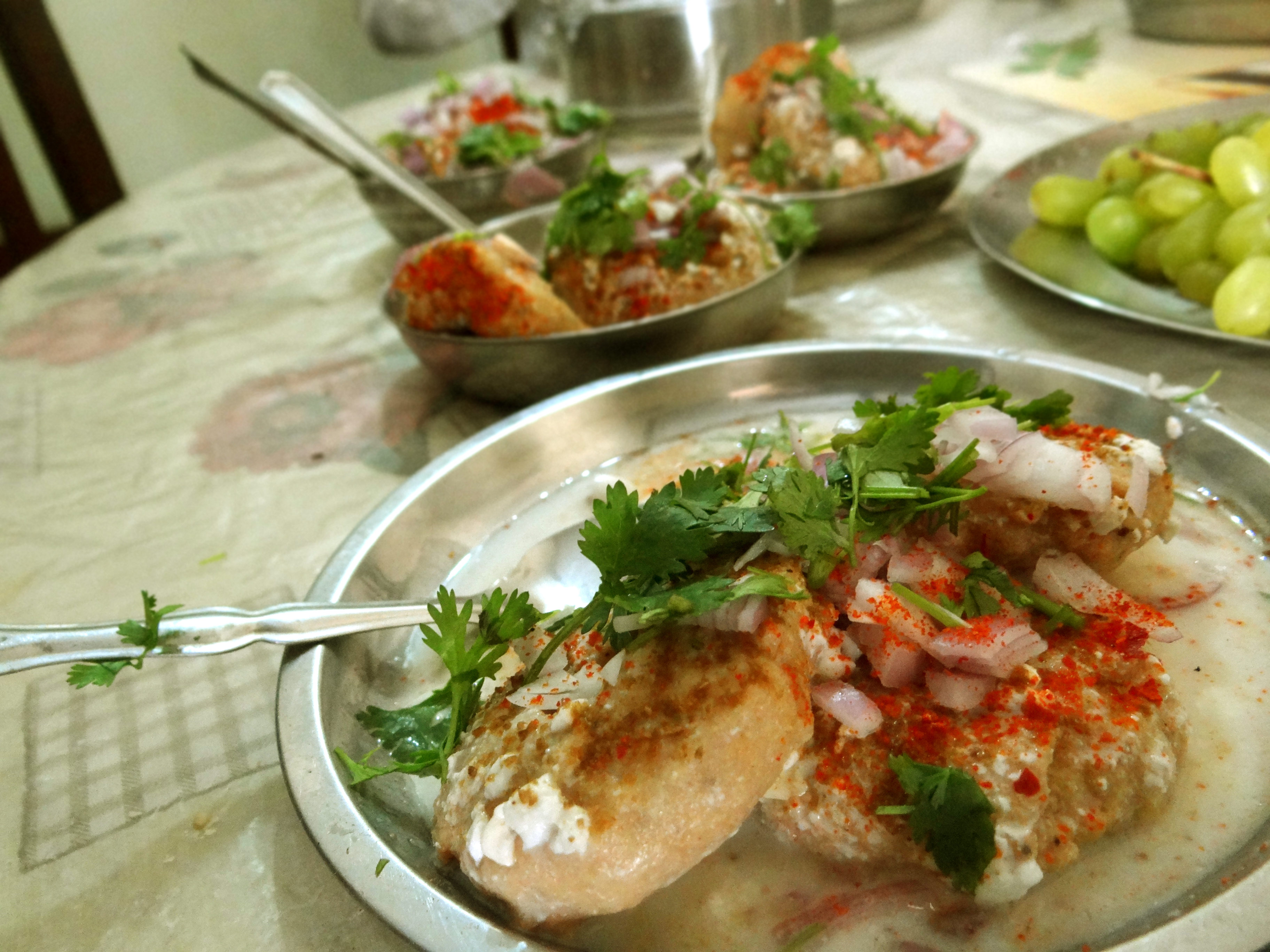

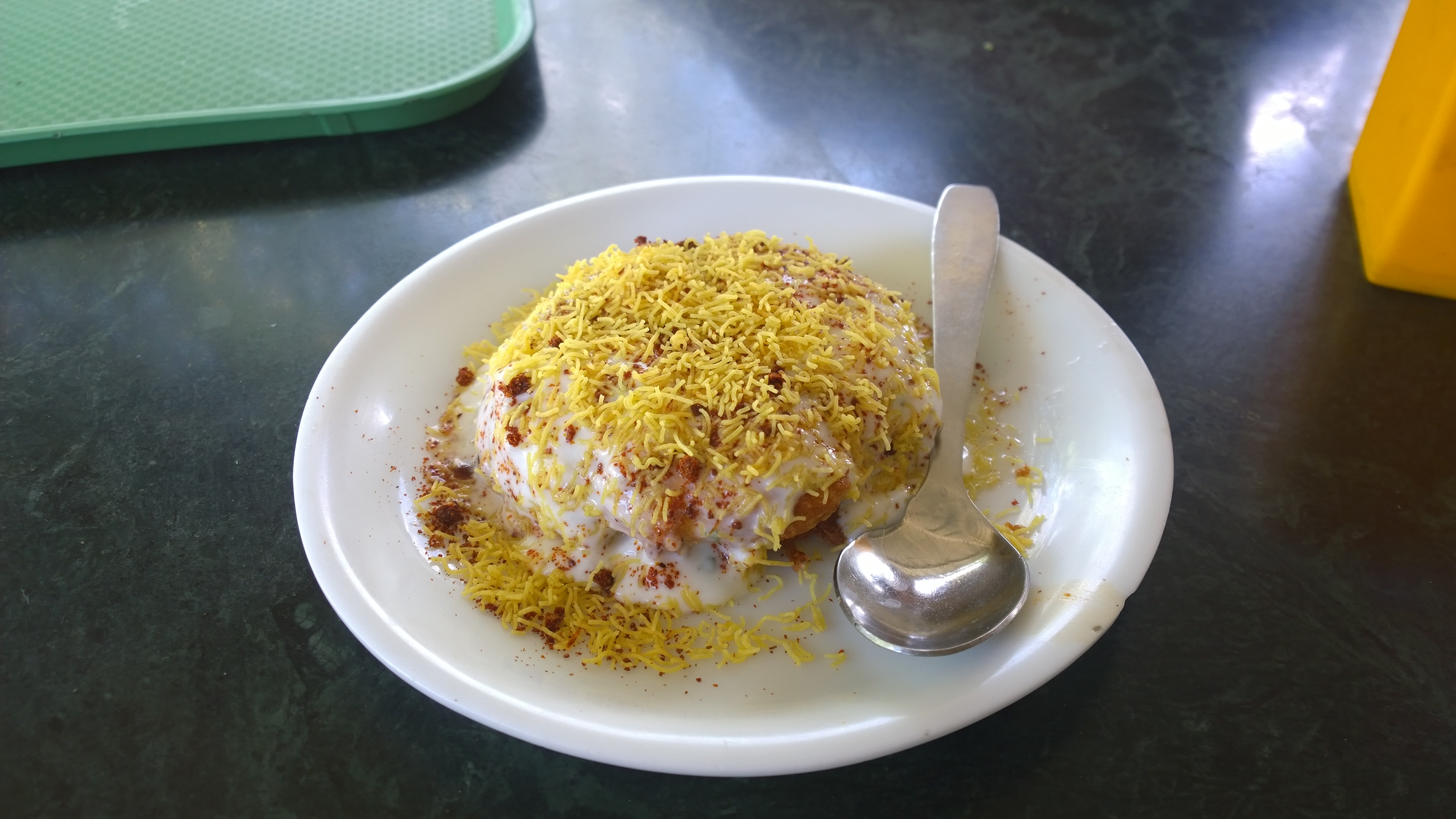

== Locations ==
Dahi vada as popular street chaat is found in various cities across India, including Chennai, Bangaluru, Delhi, Mumbai, Hyderabad, Jaipur, Kolkata, Kochi, Cuttack, and Indore. Dahi baray are also found in Pakistan, especially in Karachi.

== See also ==
- Dahi puri
- Dahibara Aludam
- Joshpara
- Punjabi cuisine
