= Culture of Maharashtra =

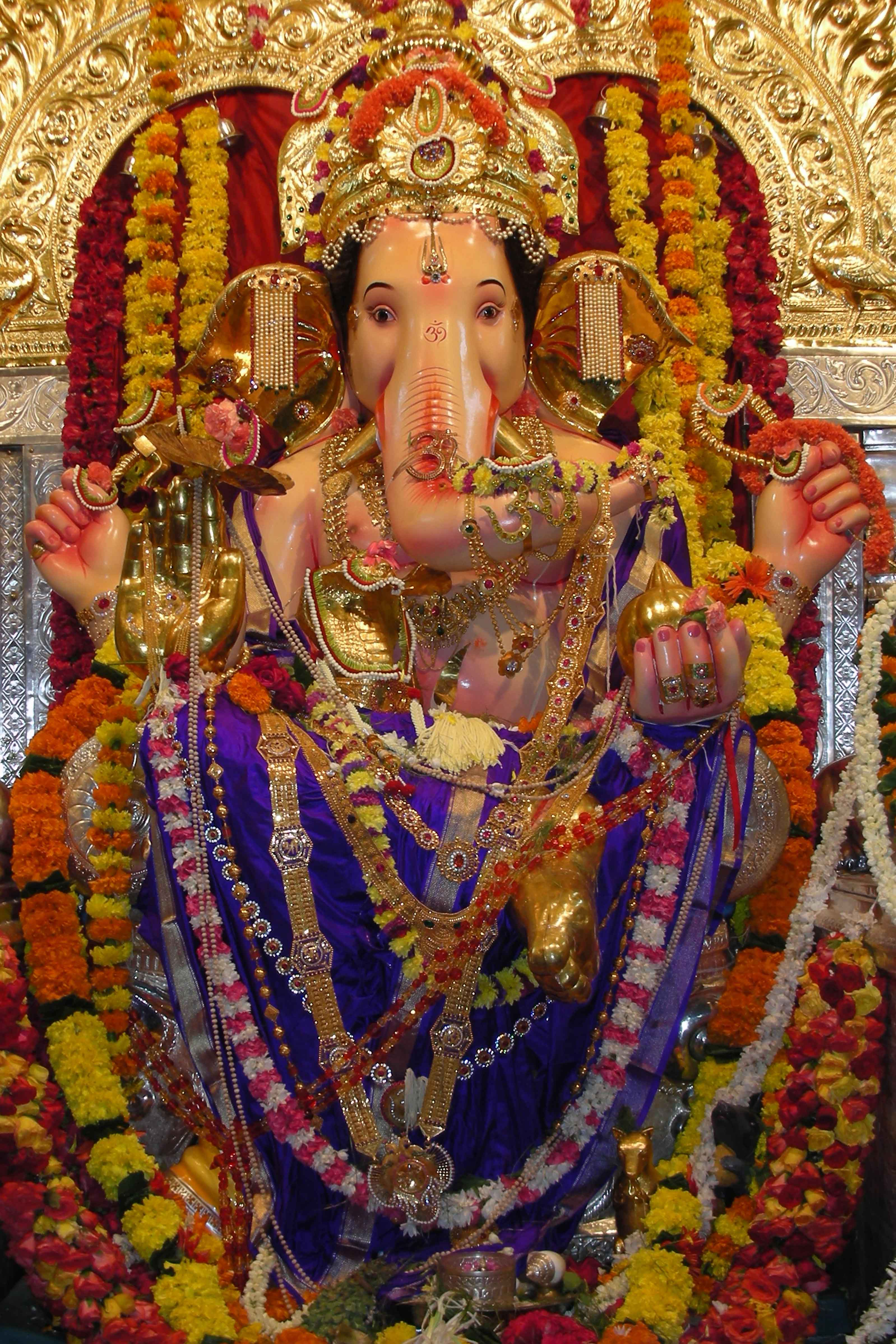
Ganesh Chaturthi, a popular festival in the state

Maharashtra is the third largest state of India in terms of land area and second largest in terms of population in India. It has a long history of Marathi saints of Varakari religious movement, such as Dnyaneshwar, Namdev, Chokhamela, Eknath and Tukaram which form the one of bases of the culture of Maharashtra or Marathi culture. Maharashtrian culture had large influence over neighbouring regions under the Maratha Empire.

The state of Maharashtra spans multiple cultures which includes cultures related to Hindus, Muslims, Buddhists, Sikhs, Christians, etc. Lord Ganesha, Maruti, Mahadeo in form of Shivlinga, Khandoba, Kalubai devi, and Lord Vitthal are some of the deities worshipped by Hindus of Maharashtra.

Maharashtra is divided into 5 regions: Konkan, Paschim Maharashtra, North Maharashtra, Marathwada, Vidarbha. Each has its own cultural identity in the form of different dialects of Marathi language, folk songs, food, dress and ethnicity.

== Overview ==
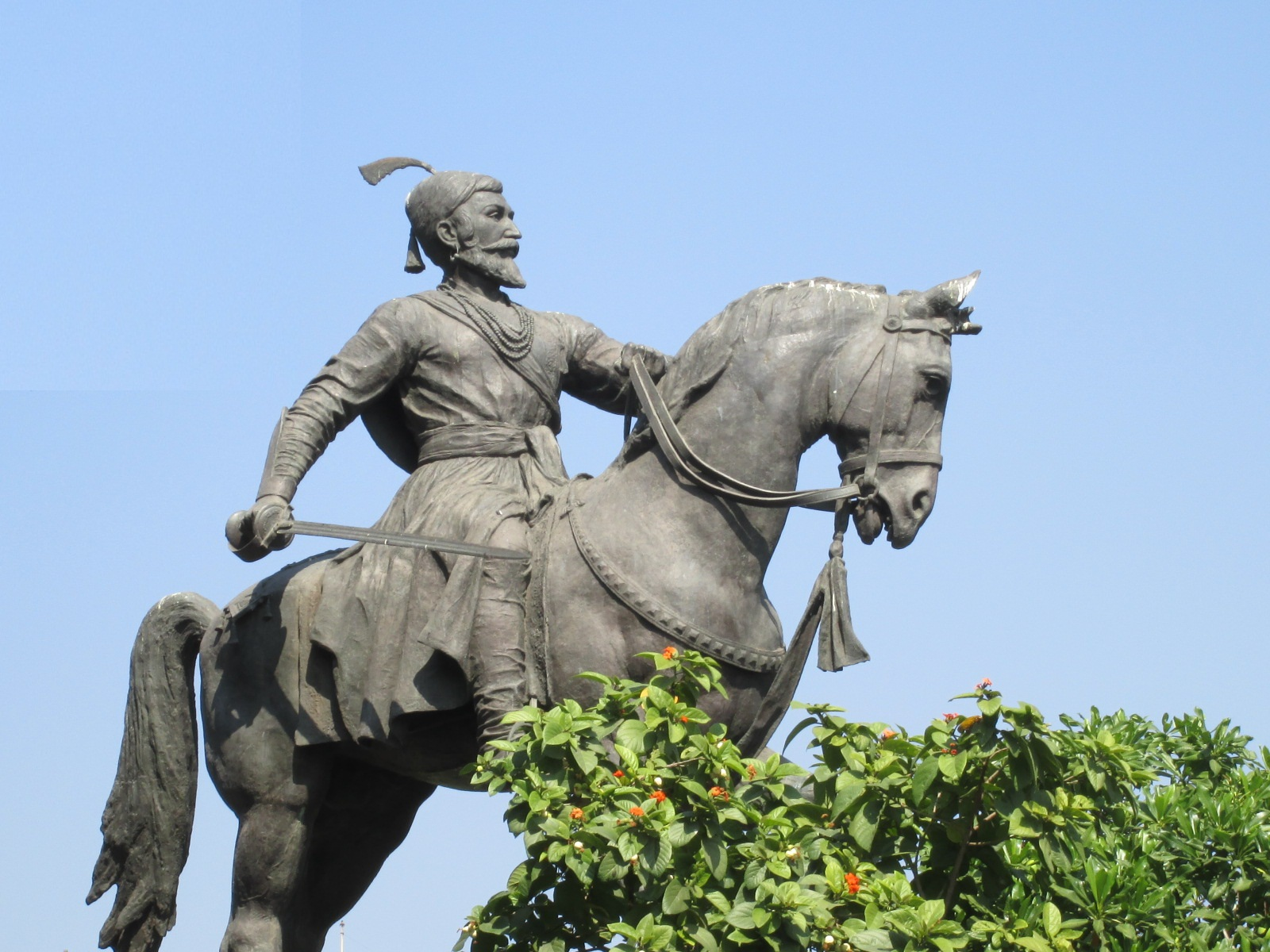
Statue of Shivaji opposite to Gateway of India in North Mumbai

Around 80% of Maharashtrians are Hindu, and there are significant Muslim, Christian and Buddhist minorities. The Maharashtrian culture consists of people from all a vast majority of religions. Due to it being huge areawise, many sub-regional cultures also exist in Maharashtra. The sub region of Vidarbha, was earlier a part of Central Provinces and Berar, hence it has that influence upon its culture. There are many temples in Maharashtra, some of which are thousands of years old. These temples are constructed in a fusion of architectural styles borrowed from North and South India. The temples also blend themes from Hindu, Buddhist and Jain cultures. The temple of Lord Vitthal at Pandharpur is the most important temple for the Varkari sect. Other important religious places are the Ashtavinayaka temples of Lord Ganesha, Bhimashankar which is one of the Jyotirling (12 important Lord Shiva temples).

Near Aurangabad are UNESCO World Heritage Sites and famous tourist attractions. Mughal architecture can be seen in the tomb of the wife of Aurangzeb called Bibi Ka Maqbara located at Aurangabad. Mumbai is the capital of Maharashtra and has humid climate throughout the year. The Gateway of India, Chhatrapati Shivaji Maharaj Terminus, Shaniwar Wada, Aga Khan Palace, and Deekshabhoomi are some of the historical monuments.

Maharashtra has a large number of hill, land and sea forts. Forts have played an important role in the history of Maharashtra since the time of the Chhatrapati Shivaji Maharaj. Some of the important forts in Maharashtra are Shivneri, Raigad, Vijaydurg, Pratapgad, Sinhagad. The majority of the forts in Maharashtra are found along the coastal region of Konkan and the adjoining Sahyadri ranges.

== Religions, castes and sects ==
=== Religion ===
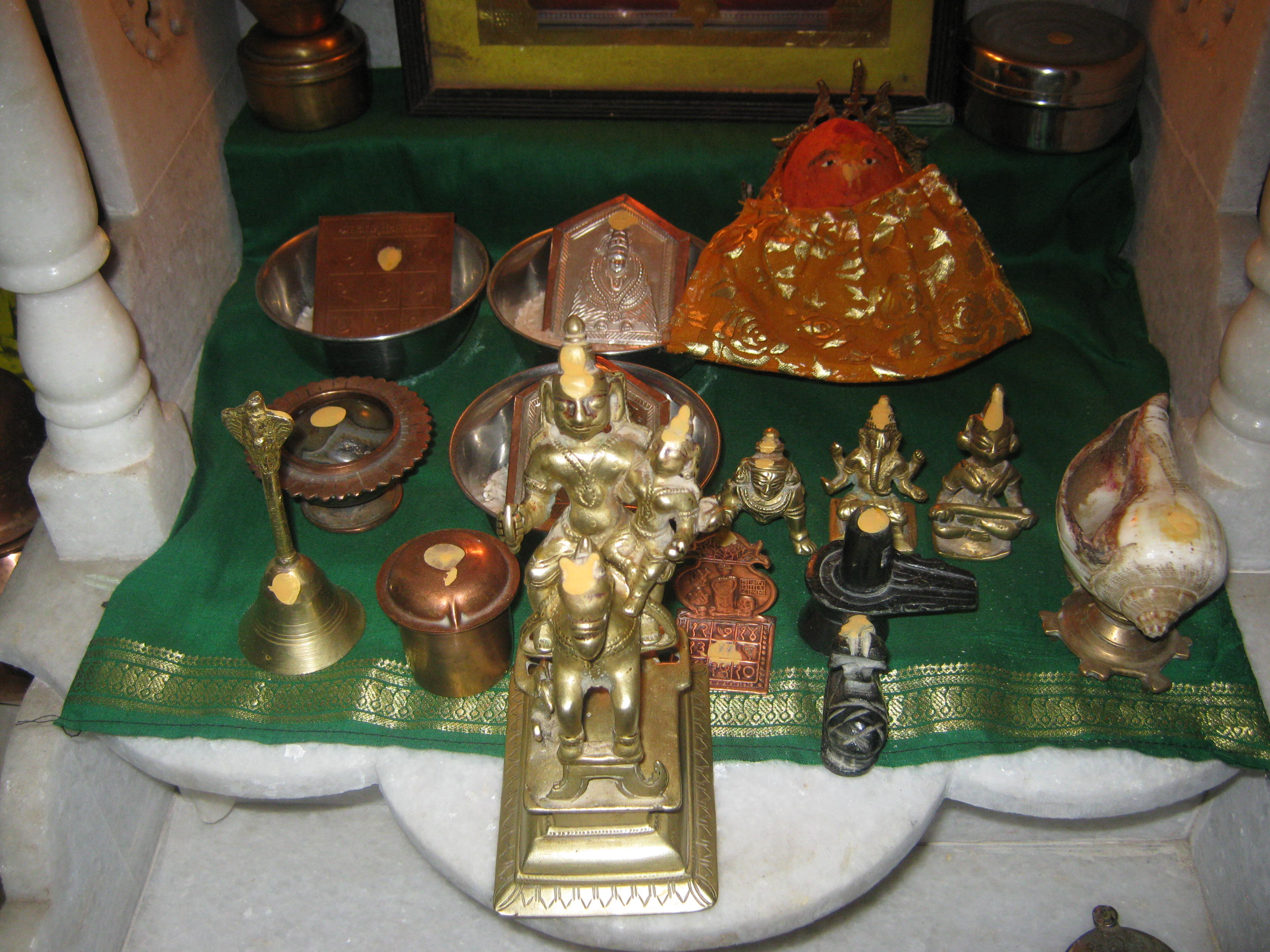
Household shrine in a Maharashtrian Hindu home

Marathi Hindus revere many religious figures. Among the figures who originated in the region are Banka Mahar, Bhagu, Damajipanth, Kanhopatra, Karmamelam, Nirmala, Sadna, Sakhubai, Satyakam Jabali and Soyarabai.

According to the 2011 census, Hinduism was the principal religion in the state at 79.83% of the total population, while Muslims constituted 11.54% of the total population. Maharashtra has India's largest Buddhist and Jain populations. Buddhism accounted for 6% in Maharashtra's total population, with 6.53 million followers, which is 77% of all Buddhists in India. Jains, Christians and Sikhs constituted 1.2%, 1.0%, 0.2% of the population respectively.

=== Caste ===
The traditional caste hierarchy was headed by the Brahmin castes-the Chitpavans, Karhades, Deshasthas and the Saraswats. In Mumbai during British rule, this included the Devrukha and Daivadnyna Brahmin communities. The Marathas are 32% in Western Maharashtra and the Kunbis were 7%, whereas the Other Backward Class population (other than the Kunbi) was 27%. The population of the Mahars was 8%. The high castes of ambiguous "settled migrant" status include: Chandraseniya Kayastha Prabhus, Rajputs, Pathare Prabhus and Charans and Kayastha groups who migrated centuries ago to Maharashtra from northern India - and settled in north Maharashtra and regions surrounding Bombay and Daman.

== Attire ==
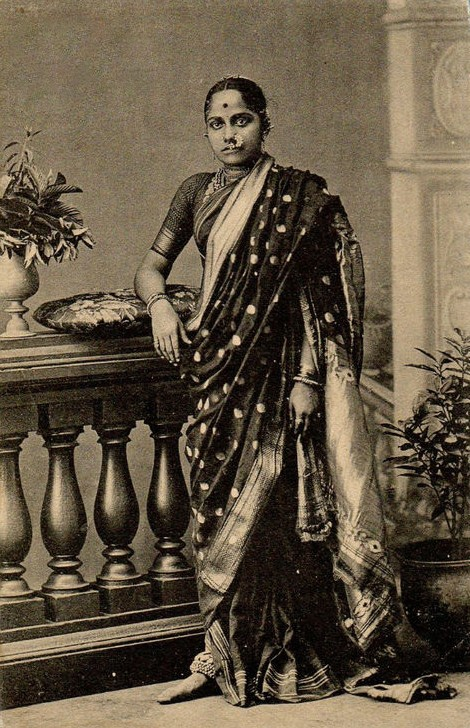
A Maharashtrian woman in traditional attire (Navwari)

Traditional attire in Maharashtra includes the dhoti, and pheta for men, while a choli and nine-yard saree locally known as Navwri saree for women. Traditional attire is becoming rarer with trousers and shirts for males and five yard saree or salwar kameez for females as the popular replacements. The traditional attire is increasingly worn by Maharashtrians only during special occasions and festivals. Marathi women also wear gajra or veni made by flowers on their sarees. Maharashtra also has rich Jewellery. Jewellery such as tanmani, bormal, Ranihar, kolhapuri saaj, thushi are worn on the neck; bajuband on area of hand above elbow; painjan wore on ankles; kudi, bugdi, vajra kutka, vel, Bali on ears; Marathi nath on nose; jodave on toes.

== Cuisine ==
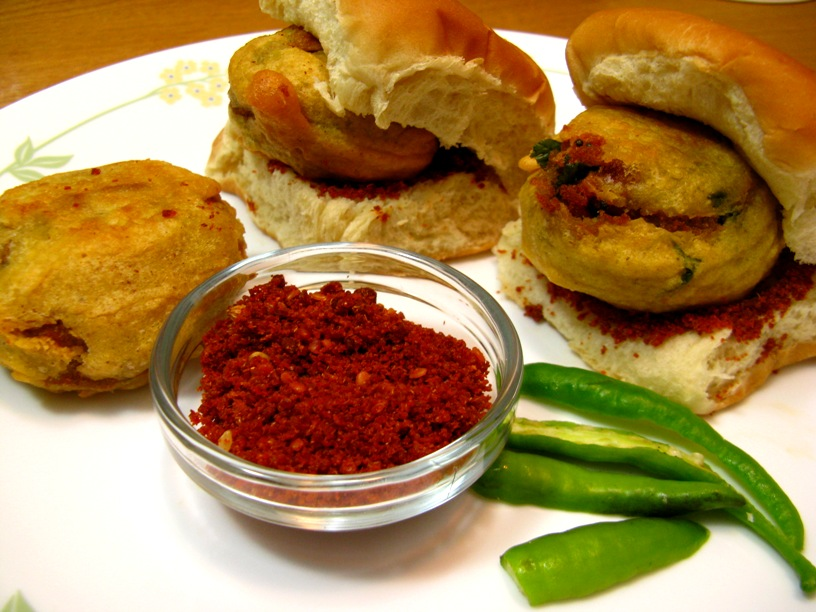
Vada Pav is one of the popular modern snack foods of Maharashtra.

Maharashtrian cuisine has distinctive attributes, while sharing much with other Indian cuisines. Traditionally, Maharashtrians have considered their food to be more austere than others. Maharashtrian cuisine includes mild and very spicy dishes.

A typical Maharashtrian meal consists of boiled rice, bhakri or poli along with varan, aamti and cooked lentils or a spiced vegetable. Bhakri is an integral part of Maharashtrian cuisine. Bhakri is a flame roasted bucolic bread made of flour of grains like pearl millet, rice, sorghum, amaranth and many others. Unlike other types of breads like chapatis which are flattened by Rolling pin, Bhakri is flattened by hands.

Batata vada, Vada pav, Puran poli, Ukdiche modak, Sabudana khichdi, Pav-bhaji and Masala Bhat are some of the popular vegetarian dishes served throughout Maharashtra.

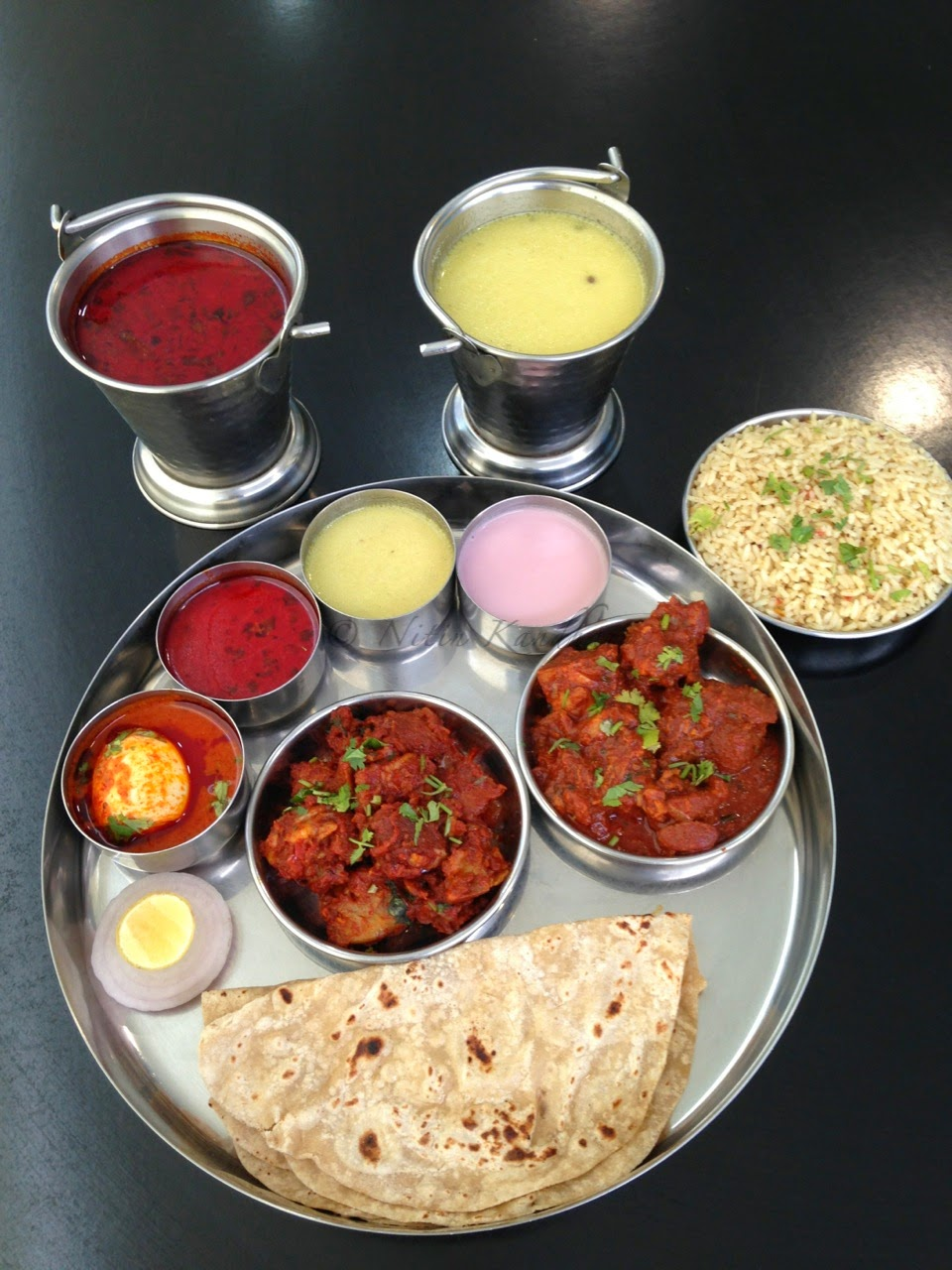
Mutton thali with Tambda and Pandhra rassa. A famous non-vegetarian dish originated from Kolhapur.

Non-vegetarian food consists of dishes mostly made of fish, chicken and mutton. Some of the popular non-vegetarian dishes include Sukka mutton, pandhra rassa, and tabmda rassa, which are originated from Kolhapur and saoji mutton which is popular in vidarbha.

The cuisine of Maharashtra can be divided into two major sections the coastal and the interior. Kokan, the coastal region of Maharashtra has its own type of cuisine which is a combination of dishes influenced by Malvani, Goud Saraswat Brahmin and Goan cuisine

Distinctly Maharashtrian dishes include pitla, bhakri, bharleli vangi, ukdiche modak, aluchi patal bhaji, thalipeeth, pav bhaji, Puran Poli, shrikhand, basundi, vada pav, nashik chi misal pav, and Mumbai chaat. Puneri missal, nagpuri, sambar vada, and selucha chanaare also considered to have originated from Maharashtra.

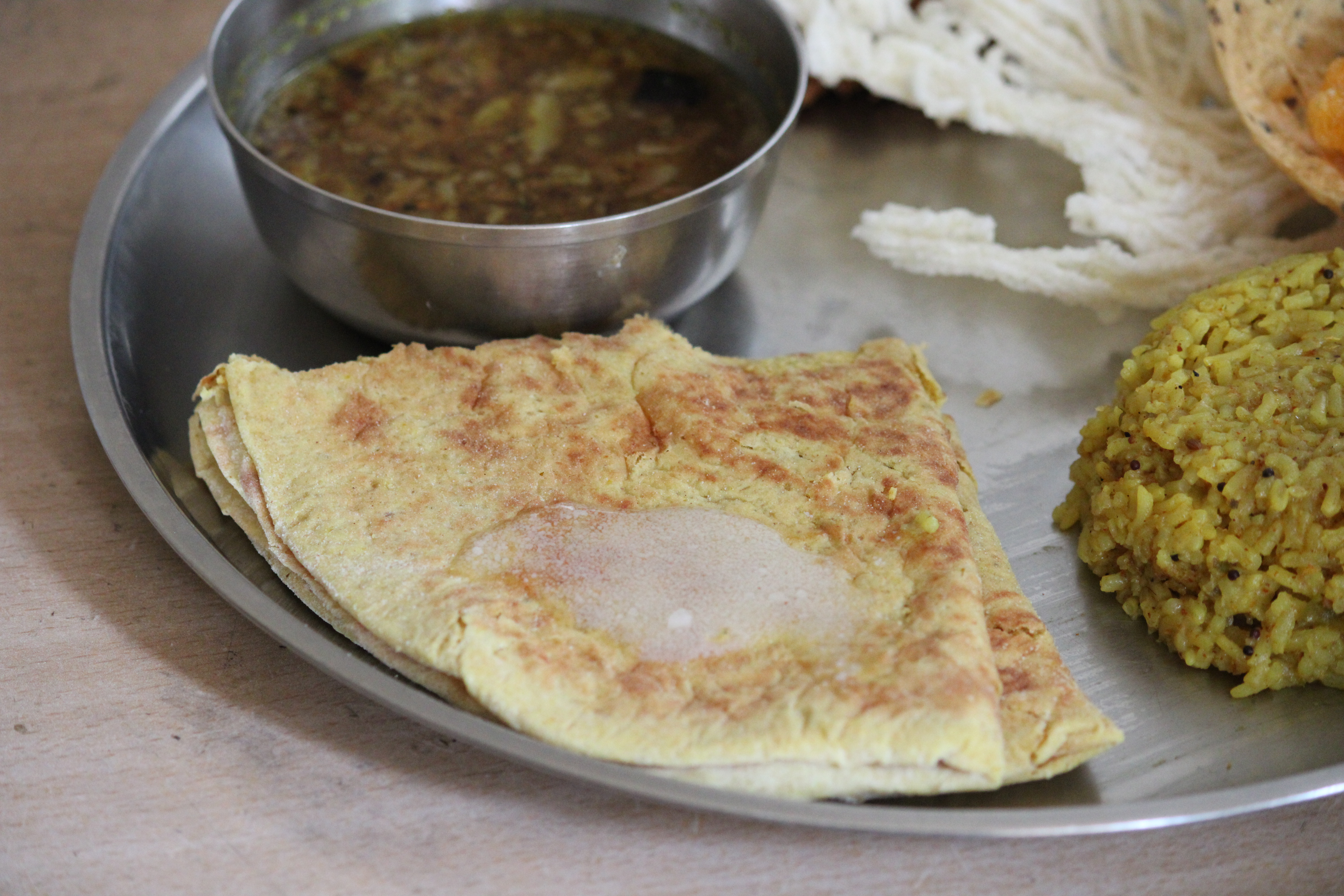
puran poli, one of the most popular sweet item in Maharashtra

The Konkan, Varadi, Agri and khandeshi cuisines are popular with tourists. The specialty dishes of Maharashtran cuisines are often strong in pepper and spice with a twist of curry leaves, coconut and peanuts; well-known dishes include vada pav, misal pav and Mumbai chaat and puneri missal, selucha chana.

Typical breakfast items include misal, pohe, upma, sheera, sabudana khichadi and thalipeeth. In some households leftover rice from the previous night is fried with onions, turmeric and mustard seeds for breakfast, making phodnicha bhat. Typical Western breakfast items such as cereals, sliced bread and eggs, as well as South Indian items such as idli and dosa are also popular. Tea or coffee is served with breakfast.

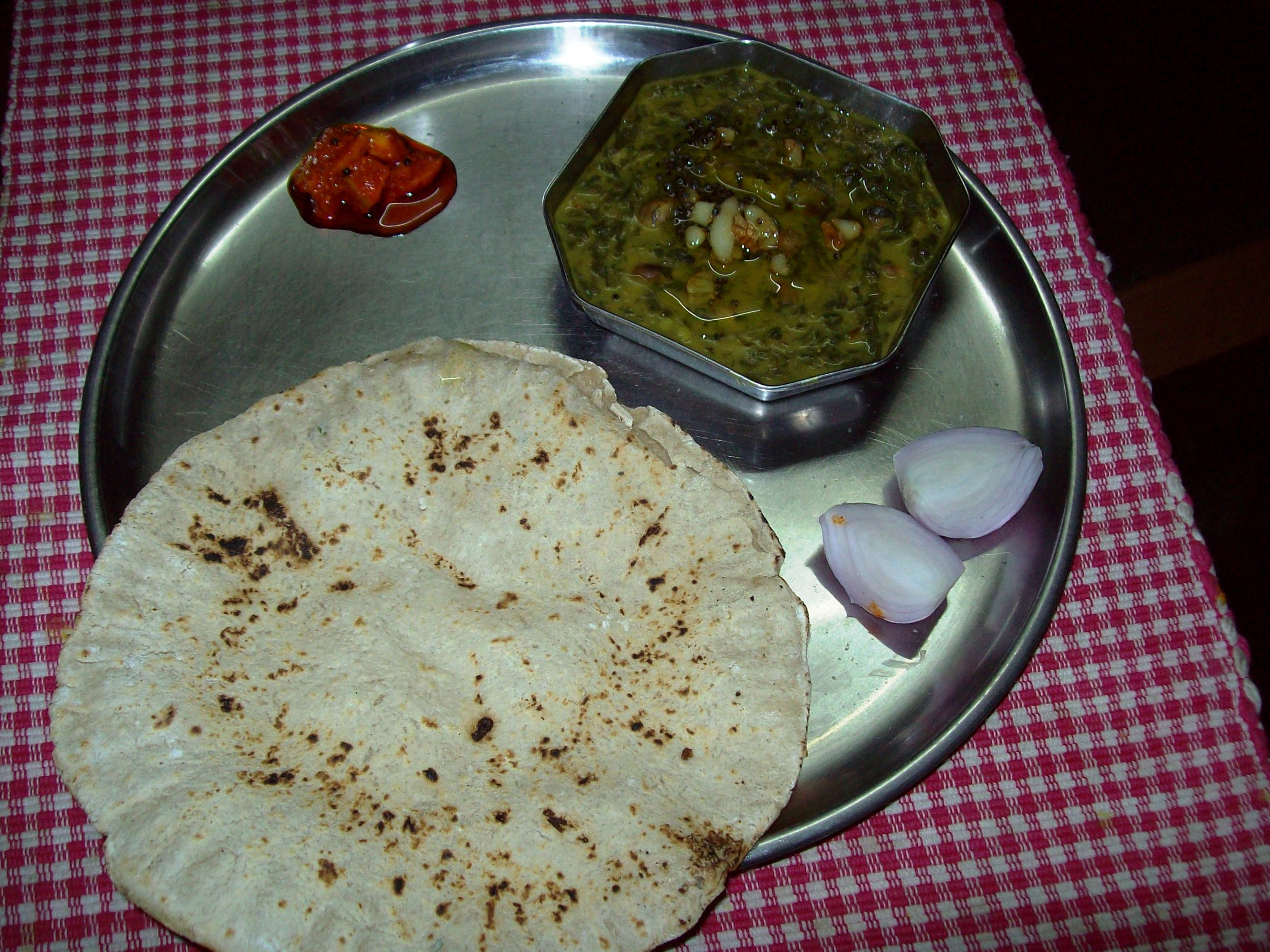
A typical Maharashtrian meal with bhaaji, bhakari, raw onion and pickle

=== Urban lunch and dinner menus ===
A Maharashtrian vegetarian meal with a variety of items Vegetarian lunch and dinner plates in urban areas carry a combination of:

- Wheat flatbread such as round chapati or ghadichi poli (layered triangular chapati)
- Boiled rice
- Salad or koshimbir based on onions, tomatoes or cucumber
- Papad or related snacks such as sandge, kurdaya and sabudana papdya
- Dry or fresh chutney, mango or lemon pickles
- Aamti or varan soup based on toor dal, other dals or kadhi. When usal is part of the menu, the aamti may be omitted.
- Vegetables with gravy based on seasonal availability such as egg plants, okra, potatoes, or cauliflower
- Dry leafy vegetables such as spinach
- Usal based on sprouted or unsprouted whole legumes

Apart from bread, rice, and chutney, other items may be substituted. Families that eat meat, fish and poultry may combine vegetarian and non-vegetarian dishes, with rice and chapatis remaining the staples. Vegetable or non-vegetable items are essentially dips for the bread or for mixing with rice.

Traditional dinner items are arranged in a circular way. With salt placed at 12 o'clock, pickles, koshimbir and condiments are placed anti-clockwise of the salt. Vegetable preparations are arranged in a clockwise fashion with a sequence of leafy greens curry, dry vegetables, sprouted been curry (usal ) and dal. Rice is always on the periphery rather than in the center.

=== Rural lunch and dinner menus ===
A typical Maharashtrian meal consists of bhaaji, bhakari, raw onion and pickle. In the Konkan coastal area a typical meal consists of boiled rice, bhakri made of rice or nachani flour and a vegetable.

In other areas of Maharashtra such as Desh, Khandesh, Marathwada and Vidarbha, the traditional staple was bhakri with a combination of dal, and vegetables. The bhakri is increasingly replaced by wheat-based chapatis.

== Fairs and festivals ==
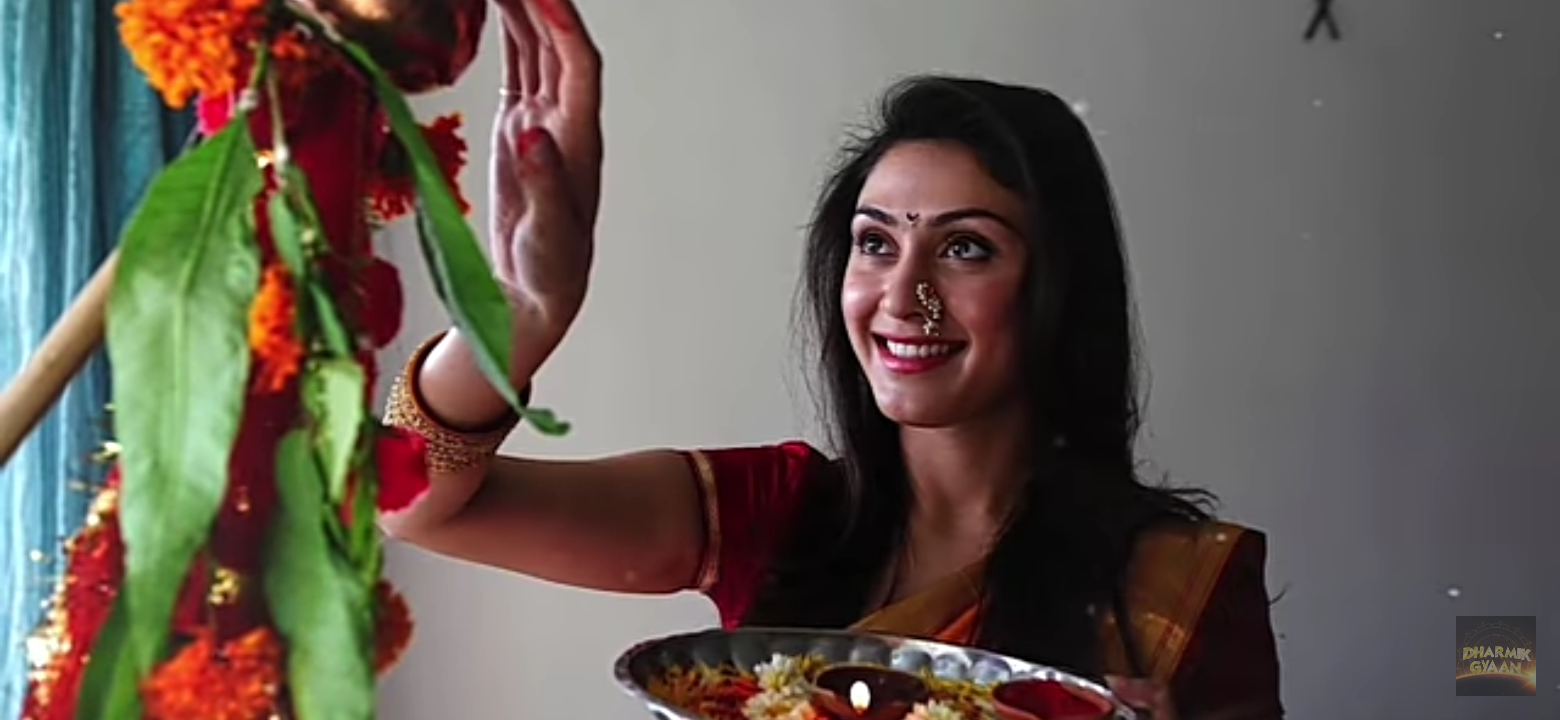
Gudhi Padwa is one of the most important festival of Maharashtra

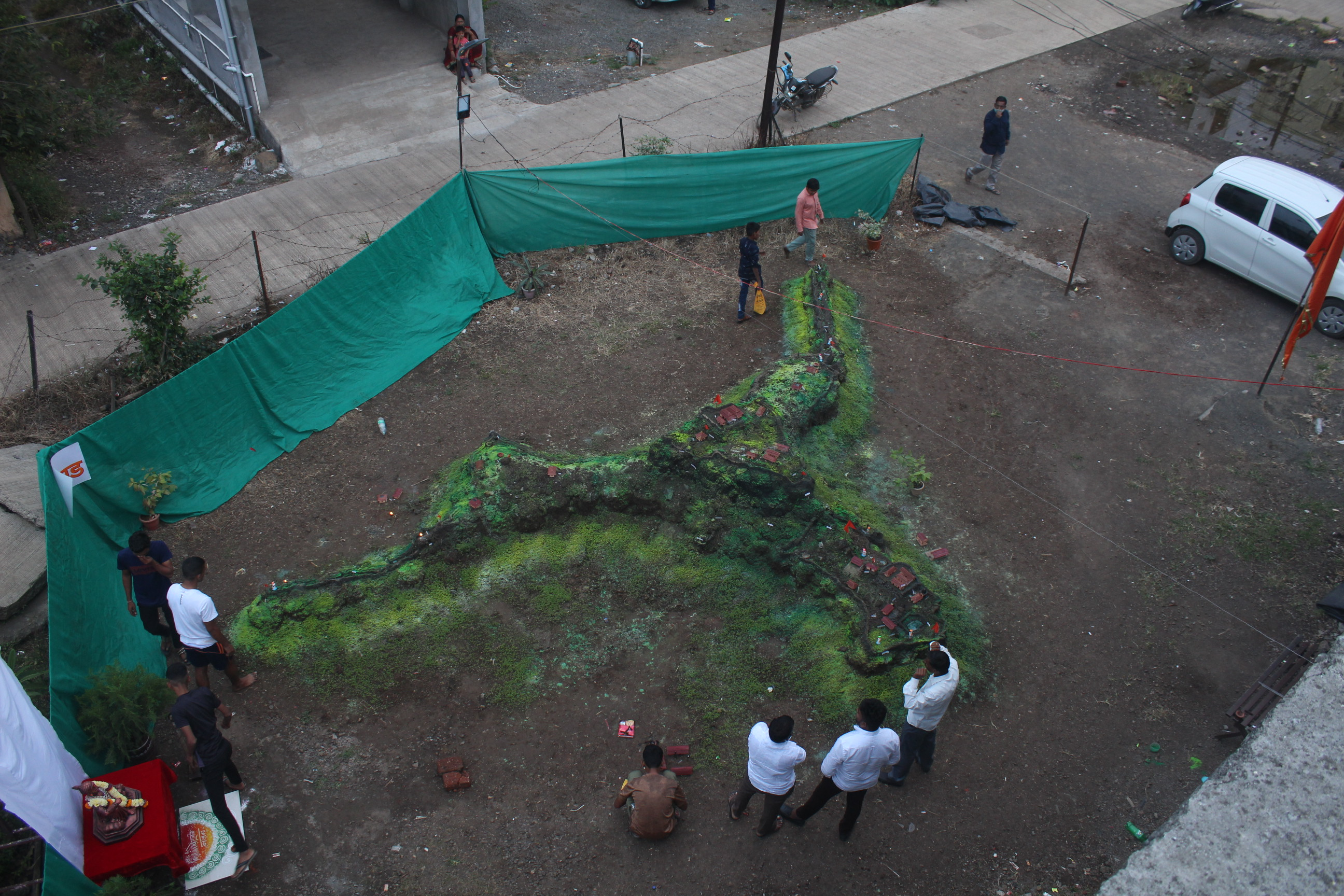
A Killa (fort) built by kids on the occasion of Diwali as a tribute to Chatrapati Shivaji Maharaj, a long-standing tradition in Maharashtra.

Gudhi Padwa is celebrated as the first day of the Hindu year. Gudhi is symbol-characterized by bamboo stick with a coloured silk cloth and garlanded with flowers and sweet a top. Ganesh Chaturthi is the most important festival in Maharashtra. It is celebrated for ten days with huge fun fare.

Banganga Festival, Bhaubeej, Elephanta Festival, Ellora Festival, Ganga Dashahara, Jivti Puja, Kalidas Festival, Kojagiri Pournima, Maharashtra Day, Naga Panchami, Narali Pournima, Pola, Shiv Jayanti and Vat Pournima are some of the important festivals of Maharashtra.

In Diwali, kids build a replica of a fort, known locally as 'Killa', as a tribute to Great Maratha King chatrapati Shivaji maharaj . They are made of mud and rocks and decked with mustard shoots, mavalas or toy soldiers, toy cannons and miniature animals.

== Sport ==
Sports is an important part of the culture of Maharashtra. Cricket, Kabaddi, hockey, kho kho, badminton, and table tennis are popular sports in the state. The wrestling championship like Hind Kesari, Maharashtra Kesari are very popular in the rural regions of Maharashtra. Cricket is the most widely followed and played sport in the state. Maharashtra has produced many Iconic cricketers of India, such as Sachin Tendulkar and Sunil Gavaskar.Horse riding, wrestling, fencing, archery, and shooting were popular among the former rulers of Maharashtra. Maharashtra has various domestic-level, franchise-based leagues for hockey, chess, tennis, and badminton. Viti-dandu, and marbles were traditional children's games in the past in Maharashtra. These games have been revived and organized at the district level. The Sporting activities in Maharashtra are governed by the Commissioner of Sports and Youth Services, Pune.

== Performing arts ==
=== Music ===
Lavani, Powada and Tamasha are the most popular folk songs in Maharashtra. Bhaleri, a folk song is sung by the farmers in Maharashtra. Village women of Maharashtra sing a folk song called Owi describing husband's home. It is generally sung by women while grinding grains on jaata(जातं).Suvasinis sing folk songs at the halad ceremonies in a marriage. Palane/Angai geet is a lullaby in Maharashtra.

Bhajan, Bharud, Gondhal, Kirtan, Lalita, Abhangas and Tumbadi singing are the other forms of community entertainment based on folk songs found in Maharashtra.

Vasudev is a folk artist who walks from house to house in the morning while singing different Abhangas in the villages of Maharashtra and begs for food and gives blessings. The tradition of Vasudeva in Marathi culture is estimated to be around one thousand-twelve hundred years old.

=== Dance ===
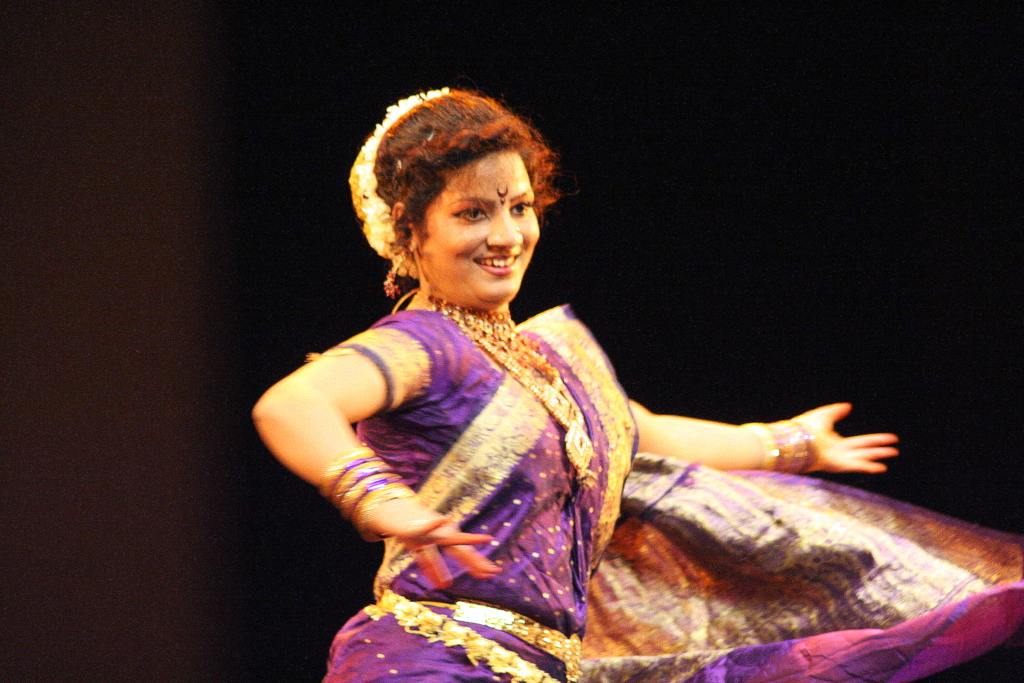
Lavani, a traditional dance of Maharashtra

The folk music and dances of Maharashtra are Koli, Powada, Banjara Holi and Lavani dance. Lavani dance form showcases many topics such as romance, tragedy, politics, society, etc. The word 'Lavani' derived from Marathi word Lavanya meaning beautiful and beauty. Powada dance form shows achievements of Shivaji. Koli dance originated from Fishermen community of Maharashtra. Other dances such as lavani, tamasha, dindi and kala, dhangari gaja, lezim, and different folk dances are also performed.

=== Theatre ===
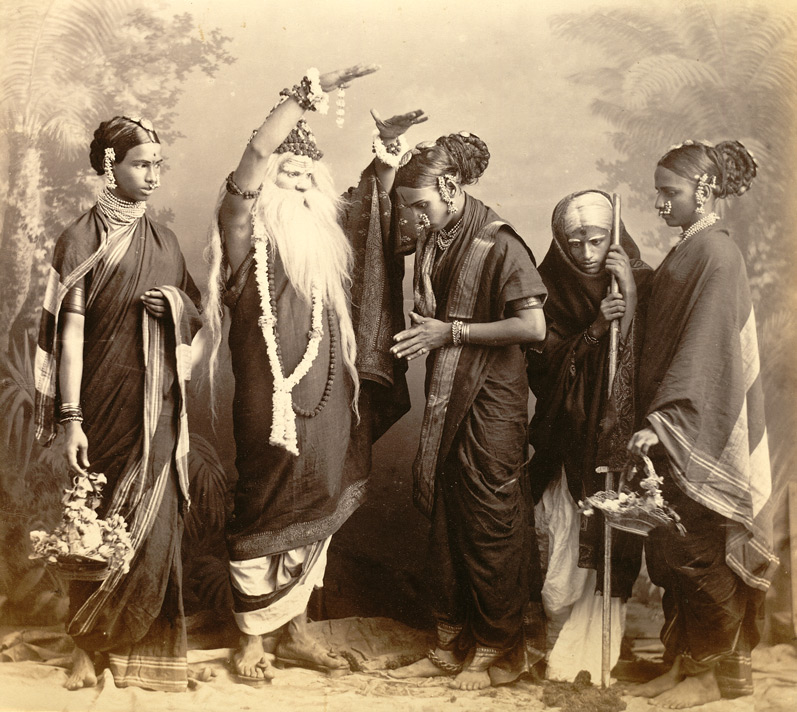
A Marathi theatrical group, Mumbai, 1870.

It was starting in the middle of the 19th century, it flourished in the 1950s and 1960s, and includes forms like Sangeet Natak (Musical drama) and Tamasha (folk dance). Today, it continues to have a marked presence in the State of Maharashtra with a loyal audience base, when most theatres in other parts of India have had a tough time facing the onslaught of cinema and television. Its repertoire ranges from humorous social plays, farces, historical plays, musical, to experimental plays and serious drama of the 1970s onwards, by Vijay Tendulkar, P. L. Deshpande, Mahesh Elkunchwar and Satish Alekar, which have influenced theatre throughout India. In the post-independence era, Bengali theatre, and Marathi theatre have been at the forefront of innovations and significant dramaturgy in Indian theatre.

=== Cinema ===
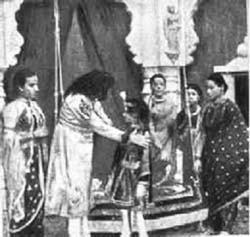
Raja Harishchandra

Marathi cinema is the oldest form of Indian cinema. The first Marathi movie released in India was Shree Pundalik by Dadasaheb Torne on 18 May 1912 at Coronation Cinematograph, Mumbai.

Dadasaheb Phalke is known as the first pioneer and founder of cinema in pre-Independence India. He brought the revolution of moving images to India with his first indigenously made film Raja Harishchandra in 1913, which is considered by IFFI and NIFD as part of Marathi cinema as it used Marathi dialogues while shooting and had a fully Marathi crew.

== See also ==
- Sangeet Natak
- Sports in Maharashtra
- Maharashtrian cuisine
- Marathi cinema
