= Indian fast food =

Fast food industry in India

The fast food industry in India has evolved with the changing lifestyles of the young Indian population. The variety of gastronomic preferences across the regions, hereditary or acquired, has brought about different modules across the country.

Many of the traditional dishes have been adapted to suit the emerging fast food outlets. The basic adaptation is to decrease the processing and serving time. For example, the typical meal which called for being served by an ever-alert attendant is now offered as a Mini-Meal across the counter. In its traditional version, a plate or a banana leaf was first laid down on the floor or table. Several helpers then waited on the diner, doling out different dishes and refilling as they got over in the plate.

== Styles ==
It is common to serve different cuisines at different counters within the same premises. Beverages such coffee, tea, soft drinks and fruit juices may also be served in such outlets. Some outlets may additionally have specially designed counters for ice-cream, chaats etc.

Popular formats of fast food business in India have the following features in common:

- Wide opening on the roadside
- Easy to maintain and durable décor
- A cash counter where food coupons are sold
- A food delivery counter which invariably is granite topped
- Additional counters for Ice Creams, Chaats, Beverages etc.
- A well fitted kitchen located so as to be visible to the customers
- Tall tables, typically of stainless steel, where one can eat while standing
- A drinking water fountain adorned with a water filter
- Rust-proof and non-breakable crockery

Most of the fast food outlets in India are stand alone establishment, few of them having more than one branch.

== Food courts ==
Another concept of fast food that is becoming popular is that of Food Courts. Here also one has to purchase coupons and collect the food from one of the several counters. Each one of these counters serves specific variety of food and may be owned by different individuals or caterers. Food Courts are normally located on much bigger premises and may provide seating facility in addition to the stand and eat arrangement. Typically one entrepreneur owns or takes on lease the entire premises and promotes the place under one name. They then let out individual counters to different independent operators to offer different menu. Internal competition is avoided by not allowing more than one counter to offer similar food.

Several international fast-food chains like Kentucky Fried Chicken, McDonald's, and Taco Bell have their outlets in major cities. Some Indian chains with outlets across India include Barista Coffee and Café Coffee Day.

Now local chains coupled with numerous foreign fast foods have appeared in India.

== Varieties of food offered ==
Some of the popular dishes offered at Indian fast food outlets are:

=== Western Indian ===
- Vada pav – a deep-fried potato (vada) sandwiched in a bread bun (pav)
- Misal pav – cooked sprouted lentils and farsan in a spicy gravy
- Pav bhaji – a thick vegetable curry (bhaji) served with a soft bread roll (pav)
- Khaman – a Gujarati snack that is made from fresh daal or gram flour
- Samosa – a fried or baked pastry with a savory filling, including ingredients such as spiced potatoes, onions, and peas
- Usal – a Maharastrian dish made of legumes such as peas, lentils, black-eyed beans, Matki, Moong, or Hyacinth beans
- Khandvi
- Gathiya – Bhavanagar gathiya, Gathiya
- Jalebi – Kesar jalebi, Desi ghee jalebi
- Poha – Masa Poha, Kanda poha, Usal poha
- Puff – Masala Puff, Cheese Puff
- Shahi tukda – A bread pudding sweet

=== South Indian ===
- Idli – Rice Idli, Rava Idli
- Vada – Uddina Vada, Rava Vada, Masala Vada, Maddur Vada
- Dosa - Masala Dosa, Set Dosa, Rava Dosa
- Upma, Kesaribhath
- Puliyogare
- Pongal
- Vangibath
- Vegetable Bonda
- Chaat
- Poori

=== Others ===
- Bonda Soup
- Pohay
- Bhajji – Banana Bhajji, Green Chili Bhajji
- Pakora – Onion Pakora, Vegetable Pakora
- Thali - vegetable, chicken, mutton
- Rajma rice
- Indian Chinese cuisine
- Pasta
- Burger (chicken, mutton, veg)
- Wraps and rolls
- Chaat
- Grilled chicken
- Samosa, patties(E.g. Ragda pattice), bread pakoda
- Dabeli
- Doner kebab
- Dum biryani
- Fish and chips
- Salads
- Fruit beer
- Mutar kulcha
- Pao bhaji
- Stuffed paratha
- Fruit salad
- Idli sambar
- Vada sambar
- Dahi wada
- Bhajiya
- Mini Meals
- Chapati and sabji
- koalcha
- Momos

=== Beverages ===
- Coffee
- Tea
- Lassi
- Fruit punch
- Cold Drinks
- Fresh fruit juice
- Milkshake
- Mocktails
- Sugarcane juice
- Soup (Hot Beverage)

== Public perception and food hygiene ==
Indian street food is known for its variety and low prices, but hygiene at street stalls has raised concerns. The Food Safety and Standards Authority of India (FSSAI) has introduced programmes to improve cleanliness and food handling among street vendors.

Videos and images shared on social media have also drawn attention to the issue. Some show food being prepared in extremely dirty conditions such as shown below.

A false unsanitairy AI depiction of Indian street food

Not all of the footage is genuine. In June 2026, Lead Stories reported on AI-generated videos that appeared to show Indian street vendors handling food in unsanitary ways.
