= Puneri =

The word Puneri means "relating to the Indian city of Pune".

- Puneri or Punekar, a term used to refer to the residents of Pune.
- Puneri Pagadi: a style of turban, considered a symbol of pride and honour in the town of Pune (Maharashtra).
- Puneri Misal, a kind of misal (food) or a show on Saam TV.

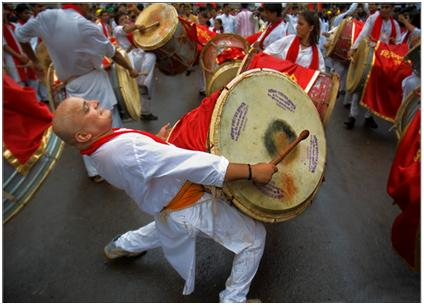
The traditional Puneri dhol, a percussion instrument
