= Misal =

Indian dish

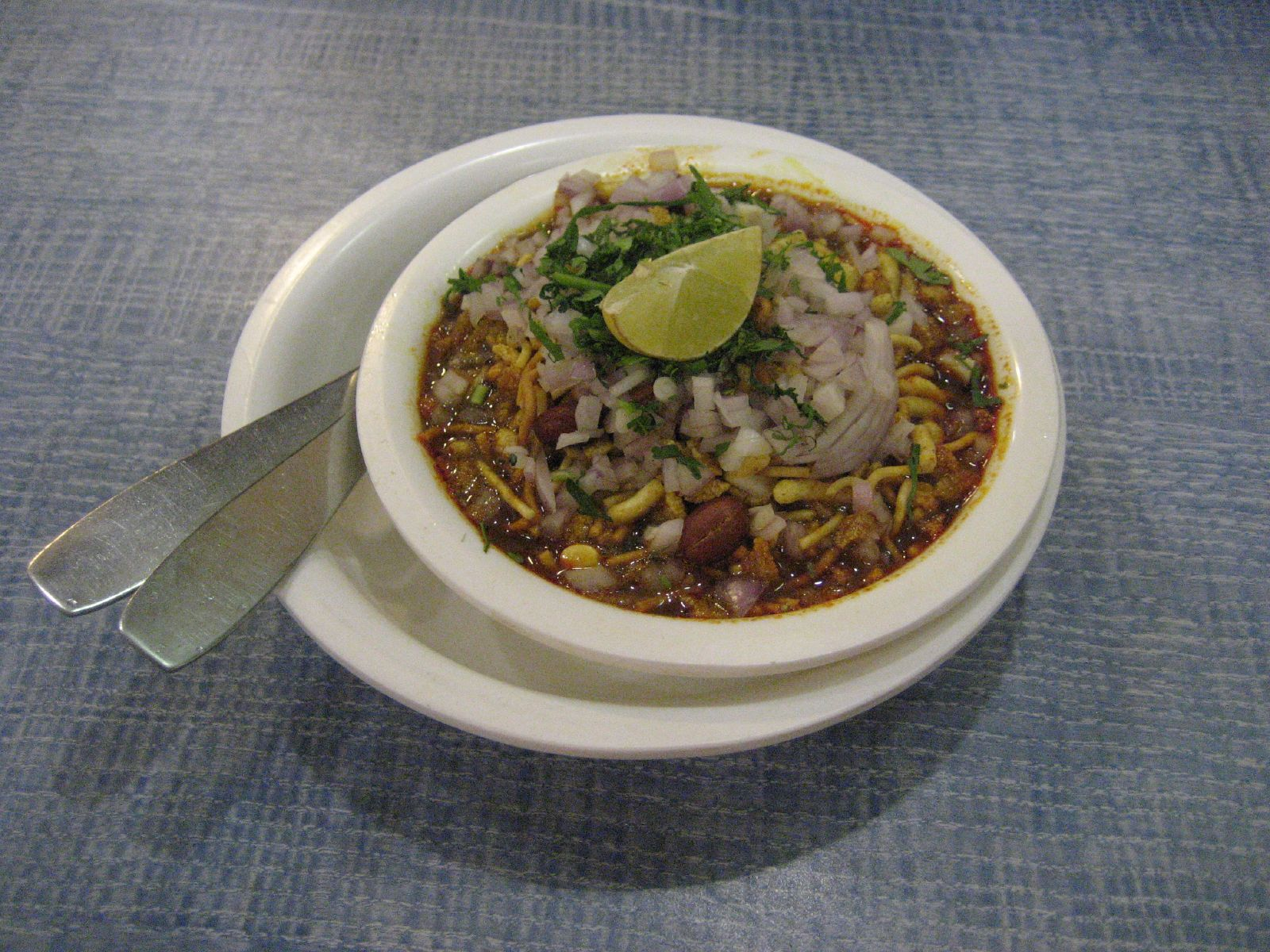
- Misal
- Alternative names: Misal Pav
- Course: main course, Snacks
- Place of origin: India
- Region or state: Maharashtra
- Serving temperature: Hot
- Main ingredients: sprouts, farsan, Indian spices, Pav or bread, lemon
- Variations: Kolhapuri Misal, Puneri Misal, Nashik Misal etc..
- Food energy (per serving): approximately 300 Calories per serving

Misaḷ (Marathi: मिसळ [misəɭ], meaning "mixture") is a very popular spicy dish in the Western Indian state of Maharashtra. The dish is mostly eaten for breakfast or as a midday snack or sometimes as a one-dish meal, often as part of misal pav. It remains a favourite snack since it is easy to make with affordable ingredients and has a good nutritional value. The taste of misal ranges from mildly to extremely spicy. And there are a lot of varieties as well (like Kolhapuri Misal, Puneri Misal,...etc.). Misal is also a popular traditional food of Maharashtra. The dish is always served hot.

The dish originates from the boundary of Khandesh and Western Maharashtra. Present day Nasik and Ahmednagar districts of Maharashtra.

== Ingredients ==
The ingredients of misal vary widely, and consist of a combination of the following:

- Usal, a curry made from matki (moth bean) or watane (dried pea) or even mung beans.
- Tarri/kat/sample/rassa, a spicy gravy. This is the heart of the dish and is usually made in many variants identified by colour as "kala rassa" (black), "laal rassa" (red), "hirwa rassa" (green) etc. The colour of the tarri is imparted by the ingredients used and not by artificial edible food colouring agents. In Maharashtra, various spices are present, and by using them, one can achieve the desired color of Tarri. For instance, Kolhapuri Misal is known for its spiciness, which is achieved through the use of kala masala.
- Batata Bhaji (boiled, diced potatoes, spiced with turmeric, chilies, ginger & mustard).
- Curd called dahi in Marathi (optional)
- Chivda (jaad poha chivda)
- Farsan/Shev (not required if Chivda is used), most of the misal in maharashtra use Farsan/Shev in it.
- Garnish of onions, tomatoes, coriander, lemon wedge
- Pav (Slice or Laadi), it is a special type of bread.

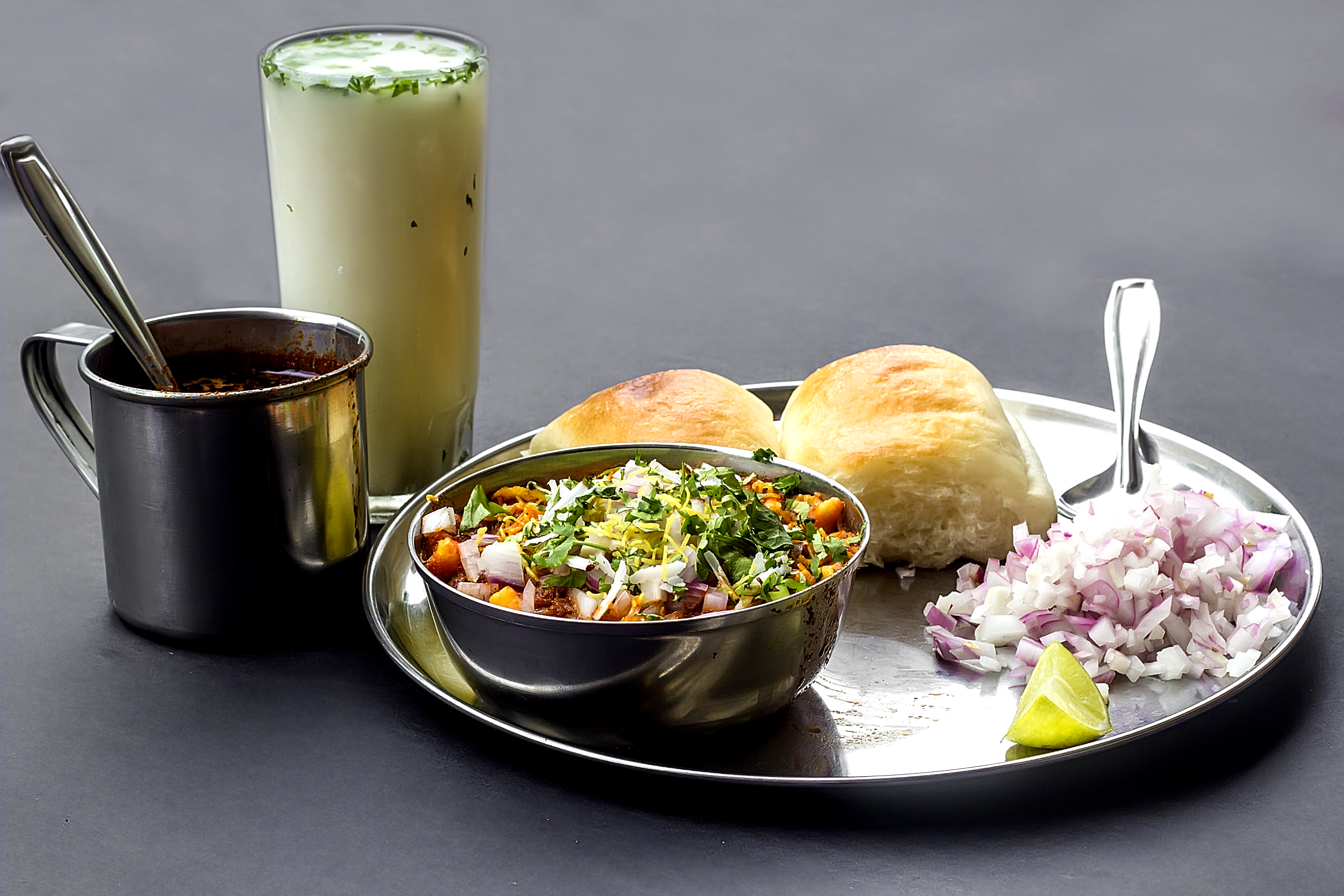
Kolhapuri Misal Pav with taak (buttermilk).

The ingredients are arranged in multiple tier fashion and served.

- The first ingredient to be served is matki or moth bean usal. Usal is sprouted beans cooked with tomatoes and onions. The nutritional value comes from the sprouted beans.
- The second layer is Batata bhaaji spread thin over the usal
- The third layer is Chivda also spread thin over the Batata Bhaaji.
- The fourth layer is a mixture of Onions, tomatoes, coriander and thin Sev.
- Tarri or Kat is added to fill up the bowl (more Tarri is served in a separate bowl)
- Misal is served with sliced bread or a small loaf, in the dish misal-pav.

== Variants ==
- There is a variant called "upwaas misal" that can also be eaten in case a person is on a religious fast, typically ganesh chaturthi. It contains food items made from potato, sabudana, peanuts etc.
- Mamledar Misal is in Thane City and is usually more spicy.
- Puneri Misal is another version that contains pohe.
- Jogeshwari Misal, Katakirr, Masti Misal, Chulivarchi Misal, Bedekar, Shri Krishna and Shree Upahar Gruh are amongst the more popular restaurants serving Misal in Pune
- The Kolhapuri version of misal is usually spicy and does not contain pohe and is served with thick slices of bread, not pav. Phadtare misal is famous in Kolhapur.
- In the Nasik region, misal is mostly served with a fried papad.
- Dahi misal is also one of the widely eaten forms, where curd is added to balance the spicy taste.
- Jain misal is another new variant in the misal industry, which does not contain any onion or garlic. Even the matki used is not sprouted, but just soaked. Masti Misal in Pune is famous for its Jain misal.
