= Vada pav =

Indian fast food item

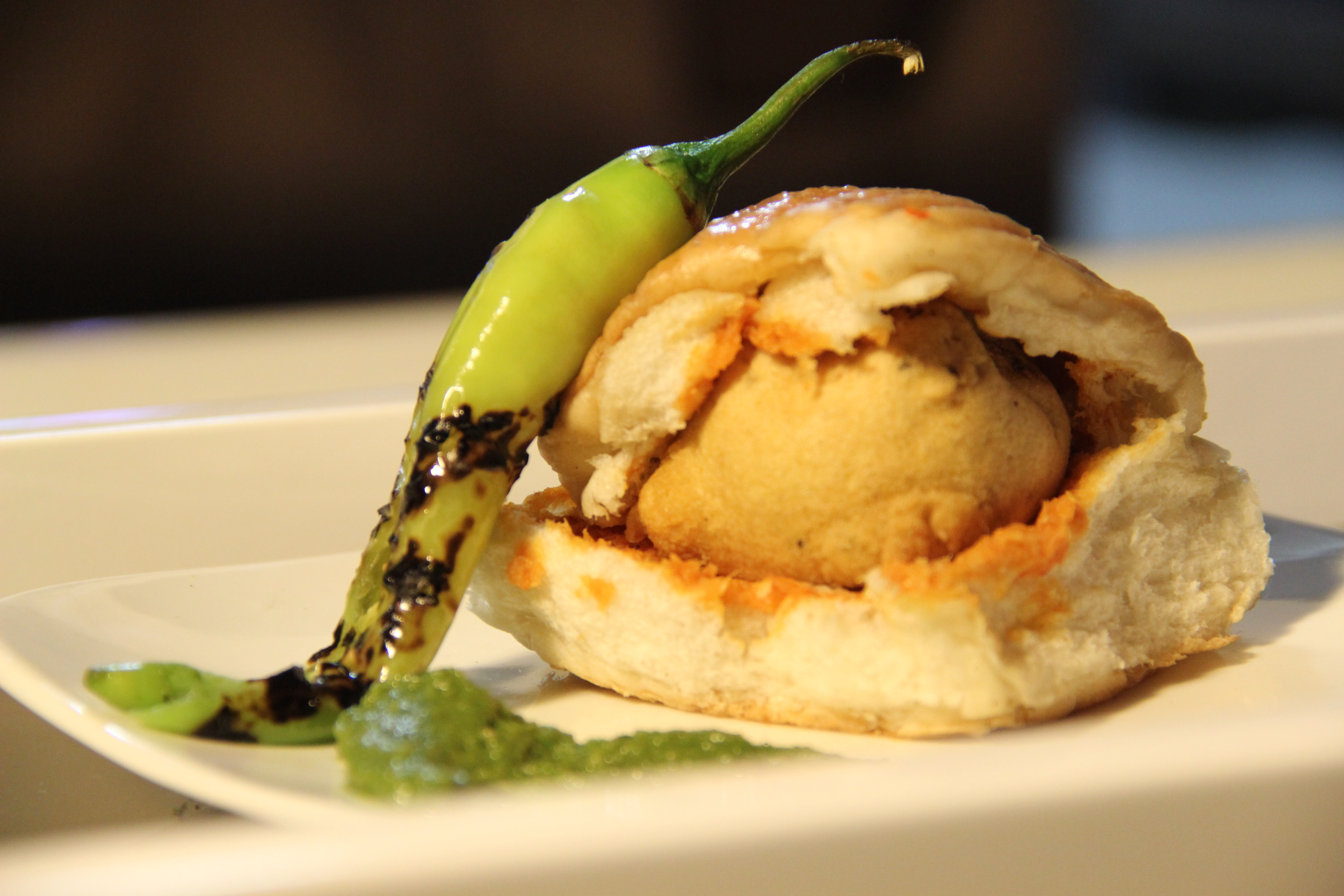
- A plate of vada pav with seasoning of red chilli powder and a green chilli
- Alternative names: Vada pao, wada pav, wada pao, pao vada, pav vada, pao wada, pav wada, batata wada pav
- Type: Snack
- Place of origin: India
- Region or state: Mumbai, Maharashtra
- Associated cuisine: Indian
- Created by: Ashok Vaidya and Sudhakar Mhatre
- Invented: 1966
- Main ingredients: Deep-fried fritter made of mashed potato and spices, bread bun

Vada pav, alternatively spelt wada pao, is a vegetarian fast food dish native to the Indian state of Maharashtra. The dish consists of a deep-fried potato dumpling placed inside a bread bun (pav) sliced almost in half through the middle. It is generally accompanied by one or more chutneys and a green chili pepper. Although it originated as an affordable street food in Mumbai, it is now served in food stalls and restaurants across India. It is also called Bombay burger in keeping with its origins and its resemblance in physical form to a burger.

The most famous snack in Mumbai, vada pav is claimed to be a part of the culture of Mumbaikars.

== Etymology ==
Batata vada in Marathi literally means "potato fritter". It is a combination of the word for "potato" (batata) and vada, a type of fried savoury snack. Pav is a derivative of the Portuguese word pão, which means bread.

== History ==
The most common theory of the vada pav's origin is that it was invented in the erstwhile mill-heartland of Central Mumbai. Ashok Vaidya of Dadar is often credited with starting the first vada pav stall outside Dadar railway station in 1966. Some sources credit Sudhakar Mhatre, who started his business around the same time. One of the earliest kiosks selling vada pav is said to be Khidki Vada Pav, located in Kalyan. It was started in the late 1960s by the Vaze family, who used to hand out vada pavs from a window (Khidki) of their house facing the road.

The carbohydrate-rich snack catered to the cotton mill workers of what was then known as Girangaon. This potato dumpling (batata vada), placed inside a pav was quick to make, cheap (~10-15 paisa in 1971), and more convenient than the batata bhaji and chapati combination, which could not be eaten in overcrowded local trains.

=== Cultural importance ===
The closing of textile mills in central Mumbai led to turmoil in the 1970s. Shiv Sena, the homegrown party formed during this transformative time, based itself as a party with mill workers' interests. The party chief, Balasaheb Thackeray, encouraged Marathi people in the 1960s to become entrepreneurs, i.e., start food stalls in ways similar to the South Indians setting up Udupi restaurants. Shiv Sena attempted to physically and ideologically claim the streets through agitations as well as neighborhood-level events such as vada pav sammelan ("vada pav jamborees"). This theme has continued even in recent years, as with the 2009 introduction of the "Shiv vada pav".

== Variations and commercialization ==
There are over 20,000 stalls selling vada pav in Mumbai. Mumbai alone has many variations of the food based on the locality. Large fast food restaurant chains such as Kunjvihar, Jumbo King in Mulund and Goli Vada Pav also primarily serve vada pav. Outside of Mumbai, a variant of vada pav is pav vada, which is famous in Nashik.

Annually, August 23 is celebrated as World Vada Paav Day.

== Preparation ==
A boiled potato is mashed and mixed with chopped green chilli, garlic, mustard seeds, and spices (usually asafoetida and turmeric). The mass is then shaped into a ball, dipped into gram flour batter, and deep-fried. The resulting fritter is placed inside a bread bun and served with one or more chutneys, most commonly a spicy lasun-khobara (garlic-coconut) chutney, along with fried green chilli.

== Gallery ==
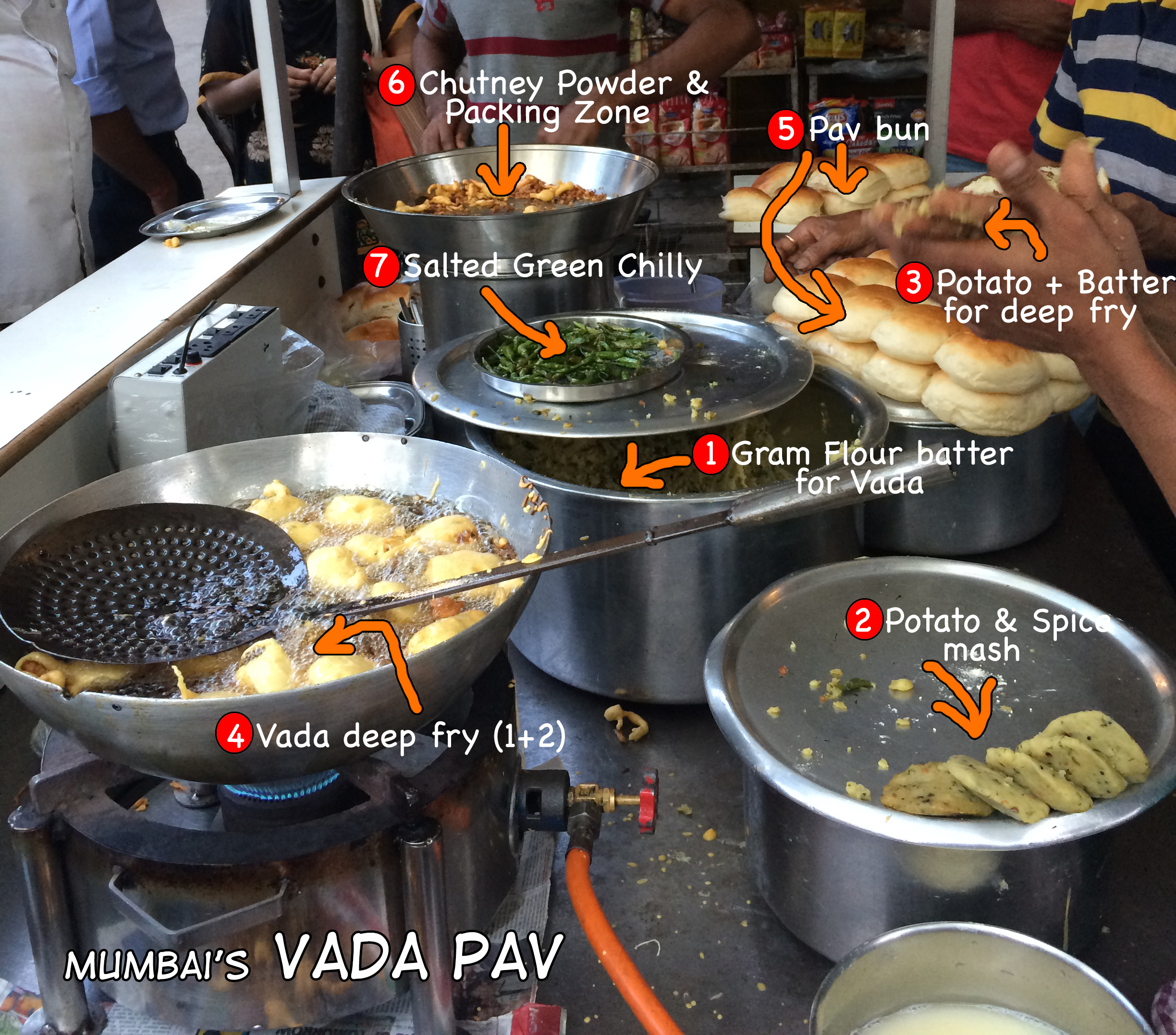
Pictorial description of the ingredients and recipe of vada pav

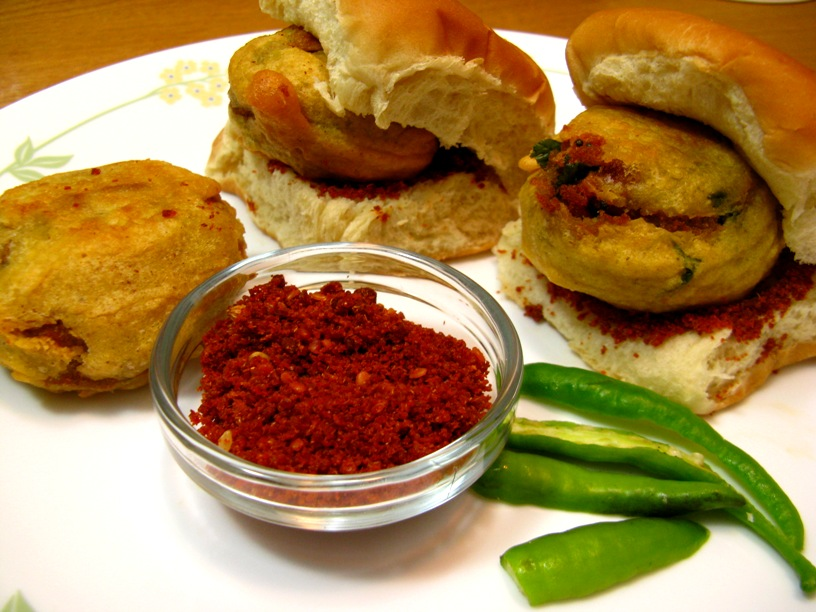
One batata (potato) vada, two vada pavs, raw green chillies, and seasoning of red garlic chutney

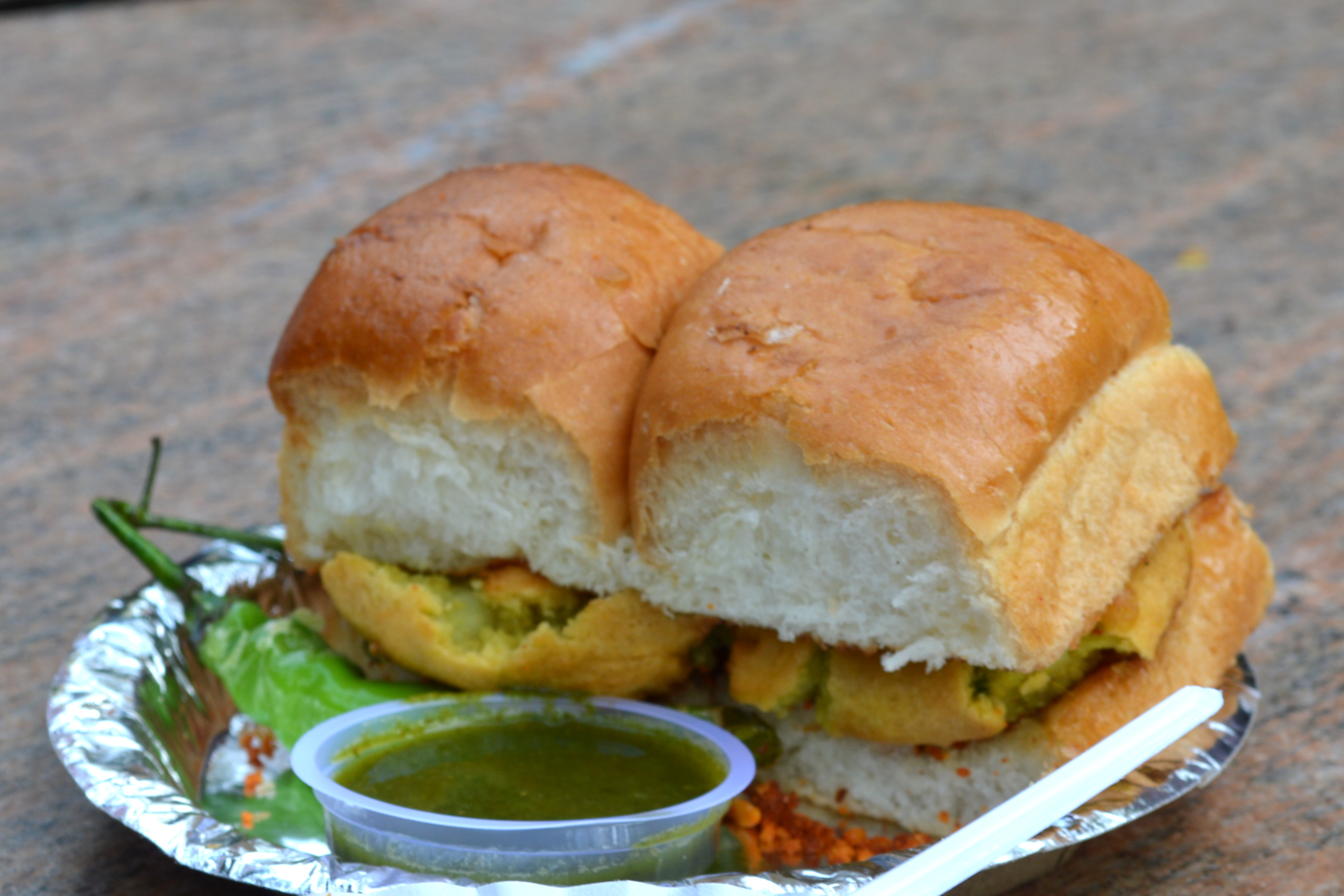
Vada pav served with a side of green chilli pepper, red peanut and garlic chutney, and green chutney

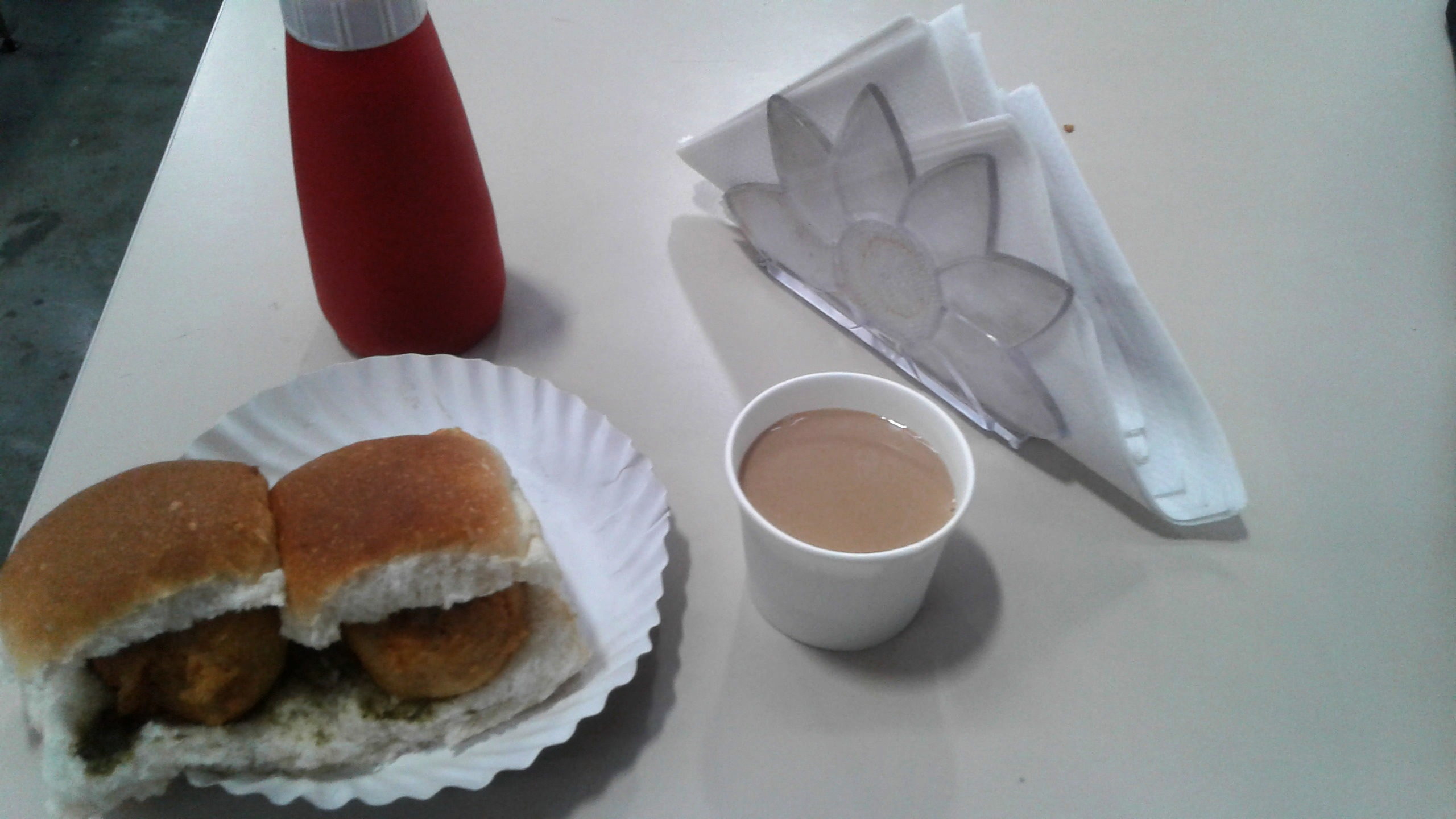
Vada Pavu (local variant of spelling) and a cup of tea in Mysuru

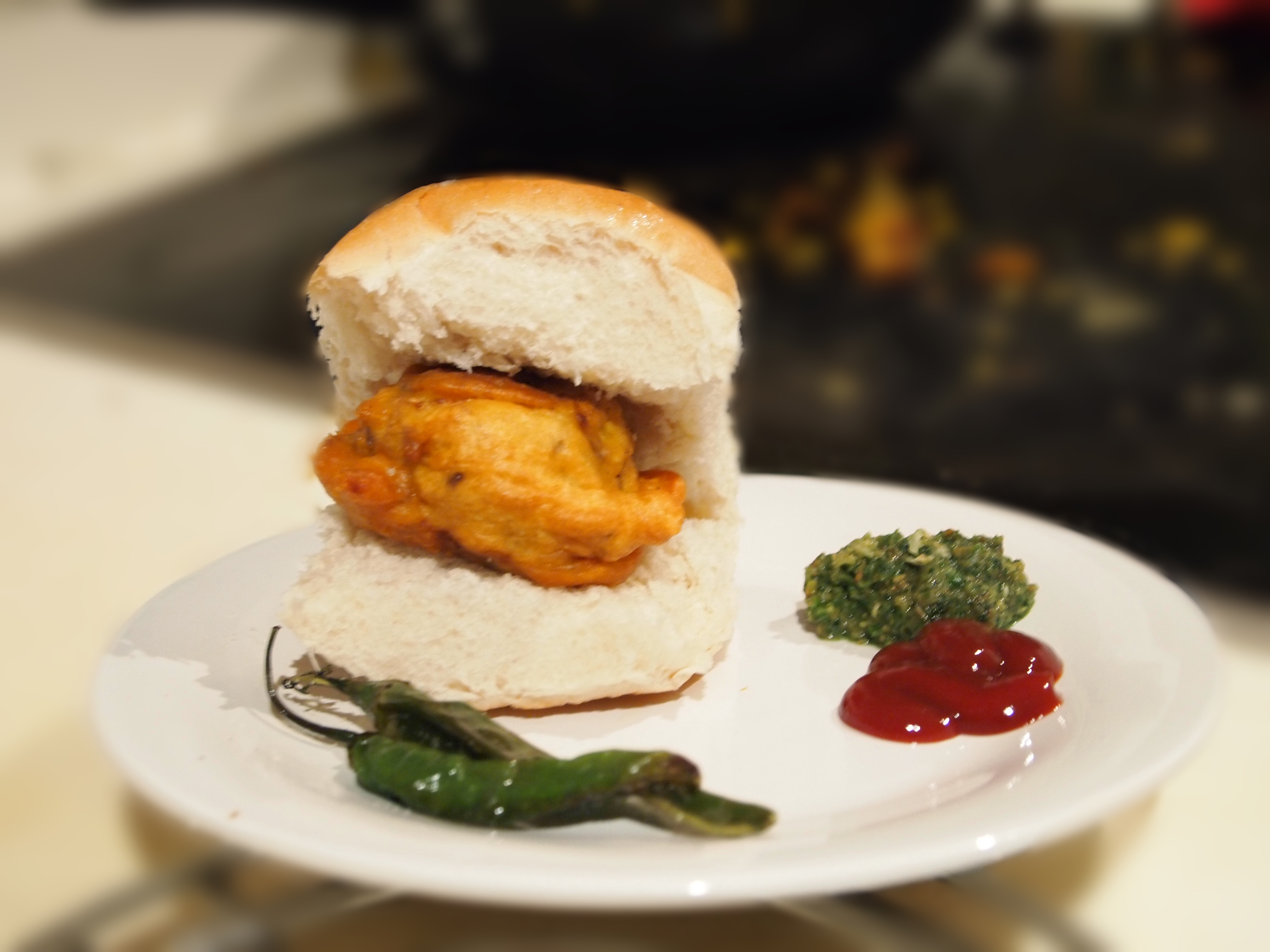

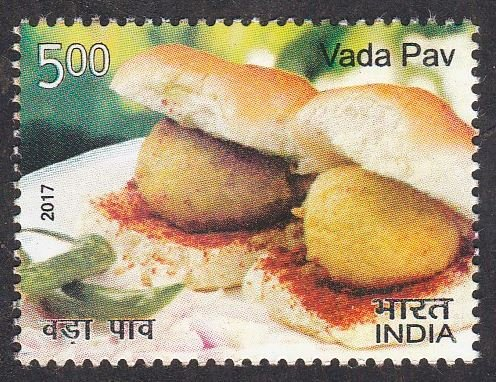
Vada Pav on Indian Postal Stamp 2017

== See also ==
- Aloo tikki
- Chinese bhel
- List of sandwiches
- Veggie burger
- Misal pav
- Pav bhaji
- Bun kebab
- Dabeli
