= Goli Vada Pav =

Indian fast food restaurant chain

Goli Vada Pav Pvt. Ltd
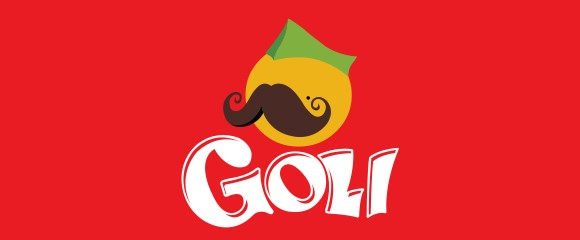
- Type: Private
- Industry: Quick service Restaurants
- Founded: 2004; 22 years ago in Mumbai, India
- Founder: Venkatesh Iyer
- Headquarters: Vikhroli, Mumbai, Maharashtra, India
- Key people: Venkatesh Iyer (CEO)
- Products: Vada Pav, Sabudana Vada
- Revenue: ▲₹55 Crore (2015)
- Number of employees: 150–200 (2016)
- Parent: Goli Vada Pav Pvt. Ltd
- Website: m.golivadapav.com

Goli Vada Pav is an Indian fast food restaurant chain originated from Mumbai, Maharashtra, India. It was founded in 2004 as a vada pav restaurant by Venkatesh Iyer. It currently operates in over 100 cities with over 300 stores.

== History ==
Goli Vada Pav was founded by Venkatesh Iyer. The chain started operations in early 2004 with a single ‘Quick service restaurant’. The first outlet was set up in Kalyan, a suburban locality in Mumbai. The company raised ₹21 crores from venture fund VenturEast in 2011. A large-scale expansion of the outlets had to be abandoned due to the limited popularity of the franchise in Mumbai. At this point, Venkatesh Iyer received an offer from an acquaintance to set up an outlet in the city of Nashik in Maharashtra. Soon enough Goli Vada Pav was set up in over 40 cities with 150 outlet, and is now the 4th biggest fast food company in India.

Goli Vada Pav stores operate under the name of 'Goli Vadapav No.1'

== Awards and recognition ==
1. Golden Spoon Award-Most Admired Food Chain of Indian Origin, by Coca-Cola.
2. 6th Largest QSR Brand in India.

== Read more ==
- "Business Opportunity in Ethnic Fast Food Industry – Goli Vadapav No.1" Compiled By – Manoj Gupta
- "CEO of Goli Vada Pav holds four classroom sessions at the ISB"
- "Food chain Goli Vada Pav gets ₹21-crore funds from VenturEast"
