= Puneri misal =

Vegetarian dish from India

Puneri Misal
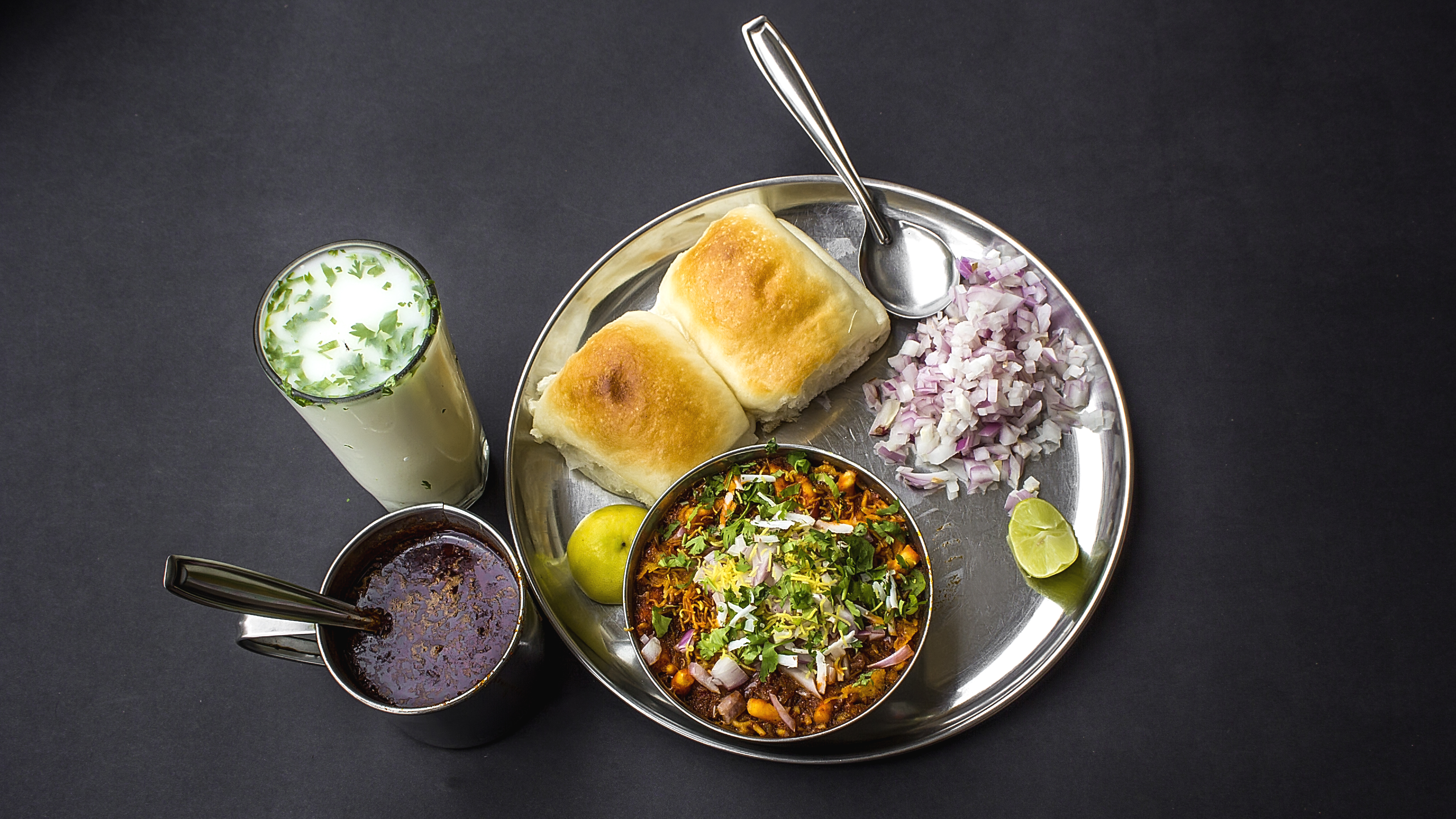
- Puneri Misal
- Alternative names: Puneri Misal Pav
- Course: Snack
- Region or state: Pune, India
- Serving temperature: Hot
- Main ingredients: Matki; Usal; tarry/kat/sample; Potato bhaji, Yogurt, Chivda; Farsan, Onions, Tomatoes, Coriander
- Variations: Various

Puneri misal is a popular vegetarian dish from Pune, Maharashtra, India. The dish is eaten for breakfast or as a midday snack or meal, often as part of misal pav. It remains a very popular snack since it is easy to make, is relatively cheap and has good nutritional value. The taste of Puneri-misal ranges from mild to spicy. Misal is also a popular street food. This dish is not so hot and spicy like Kolhapuri Misal. The dish originates from Pune based on the taste requirement of local people.

== Ingredients ==
The ingredients of misal include matki usal, tarry/kat/sample, potato bhaji, yogurt, chivda, farsan, garnish of onions, tomatoes, and coriander. The ingredients are arranged in multiple tier fashion and served. The first ingredient to be served is matki or moth bean usal. Misal is served with sliced bread or a small loaf, in the dish misal-paw. The main part of the misal is the spicy curry, called tarry, kat. These are pre-cooked or pre-mixed food items and do have separate identity as edible by themselves. and is usually more spicy.

Puneri Misal is less spicy version of Misal. Dahi misal is also one of the widely eaten forms, where curd is added to enhance the taste.
