= Vangibath =

South Indian dish

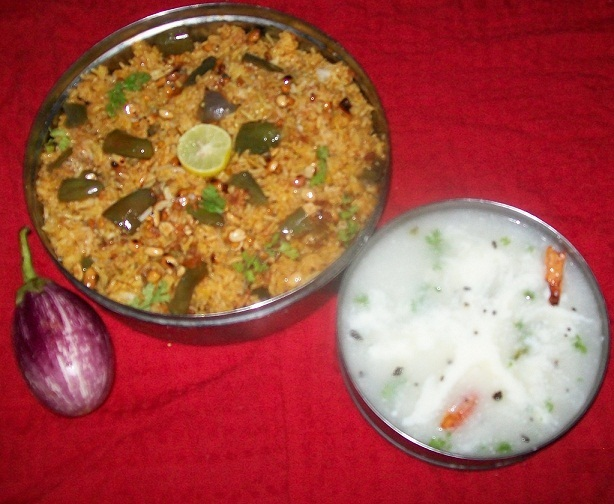
Vangi Bath

Vangi Bath (Kannada: ವಾಂಗಿ ಬಾತ್) is a vegetarian South Indian dish that originated in Karnataka, Mysuru region, though it is found throughout India. Vangi means brinjal (eggplant) and bhath means rice. Mostly viewed as a dry dish, it is accompanied by Mosaru Bajji or Raita. The flavor is that of coconut and coriander blended well with some mild spices. Traditionally, the dish is prepared using younger, green brinjal, though any variety of brinjal can be used in the creation of the dish, though the final result may differ between the varieties, and some opt out of using brinjal at all.

== Types of eggplants used ==
Usually, Fairytale or Barbarella are used. Fairy Tale is a thinner variety of eggplant with stripes and has a buttery texture and taste, so it cooks very fast. It has less seeds so it works very well in this dish.

== Substitutions of eggplants ==
It is possible to prepare this dish in the same way with just Capsicum. It also works well with Potato or Ivy Gourd.

== Tradition and culture ==
Vangi Bhath is a dish also prepared especially during festivals or family get-togethers, feasts, etc. Normally a good quantity of vangi bhath masala is made in advance and stored at least for about 2 weeks and used again or use it with other vegetables.

== Ingredients ==
Main Ingredients: Eggplant, Rice

== Recipe ==
8-10 baby eggplants, cut into 4 with stems intact

1.5 cups rice – cooked

2 teaspoons + 2 tablespoons oil

chopped fresh coriander for garnishing

6-7 dried red chillies

1 tablespoon split Bengal gram (chana dal, soaked and drained)

Scraped coconut for garnishing

8-10 curry leaves

2-3 green chillies, split

2 teaspoons tamarind pulp

1 teaspoon mustard seeds

0.5 teaspoon turmeric powder

8-10 black peppercorns

2-3 cloves

1 teaspoon fennel seeds

2 teaspoons poppy seeds

2-3 green cardamoms

pinch of asafoetida

salt

== Side notes ==
The Dish was used in August 2017 by Chief Minister Siddaramaiah to counter those who are opposed to pro-poor policies.

He said: “For the past three years, it’s only Mr. Modi’s Mann ki Baat that’s going on. But we are only concerned about vangibath for the poor.”
