= Misal pav =

Curry based savory dish from Maharashtra, India

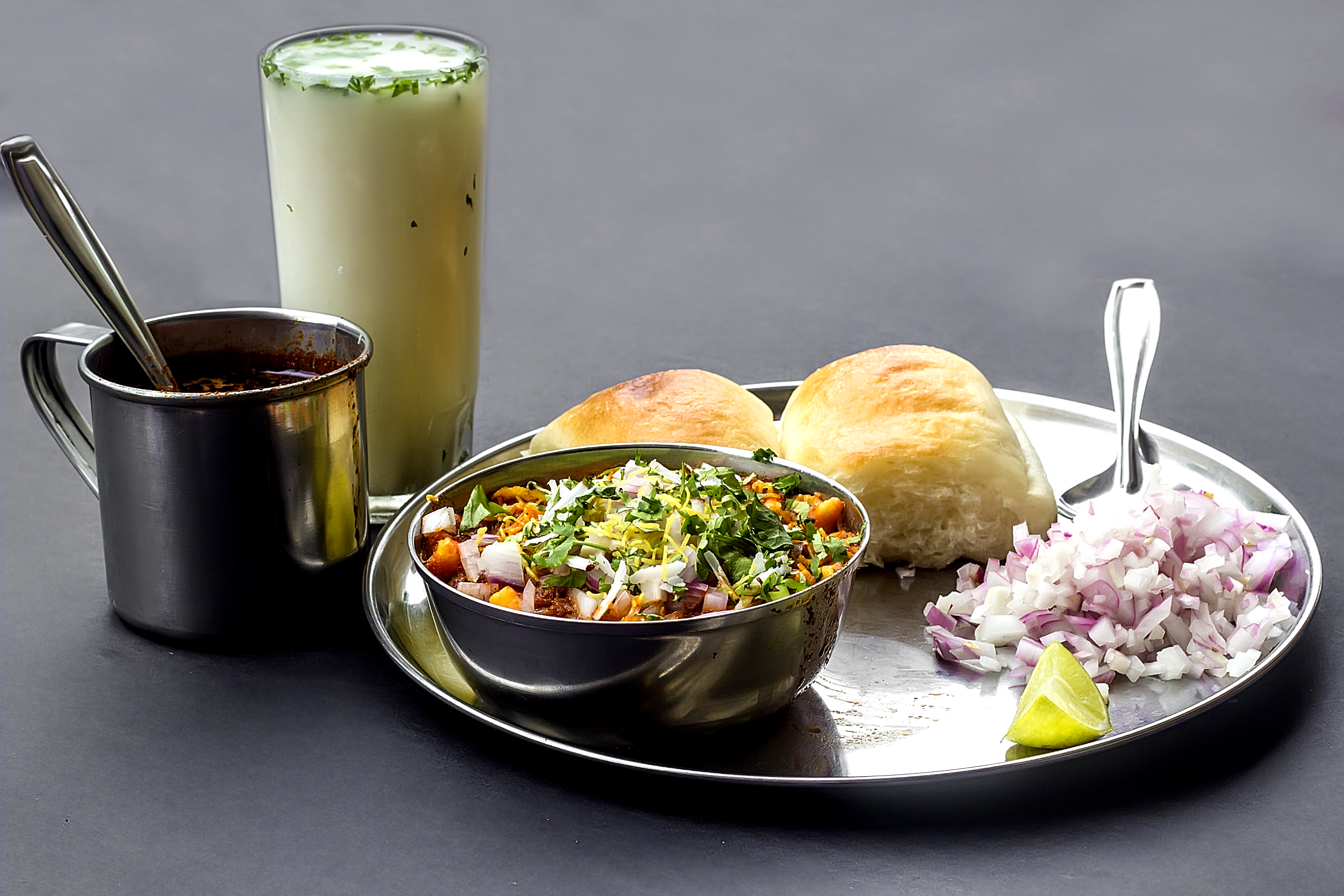
- A plate of misal pav
- Alternative names: Misal
- Type: Curry and bread
- Place of origin: India
- Region or state: Mumbai, Pune, Nashik, Kolhapur, Maharashtra
- Associated cuisine: Indian
- Serving temperature: Hot
- Main ingredients: Sprouts, peas, bean sprouts, chick peas and chilli powder gravy
- Variations: Misal vada
- Food energy (per serving): 289 cal

Misal pav (Marathi: मिसळपाव) is a dish from the Indian state of Maharashtra. It consists of a vegetable curry, mostly made from moth beans, locally known as misal, and pav, which is a type of Indian bread roll. The final dish is topped with farsan or sev, onions, lemon and coriander (cilantro). It is usually served hot with bread or rolls toasted with butter and buttermilk or dahi and papad. Misal pav is served as a breakfast dish, as a snack and also as a full meal.

== Misal regional varieties ==
Misal pav from Kolhapur is known for its high spice content and unique taste. (Note: "Nashik misal is rather well flavored with chili; the misal includes rice flakes called poha also sabudana khichadi sometimes. This latter ingredient, reconstituted and quickly sautéed with chopped onion, mustard seeds, turmeric, and green chilli is another breakfast ...") There are different versions of misal pav such as Pune misal, Khandeshi misal, Nashik misal and Ahmednagar misal. Other types are kalya masalyachi misal, shev misal, and dahi (yoghurt) misal.

== Preparation ==
Misal is prepared in part with sprouted lentils and has less water content and a watery, spicy "kat" (pronounced "cut"). It has two parts, a thick curry of matki, called usal, and watery gravy, also called rassa. Usually people mix these two according to their taste and requirement. When moth beans are unavailable, it is sometimes prepared using mung beans. It may be garnished with Indian snack noodles. The moth curry or usal form is prepared using onion, ginger, garlic and other spices.

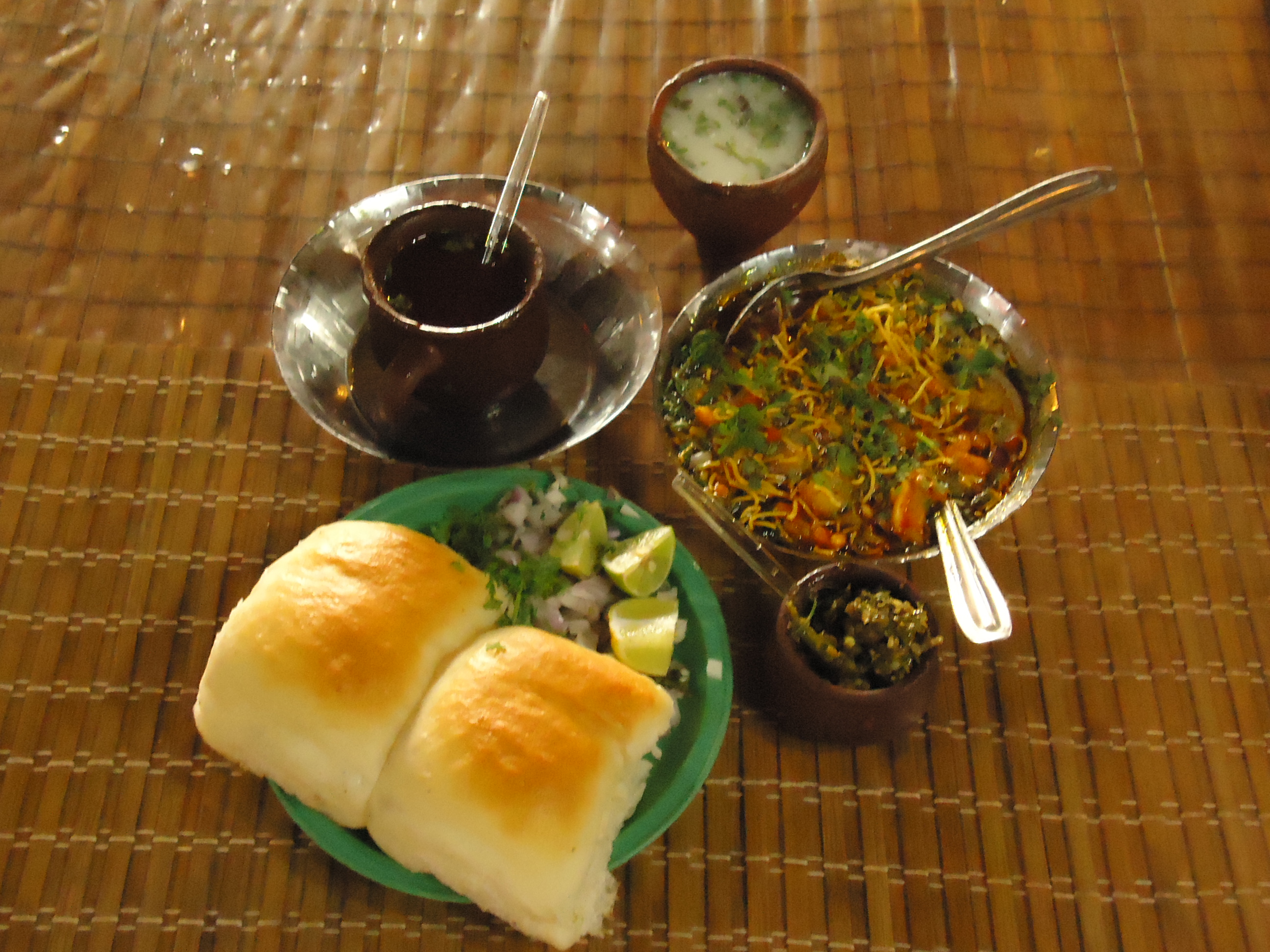
Misal pav

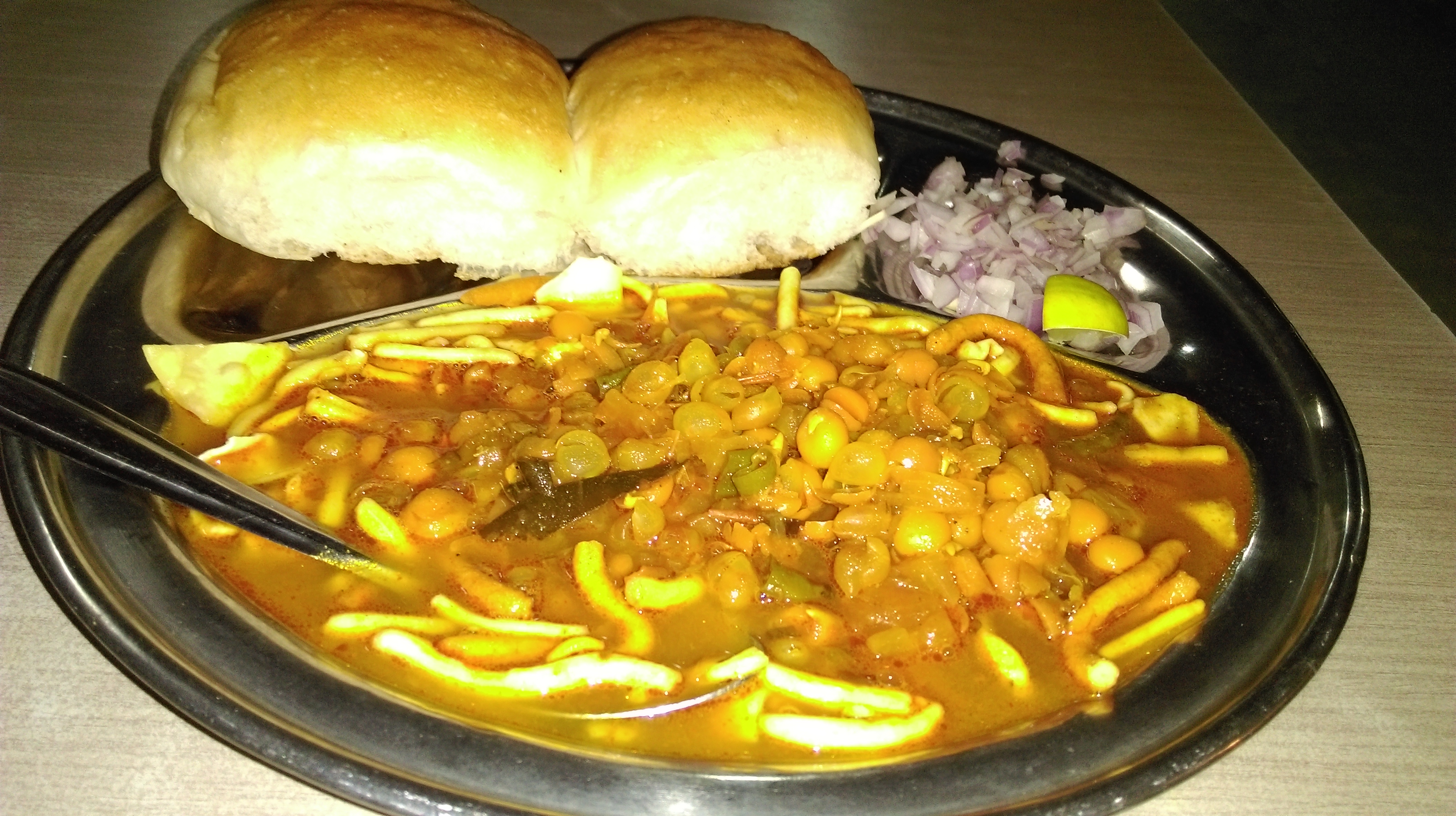
Close-up view of misal pav

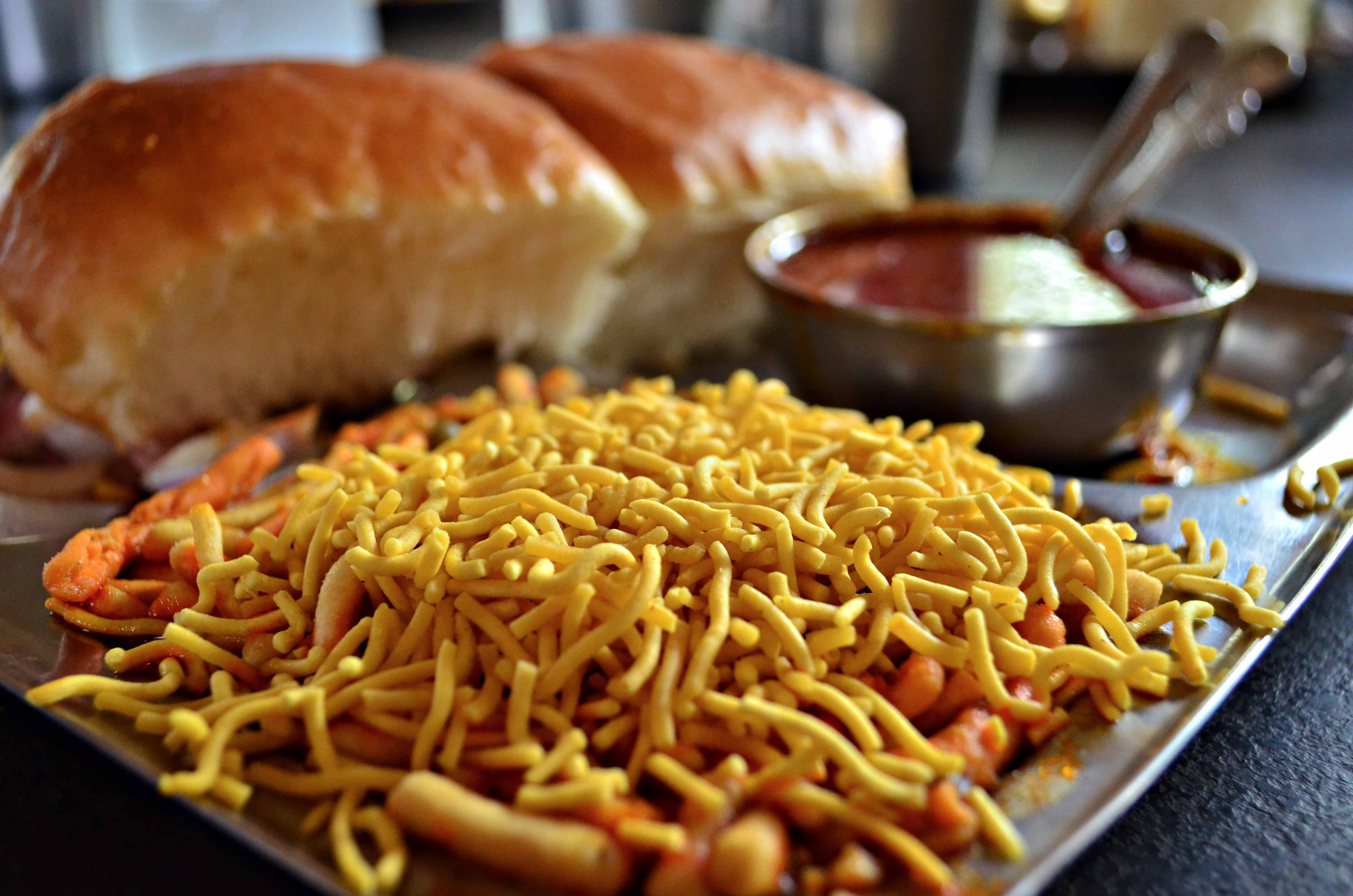
Misal pav topped with Indian snack farsan or sev

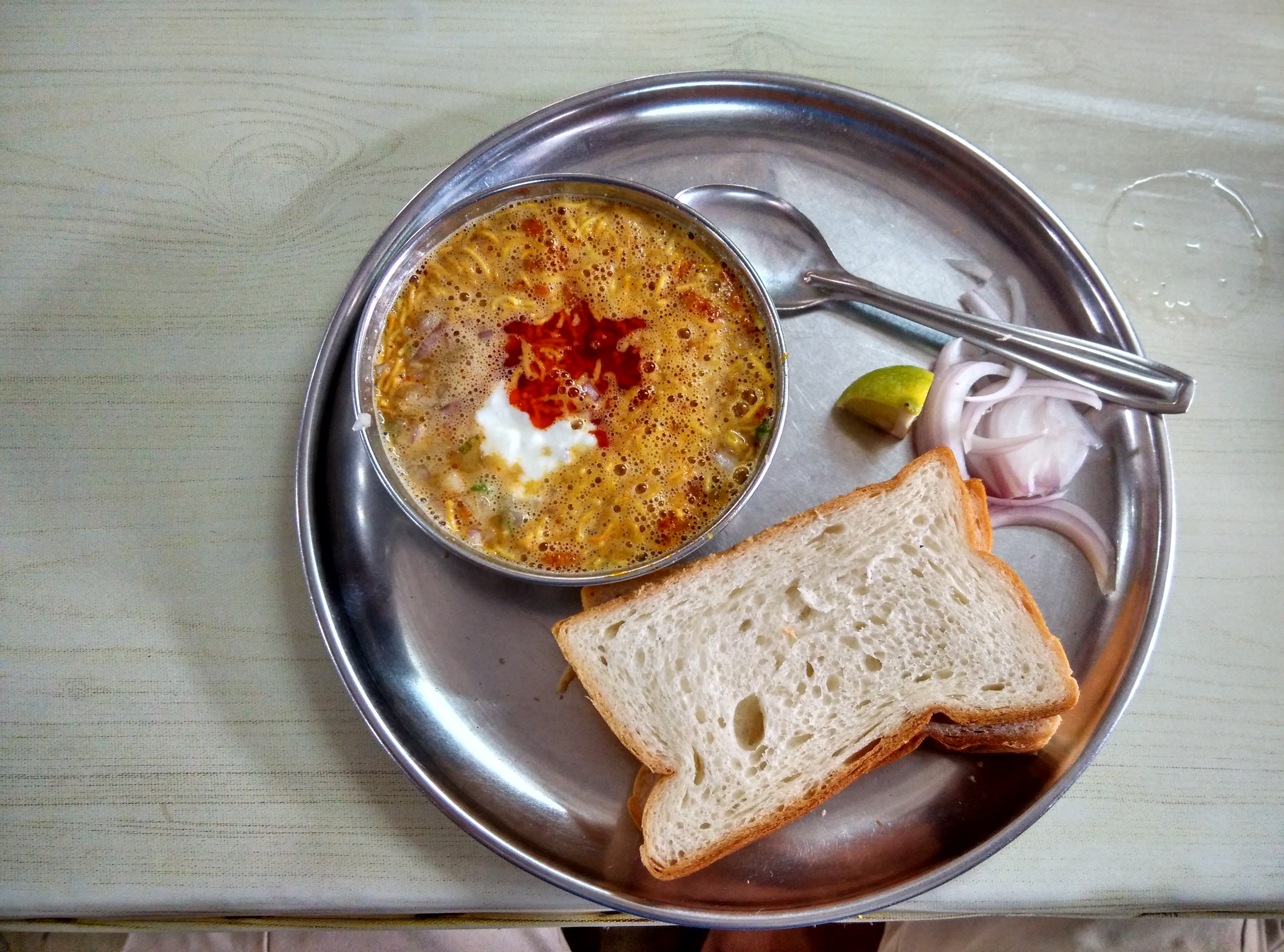
Misal bread (Kolhapuri misal)

== Recognition ==
In 2015, the misal pav served at Dadar's Aaswad restaurant was named the world's tastiest vegetarian dish at the FoodieHub Awards in London.

== Variants ==
- The Nashik version of misal is usually spicy and served with pav, curd, papad, chopped coriander and onion. Several misal joints are popular in the city.
- Puneri misal is another version that contains pohe. There are a number of restaurants in the city that are popular for their misal. While most Misal variants are at a spicier side, Puneri Misal often has a sweet to tangy taste.
- Many renowned restaurants in Maharashtra have been serving Misal for decades, including Jogeshwari Misal, Katakir Misal, Mamledar Misal, Bedekar Misal, and Thorat's Barbeque Misal among others.

== See also ==
- List of Indian dishes
