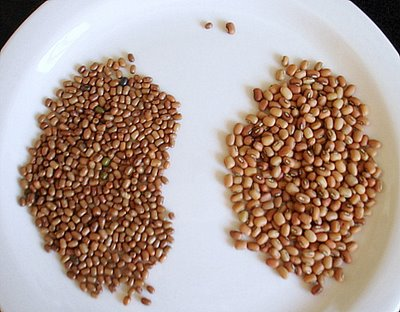

Scientific classification
- Kingdom: Plantae
- Clade: Tracheophytes
- Clade: Angiosperms
- Clade: Eudicots
- Clade: Rosids
- Order: Fabales
- Family: Fabaceae
- Subfamily: Faboideae
- Genus: Vigna
- Species: V. aconitifolia

Binomial name
- Vigna aconitifolia (Jacq.) Marechal

Synonyms
- Phaseolus aconitifolius Jacq.

= Vigna aconitifolia =

Species of flowering plant

Vigna aconitifolia is a drought-resistant legume, commonly grown in arid and semi-arid regions of India. It is commonly called mat bean, moth bean, matki or dew bean.

Moth bean is a creeping annual herbaceous plant which grows to approximately 40 centimetres (16 in) high. Yellow flowers on its hairy and densely packed branches develop into yellow-brown pods, 2 to 3 inches in length. The beans of these pods contain approximately 22–24% protein.

The pods, sprouts, and protein-rich seeds of this crop are commonly consumed in India. Moth bean can be grown on many soil types, and can also act as a pasture legume. Due to its drought-resistant qualities, its ability to combat soil erosion and its high protein content, moth bean has been identified as possibly a more significant food source in the future. It has been suggested that its suitability as a grain legume in semi-arid Africa should be further investigated.

== Description ==
Mothbeans, mature seeds, raw
Nutritional value per 100 g (3.5 oz)
- Energy: 1,436 kJ (343 kcal)
- Carbohydrates: 61.5 g
- Fat: 1.6 g
- Protein: 22.9 g
Vitamins and minerals
Vitamins	Quantity %DV^{†}
Thiamine (B1)	50% 0.6 mg
Riboflavin (B2)	8% 0.1 mg
Niacin (B3)	18% 2.8 mg
Pantothenic acid (B5)	10% 0.5 mg
Vitamin B6	24% 0.4 mg
Folate (B9)	162% 649 μg
Choline	0% 0 mg
Vitamin C	8% 7 mg
Vitamin E	0% 0 mg
Vitamin K	0% 0 μg
Minerals	Quantity %DV^{†}
Calcium	12% 150 mg
Iron	60% 10.8 mg
Magnesium	91% 381 mg
Manganese	78% 1.8 mg
Phosphorus	39% 489 mg
Potassium	40% 1191 mg
Sodium	1% 30 mg
Zinc	17% 1.9 mg
- Other constituents: Quantity
- Water: 9.7 g
- Ash: 4.3 g
- ^{†}Percentages estimated using US recommendations for adults, except for potassium, which is estimated based on expert recommendation from the National Academies.

Taxonomically moth bean belongs to the family Fabaceae (subfamily Papilionoideae), and genus Vigna. It is an herbaceous creeping annual that creates a low-lying soil cover when fully grown. Its stem can grow up to 40 centimetres (16 in) in height, with its hairy and dense-packed branches reaching a span of up to 150 cm (59 in).

Yellow flowers develop into a brown pod 2.5 to 5 cm in length, which holds 4 to 9 seeds inside. The rectangular seeds exist in a variety of colours including yellow-brown, whitish-green, and mottled with black. Other widely cultivated species from the genus Vigna include the adzuki bean (V. angularis), the black gram (V. mungo), the cowpea (V. unguiculata, including the variety known as the black-eyed pea), and the mung bean (V. radiata).

== History and geography ==
Moth bean is native to India, grown for food production and as a forage and cover crop. It is predominately grown in India, although it has been cultivated in the United States, Australia, Thailand and other parts of Asia. 1.5 million hectares of land is used in India for moth bean production, producing approximately 0.4 million t/ha of seeds. While its presence in Sudan, Somalia and other tropical countries of Africa has been noted, it has not been a crop of great importance to this region. The potential of increased production in this region in the future has been suggested.

== Growing conditions ==
Moth bean, a short-day crop, is one of the most drought-resistant pulses in India. Grown at altitudes up to 1300 m above sea level, it has a wide pH range (3.5–10) and can tolerate slight salinity. While dry sandy soil is most suitable for production, moth bean can tolerate a variety of soil types. The low-lying soil cover the crop creates helps prevent soil erosion by preventing moisture loss.

Optimum production of moth bean occurs between 24–32 °C, but has been shown to tolerate up to 45 °C during the day. Growth is optimal at a constant temperature. The moth bean is one of the most drought-resistant pulses in India, requiring little irrigation for production. While optimal annual rainfall for production is 500–750 mm, it is able to grow with 200–300 mm annually, and some yield has been noted at rainfall levels as low as 50–60 mm per year. Propagation of moth bean is done by seed, preferably on a prepared seedbed, at an optimal temperature of 25–27 °C. Fertilizer applications to moth bean are uncommon in India.

== Animal consumption ==
Moth bean is consumed as forage by animals.

== Cultivation ==
Moth bean is grown for both human consumption and as a forage crop. Currently in India, moth bean is grown on its own or intercropped with other cereals, such as pearl millet. It is also grown in rotation with cotton as a forage crop. When grown as a forage crop, it is planted 7–34 kg/ha, and 10–20 kg/ha when grown as the only crop. Row planting should be done 30–90 cm apart, with seeds sown 2.5–4 cm deep. It takes 75–90 days for moth bean to mature, and is frequently planted at the end of the rainy season.

A drawback to this crop is its difficulty to harvest. Mowers cannot be used due to the shape and density of the moth bean's branches, so the crop is typically cut with a sickle. It is threshed and winnowed after being dried for approximately one week. Hay yields from this crop are 7.5-10 t/ha, while forage matter yields range from 37-50 t/ha. Seed yields are currently low, ranging from 70–270 kg/ha. However, research shows that this crop has the potential to increase in yield. Experimental seed yields of up to 2600 kg/ha have been recorded in the US and Australia.

=== Major pests and diseases ===
Moth bean is affected by mungbean yellow mosaic virus, for which silverleaf whitefly is the vector. Root rot and seedling blight from Macrophomina phaseolina also cause damage, as well as some Striga species and the nematode Meloidogyne incognita. There are some resistant cultivars to these pests and diseases.

== Genetic stock ==
Little breeding work has been completed on the moth bean, but researchers have found that there is substantial genetic variation between moth bean germplasms. The National Bureau of Plant Genetic Resources in New Delhi, India, houses more than 1000 accessions. Some improved cultivars such as 'CZM-2', 'CZM-3', 'RMO-40' and 'RMO-225' are available in India.

== Human consumption ==
Whole or split moth bean seeds can be cooked or fried. In India, particularly in the state of Maharashtra, moth beans are sprouted before cooking and used for making a spicy stew called matki usal. Matki usal forms the base of the Indian street food dish called misal pav. Fried dal of the bean is used to make a dry savory snack, known in India as dalmoth. The moth bean pods can be boiled and eaten. The flour of the bean is used for making another savoury snack called bhujia.

== Nutritional information ==
100g of raw, uncooked moth bean seeds contain 343 calories, 23 g of protein, 62 g of carbohydrate and 1.6 g of fat. As is the case with other legumes, this pulse does contain antinutritional factors that limit available protein. However, research has shown that the moth bean contains considerably less of these factors compared with other legume grains, making it a more beneficial choice for consumption. Soaking and cooking moth beans before consumption helps to break down antinutritional factors and makes the protein more digestible.

== Constraints to wider adaptation ==
While its drought tolerance and high protein content could make the moth bean a potential crop choice for semi-arid Africa, a lack of management knowledge and the difficulty of harvest due to its density and creeping nature could make its spread to other parts of the world difficult.
