= Pav bhaji =

Thin vegetable curry based savory dish in India

Pav Bhaji
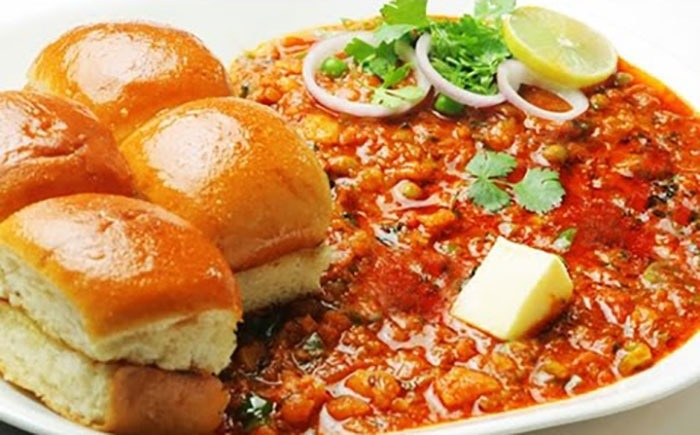
- A plate of Pav Bhaji.
- Alternative names: Bhaji-pav
- Course: Main
- Place of origin: India
- Region or state: Mumbai, Maharashtra
- Serving temperature: Hot
- Main ingredients: Bread, mixed vegetables
- Variations: Red Pav Bhaji, Masala Pav Bhaji, Black Pav Bhaji, Green Pav Bhaji, Khada Pav Bhaji

Pav bhaji, or pao bhaji (Marathi : पाव भाजी pāʋ bhājī) is a staple food of Maharashtra, consisting of a thick spicy vegetable curry (bhaji) served with a soft, buttered bread roll (pav). It is typically served either as a street snack or main dish, and originates from Maharashtra.

== History ==
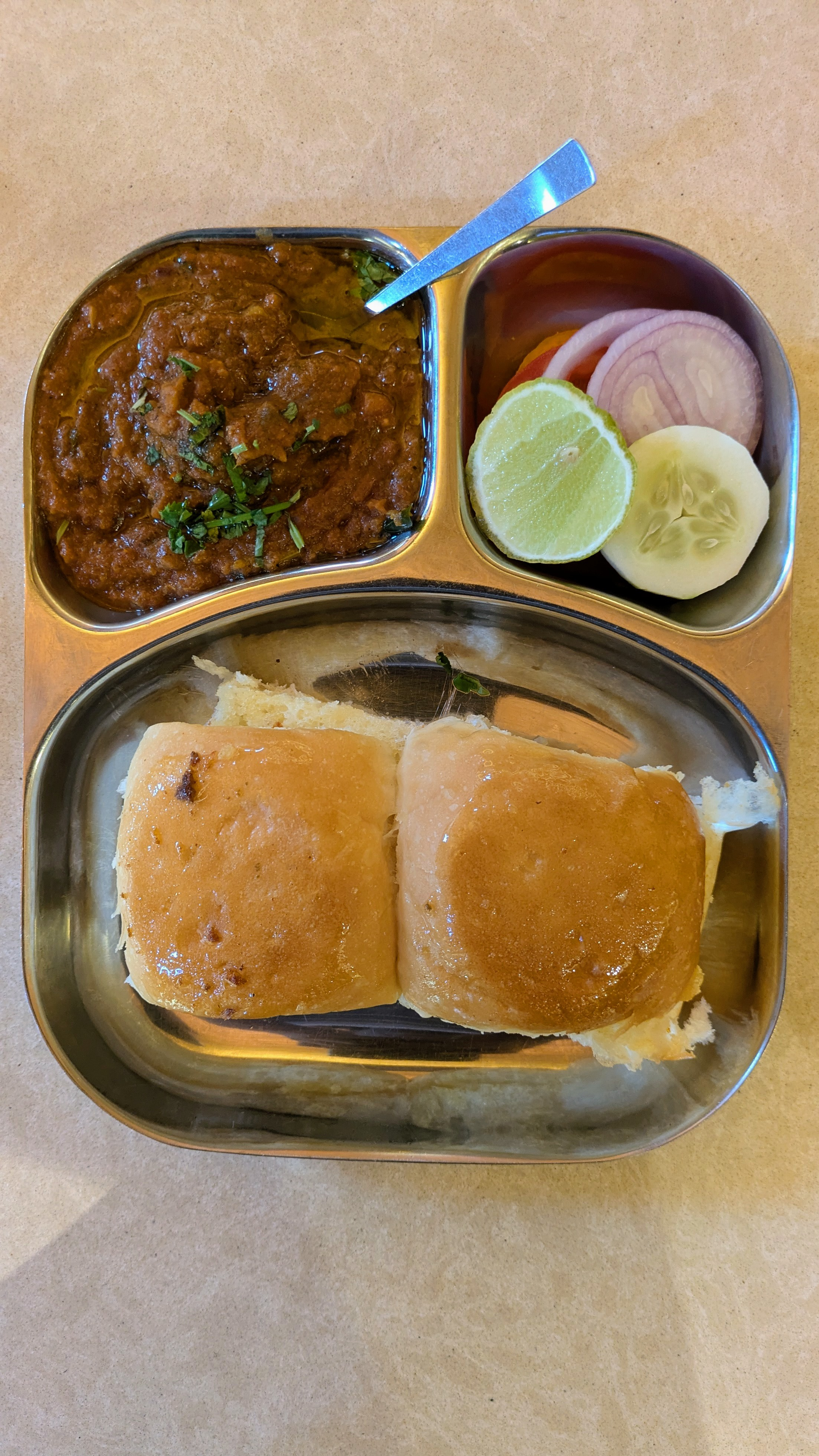
Pav bhaji

The dish originated as a fast lunchtime dish for textile mill workers in Mumbai. Pav bhaji was later served at restaurants throughout the city. Pav bhaji is now offered at outlets from simple hand carts to formal restaurants in India and abroad.

== Preparation ==
Pav bhaji is a spiced mixture of mashed vegetables in a thick gravy( Called "Bhaji" ) served with bread. Vegetables in the thick curry commonly include potatoes, onions, chili peppers, green peas, bell peppers, and tomatoes. It is usually cooked the curry on a flat griddle ( called Tawa) with a lot of butter and served hot. The Pav is slightly roasted over the hot Tawa with lot of molten butter almost soaking the bread. Finished Pav Bhaji ( Gravy and Bread ) is garnished with coriander and served with a lump of butter over hot bhaji.

== Variants ==
Variations on pav bhaji include:

- Cheese pav bhaji, with cheese on top of the bhaji
- Fried pav bhaji, with the pav tossed in the bhaji
- Paneer pav bhaji, with paneer in the bhaji
- Mushroom pav bhaji, with mushrooms in the bhaji
- Khada pav bhaji, in which vegetables are in chunks rather than mashed
- Jain pav bhaji, without onions and garlic and with plantains instead of potatoes
- Sada pav which only consists of pav
- Sada bhaji which only consists of bhaji
- Kolhapuri pav bhaji, using a spice mix common in Kolhapur
- Masala pav bhaji, with garam masala in the bhaji
- Beetroot pav bhaji, adding beetroot to the classic pav bhaji
- Chinese pav bhaji, using ingredients used in Chinese dishes such as Vinegar, soy sauce
- Moong sprouts bhaji, pav bhaji with moong sprouts
