= Usal =

Maharastrian dish

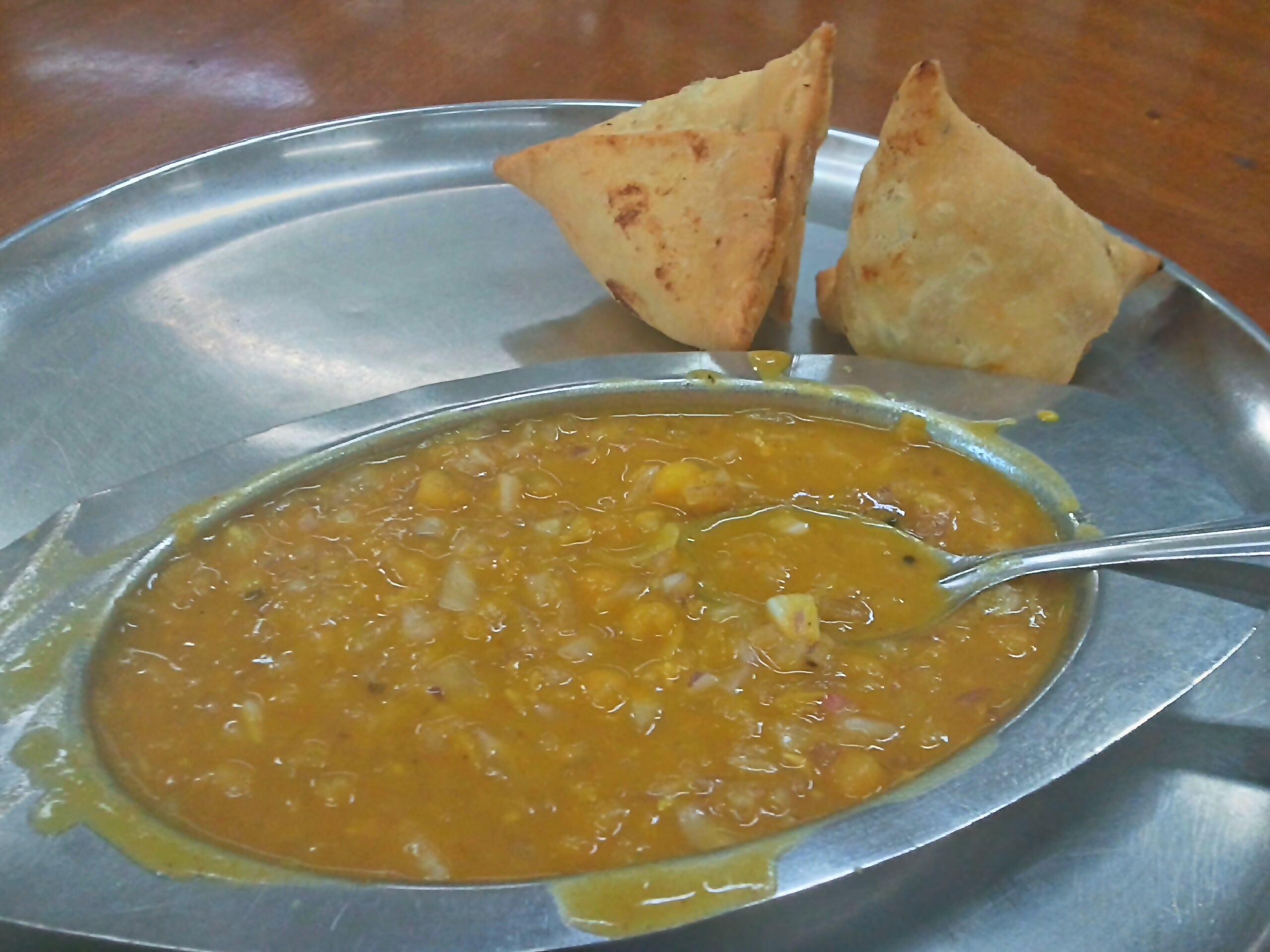
- Usal
- Place of origin: India
- Region or state: Maharashtra
- Main ingredients: Lentils

Usaḷ or Ūsaḷ (Marathi: ऊसळ) is a dish from the Indian state of Maharashtra. It is made of legumes such as peas, lentils, black-eyed beans, matki (moth bean), moong (green gram) or Hyacinth beans. Generally, the beans are soaked in water and allowed to sprout for a day or two. The sprouted beans are stir-fried along with onions, spices and curry leaves in oil. A little water is added to cook the sprouts. It usually has a thick gravy-like consistency. The use of spices varies according to the sprouts used, and according to taste.

== See also ==
- Misal
