= List of Indian dishes =

This is a list of Indian dishes. Many of the dishes on this list are made all across India. Indian cuisine encompasses a wide variety of regional cuisine native to India. Given the range of diversity in soil type, climate and occupations, these cuisines vary significantly from each other and use locally available ingredients such as: herbs, vegetables and fruits. The dishes are then served according to taste in either mild, medium or hot. Indian food is also heavily influenced by religious and cultural choices. Some Indian dishes are common in more than one region of India, with many vegetarian and vegan dishes. Some ingredients commonly found in Indian dishes include: rice, wheat, ginger, garlic, green chillies and spices.

== North-East India ==
The North-East of India includes Assam, Manipur, Meghalaya, Mizoram, Nagaland, Sikkim, Tripura and Arunachal Pradesh.

Name	Image	Description	Vegetarian/ Non-Vegetarian
Machher Jhol		Fish with potol, tomato, chillies, ginger and garlic from Assam	Non-Vegetarian
Pork jarpaa jurpie		Boiled pork with onions, chillies, ginger and garlic from Tripura	Non-Vegetarian
Chak-Hao Kheer		Purple rice porridge from Manipur	Vegetarian
Galho		Galho is similar to khichdi, a dish made from rice and also lentils and also popular in the most parts of North East India	Vegetarian

== North India ==
Name	Image	Description	Vegetarian/ Non-Vegetarian
Achari baingan		Brinjal cooked with pickle spices in gravy	Vegetarian
Aloo gobi		Cauliflower with potatoes sautéed with garam masala, turmeric, sometimes kalonji and curry leaves.	Vegetarian
Aloo tikki		Patties of potato mixed with some vegetables fried	Vegetarian
Aloo tuk		Double fried potatoes tossed in spices	Vegetarian
Aloo matar		Potatoes and peas in curry	Vegetarian
Aloo kulcha		Mildly leavened flatbread stuffed with potatoes	Vegetarian
Aloo methi		Sautéed potatoes (aloo) and chopped fenugreek leaves (methi) with chopped onions, garlic, and a blend of spices such as cumin, coriander, turmeric, and chili powder.	Vegetarian
Aloo shimla mirch		Green capsicum with potatoes sautéed with cumin seeds, onions, tomatoes, ginger-garlic paste, turmeric, red chilli powder and garam masala	Vegetarian
Baati		Hard, unleavened bread cooked in most of areas of Rajasthan, and in some parts of Madhya Pradesh, and Gujarat states of India.	Vegetarian
Bhatura		A fluffy deep-fried leavened bread originating from the Indian subcontinent.	Vegetarian
Bhindi masala		Okra sautéed with onions and tomatoes	Vegetarian
Biryani		Mixed rice dish, optional spices, optional vegetables, meats or seafood. Can be served with plain yogurt.	Non-Vegetarian
Butter chicken, murgh mahal		Chicken in a mildly spiced tomato sauce.	Non-Vegetarian
Chaat		Usually containing potato patty fried in oil, topped with sweet yogurt, and other sauces and spices	Vegetarian, Street food.
Chana masala		Chickpeas of the Chana type in tomato based sauce.	Vegetarian
Chapati		Unleavened flatbread originating from the Indian subcontinent and staple in India, Nepal, Bangladesh, Pakistan, Sri Lanka, East Africa and the Caribbean.	Vegetarian
Chicken rezala		Bhopali style chicken cooked in a rich gravy with mint	Non-Vegetarian
Chicken Tikka		Chicken with spices served on a skewer	Non-Vegetarian
Chicken tikka masala		Chicken marinated in a Yogurt tomato sauce. It is known to have a creamy texture.	Non-Vegetarian
Chole bhature		Main course with chickpeas, assorted spices, wheat flour and bhatura yeast.	Vegetarian
Daal baati churma		A Rajasthani specialty	Vegetarian
Dal fara			Vegetarian
Dal makhani (kali dal)		Lentils in a creamy and aromatic sauce made of butter, tomato sauce, and a blend of spices	Vegetarian
Dalpuri		Stuffed dal in parathas	Vegetarian
Dal tadka		Typical north Indian tadka	Vegetarian
Dum aloo		Potatoes cooked in curry	Vegetarian
Poha		Specialty from Madhya Pradesh. Common snack in central part of India. Flattened rice, potato, turmeric.	Vegetarian
Fara		Stuffed Lentil Dumplings	Vegetarian
Aloo Phalliyaan		Diced French beans with potatoes cooked with chopped onions, tomatoes sautéed with cumin seeds, green chillies and garam masala	Vegetarian
Gajar Pak		Sweet dish made using carrot, milk, ghee, dry fruits.	Vegetarian
Gatte ki Sabzi		Gatte (made up of besan) are added to spice gravy made of curd.	
Gajar matar aloo		Diced red/orange carrots and potatoes sautéed with black mustard leaves, garnished with ground black pepper powder and lemon juice	Vegetarian
Gobhi matar		Cauliflower in a tomato sauce	Vegetarian
Hari mutter ka nimona (green peas daal)		a Typical north Indian tadka	Vegetarian
Imarti		spherically meshed sweet dish from North India made up of batter from moong dal dipped in sugary syrup	Vegetarian
Imarti with rabri		Dessert made by combining imarti with rabri.	Vegetarian
Jalebi		A North Indian twisted noodle like sweet dish dipped in sugary syrup	Vegetarian
Jaleba		A bigger form of jalebi	Vegetarian
Jalfrezi		Meat and spices fried in a pan. Can be vegetarian as well.	Vegetarian
Kachori		Rajasthani / Marwari special	Vegetarian
Kadai paneer		Paneer and green peppers in tomato gravy	Vegetarian
Kadhi pakoda		Gram flour with yogurt with gramflour fried balls	Vegetarian
Karela bharta		a bitter gourd or melon dish	Usually vegetarian
Katha meetha petha / kaddu halwa		Pumpkin cooked in spices	Vegetarian
Kheer		Rice cooked with milk and dry fruits	Vegetarian
Khichdi		Rice cooked with daal and veggies and sauteed	Vegetarian
Kadhi and Khichdi		Khichdi mixed with kadhi, found mostly in Gujarat. Also referred to as khichdi and kadhi, khichdi-kadhi, and kadhi-khichdi.	Vegetarian
Khoya paneer		cube of paneer cheese in a gravy made of thickened milk (khoya), onion, garlic, ginger, tomato and spices	Vegetarian
Kofta		Gram flour balls fried with vegetables. Gram flour, veggies, rolled into balls with gram flour and fried in oil and then cooked with curry.	Vegetarian
Kulfi falooda		dessert to ward off sweltering heat of summers	Vegetarian
Laapsi		Dessert made up of broken wheat	Vegetarian
Lauki ke kofte		a way to serve bottle gourd	Vegetarian
Lauki ki bhaaji		a way to serve bottle gourd	Vegetarian
Litti chokha		A baked salted wheat flour cake filled with sattu (baked chickpea flour) and some special spices	Vegetarian
Lobiya		Black eyes peas, onions and tomatoes in a curry sauce	Vegetarian
Makhaan ka kheer		Sweet, made up with makhana, milk, sugar, cashew and other savor. Popular in Mithilanchal region of Bihar	Vegetarian
Makki ki roti, sarson ka saag		Creamed sarson mustard leaves, with heavily buttered roti made from corn flour. North Indian winter favorite.	Vegetarian
Matar paneer		green peas and cube of paneer cheese in a spiced tomato-based sauce	Vegetarian
Mathura peda		a sort of a confection	Vegetarian
Methi saag, chaulai saag		Veggie leaves sauteed in oil and garlic with little masalas. Cooked mostly in central part of India.	Vegetarian
Millet Lapsi		Roasted Millet cooked in Jaggery	Vegetarian
Mirchi bada		Green Chili stuffed with mashed potato, coated with besan batter and fried, it is native to Jodhpur.	Vegetarian
Missi roti		Whole wheat & gram flour dough ground masalas, pan fried	Vegetarian
Mixed vegetable		mixed vegetables, slow cooked with a tomato sauce added.	Vegetarian
Moong dal ki Lapsi		a dish made with yellow lentils, milk, sugar, and nuts	Vegetarian Dessert
Murgh musallam			Non-Vegetarian
Mushroom do pyaza (Kanda Khumb)		Mushrooms & Onions in a tomato masala sauce spiced with chilles	Vegetarian
Mushroom matar (Matar Khumb)		Mushrooms and sweet peas in a masala or chili sauce	Vegetarian
Naan		Tandoor-baked soft flatbread made with refined wheat flour.	Vegetarian
Naan Khatai		Shortbread biscuits	Vegetarian
Navrattan korma		Vegetables, Nuts, Paneer cheese in a tomato cream sauce	Vegetarian
Pakhala		Cooked rice with water	Vegetarian
Palak paneer		fresh spinach leaves (palak) cooked with cubes of paneer cheese in a rich and creamy tomato-based sauce	Vegetarian
Paneer butter masala, paneer makhani		curry made with soft cubes of paneer cheese in a creamy and aromatic sauce made of butter, tomato sauce, and a blend of spices	Vegetarian
Paneer tikka masala		vegetarian alternative to chicken tikka masala, with paneer instead of chicken	Vegetarian
Pani puri		a typical Indian tadka	Vegetarian
Panjeeri		a mixture of butter, dried fruits and whole wheat flour served as a dessert.	Vegetarian
Papad		A crispy add on to Lunch and Dinner, for adding a spicy and crunchier taste to food.	Vegetarian
Paratha		flatbread native to the Indian subcontinent, prevalent throughout the modern-day nations of India, Sri Lanka, Pakistan, Nepal, Bangladesh, Maldives, and Myanmar, where wheat is the traditional staple	Vegetarian
Patrode		A steamed vegetarian dish made from colocasia leaves (chevu in Tulu, taro, kesuve or arbi)	Vegetarian
Phirni		Sweet rice pudding, cooked in milk, flavoured with cardamom, saffron, and rose water, and garnished with nuts like almonds and pistachios.	Vegetarian
Pinni		A type of Punjabi and North Indian cuisine dish that is eaten mostly in winters. It is served as a dessert and is made from desi ghee, wheat flour, jaggery and almonds. Raisins may also be used.	Vegetarian
Rajma		Main. Kidney beans & assorted spices.	Vegetarian
Ramatori bhaaji		a spicy side dish made with any two vegetables i.e. potatoes and cabbage	Vegetarian
Samosa		Normally served as an entree or appetiser. Potatoes, onions, peas, coriander, and lentils, may be served with a mint or tamarind sauce	Vegetarian/meat varieties
Sattu ki roti		a dish from Bihar	Vegetarian
Shahi paneer or Rajwadi Chhena/Paneer		A popular Indian as well as Nepalese dish, made with chhena or paneer in a thick cream and tomato gravy that is sweeter and spicier than paneer makhani	Vegetarian
Shahi tukra		A bread pudding in a rich gravy of thickened milk, garnished with sliced almonds	Vegetarian
Singhada Lapsi		Lotus fruit dried and powdered to make this fasting sweet meat	Vegetarian
Sooji halwa (Suji Lapsi)		Semolina cooked with clarified butter and dry fruits. Semolina (Suji), clarified butter, cashew nuts.	Vegetarian
Sweet pethas / kesar petha / pista petha		A ravioli like dessert stuffed with a choice of fillings and equally popular in various parts of India and Pakistan	Vegetarian
Talit Macchi		Fried fish made with curry, ginger, and garlic	Non-Vegetarian
Tamatar Chaat	Tamatar Chaat Recipe in Hindi	Tamatar Chaat is an Indian street food which is most popular in north India specially in Varanasi.	Vegetarian
Tandoori Chicken		Tandoori chicken as a dish originated in the Punjab before the independence of India and Pakistan.	Non-Vegetarian
Tandoori Fish Tikka		Fish marinated in lime and ginger and cooked over an open fire.	Non-Vegetarian

== South India ==
Name	Image	Description	Vegetarian/ Non-Vegetarian	Dish Type
Ananas menaskai		Pineapple cooked in jaggery and tamarind gravy	Vegetarian	
Attu		Several types are made with several type of flours including rice flour, urad dal, semolina and wheat flour. This is the name of it in Andhra Pradesh which is also called Dosa. Attu is coarse than Dosa.	Vegetarian	
Kesari bat		Roasted flat rice flour cooked with sugar and dry fruits.	Vegetarian	
Avial		Coconut paste, curd mixed with vegetables and some spices.	Vegetarian	Accompaniment with Staple food
Baida roti		fried minced chicken stuffed in Egg roll	Non Vegetarian	Snacks
Halwa		Maida or Sugarcane fritters which are known as Halwa in South India	Vegetarian	Sweet/Dessert
Bhaji		Vegetable or onion fritters which are known as Pakodas in North India and Pakistani cuisine	Vegetarian	Snack/ meal accompaniment
Biryani		Spicy rice dish with vegetables or chicken or mutton or fish or prawns.	Depends on choice	
Bisi bele bath		Rice preparation with vegetables.	Vegetarian	main course
Bonda		Potatoes, gram flour.	Vegetarian	Snack
Chettinadu Chicken		Dish made chicken and spices	Non-Vegetarian	
Chicken 65		Popular deep fried chicken preparation. Chicken, onion, ginger	Non-Vegetarian	
Currivepillai sadam (Tamil Nadu)		Curry leaves and rice	Vegetarian	Breakfast dish
Dibba rotti		It is a breakfast item made in Andhra pradesh and is also called Minaparotti. Made with rice, urad dal. Tastes good with a chutney.	Vegetarian	
Dosa		Pancake/Hopper. Ground rice, urad dal	Vegetarian	Breakfast dish
Double ka meetha		Bread crumbs fried in ghee and dipped in milk and sugar syrup	Sweet	
Ennai kathrikkai kozhambu		deep-fried eggplants in a tamarind gravy	Vegetarian	side dish/accompaniment
Goli bajje		a snack with Gram flour.	Vegetarian	
Golichina Mamsam		A simple yet fiery mutton dish that goes well with either rice or paratha.	Non-Vegetarian	Main Course
Hyderabadi biryani		Biryani cooked in hyderabadi style	Non vegetarian	
Idiyappam		Steamed rice noodles or vermicelli with Ground rice	Vegetarian	
Idli		Steamed cake of fermented rice and pulse flour. Rice, urad dal	Vegetarian	
Indian omelette		Egg omelette or veg omelette		
Kaara kozhambu (Tamil Nadu)		a dish used with rice made of chilli powder and tamarind	Vegetarian	
Kanji		a rice porridge	Vegetarian	
Keerai koottu (Tamil Nadu)		Green leaves kootu	Vegetarian	
Keerai masiyal		Ground green leaves used as a side dish for rice or mixed with rice.	Vegetarian	
Keerai poriyal		Green leaves mixed with daal and coconut with little oil	Vegetarian	
Keerai sadam (Tamil Nadu)		Rice and green leaves	Vegetarian	
Kerala Beef Fry		Beef, onions, spices, coconut, curry leaves	Non-vegetarian	
Kodubale		mixture rice flour, soji, shredded coconut, red chillies, cumin*, salt in the shape of a ring fried in oil	Vegetarian	Snack
kolhapuri akkha masoor Dal		whole Red lentil cooked in onion gravy with Massala	vegetarian	
Koottu		Vegetable, daal or lentil mixture boiled in water	Vegetarian	
Kori rotti				
Kos kootu		a cabbage and lentil dish used for rice	Vegetarian	
Koshambri		A cucumber salad dish popular in Karnataka. Prepared during festivals.	Vegetarian	Salad
Kothamali sadam		Coriander rice	Vegetarian	Breakfast dish
Kuzhakkattai		Dumplings with Rice flour, jaggery, and coconut	Vegetarian	Snack
Kuzhambu		Thick soup with coconut and vegetables	Vegetarian	
Masala Dosa		Dosa with masala and potato.	Vegetarian	Breakfast
Nandu omelette		an omelette with pieces of crab and spices	Non-Vegetarian	
Obbattu (holige, bobbattu, pooran-poli)		A stuffed (moong gram dal and jaggery or coconut poornam) paratha. Dish native to South and West India in the states of |- Karnataka, Andhra Pradesh and Maharashtra || Vegetarian|| Festival Sweet dish		
Olan (dish)		Light and subtle-flavored Kerala dish prepared from white gourd, ash-gourd or black-eyed peas, coconut milk and ginger seasoned with coconut oil.	Vegetarian	
Pachadi		Side dish made with yoghurt, coconut, ginger and curry leaves and seasoned with mustard.	Vegetarian	accompaniment
Paniyaram, Paddu, Gunthapangnalu		a dish made of rice flour and black gram	Vegetarian	Breakfast
Papadum		Thin deep fried disk served as meal accompaniment	Vegetarian	Fryums accompaniment
Paravannam		A delicious sweet dish made with Rice, jaggery made in Andhra pradesh.	Vegetarian	
Parotta		a layered kerala parotta made with maida and dalda.	Vegetarian	
Paruppu sadam		Daal rice		
Payasam		Rice dessert. Rice, milk.	Vegetarian	
Pesarattu		Dosa (pancake or crepe) of Andhra Pradesh made from moong dal (lentils), grains and spice batter.	Vegetarian	
Pongal		Pulao	Vegetarian	Breakfast dish
Poriyal		Side dish for rice prepared from one or more vegetables. Oil stirred, with daal half boiled and coconut / mustard seeds.	Vegetarian	accompaniment
Puli sadam, Puliogre, Puliohara		Tamarind rice	Vegetarian	Breakfast dish
Puttu		Ground rice, jaggery, cardamom powder, mixed and steam cooked	Vegetarian	Breakfast/Snack
Ragi mudhe, Kali		A lump of finger millet, flour and water. After cooking, made up as little balls, can be dipped in Chutney/Sambar	Vegetarian	Part of meal/lunch
Rasam		A spicy and sour soup usually made with tamarind, tomatoes, pepper and other south Indian spices. Usually eaten with rice.	Vegetarian	Part of lunch
Sajjige		a sweet dish	Vegetarian	Dessert
Sakkara pongal		a sweet rice dish	Vegetarian	Festival Sweet dish
Sambar		Lentil soup cooked with vegetables and a blend of south Indian spices (masala). Usually taken with rice, idli, dosa, pongal or upma.	Vegetarian	
Sandige, Vattral		Deep fried meal accompaniment made with rice, sago and ash gourd	Vegetarian	Fryums-accompaniment
Sevai		Kind of rice vermicelli mixed with either tamarind or lemon or coconut.	Vegetarian	breakfast or lunch
Sponge dosa		dosa made of fermented poha and rice	Vegetarian	
Thattai		Type of puri made with rice, gram, urad dal flour	Vegetarian	
Thayir sadam, mosaranna, perugannam		a curd rice dish	Vegetarian	
Theeyal		Kerala sauce made from a mixture of spices consisting of roasted coconut, coriander seeds, tamarind water, dried red chili and fenugreek.	Vegetarian	
Thengai sadam		a coconut rice dish	Vegetarian	Breakfast dish
Uttapam Tamil Nadu		Rice pancake/hopper with a topping of onions / tomatoes / coconut	Vegetarian	Breakfast dish
Vada		Savory donut. Urad dal.	Vegetarian	accompaniment
Varuval		Vegetables fried in shallow oil	Vegetarian	accompaniment
Wheat upma, Uppittu		A breakfast dish and snack. Upma prepared from wheat dhalia rava.	Vegetarian	Breakfast dish
Yelumicham sadam, chitranna		Rice with lemon juice	Vegetarian	Breakfast dish

== West India ==
Name	Image	Description	Vegetarian/ Non-Vegetarian
Amti		a Lentil curry with Split lentils.	
Bajri no rotlo		Bread made with thick millet flour flatbread usually grilled over coals.	Vegetarian
Batata Saung		potato in chilli tamarind gravy.	Vegetarian
Barfi		Sweet	Vegetarian Desert
Basundi		Sweet made from milk by continuous heating to a point before condensing.	Vegetarian Desert
Bhakri		Whole wheat flour bread, thicker than rotli, crispy.	
Bombil fry		Main Course; Bombay Duck (Fish).	Non-Vegetarian
Chaat		Snack	Vegetarian
Chevdo		Mixture of Flattened rice, groundnut, chana, masala.	
Cholafali		snack	
Chorafali		Spicy. Ground chana dal and urad dal, deep fried flattened disk, masala, sprinkle with red chili powder on top.	
Daal Dhokli		Daal Dhokli is widely cooked and eaten all over Rajasthan and Gujarat. Very small dumplings of wheat flour are cooked along with green gram or pegeon dal and whole red chili and red mustard is used as tempering.	Vegetarian
Dabeli	Kutchi dabeli	Snack made by mixing boiled potatoes with a special dabeli masala, putting the mixture in a ladi pav	Vegetarian
Dahi vada		Fried lentil balls in a yogurt sauce. Lentils, yogurt.	Vegetarian
Dalithoy		Soup made with split yellow lentils.	Vegetarian
Dhokla		Lentil snack. Gram.	Vegetarian
Doodhpak		A milk-based sweet dessert with nuts	
Dudhi no halwo		Sweet. Bottle gourd halwa	
dudhi muthiya		snack made up of refined wheat and bottle gourd	Vegetarian
Dum aaloo		Main dish. Potatoes deep fry, yogurt, coriander powder, ginger powder.	Vegetarian
Gajar halwo		Sweet. Carrot Halwa	
Gatta curry		Curry with steamed dumplings made from chickpea flour cooked in a spiced yoghurt sauce.	Vegetarian
Ghari (sweet from Surat)		Sweet	
Ghooghra		Sweet	
Gud papdi (Gol papdi)		Sweet	
Gulab jamun		Sweet	
Halvasan		Sweet	
Handwo (steamed dish)		Snack	
Gur		Sweet unrefined brown sugar sold in blocks[3].	
Jalebi		Sweet maida & grained semolina flour, baking powder, curd, sugar.	Sweet
Jeera Aloo		Typical West Indian dish	Vegetarian
Juvar no rotlo		Thick sorghum flatbread.	
Kansar		Sweet	
Karanji		A crispy sweet dish from Maharashtra	Vegetarian Desert
Keri no ras		Sweet	
Khakhra		Gujarati Snack. Wheat flour, methi.	
Khandvi		Snack. Besan.	
Kombdi vade		Chicken Curry with Bread. Chicken.	
Kopra paak		Sweet coconut halwa/barfi: Halwa is soft, barfi more like cake.	
Koshimbir		a salad, usually served as a side	
Kolim / Jawla		A preparation of dried fish named Kolim or Jawla found in coastal Maharashtra with onion and spices. Usually eaten with bhakri or chapati	
Laapsi		Sweet coarse ground/ broken wheat cooked with butter and sugar.	
Laddu		Sweet	
Locha		Surat (Gujarat) special Spicy dish. Ground chanadal, masala.	
Malpua		Sweet	
Methi na Gota		Snack. Fried fenugreek dumplings.	
Modak		A Marathi sweet dish made of steamed rice flour with coconut and jaggery filling	Vegetarian Desert
Mohanthal		a sweet prepared from gram flour and ghee dry fruits	
Chakri (chakali)		a Savoury snack. Mixed grain flour.	Vegetarian
Muthiya		Gujarati Snack. Whole wheat flour, methi leaves, besan/chickpeas flour and coriander leaves/cilantro.	
Naralachi vadi / Khobryachi vadi / Coconut vadi		A sweet made of coconut and sugar syrup which is cooled and dried till it becomes firm. Usually made in konkan region	
Oondees		Breakfast delicacy. Spherical shaped rice or semolina about four inches (10 cm) in diameter.	
Panipuri		Snack	
Patra		Snack. Taro leaves, coconut, seeds, dal.	
Pav Bhaji		Mixed curry of onion, capsicum, peas, cauliflower potatoes.	
Penda		Sweet	
Poha		Snack. Flattened rice	Vegetarian
Pooran-poli		Sweet stuffed bread. Wheat flour, gram.	
Poori		Bread. Wheat flour.	
Puri Bhaji		Breakfast or Snack	
Rasya muthia		Snack. A spicy yogurt dumpling soup.	
Sabudana Khichadi		Vegetarian Snack. Sago.	
Saath		A chewy plain flat circular sweet made of dried mango (sometimes jackfruit) juice/pulp. Usually made in Konkan region of Maharashtra ||	
Sev khamani		Chana dal, green chillies, ginger, lemon juice and olive oil.	
Sev tameta		Veggis with potatoes and sev.	
Shakarpara		A deep fried snack made out of sugar and wheat.	
Namakpara		Snack. A deep fried snack made out of salt and Gram Flour .	
Shankarpali		Sweet or savoury snack. Plain flour, sugar.	
Shiro		Sweet roasted semolina/flour/dal with milk, butter, sugar, nuts and raisins.	
Shrikhand		A thick yogurt-based sweet dessert garnished with ground nuts, cardamom, and saffron.	
Sohan papdi		Sweet	
Soonvali		Snack	
Sukhdi		Sweet	
Surnoli		Pancakes that have holes. are yellow and puffy. They are about 10 inches (25 centimeters) in diameter and often served with butter.	
Sutarfeni		Sweet	
Thalipeeth		Savoury pancake. Mixed grain flour.	
Thepla		Paratha. Mixed grain flour.	
Undhiyu		Mix veggi. Plantain, brinjal, carrot, green chillies, potatoes, fresh coconut and other vegetables. Gujarati food.	
Upmaa		a dish originating from the Indian subcontinent, cooked as a thick porridge from dry-roasted semolina or coarse rice flour.	
Vada pav		Burger. Gram flour, potatoes, chilli, garlic, ginger.	
Veg Kolhapuri		Mixed vegetables.	
Vindaloo		Goan pork vindaloo. Pork, goan red chilli paste.	Non-Vegetarian
Ghebar or Ghevar		Sweet from Surat	
Lilva Kachori		Snack. Lilva and whole wheat flour.	
Maghaz			
Undhiyu		The signature winter Gujarati dish. Curry of mixed vegetables like surti papdi, ratalu, potatoes, carrot, green garlic, tuvar dana, waal dana etc. rich in oil and spices generally accompanied by puri or roti.	
Mag Dhokli		an Indian dish made of lentils and fresh dough with Indian spices, it is dry and not liquidy like daal dhokli.	
Khichu		It is made by boiling the rice flour in water with seasoning, subtle in taste and accompanied by oil and methi masala.	
Thepla		A signature Gujarati snack which is a parantha with seasoning, made from wheat flour, this dish is generally accompanied by condiments like pickles, green chillies, etc. It is also known as Dhebra, Chopda etc. in various regions.	
Farsi Puri		It is a Gujarati snack which is also known as mathri in other regions of India, it generally made from wheat flour, all purpose flour etc.	
Khaman		Made by steaming gram flour batter with flavorful seasoning accompanied with chutney.	
Turiya Patra Vatana sabji		A vegetable curry made generally in winters.	
Mohanthal		A sweet dish.	
Churma Ladoo		A sweet dish made with wheat flour, ghee, sugar or jaggery and dry fruits.	
Zunka or Jhunka or Pitla		A dish made of besan (gram flour) with minced onion, green chilies, and coriander (cilantro) . Usually eaten with bhakri or chapati.	

== East India ==
Name	Image	Description	Vegetarian/ Non-Vegetarian
Cheera Doi		A breakfast cereal; a Bengali speciality.	Vegetarian
Daab chingri		Prawn curry cooked in green coconut.	Non-vegetarian
Dhup Pitha		A sweet Assamese speciality.	Sweet
Gheela Pitha		A sweet Assamese speciality.	Sweet
Hurum		A breakfast cereal; an Assamese speciality.	Vegetarian
Khar		An Assamese speciality side dish: papaya, banana & soda	Vegetarian
Kumol Sawul		A breakfast cereal; an Assamese speciality: soft rice with cream & jaggery.	Vegetarian
Loskora (Coconut Laddu)		Sweet	Vegetarian
Luchi		A Puffed bread, fried in oil, made from flour. A Bengali speciality.	Vegetarian
Malpua/Malpoa		Sweet snacks notable in Northeast and East India, specially in Odisha.	Sweet
Momo		Originally from Tibet, it is a popular snack/ food item in India specially within Indo-Nepalese community.	
Muri Naaru		A sweet Bengali specialty.	
Pani Tenga		a pickled dish made from mustard.	
Sunga Pitha		A Sweet Assamese specialty	
Alu Pitika		a dish made of mashed potato.	
Masor tenga		An Assamese fish stew cooked with any of a variety of sour fruits including tomatoes.	
Bengena Pitika		A dish made of mashed brinjal.	
Bilahi Maas		A fish curry cooked with tomatoes.	
Black rice		A special local variety of rice	
Bora Sawul		A breakfast cereal; an Assamese specialty. Sticky rice, sugar or jaggery.	
Brown Rice		A special local variety of rice.	
Chhenagaja		Odia Dessert. Cottage cheese, flour, sugar syrup.	
Chhenapoda		Dessert. Cottage cheese, flour, sugar syrup. Odia Specialty.	
Chingri malai curry		Curry. Prawn, coconut, mustard, steamed. Traditional Bengali Dish.	Non-vegetarian
Dal		Lentils.	Vegetarian
Goja		A sweet Bengali speciality.	
Hando Guri		A breakfast cereal; an Assamese speciality.	
Haq Maas		A Fish curry cooked with leafy green vegetables.	Non-vegetarian
Horioh Maas		A Golden Mustard Fish Curry.	Non-vegetarian
Ilish or Chingri Bhape		Curry. Ilish (Hilsha fish) or prawn, coconut, mustard, steamed. Traditional Bengali Dish.	Non-vegetarian
Kabiraji		A popular non-vegetarian Indian dish in Eastern India prepared using chicken and fish	
Kharoli		Pickle made from mustard; an Assamese specialty	
Khorisa		Pickle made from bamboo shoot; an Assamese specialty	
Koldil Chicken		Chicken cooked with banana flower; an Assamese specialty	
Koldil Duck		Duck meat cooked with banana flower; an Assamese specialty	
Konir Dom		Egg curry.	
Lai Haq Maas		Fish Curry with herbs & lemon.	
Litti		Balls of wheat and sattu baked in oven and served with mashed potatoes (Chokha)	
Maasor Tenga		Tomato Fish Curry.	
Machher Jhol		A curry of fish, and various spices.	
Masor Koni		A fish delicacy.	
Masor Petu		A fish delicacy.	
Mishti Chholar Dal		A curry with Bengal gram, coconut, and sugar. Bengali speciality.	
Mishti Doi		A dessert with curd, sugar syrup or jaggery. Bengali Sweet curd.	
Ou tenga Maas		A fish curry cooked with elephant apple.	
Pakhala		Odia dish with fermented rice, yoghurt, salt & seasonings.	
Bhaji		Fried Vegetables.	
Pani Pitha		An Assamese sweet speciality.	
Pantua		It is a traditional Bengali sweet made of deep-fried balls of semolina, chhena, milk, ghee and sugar syrup. Notable in West Bengal, Eastern India and Bangladesh.	
Payokh		Dessert	
Peda		Sweet	
Prawn malai curry		Curry. Prawns, coconut cream, crushed mustard seed, red chillies. Bengali dish.	
Red Rice		Special local variety of rice.	
Rice		Staple Food.	
Rasagola/Roshogolla		A sweet dessert using cottage cheese, flour and sugar syrup. Originated independently in different versions and taste in Odisha and West Bengal, Eastern India.	Sweet
Shondesh		A dessert with milk and sugar. A signature Bengali dish.	Sweet
Shukto		A Bengali cuisine. Diced potatoes, sweet potatoes, broad beans, eggplant, drumsticks, raw bananas, radish cooked together and sautéed with mustard seeds. This culinary cooked in mustard oil and sometimes shredded coconut can also be used.	
Sunga Pork		Rich spicy pork curry	
Tenga Doi		Sour curd	
Til Pitha		A sweet Assamese specialty. Rice powder, til, jaggery.	

=== Unsorted ===
- Bread pakora
- Dhoper chop
- Karela nu shak

== See also ==
- List of Indian breads
- List of Indian drinks
- List of Indian pickles
- List of Indian snacks
- List of Indian soups and stews
- List of Indian sweets and desserts
- Mutton curry
- Sattvic Diet
- Lacto vegetarianism
