= Prawn curry =

Prawn curry may refer to:

- Shrimp curry
- Chingri malai curry, type of prawn curry
- Chingudi Jhola. spicy gravy based prawn curry
- Daab Chingri, type of prawn curry, cooked and served in coconut
