= Marag =

Marag may refer to:

- Black pudding, a blood sausage
- Hyderabadi marag, a mutton soup
