= Kolhapuri (disambiguation) =

Kolhapuri is the adjective form of Kolhapur, a city in Maharashtra, India.

Kolhapuri may also refer to:

- Kolhapuri chappal, hand-crafted leather slippers
- Kolhapuri pheta, a traditional turban worn in Kolhapur
- Kolhapuri saaj, a type of necklace named after Kolhapur
- Veg kolhapuri, a vegetarian dish from Kolhapur
