= Punugulu =

Indian snack food

Punugulu పునుగులు
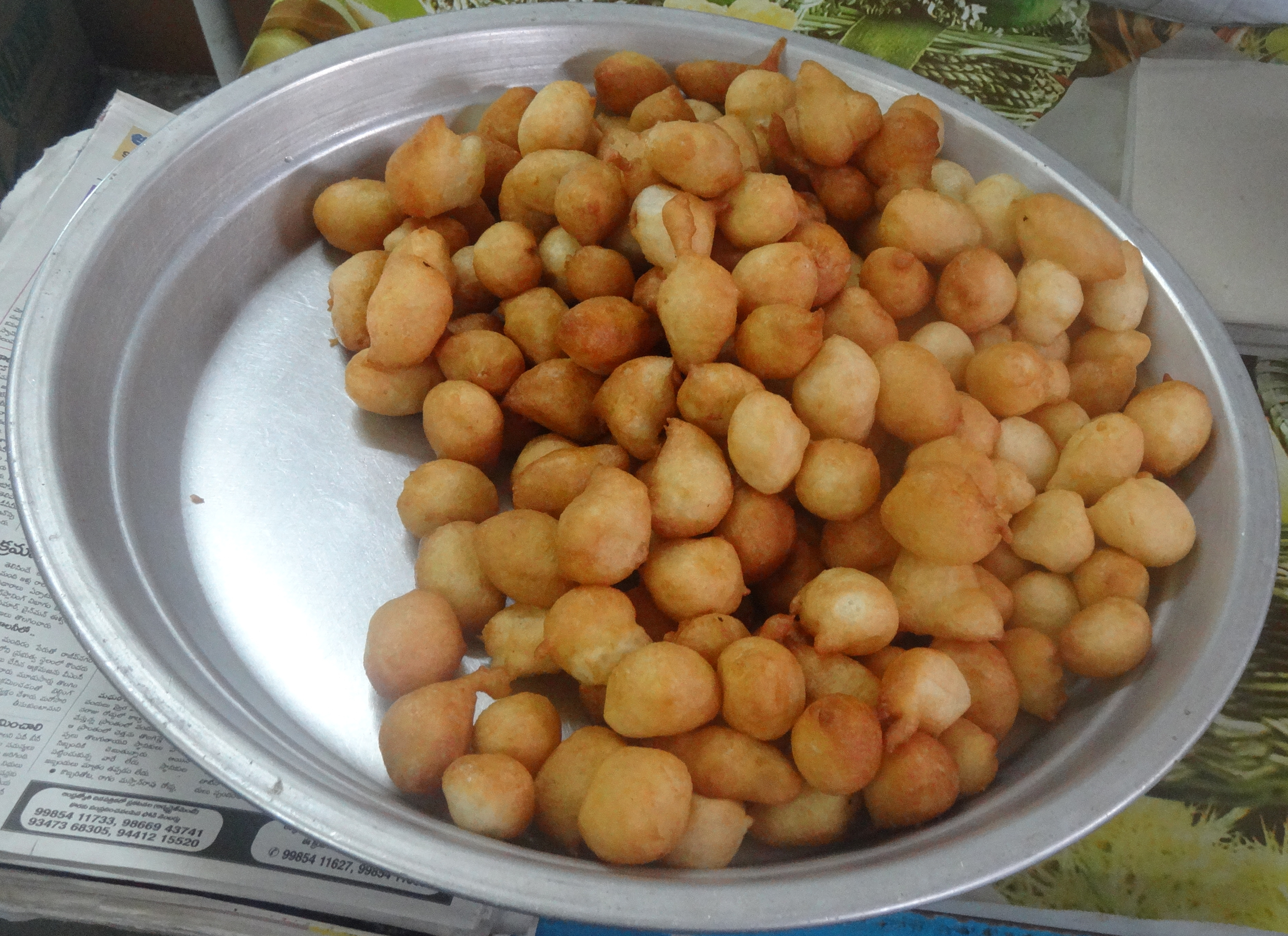
- Punugulu kept in a shop in West Godavari for sale
- Place of origin: South India
- Region or state: Andhra Pradesh
- Serving temperature: Hot
- Main ingredients: Rice batter

Punugulu (transl. పునుగులు) is a snack and common street food in Andhra Pradesh, India. Punugulu is a deep-fried snack made with rice, urad dal and other spices. They are often served with peanut chutney (known as palli chutney), coconut chutney, tomato chutney, verusanaga chutney or toordal chutney known as kandhi pachadi, or they can be served with capsicum peanut chutney. They are commonly seen all over Delta Andhra and in Hyderabad. It is sometimes incorrectly called punukulu.

== Preparation ==
Punugulu is prepared with the rice batter which is used to make idly and dosa. The batter may be fresh or fermented. Accordingly, the taste differs. First, oil is heated in a vessel for frying. Then, a small amount of batter is added to the oil and deep-fried. Punugulu is generally crispy outside and soft inside.

== Gallery ==
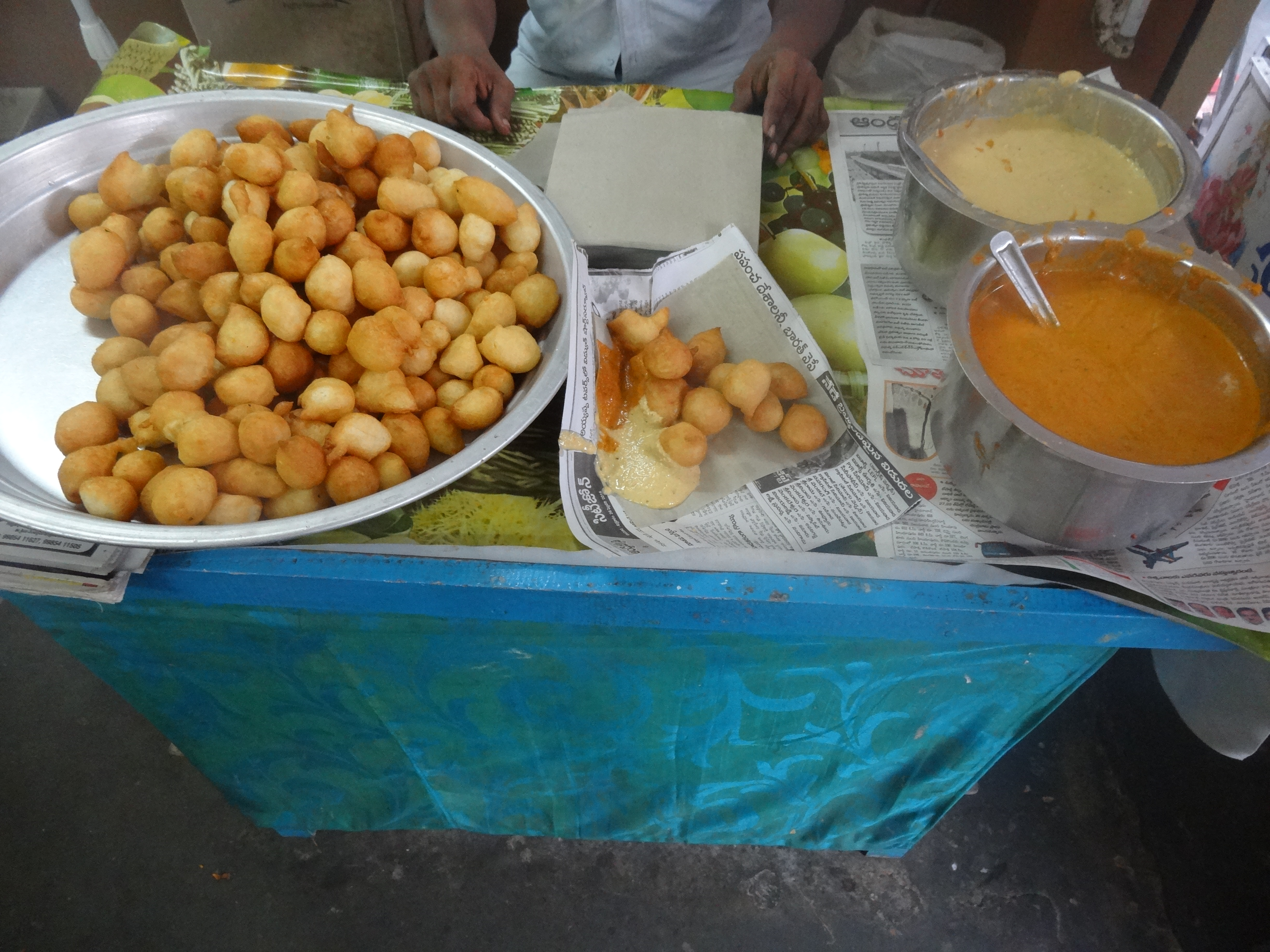
Punugulu served with coconut chutney and tomato chutney

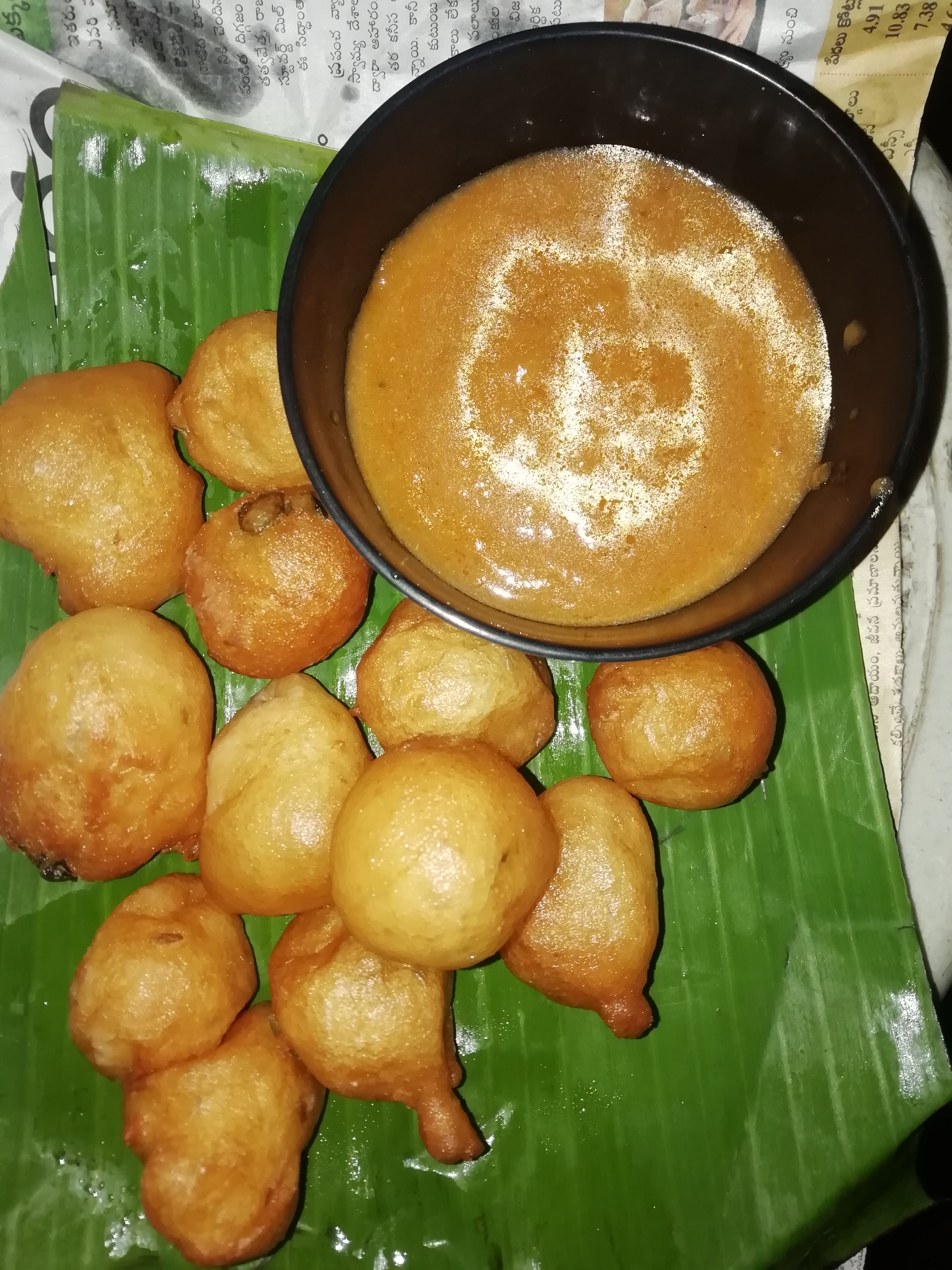

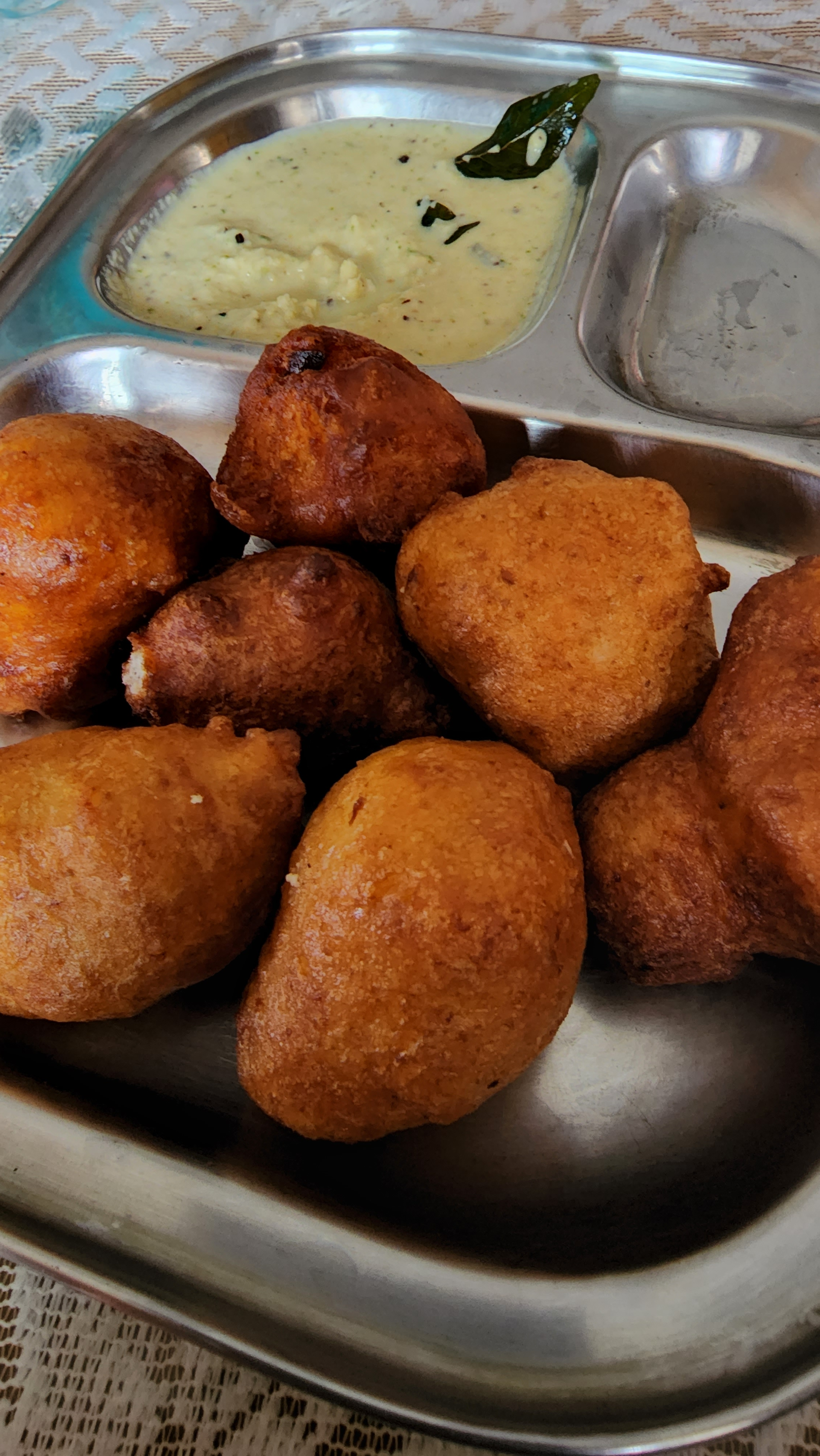

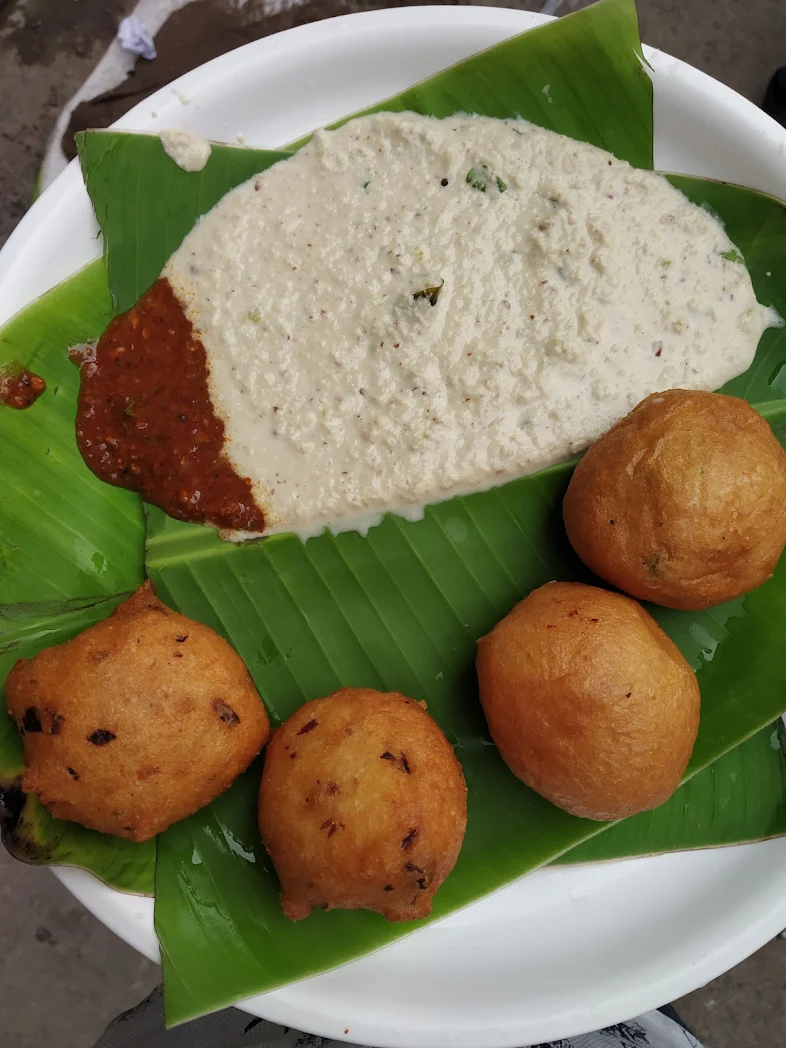
Punugulu Breakfast

== See also ==
- Bonda
- Andhra cuisine
- Indian cuisine
- Mangalore bajji
