= Mangalore bajji =

Indian fried food

Golibaje
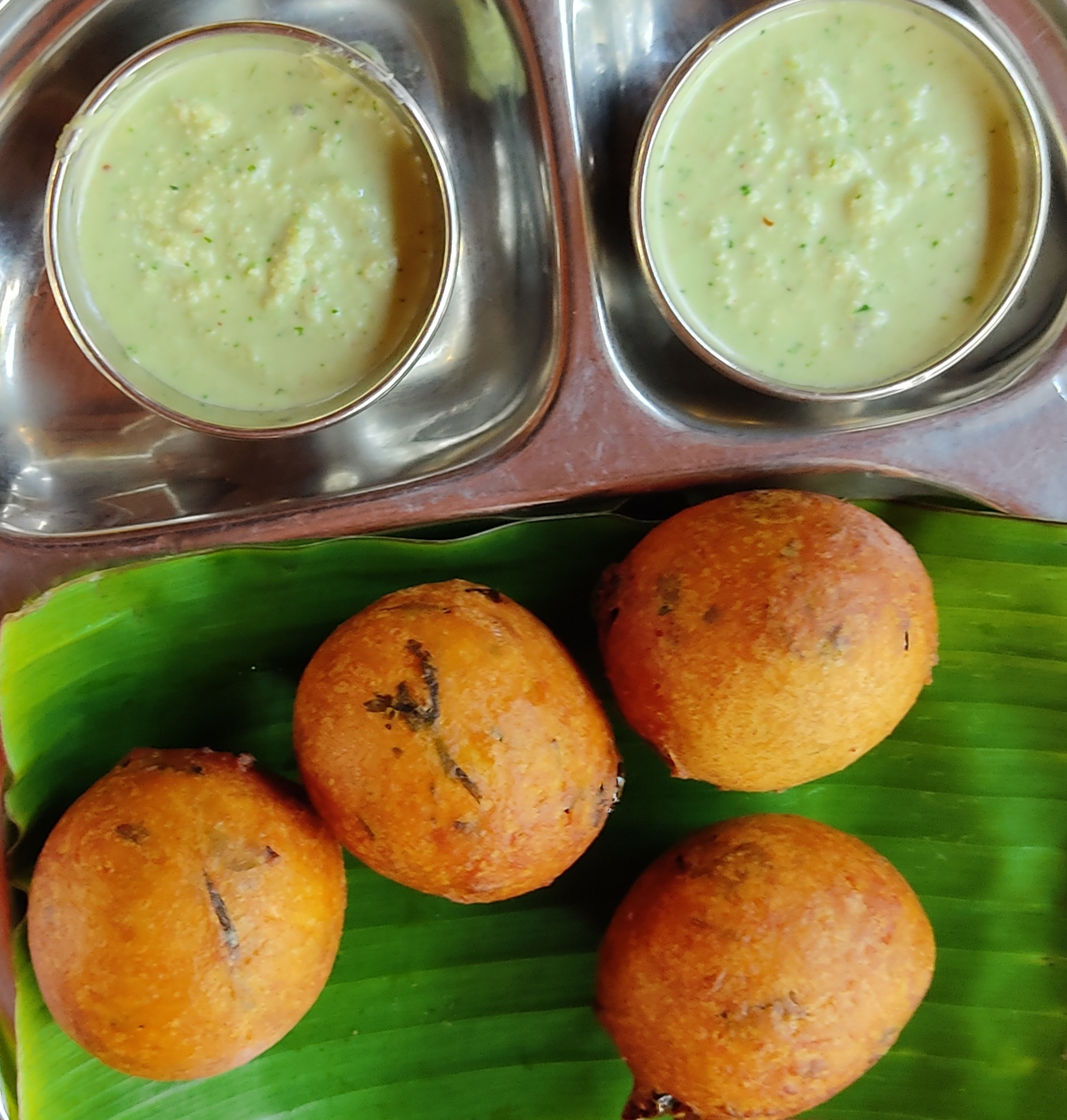
- Alternative names: Mangalore bajji
- Course: Breakfast
- Place of origin: India
- Region or state: Tulunad, Karnataka
- Main ingredients: Maida, curd, gram flour, rice flour, onion, coriander leaves, coconut, jeera, green chillies, ginger

Golibaje (in Tulu) or Mangalore bajji (in Kannada) is an Indian fried food made from various flours and curd. Other names for the dish include Mangalore baje.

== Ingredients ==
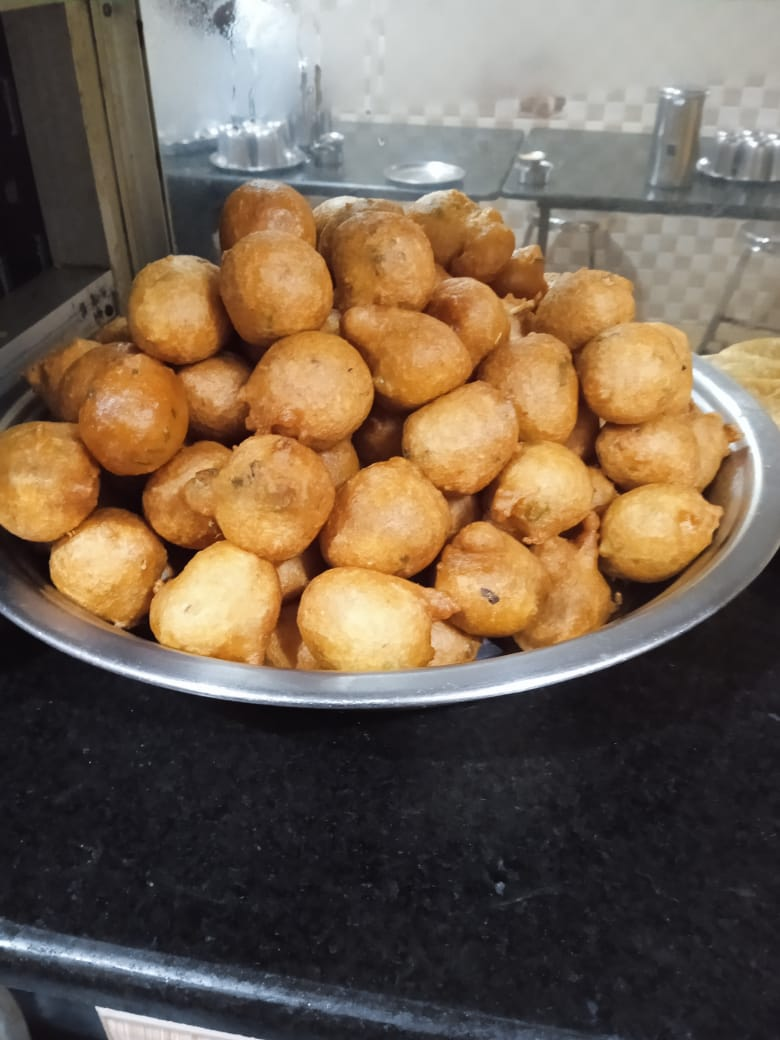

The main ingredients used to make Mangalore bajji include maida, curd, gram flour, rice flour, chopped onion, coriander leaves, coconut, jeera, green chillies, curry leaves, and salt. The ingredients are thoroughly mixed to form a hard batter, then shaped into a small ball and deep-fried, preferably in coconut oil. It is often served with chutney.

== Serving ==
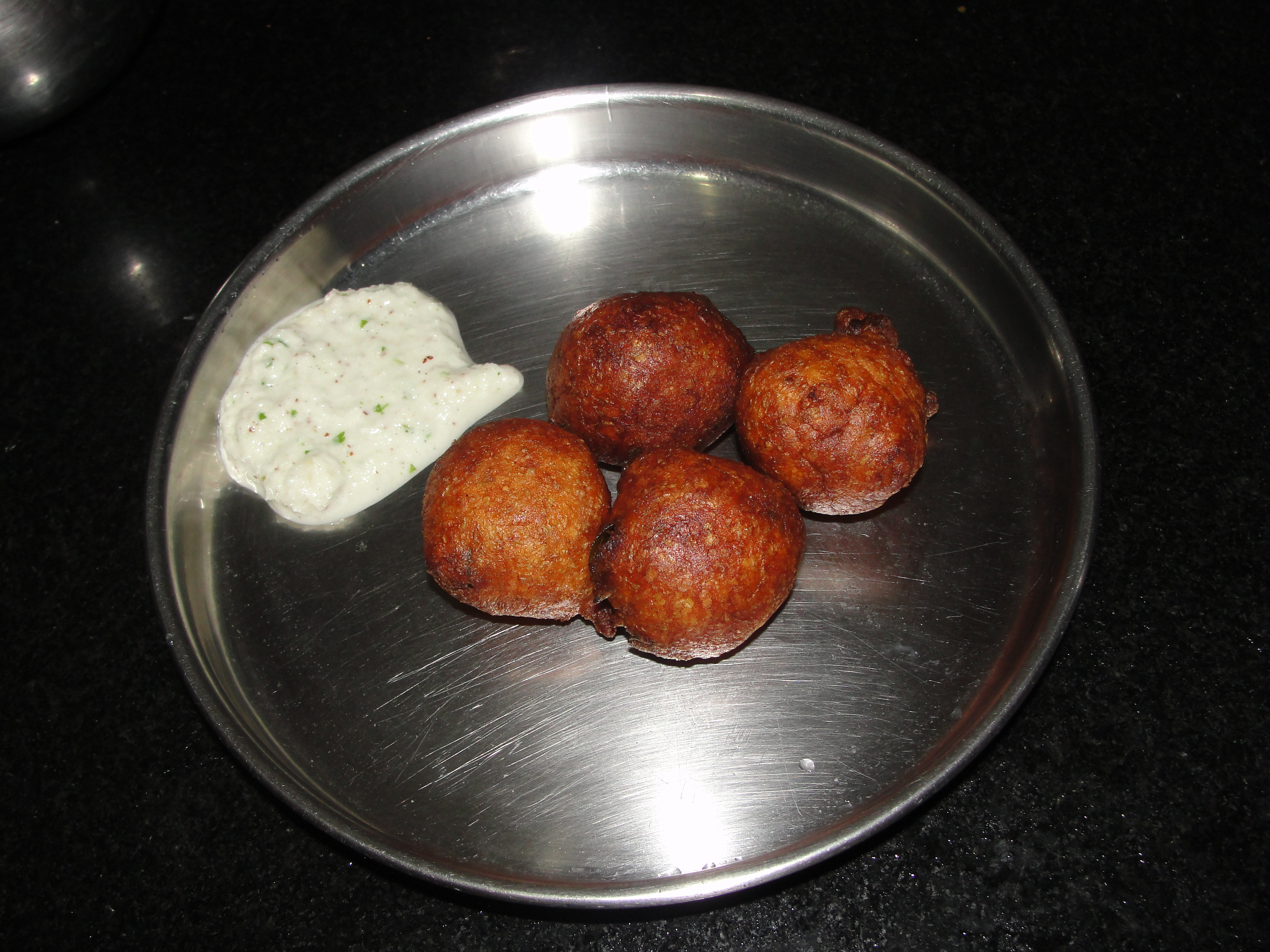
Mangalore bajji with coconut chutney

The dish is usually served warm with coconut chutney.

== See also ==
- Bonda
- List of Indian dishes
- Punugulu
