= Jeera aloo =

Vegetarian potato dish from Indian cuisine

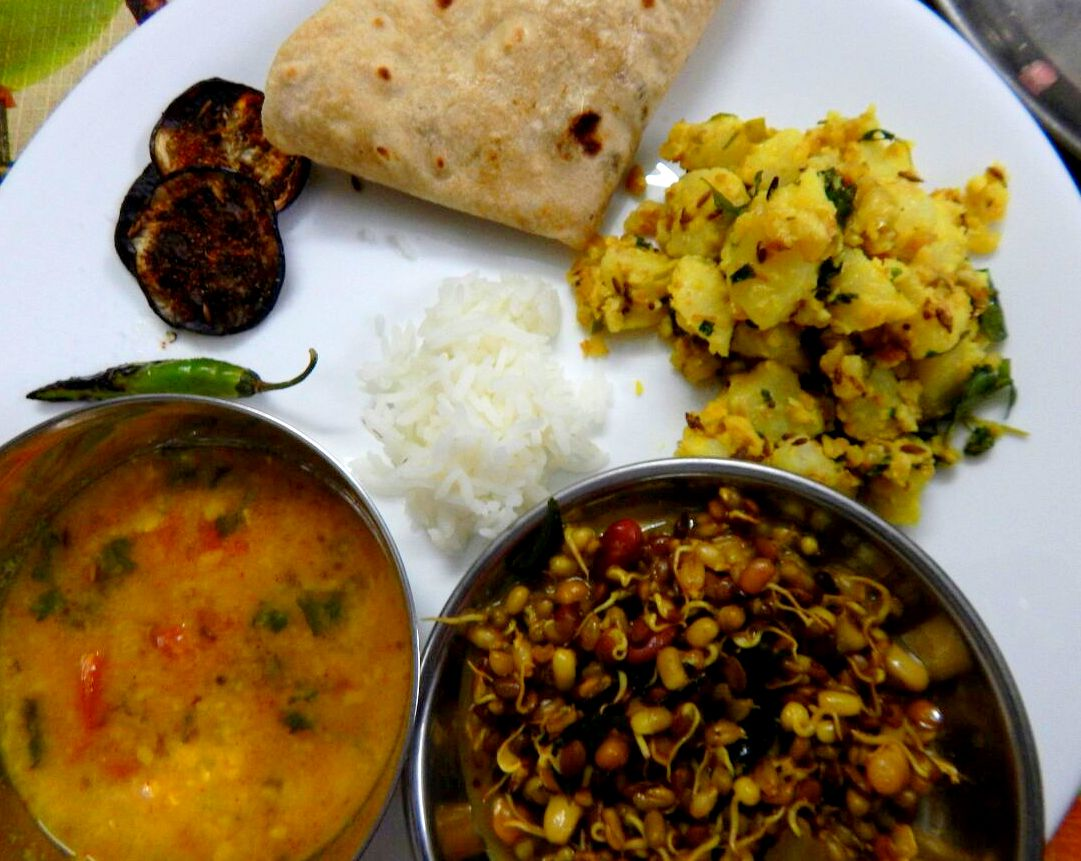
- Jeera aloo with sprouts and dal
- Alternative names: Jeera alu, geera aloo
- Type: Fried
- Course: Side dish
- Place of origin: India
- Region or state: Indian subcontinent
- Serving temperature: Hot
- Main ingredients: Potatoes, cumin seeds, Indian spices

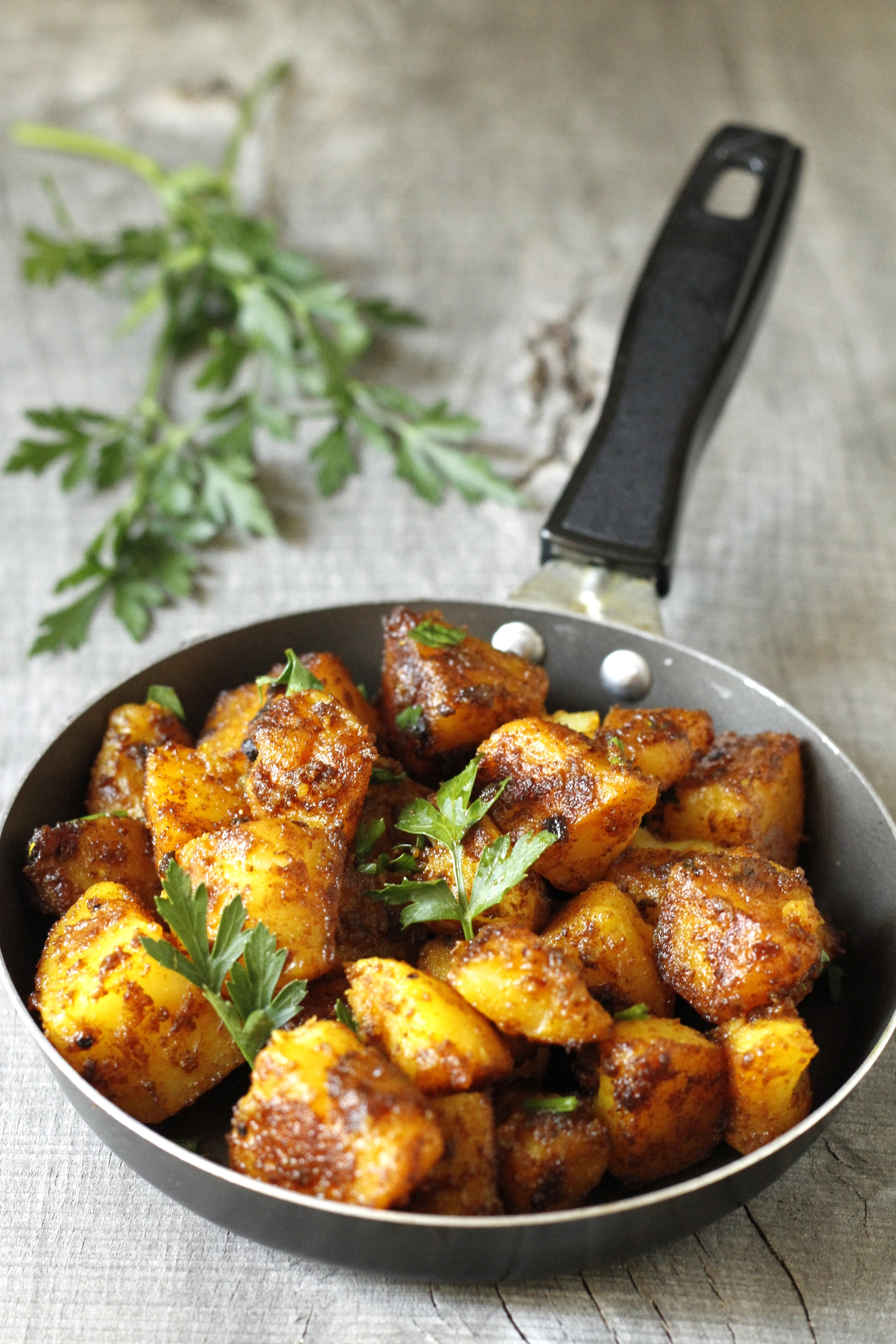
A fusion-style Jeera Aloo in Poland, garnished with parsley

Jeera Aloo is a typical vegetarian Indian dish which is often served as a side dish and normally goes well with hot puris, chapatti, roti or dal. Its main ingredients are potatoes (aloo), cumin seeds (jeera) and Indian spices. Other ingredients are red chili powder, ginger, coriander powder, curry leaves, vegetable oil and salt. In its traditional form the dish is not spicy, but it could be spiced up by adding powdered cayenne pepper. Other variations of the dish make use of sweet potatoes instead of regular ones.

== See also ==
- List of Indian dishes
- List of potato dishes
