= Dhoper chop =

Snack originating from the Indian subcontinent

Dhoper Chop
- Type: Snack
- Region or state: West Bengal
- Serving temperature: Hot
- Main ingredients: Potatoes, Breads, Spices, herbs

Dhoper chop is a snack originating from the Indian subcontinent, in West Bengal preparation, it is a huge egg-shaped snack in a bread jacket with ketchup and onion salad and sometimes with a cup of tea.

== Etymology ==
The word "Dhop" is a Bengali word which means "a lie" and the word "chop" means a small cutletfritters or Croquette in Bengali.

== Origin ==
The snack was invented in 1972 at Jadavpur University's Milonda's canteen by Milon Kanti Dey.

== Ingredients ==
Ingredients vary according to the region and the type of meat or vegetables used. Potatoes, and sometimes meat are prime ingredient with white bread. The spices used in Dhoper Chop may include onion, green chilies, pepper, cumin powder, garam masala powder, Kashmiri chili powder, coriander powder, salt, ghee, butter or any vegetable oil. The dish may be served with onion, salad, ketchup, fried potatoes, and sometimes with a cup of tea.

== See also ==
- List of chickpea dishes – Foods using chickpeas or their flour as a primary ingredient
- List of Indian dishes
- List of street foods
