= Batata vada =

Indian vegetarian fast food dish

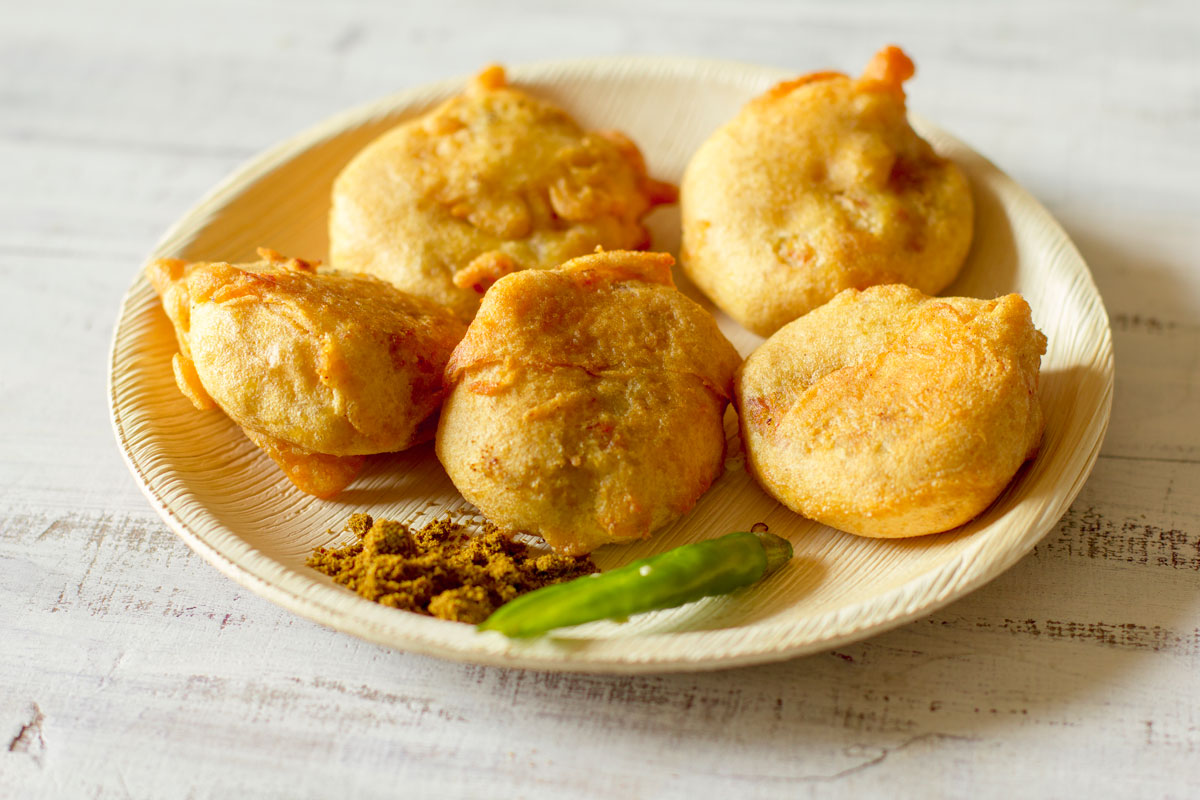
- Batata vadas are often eaten with green chillies.
- Course: Hors d'oeuvre/starter/appetizer
- Place of origin: India
- Region or state: Maharashtra
- Associated cuisine: Indian
- Main ingredients: Potatoes, chickpea flour

Batata vada (Marathi: बटाटा वडा, lit. 'potato fritter') is a popular vegetarian fast food dish from the Indian state of Maharashtra. The dish consists of a mashed potato patty coated with chickpea flour, which is then deep-fried and served hot with chutney. The vada is typically around two or three inches in diameter. Across different regions of India, this dish is also known as aloo bonda, aloo vada, batata bonda, potato bonda and potato vada.

Although Maharashtrian in origin, batata vada has gained popularity in the rest of India as well.

== Preparation ==
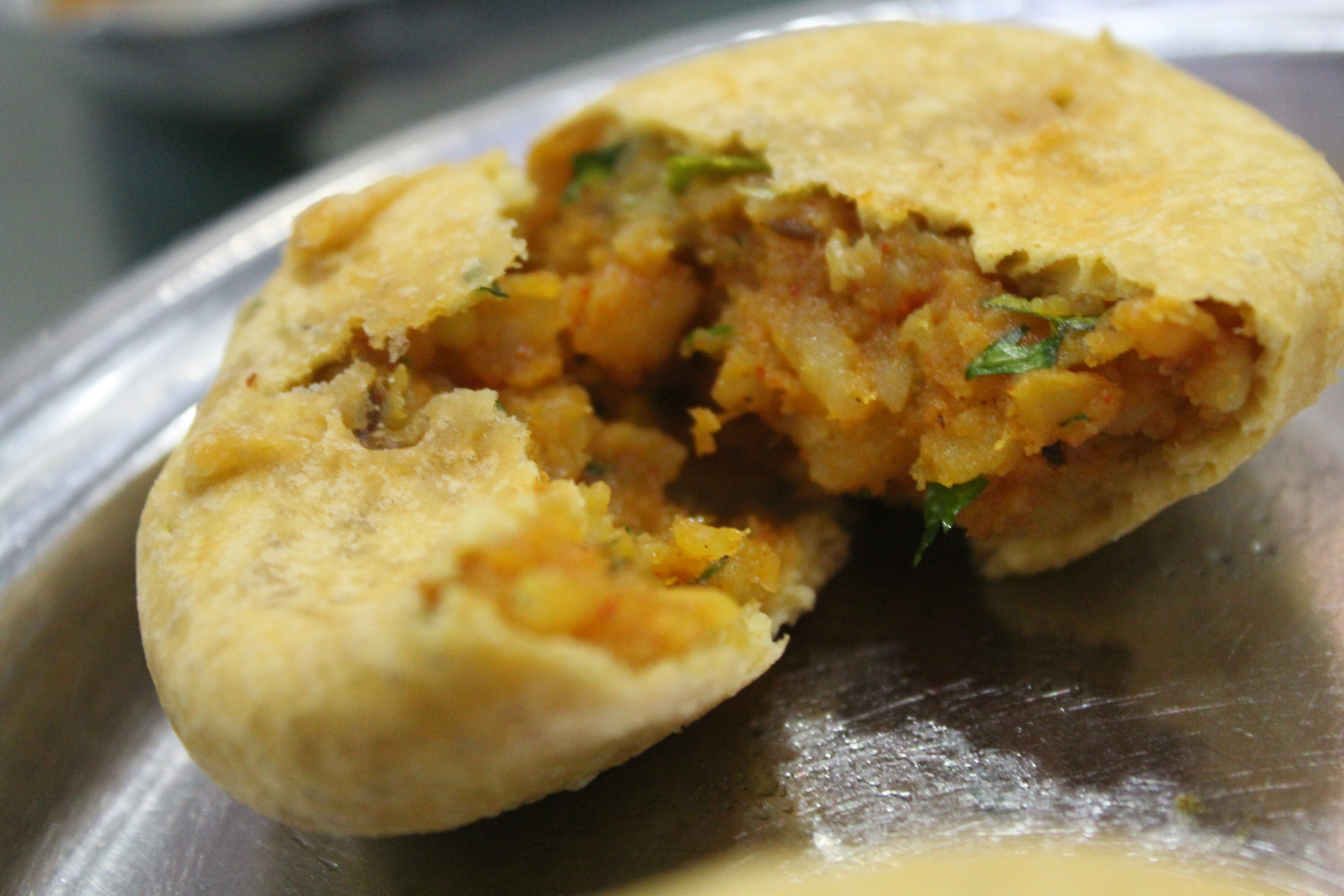
Broken batata vada, sold in Mumbai

The potato filling and the batter used to coat the filling are the only two components of batata vada.

The potatoes are boiled, mashed coarsely and set aside. Seasoning like asafoetida, mustard seeds, chillies, onions and curry leaves are pan-fried with garlic-ginger paste, turmeric and salt, then cooked with the mashed potatoes.

A thick batter is made using chickpea flour, seasoned with salt, turmeric and red chilli powder. Sometimes a small quantity of baking powder is also added to make the batter fluffier. To make the fritters, little balls of the potato mixture are coated in the batter and deep-fried in hot vegetable oil.

It is possible to use red chilli paste to make the vada spicy.

Batata vadas are usually accompanied by green chutney or dry chutneys, such as Shengdana Chutney (chutney in dry powder made from crushed groundnuts) and garlic-coconut chutney. Often, Jain batata vada recipes are a variation that replaces potatoes with raw bananas.

== Serving ==
Batata vada is typically served very hot with green chillies and chutneys of various types. The most common way to eat this dish is in the form of vada pav.

== See also ==
- List of Indian dishes
