= Kabiraji =

Indian fried meat dish

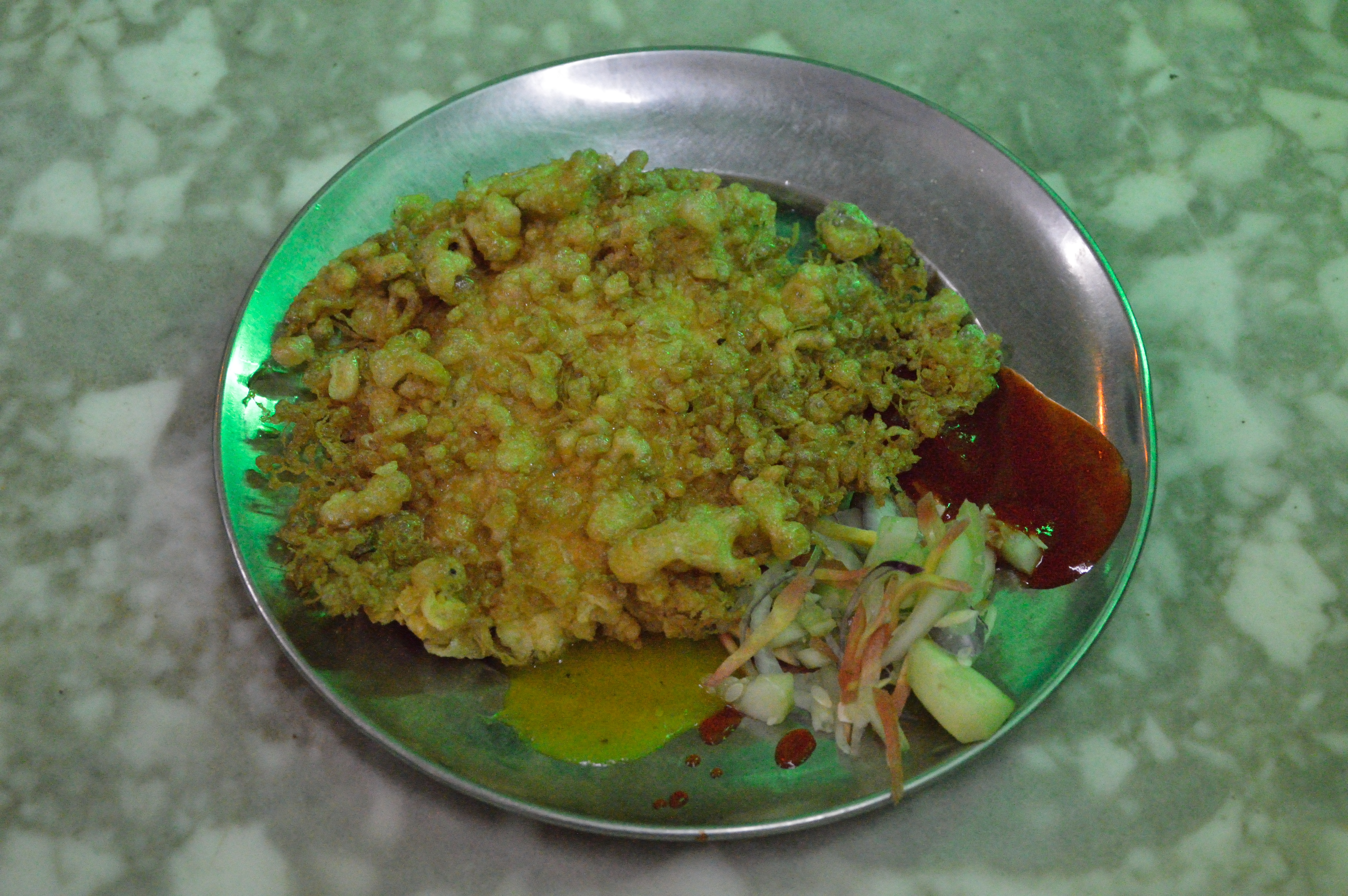
Chicken kabiraji

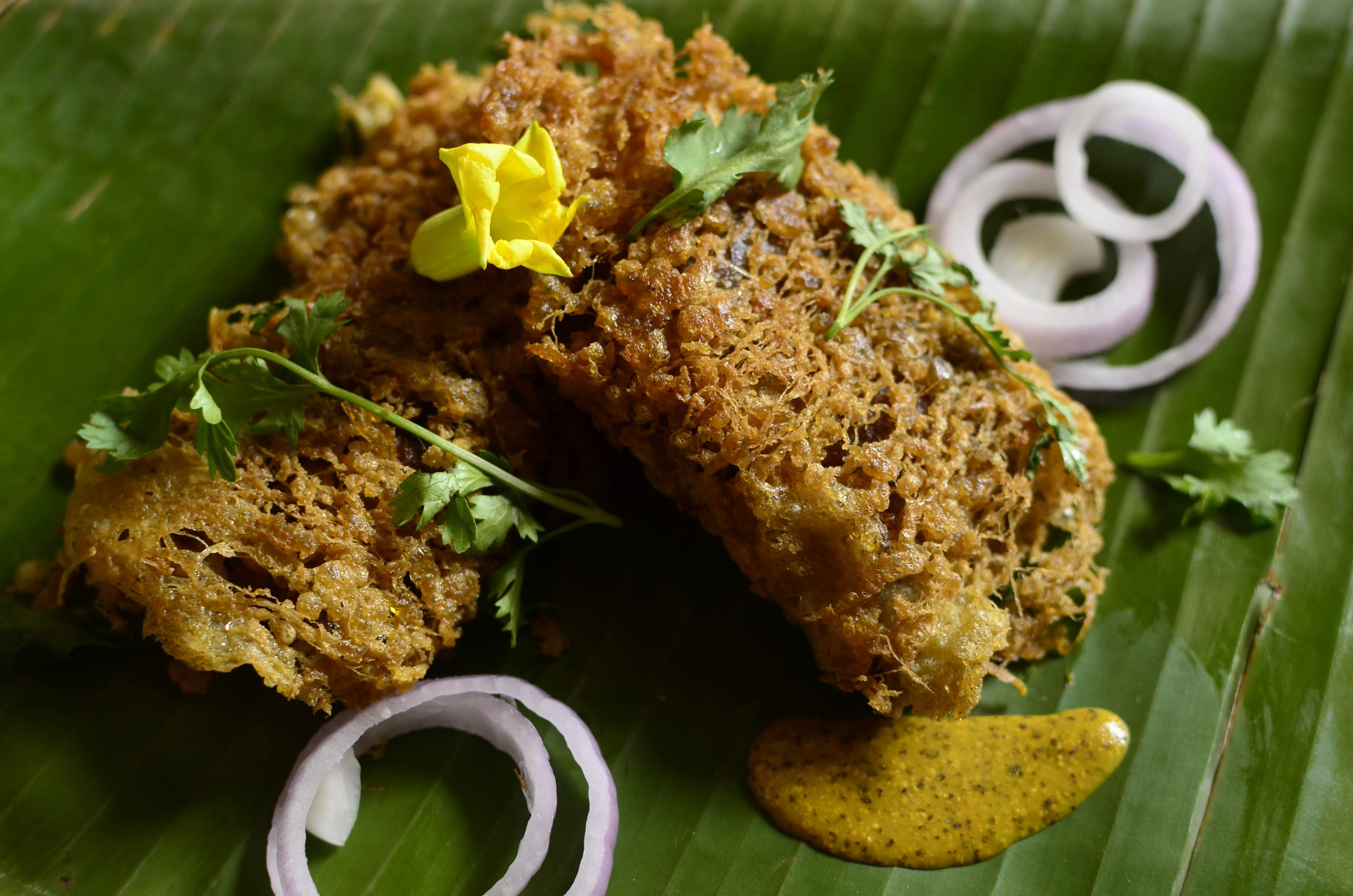
A fish Kabiraji on a plaintain leaf plate served with Kasundi.

Kabiraji (Bengali: কবিরাজি) is an Indian fried dish made of chicken, fish., mutton or prawn. This is a popular dish in eastern India, originating from Kolkata. The dish has a fish, chicken or mutton cutlet inside, wrapped in a coating of crunchy deep-fried egg floss.

== See also ==
- List of Indian dishes
