= List of Indian soups and stews =

Indian soups and stews

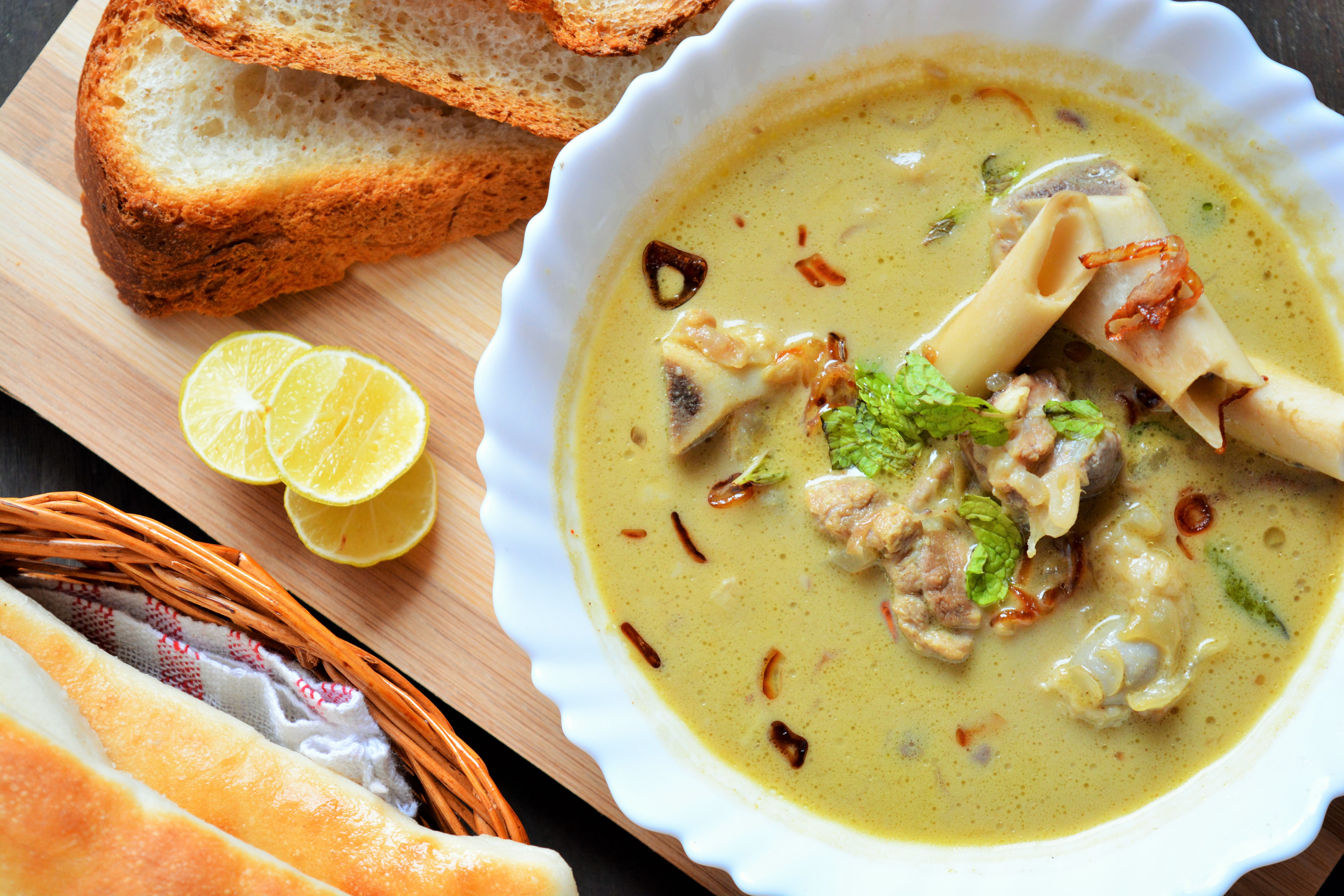
Hyderabadi marag, a traditional mutton curry from Hyderabad, India. This dish is served as a starter curry.

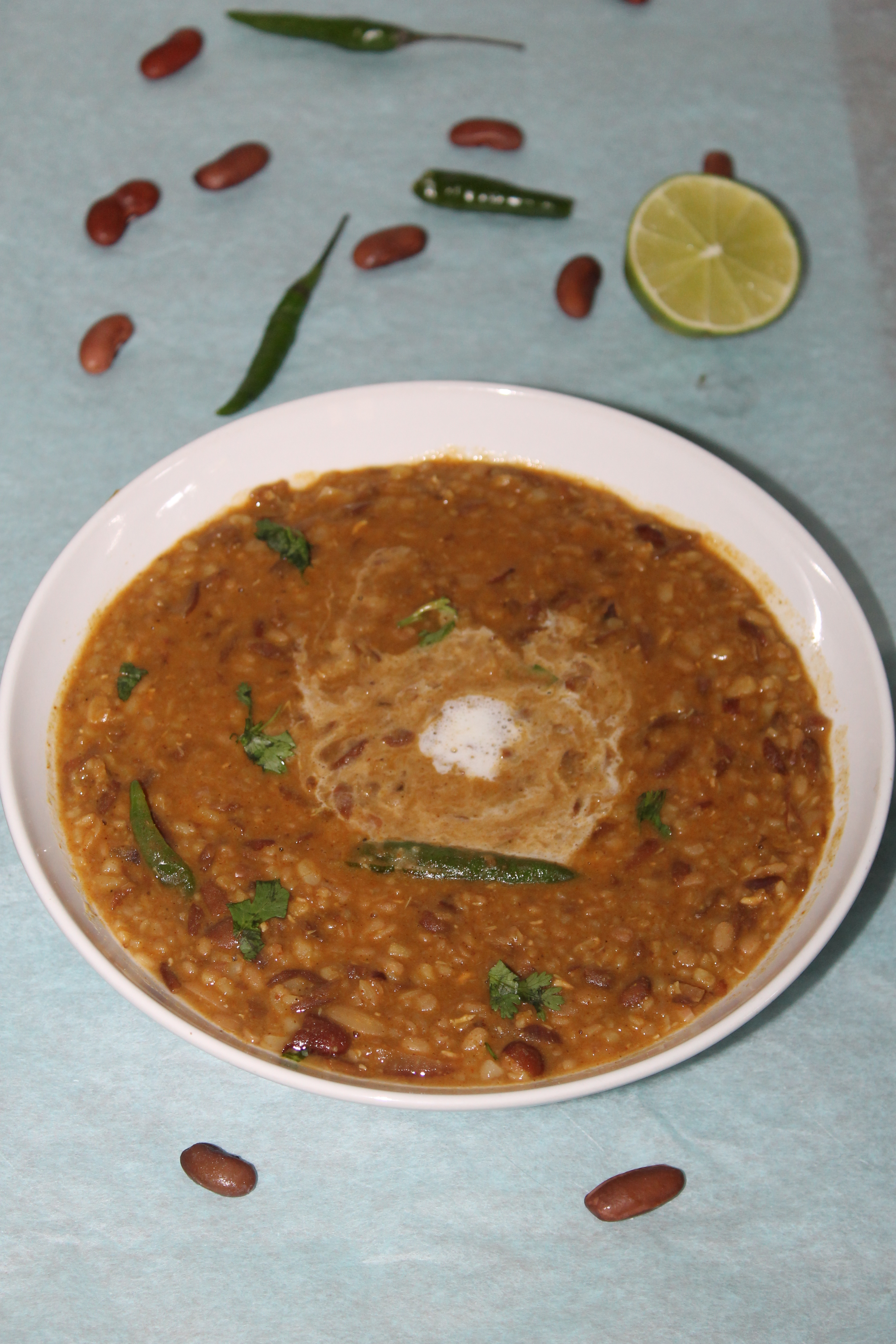
Dal makhani, a dish made from a wide variety of lentils along with butter and cream

This is a list of Indian soups and stews. Indian cuisine consists of cooking traditions and practices from the Indian subcontinent, famous for its traditional rich tastes and diverse flavours.

== Indian soups and stews ==
- Sambar (Tamil: [saːmbaːɾ], romanized: sāmbār) is a lentil-based vegetable stew, cooked with pigeon peas and tamarind broth. It is popular in South Indian and Sri Lankan cuisines.

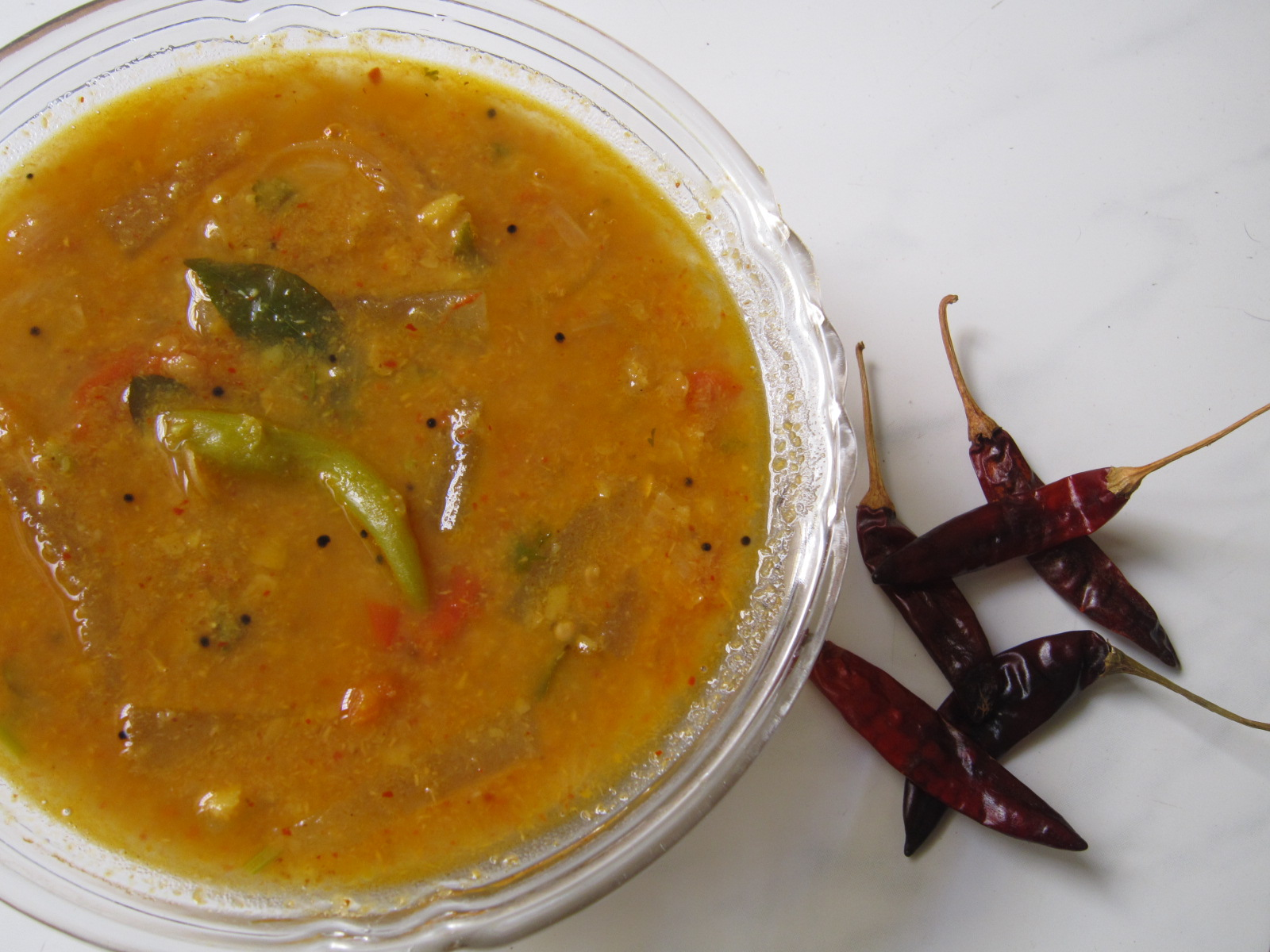
Traditional sambar

- Kadhi, or karhi, is a dish originating from Rajasthan. It consists of a thick gravy based on gram flour, and contains vegetable fritters called pakoras, to which dahi (yogurt) is added to give it a bit of sour taste. It is often eaten with cooked rice or roti.
- Dal makhani (pronounced [d aː l (ˈmək.kʰə.ni]) is a dish originating in New Delhi, India. It is made with urad dal (black beans) and other pulses, and includes butter and cream (makhan is Hindi for butter).
- Korma, or qorma, (Hindi: क़ोरमा; Bengali: কোরমা) is a dish originating in South Asia, consisting of meat or vegetables braised with dahi, water or stock, and spices to produce a thick sauce or gravy.
- Paya is a traditional meat stew originating in the Indian subcontinent. Recipes for this dish vary regionally. The soup base is created by sautéed onions and garlic, where a number of curry-based spices are then added to the meat and bones. The cooked dish is served with a garnish of fresh diced ginger and fresh long coriander leaves, along with fresh sliced lemon.
- Macho jhol is a spicy Assamese fish curry, made with potato, chillies, ginger and garlic.
- Hyderabadi marag, or marag, is a spicy mutton soup served as a starter in Hyderabad, India, and part of Hyderabadi cuisine. It is prepared from tender mutton with bone. It is thin soup. The soup has become one of the starters at Hyderabadi weddings.
- Aloo mutter is a vegetarian North Indian dish from the Indian subcontinent which is made from potatoes (aloo) and peas (mattar) in a mildly spiced creamy tomato-based gravy. It is a vegetarian dish. The gravy base is generally cooked with garlic, ginger, onion, tomatoes, cilantro (coriander), cumin seeds, red chilli, turmeric, garam masala, and many other spices. It can also be made without onion or garlic.
- Vindaloo, or vindalho, is an Indian curry dish, originally from Goa. It is known globally in its British Indian form as a staple of curry house and Indian restaurant menus, and is often regarded as a fiery, spicy dish.
- Keema matar (English: "peas and mince"), also rendered "keema matar", is a dish from the Indian subcontinent, made from minced meat and peas.
- Kosha mangsho (also referred to as mutton curry or lamb curry) is a dish that is prepared from goat meat (or sometimes lamb meat) and vegetables.
- Mulligatawny (/ˌmʌlɪɡəˈtɔːni/) is a soup which originated from South Indian cuisine. The name originates from the Tamil words miḷagu (மிளகு 'black pepper'), and taṇṇi (தண்ணி, 'water'); literally, "pepper-water".
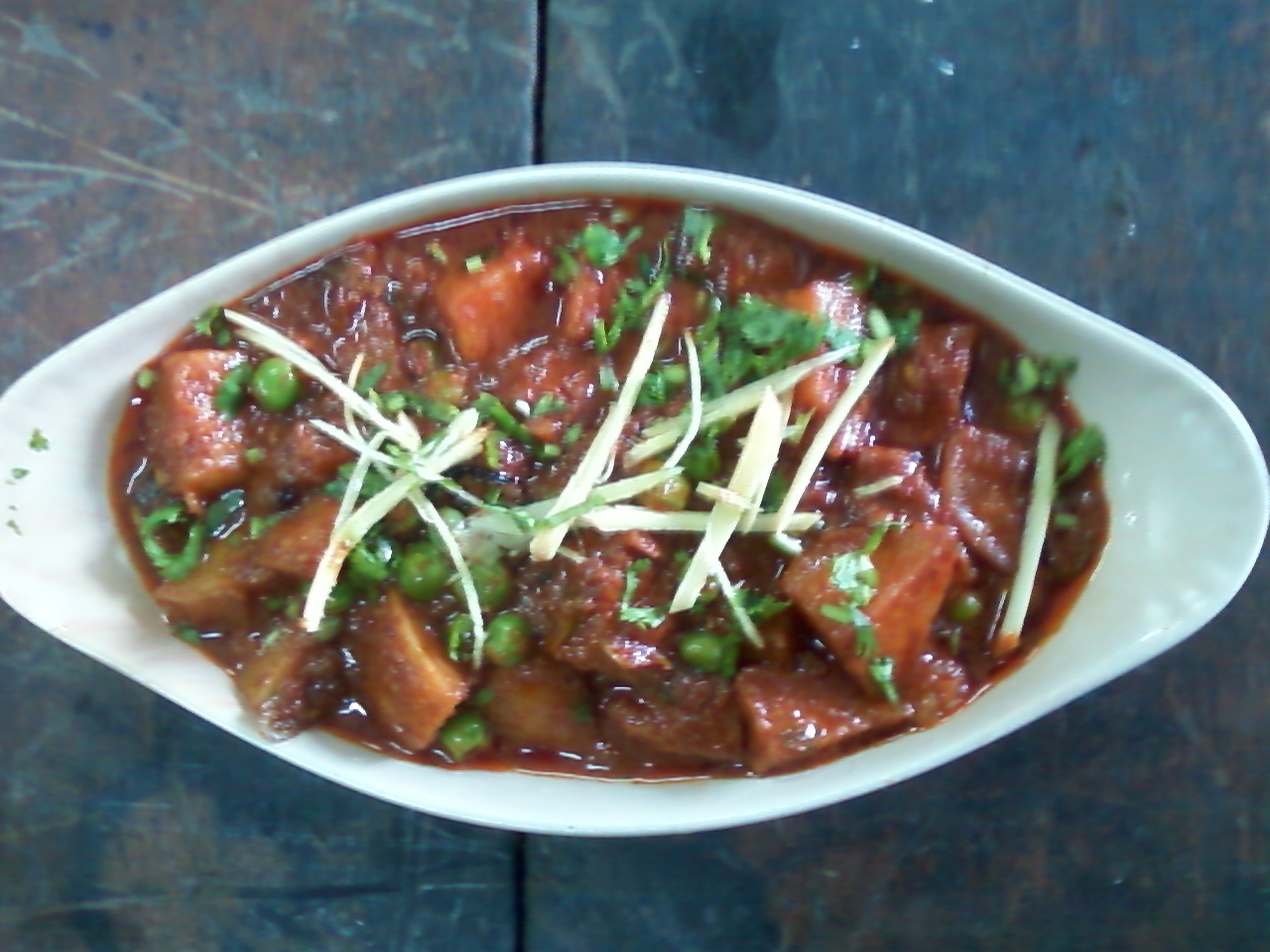
Alu mutter

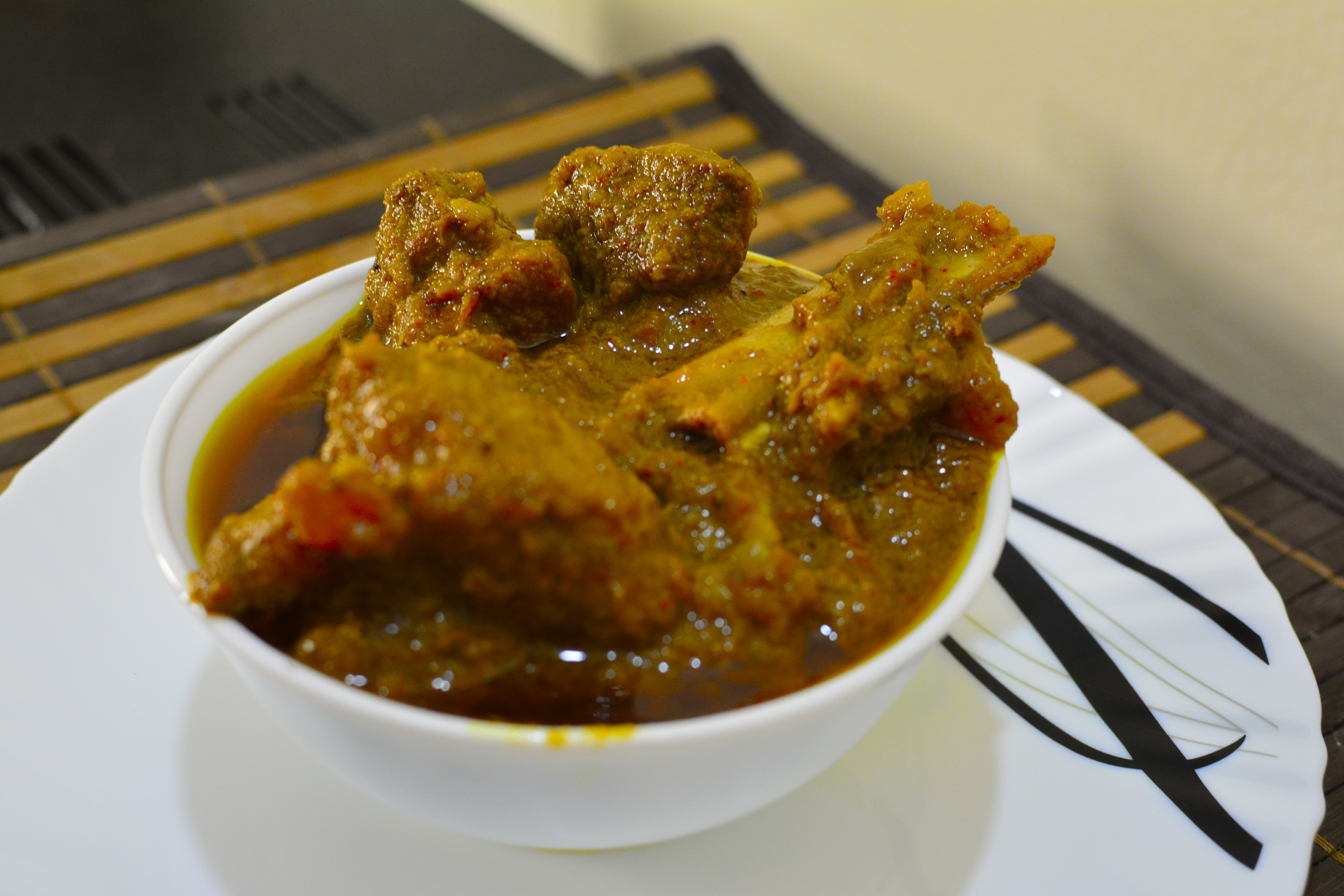
Bengali mutton curry

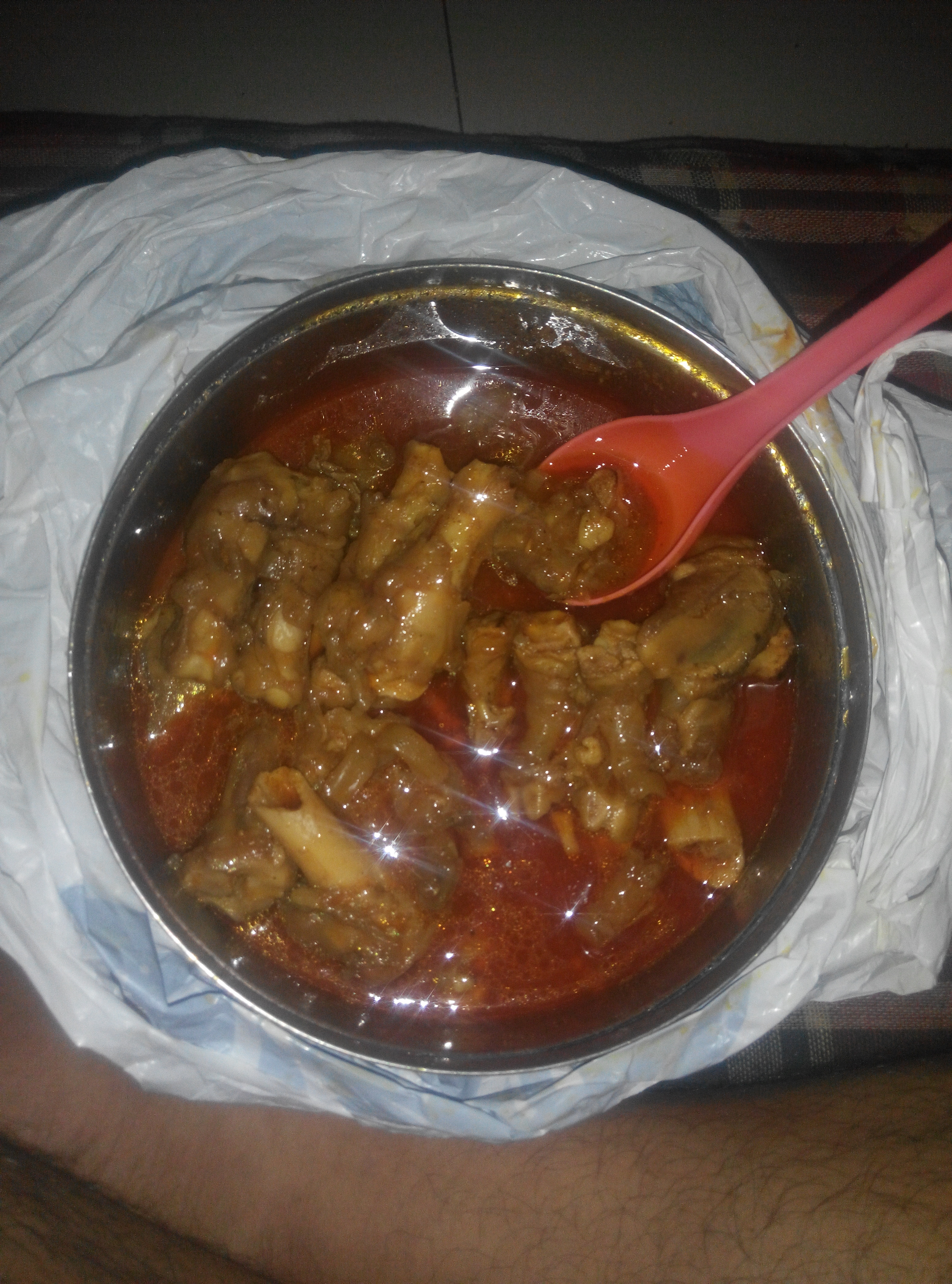
Paya curry cooked in Marathi style

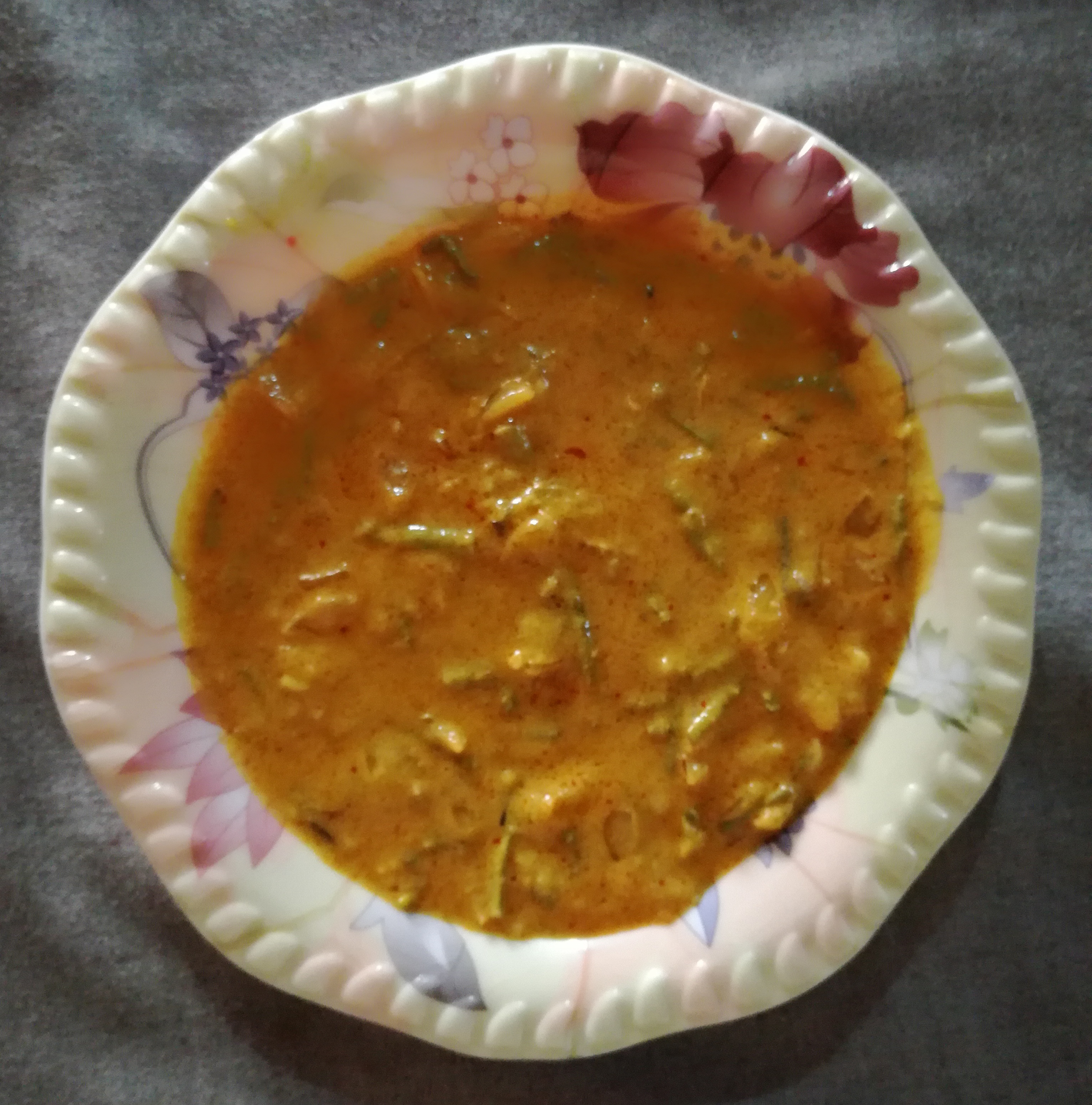
A variation of kadhi

== See also ==
- List of soups
- List of stews
- List of Indian dishes
