= Dalithoy =

Indian lentil soup

Daali toy

Dalithoy, also known as daali toy, is soup made with split yellow lentils in the Malvani cuisine of the Konkan region of India. Daali is the Konkani word for daal or lentil.

== Description ==
Dalithoy, or daali toy, is made with split yellow lentils in the Malvani cuisine of the Konkan region of India. Daali is the Konkani word for daal or lentil.
