= Bonda (snack) =

Deep-fried potato snack

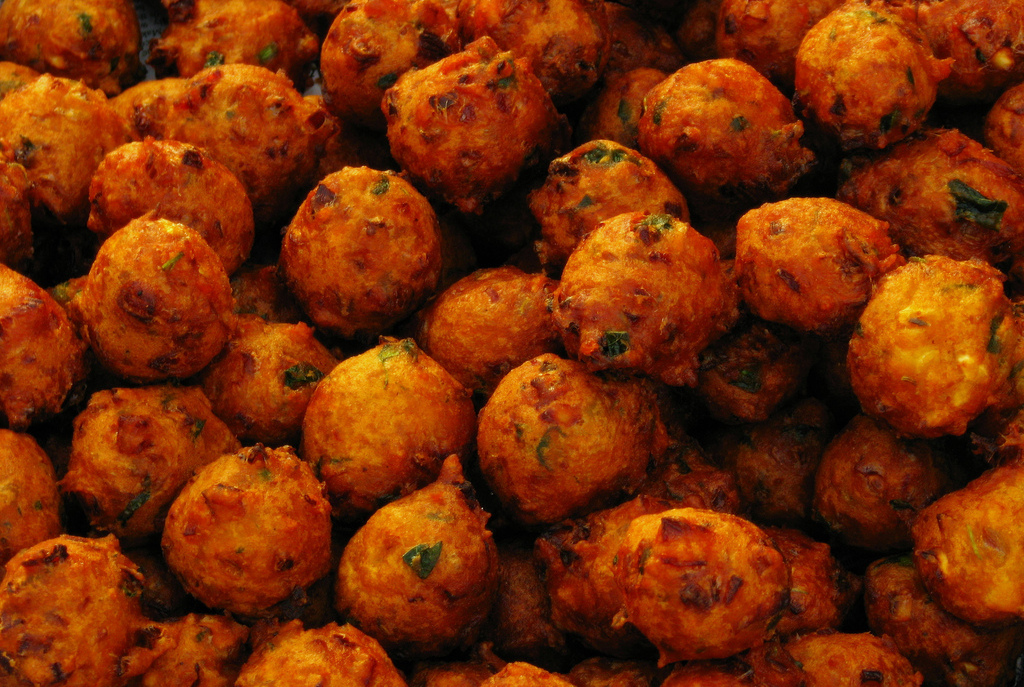
- Alternative names: Aloo chop/Aloo Bonda
- Place of origin: India
- Region or state: South India
- Serving temperature: Hot
- Main ingredients: Gram flour batter, potato (or other vegetables)

Bonda is a deep-fried South Indian potato snack that has various sweet and savory versions in different regions. The most common is aloo bonda (potato bonda), and other region-specific variations include potato replaced with sweet potato, tapioca, grated pineapple, green peas, paneer, or other ingredients including rice.

== History ==
A recipe for bonda (as parika) is mentioned in Manasollasa, a 12th-century Sanskrit encyclopedia compiled by Someshvara III, who ruled from present-day Karnataka.

== Preparation ==
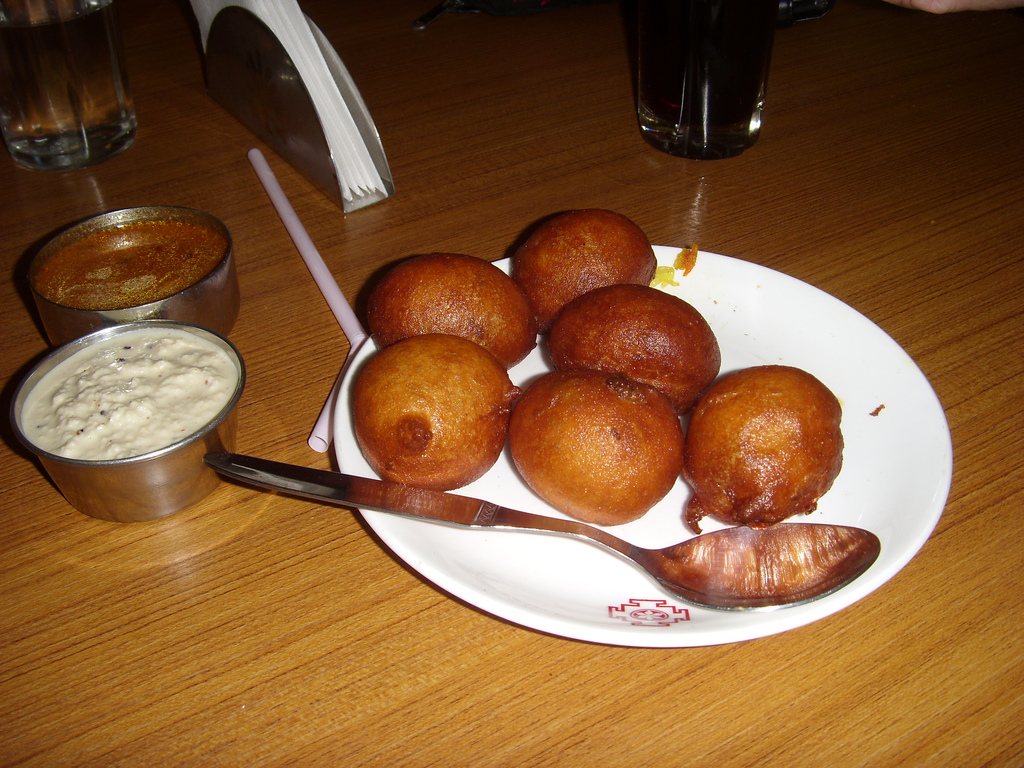
Mangalore bonda

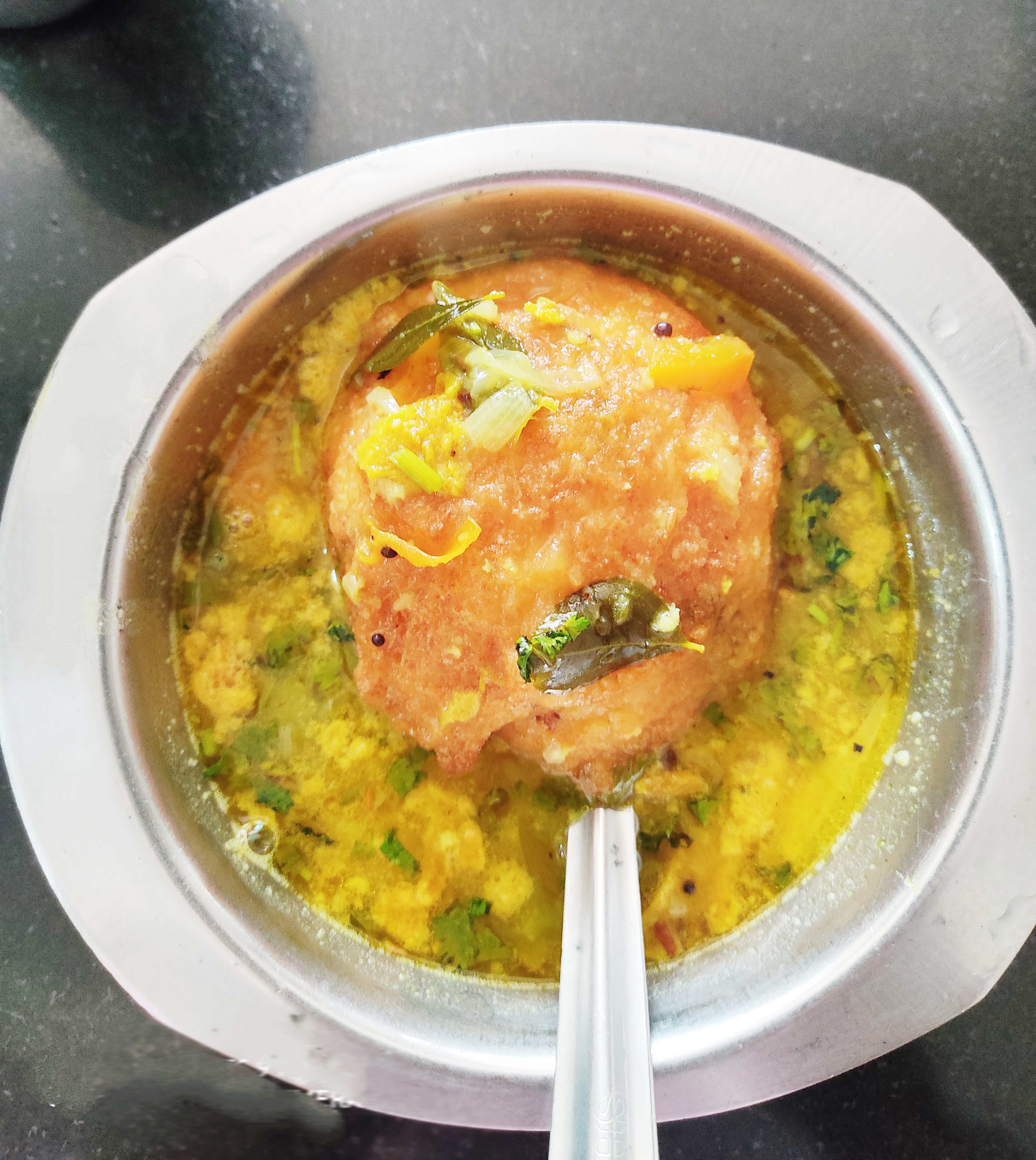
Bonda soup: urad dal bonda served with hot dal soup

The process of making a spicy bonda involves making a potato filling that is dipped in gram flour batter and deep-fried.

Bonda has a sweet and a spicy variant.

Some regional variants in Kerala replace the potato with tapioca (tapioca bonda) or sweet potato and some onion, hard-boiled egg (mutta Bonda), masala, minced meat and other ingredients.

In Tamil Nadu, bonda is made from black gram (ulundu) batter.

In Andhra Pradesh, it is known as bondalu or poornalu.

Vegetable bonda is a dish of Udupi cuisine where fresh green peas and other finely chopped vegetables like French beans, carrots and coriander leaves are used as filling. Goli baje (also known as Mangalore bonda or Mangalore bajji) is another variant from Karnataka. This bonda, however, is made from maida flour (refined flour).

== See also ==
- Indian cuisine
- Vada
- Batata vada
