= Golichina Mamsam =

Popular meat dish in Telangana, India

- Course: Main
- Place of origin: India
- Region or state: Telangana
- Main ingredients: Mutton

Golichina Mamsam is a popular meat dish in Telangana, India. Golichina means fry in Telugu and it is made with local spices. It is a simple yet fiery mutton dish that goes well with either rice or paratha.
