= Far far =

Snack food of Indian origin

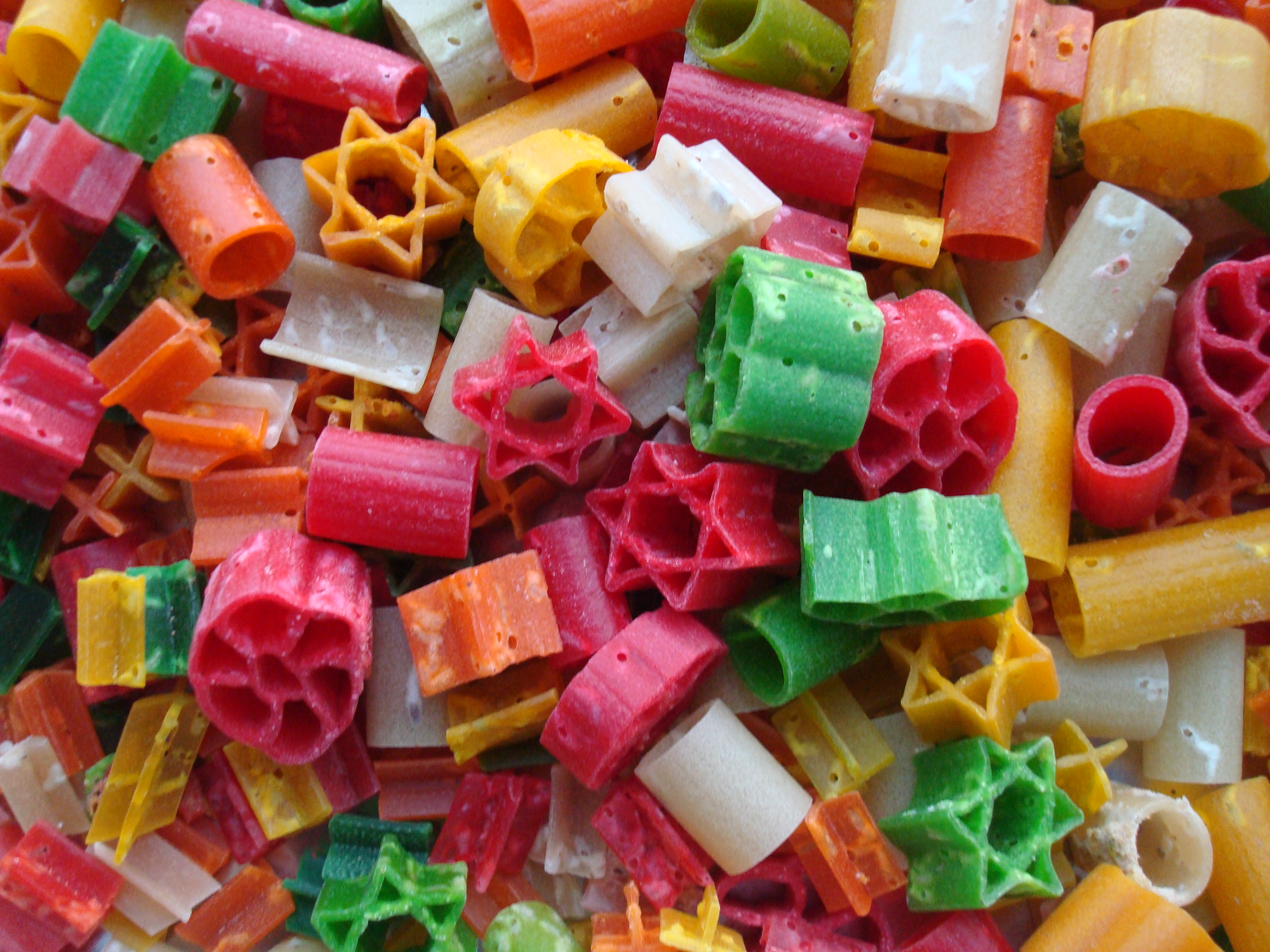
- Far far
- Course: Snack
- Place of origin: India
- Main ingredients: Potato starch, sago
- Variations: Tapioca or wheat flour

Far far (also fryum or bobby) is an Indian snack food composed primarily of potato starch and tinted sago. They may also contain tapioca and wheat flour. Far far puffs up instantly when deep fried, and is either eaten as a snack or served like a papadum to accompany a meal. It comes in a variety of colors and shapes such as the Shatkona (stars of David) and wheels.

== See also ==
- List of Indian snack foods
- List of deep fried foods
- List of potato dishes
