= Chingri malai curry =

Bengali prawn curry

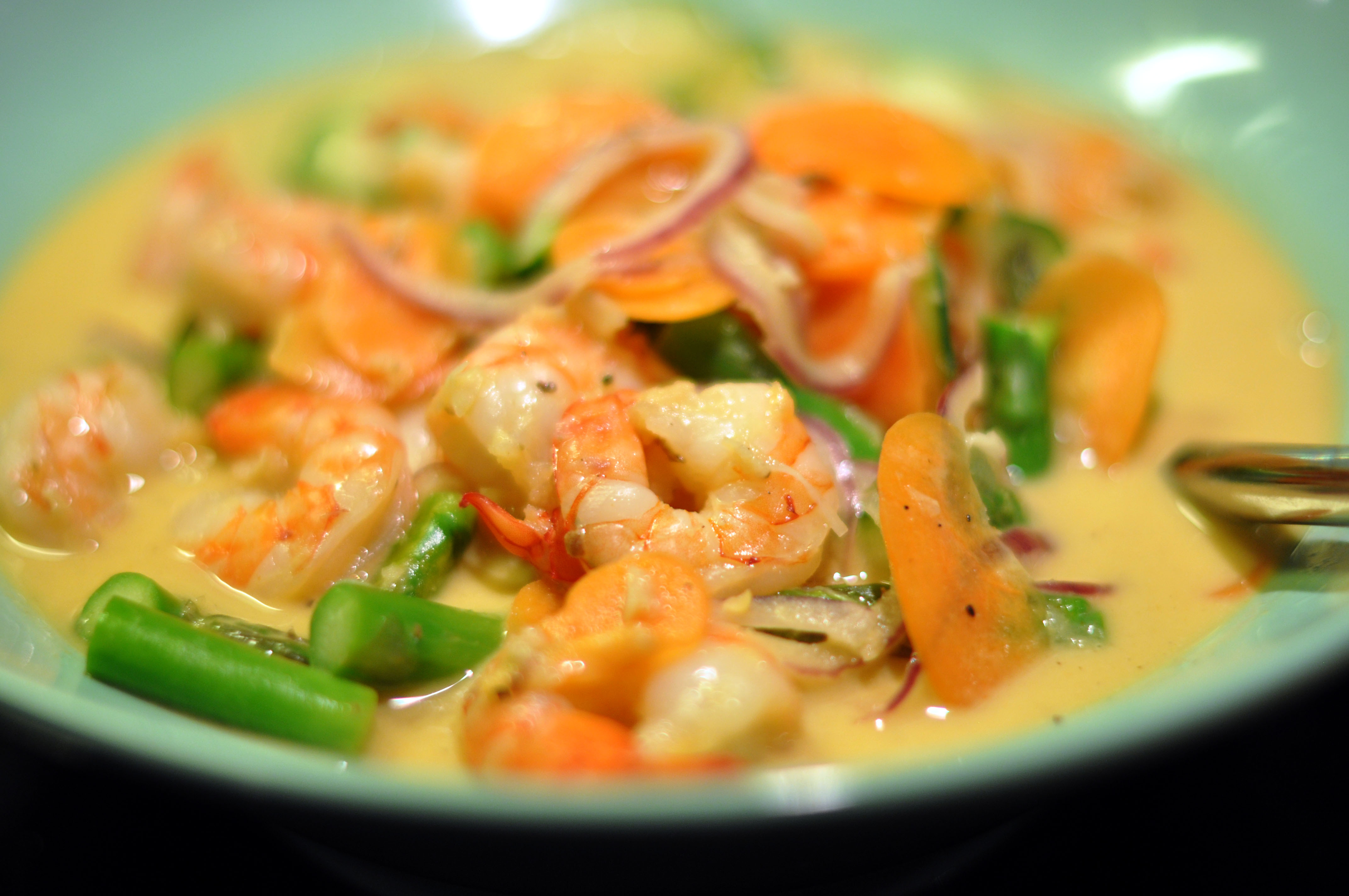
- Alternative names: Prawn malai curry
- Type: Curry
- Course: Main course
- Place of origin: West Bengal, Malaysia
- Region or state: Bengal
- Serving temperature: Hot
- Main ingredients: Prawns and coconut milk
- Variations: Lobster malai curry

Chingri malai curry or malai chingri, also known as prawn malai curry, is a Bengali curry made from tiger (bagda) and king prawns (chingri) and coconut milk flavoured with spices. The dish is popular throughout Bengal and is served during weddings and celebrations, or for guests, and was also very popular among the British in Calcutta. The term malai is usually associated with the coconut milk used in the preparation though it is also traced to historical trade and culinary links with Southeast Asia.

== See also ==
- Daab Chingri
