= Hyderabadi marag =

Indian spicy mutton soup

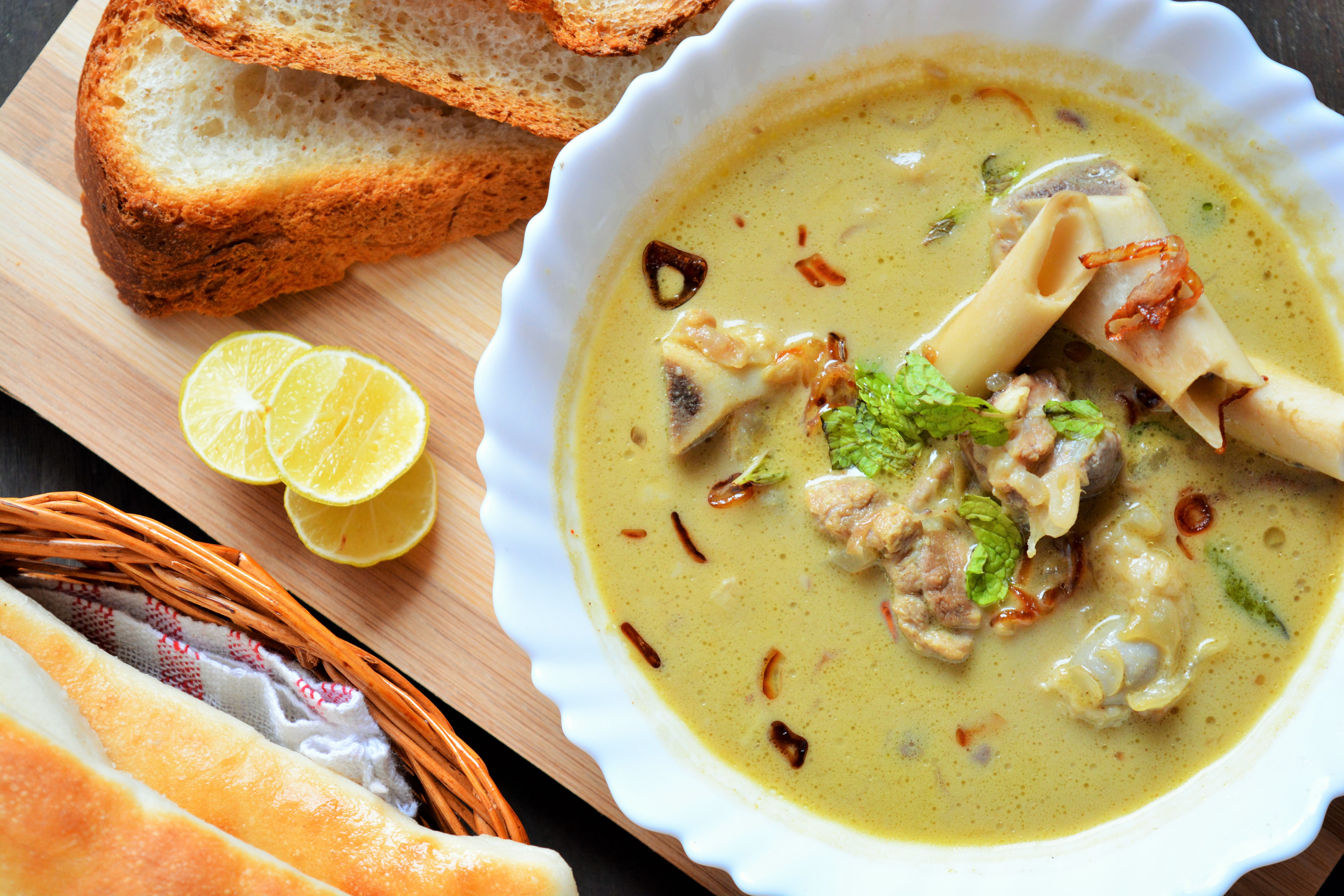
- Marag
- Alternative names: Mutton stew
- Place of origin: Hyderabad State
- Main ingredients: Mutton with bones, Indian spices

Hyderabadi marag or marag is a spicy mutton soup served as a starter in Hyderabad Deccan and part of Hyderabadi cuisine. It is prepared from tender mutton with bone. It is thin soup. The soup has become one of the starters at Hyderabadi weddings.

== Ingredients ==
The ingredients include those locally available such as mutton with bone, onions, cashew nuts, curd, coconut powder, boiled milk, cream, ginger-garlic paste, salt, cardamom, cinnamon, cloves, black pepper powder, green chillies, etc. In some recipes, white flour is used to thicken the broth to give it a more creamy texture.

== See also ==
- List of Indian soups and stews
- List of soups
