= Veg kolhapuri =

Vegetable dish from Kolhapur, India

Vegetable kolhapuri
- Alternative names: Veg kolhapuri
- Type: Curry
- Course: Main course
- Place of origin: India
- Region or state: Maharashtra
- Main ingredients: Vegetables

Vegetable kolhapuri is a dish from the city of Kolhapur in Maharashtra, India consisting of mixed vegetables in a thick, spiced gravy. It is served as a main course accompanied by flatbreads such as chapatis.
