= Daab chingri =

Bengali prawn curry

Daab Chingri
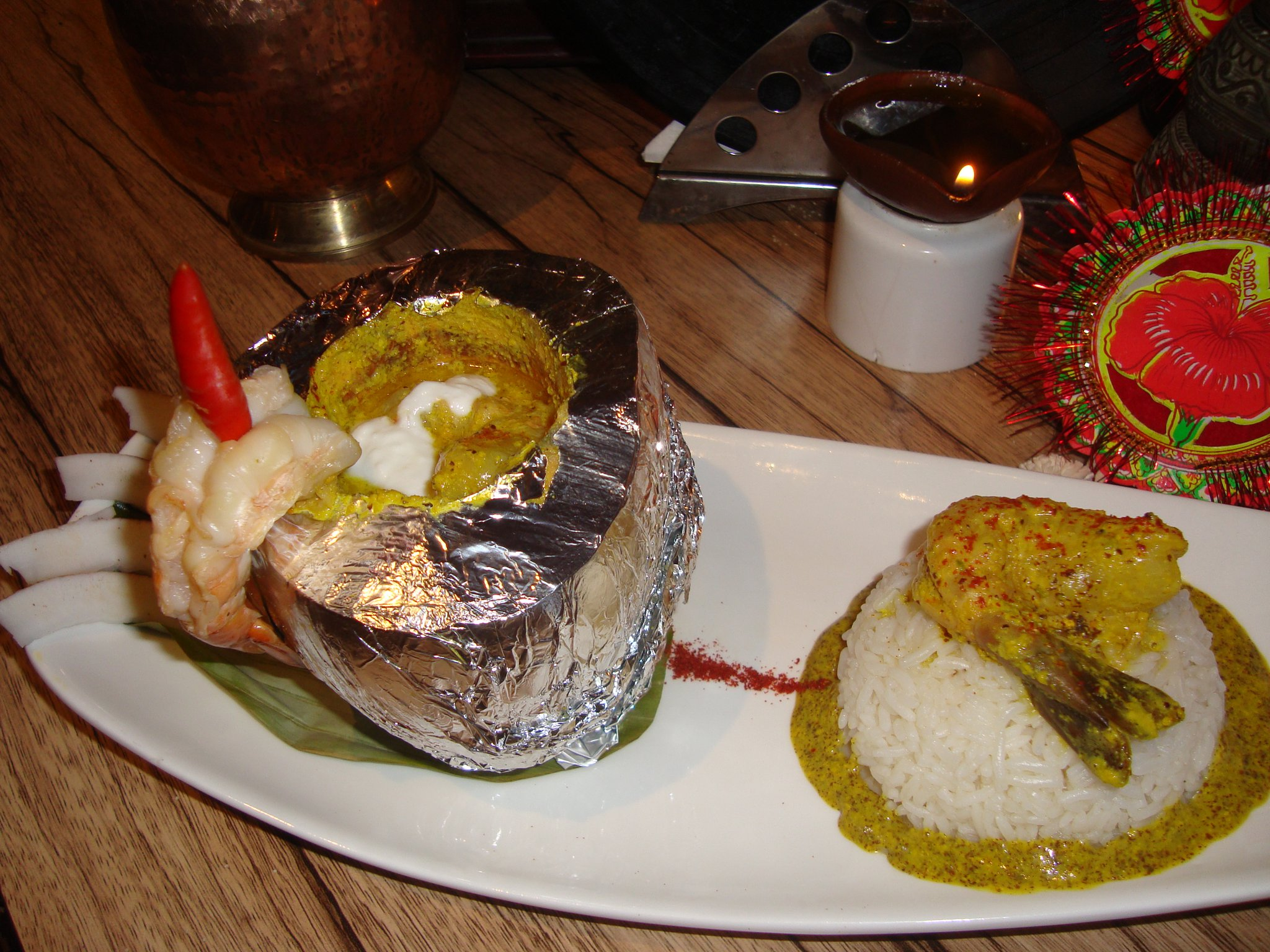
- Alternative names: Prawn malai curry
- Type: Curry
- Course: Main course
- Place of origin: Bengal (India and Bangladesh)
- Serving temperature: Hot
- Main ingredients: Prawns and coconut

Daab chingri, also known as chingri daab, is a Bengali prawn curry, cooked and served in a green coconut shell.

== Preparation ==
The interior ingredients are large prawns, butter or ghee or mustard oil, onions, turmeric powder, chopped green chilli, garlic paste and ginger paste. On top are various spices. The ingredients are mixed together and stuffed into a hollowed tender coconut, which is then sealed (traditionally with dough or mud) before being slow cooked. The completed dish is served in the coconut shell in which it was cooked.

== Popularity ==
Daab chingri is a popular Bengali dish. It is often cooked during Pohela Boishakh, Durga Puja, and other special occasions. It is a prominent feature of restaurant cuisine in Kolkata, Mumbai and Bangalore among others.
