= Karim's =

International restaurant chain headquartered in Delhi, India

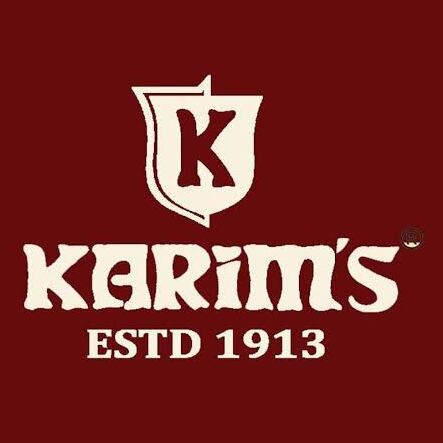
- Karim's logo

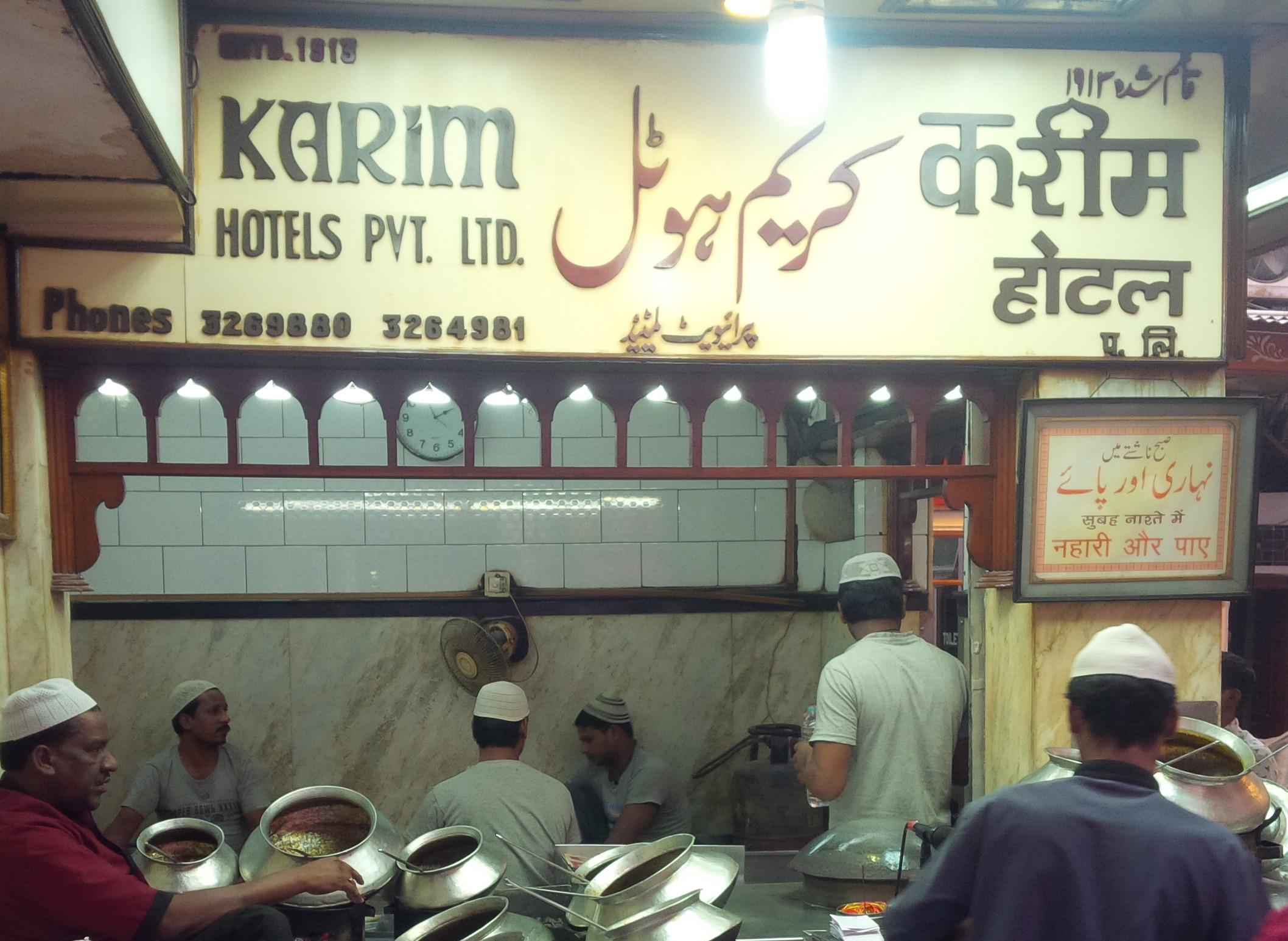
- Karim's (Headquarters)
- Native name: करीम होटल
- Type: Privately owned company
- Industry: Restaurant; Hospitality Industry
- Genre: Mughlai cuisine
- Founded: Delhi, India (1913)
- Founder: Haji Karimuddin
- Headquarters: Jama Masjid, Old Delhi, India
- Area served: India; United Arab Emirates
- Owner: Aivaz Asif

Karim's Hotel or Karim's (Hindi: करीम होटल) is an international chain of restaurants headquartered in Old Delhi in Delhi, India. Established in 1913, the original location in the Jama Masjid area of Delhi was founded by Haji Karimuddin, a cook from the royal court of Mughal Emperor Bahadur Shah Zafar. The restaurant has been described as Old Delhi's most famous culinary destination.

The chain serves Indian and Mughlai cuisine and operates more than 50 outlets in India and the United Arab Emirates.

== Flagship location ==
The historic flagship restaurant is located in Gali Kababian near Jama Masjid, Shahjahanabad since its inception in 1913. The restaurant is usually all days open from 9:00 am to 12:30 am.

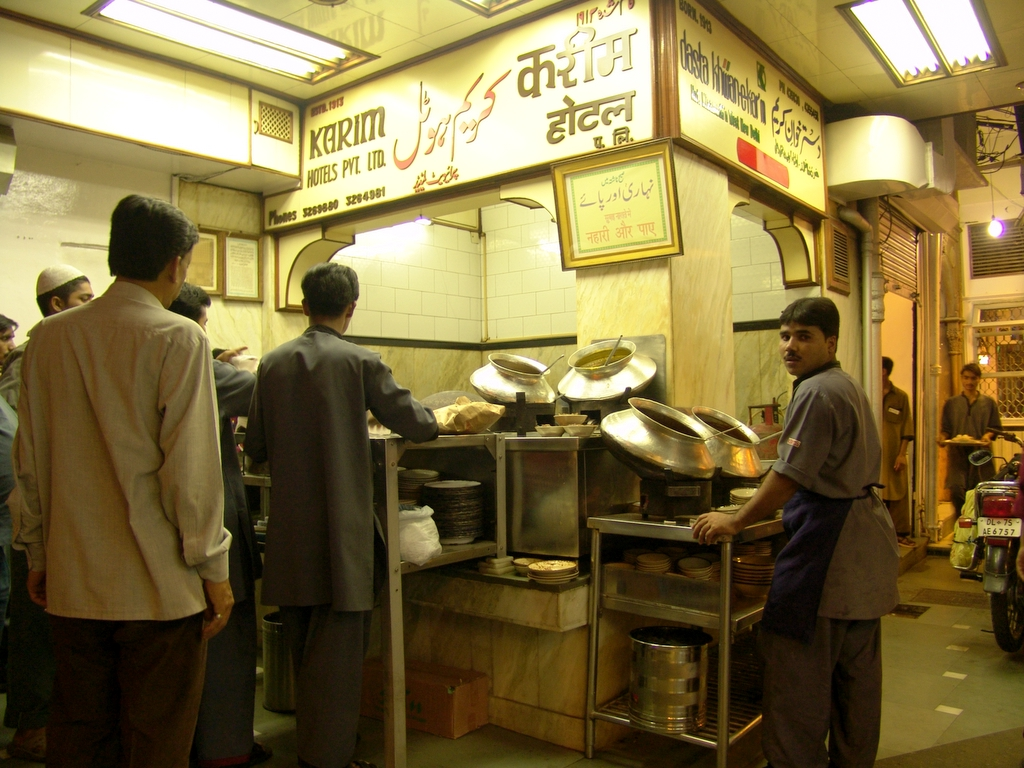
Karim’s, Old Delhi

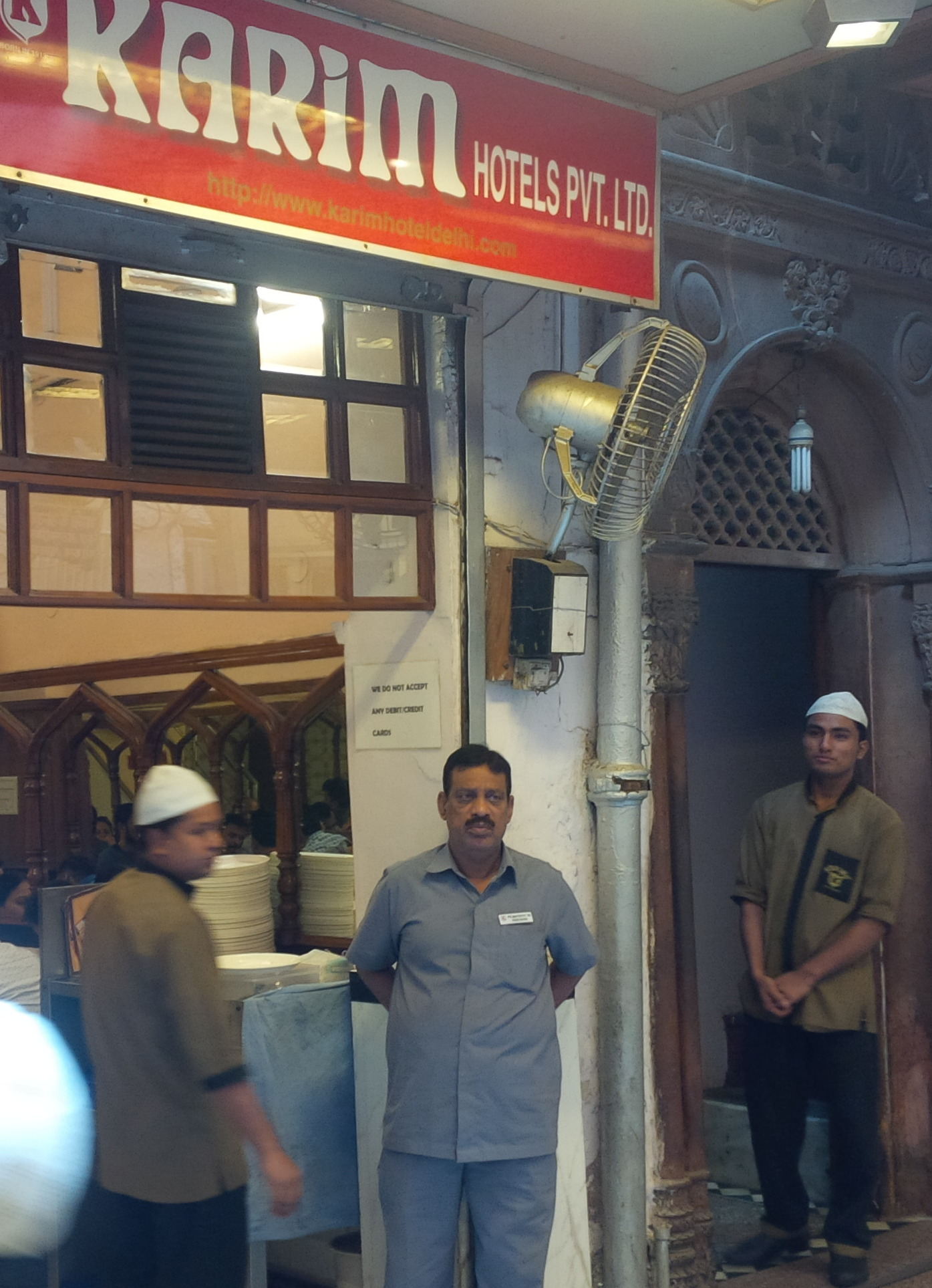
Dining Hall entry

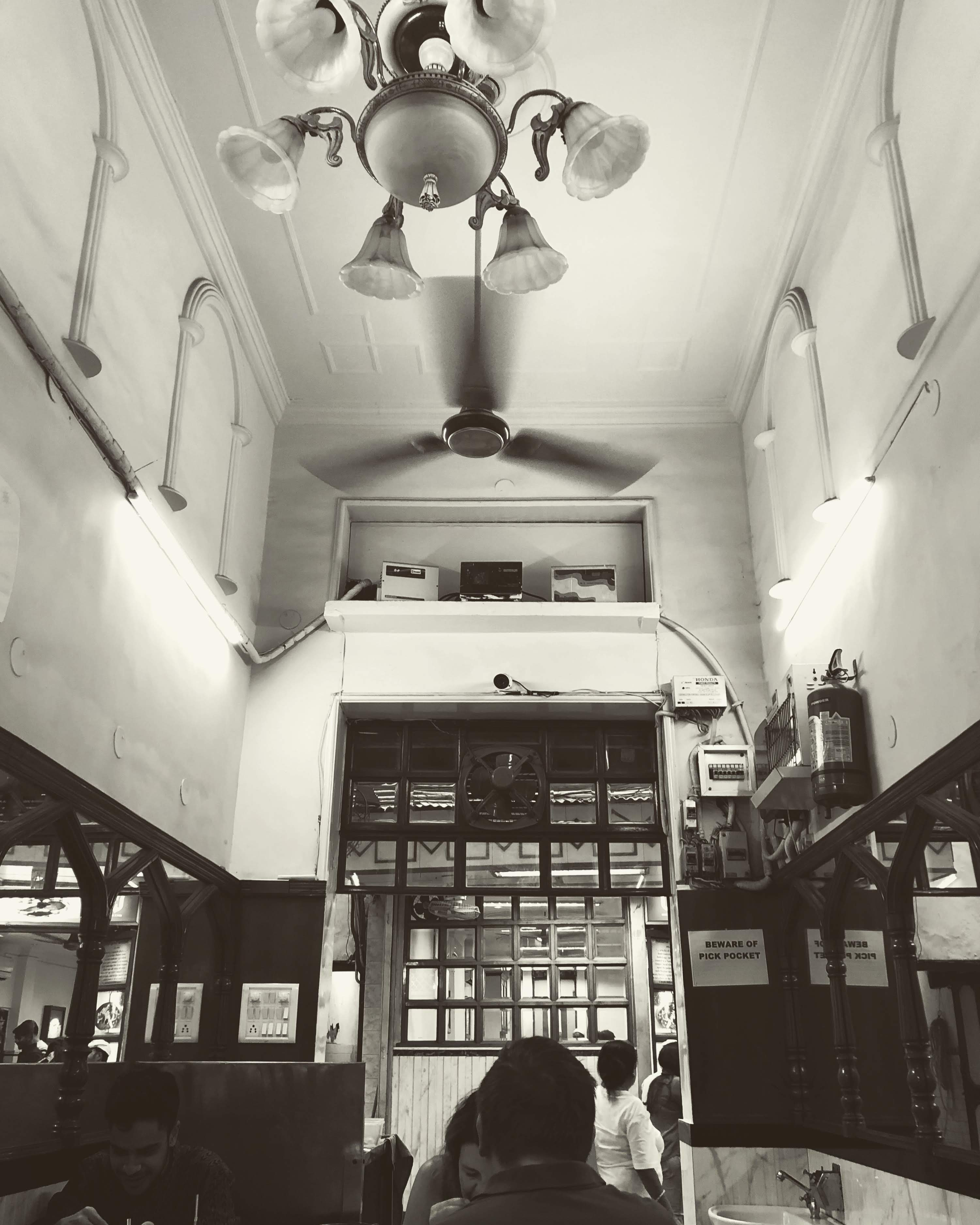
Interiors

== History ==
In the mid-19th century, Mohammed Aziz was a cook in the royal court of the Mughal Emperor, however after the Bahadur Shah Zafar was exiled, Aziz left the city for Meerut and later Ghaziabad. However, in 1911, when Delhi Durbar was held for the coronation of the King George V, one of Aziz's son Haji Karimuddin moved back to Delhi with an innovative idea of opening a Dhaba with the Mughal culinary, to cater the people coming from all over India to join the coronation.

Haji Karimuddin started the Dhaba selling just two items of Alu gosht (mutton with potatoes) and Daal (lentil curry) served with Rumali Roti.

In 1913, Haji Karimuddin established the flagship location of Karim Hotel in Gali Kababian, near Jama Masjid, Delhi saying, "I want to earn fame and money by serving the royal food to the common man". The restaurant opened its first branch in the 1990s in Nizamuddin West, followed by Kailash Colony, Noida, Gurgaon, Kamla Nagar, Dwarka, Delhi and all of the Delhi NCR region.

Currently, the fourth-generation restaurateur Aivaz Asif is operating the brand under the name of 'Karim Hotels Pvt. Ltd’ along with more than 50 outlets across India and United Arab Emirates.

== Dining ==
Karim's offers a variety of Mughlai dishes, including a selection of non-vegetarian options. The menu also features a range of Vegetarian cuisine items, along with sweets and desserts.

Non Vegetarian Main Course

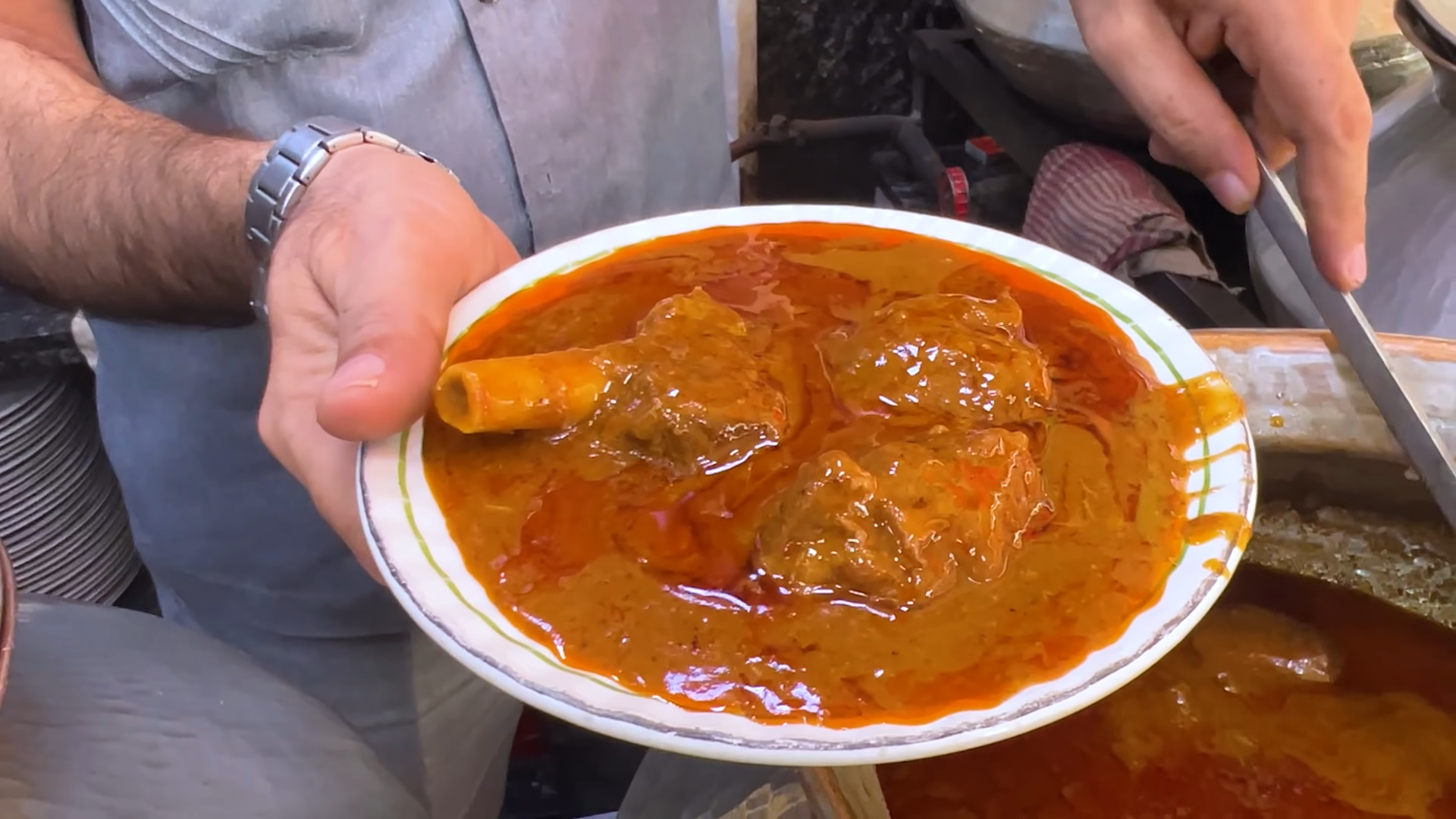
Nihari at Karim's, Jama Masjid, Old Delhi

- Biryani
- Different Curries of Chicken
- Karahi Gosht
- Kababs
- Keema
- Mutton Curries
- Mutton Nihari
- Pulao & Rice
- Rolls
- Soups
- Tikkas
- Qormas

Vegetarian Main Course

- Dal Makhani
- Jeera Rice
- Karahi Paneer
- Palak Paneer
- Paneer Roll
- Shahi Paneer

Dessert

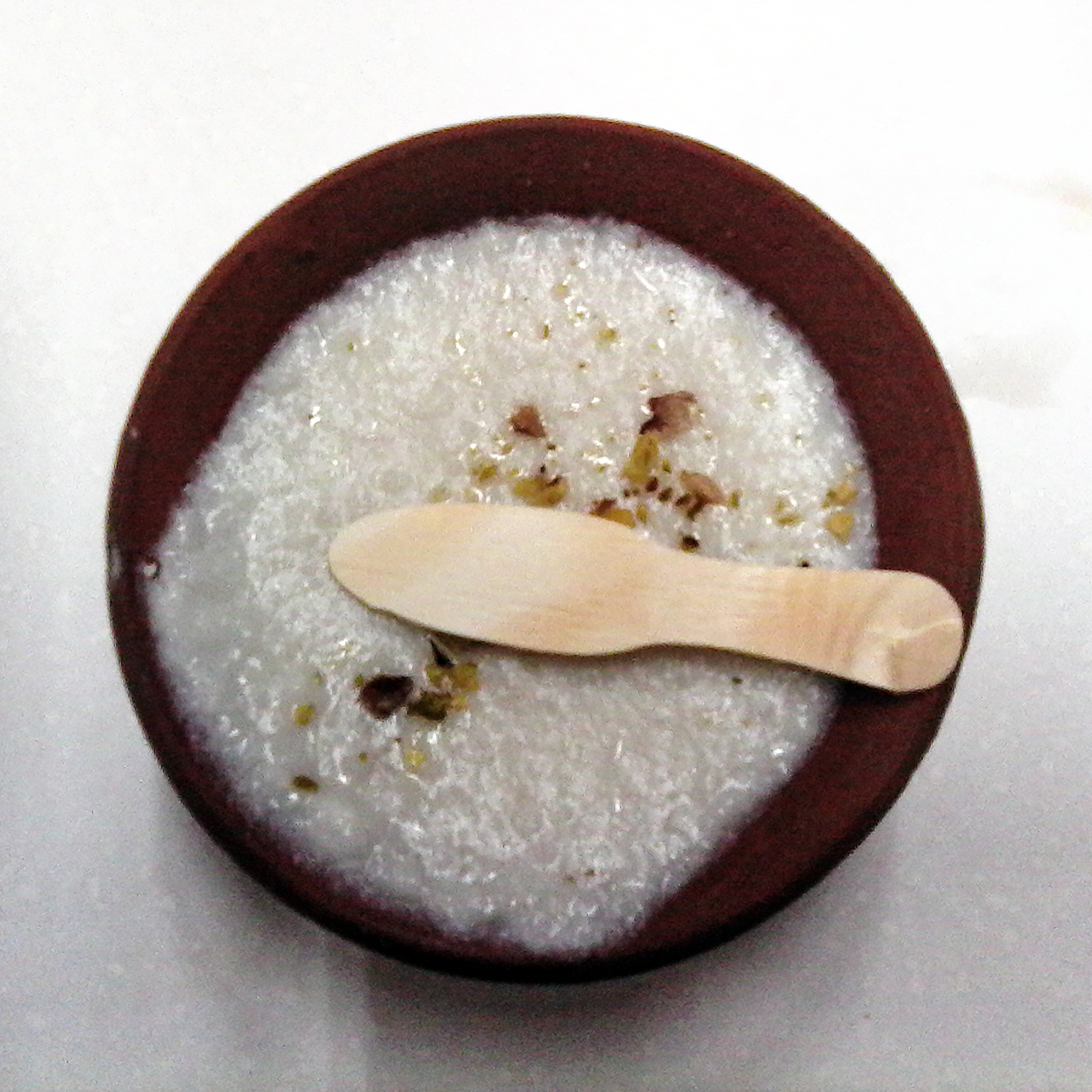
Kheer Benazir, at Karim’s Jama Masjid.

- Gajar ka Halwa
- Gulab Jamun
- Kheer Benazir
- Shahi Tukda

Breads

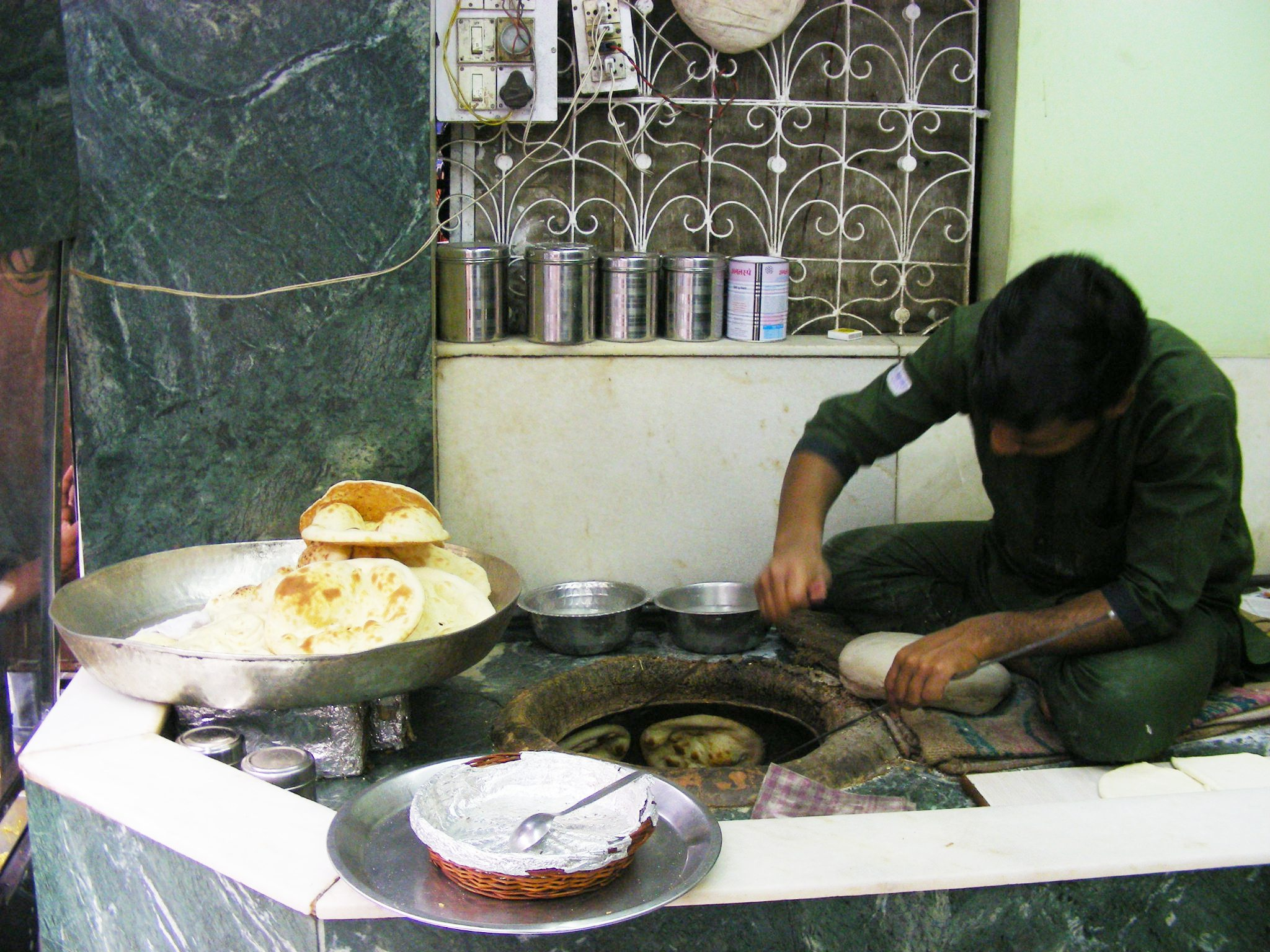
Tandoor at Karim’s Jama Masjid

- Baqarkhani
- Naan
- Rumaali Roti
- Tandoori Roti
