= Gokul Milk =

Indian dairy cooperative

Gokul (also known as Gokul Milk) is an Indian dairy cooperative headquartered in Kolhapur, Maharashtra. It is officially known as the Kolhapur District Cooperative Milk Producers Union and is the state's largest milk cooperative, delivering milk and dairy products to metro cities like Mumbai and Pune. In addition to milk, it also sells ghee and paneer.

== History ==
Gokul Milk Association was founded as a milk collective by Anandrao Patil Chuyekar in 1963. At that time, about 22 organisations (or farms) were part of the collective.

== See also ==
- Amul
- Nandini (brand)
