= Shahi paneer =

Rich, creamy tomato-based curry with Indian spices

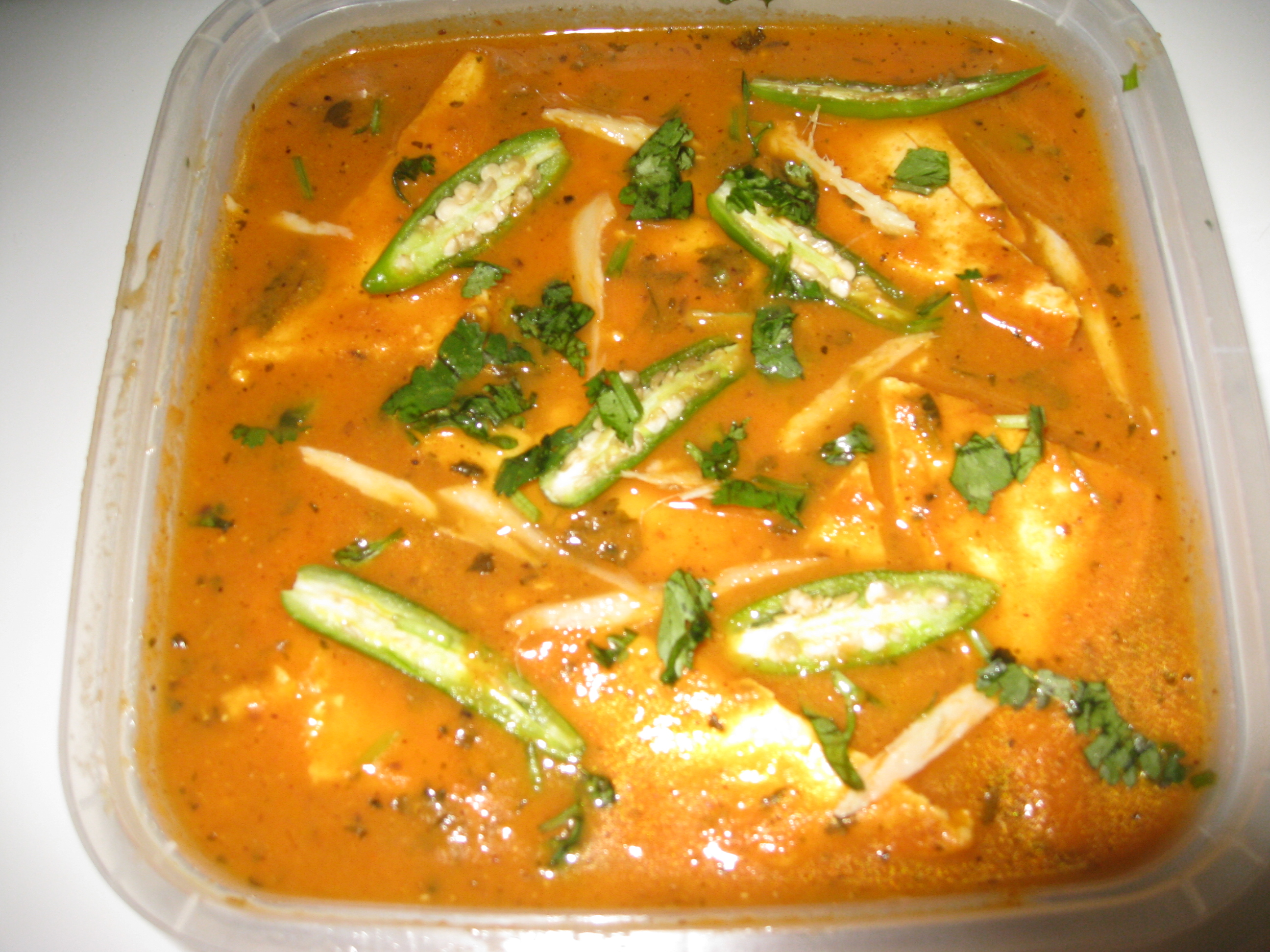
- Alternative names: Paneer rajwadi, chhena rajwadi
- Place of origin: Indian subcontinent
- Main ingredients: Paneer, cream, tomatoes, spices

Shahi paneer is a preparation of paneer in a creamy curry sauce. Native to the Indian subcontinent, it has a thick gravy with cream, tomatoes and Indian spices.

The dish is prepared by emulsifying tomatoes, onions, ground cashews, ghee (clarified butter), and cream into a smooth, rich curry, which is then simmered with cubes of paneer and a blend of aromatic spices.

Similar dishes include paneer butter masala and kadai paneer. Paneer butter masala differs from shahi paneer in that whole spices are used in paneer butter masala, whereas shahi paneer generally has a sweeter taste by comparison.

== See also ==
- Paneer makhani
- List of Indian dishes
