= Tikka (food) =

Type of Indian or Pakistani food

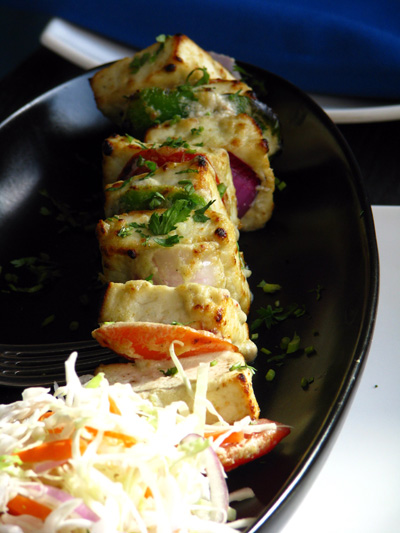
- Paneer Tikka served in a restaurant in Mumbai, India.
- Course: Hors d'oeuvre
- Region or state: Indian subcontinent
- Serving temperature: Hot
- Main ingredients: Meat, paneer, marinade, yogurt, spices or curry
- Variations: Chicken Tikka Masala, Paneer Tikka Masala

Tikka (pronounced [ʈɪkkaː]) is a dish consisting of pieces of meat or vegetarian alternatives whose origins are traced back to ancient Babylon. The term 'tikka' was given in the Mughal era. It is made by marinating the pieces in spices and yogurt, and cooking them in a tandoor. Tikka is popular throughout the Indian subcontinent and also in the United Kingdom.

== Etymology ==
Tikka is a Chagatai word which has been commonly combined with the Hindi-Urdu word masala — itself derived from Arabic — with the combined word originating from British English. The Chagatai word tikka itself is a derivation of the Common Turkic word tikkü, which means "piece" or "chunk".

== Origin ==
The precise origin of the dish is uncertain. Recipes for cooked meat enriched with spices and mixed within a sauce date back to 1700 BCE found on cuneiform tablets near Babylon, credited to the Sumerians. During the Mughal dynasty, the Mughals called "boneless pieces of cooked meat" Tikka.

There are different varieties of the dish, both meat inclusive and vegetarian. Generally, the dish is defined as "a dish of small pieces of meat or vegetables marinated in a spice mixture".

== Preparation ==
Tikka consists of boneless pieces of meat or vegetarian alternatives such as paneer, which are marinated in spices and yogurt and subsequently strung through a skewer to be cooked. It is generally cooked in a tandoor and served dry.

== Variations ==
=== Indian-subcontinent variations ===
The Sub-continent, especially Pakistani, variations of Tikka are the roots of the Western variations, including Malai Boti, Chicken tikka and Paneer tikka, which are generally served dry.

=== Cross-cultural variations ===
Regular chicken and paneer tikka have been combined with dishes from other cultures such as Mexican cuisine to create hybrid dishes such as Tikka Masala Burritos, which are served with either chicken or paneer as their main ingredient.

== Popularity ==
=== In Britain ===
A study was undertaken in the 1990s that revealed British interest in foreign food, with chicken tikka being a favourite filling in the British Rail sandwich.

=== In Pakistan ===
A variation of Tikka, like Malai Boti, Chicken Tikka, Balochi Tikka, Achari Tikka, Darbari Tikka, Beef Kabab Tikka Fry, inspired by Mughal era cuisine, are commonly found in Pakistan.

== Preservation and quality ==
=== Paneer tikka ===
Paneer tikka has a shelf-life of 1–2 days, which can be increased to 28 days using modified atmosphere packaging (MAP) technology. Vacuum packaging is most effective as it is able to limit chemical changes during storage, increasing the refrigerated shelf-life of paneer tikka to 40 days.
