= Matar paneer =

Indian cheese and peas dish

Mattar paneer
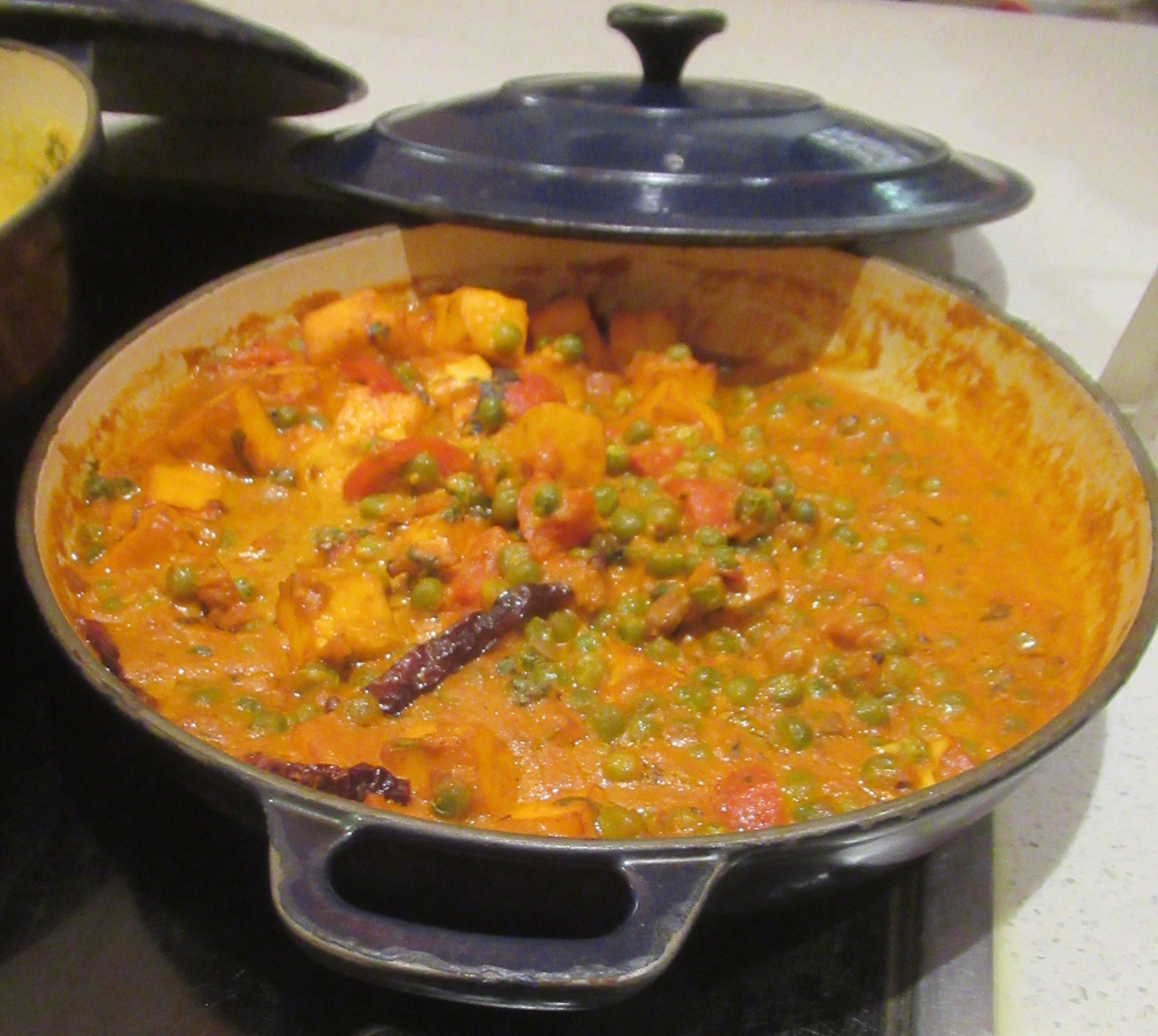
- A dish of mattar paneer
- Alternative names: matar paneer, mutter paneer
- Place of origin: India
- Region or state: North India
- Main ingredients: Paneer, peas, tomato-based sauce, garam masala spice mix

Mattar paneer (Hindi: मटर पनीर), also known as matar paneer, muttar paneer, and mutter paneer, is a modern restaurant-style vegetarian North Indian dish consisting of peas and paneer in a tomato-based sauce, spiced with garam masala.

It is often served with rice and an Indian type of bread (naan, paratha, poori, or roti, depending on the region). Various other ingredients are often added, such as potato (aloo), corn, yogurt or cream.

== Similar dishes ==
- Chhanar koraishutir dalna is a Bengali-style chhena (cottage cheese) gravy recipe prepared with green peas and potatoes.
- Chhena matar tarkari is a dish originating from Odisha.

== Gallery ==
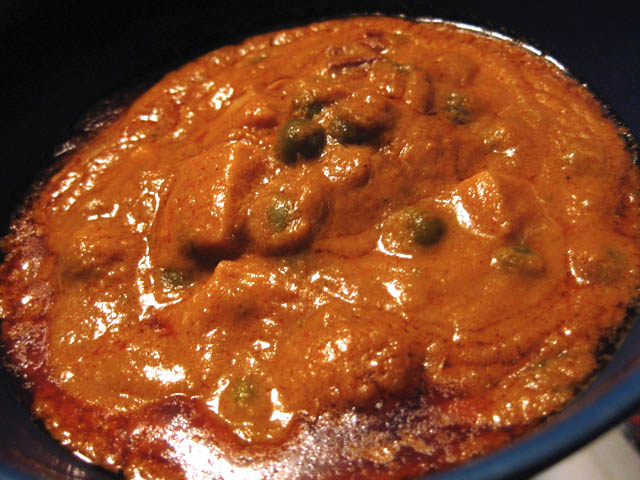

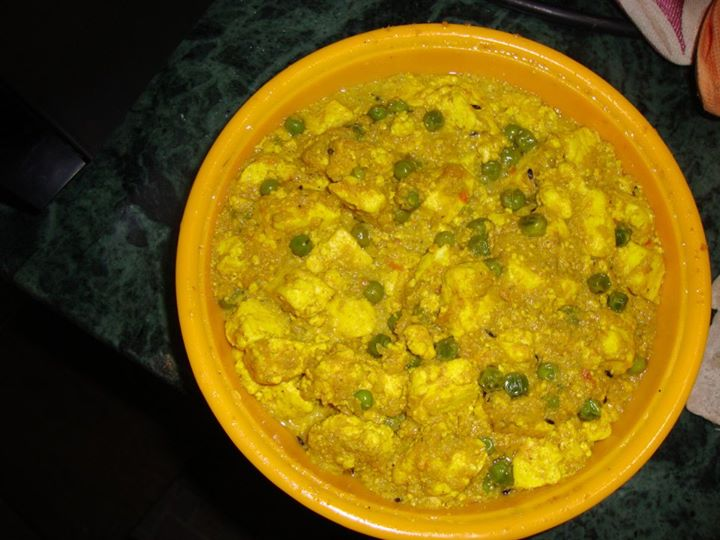

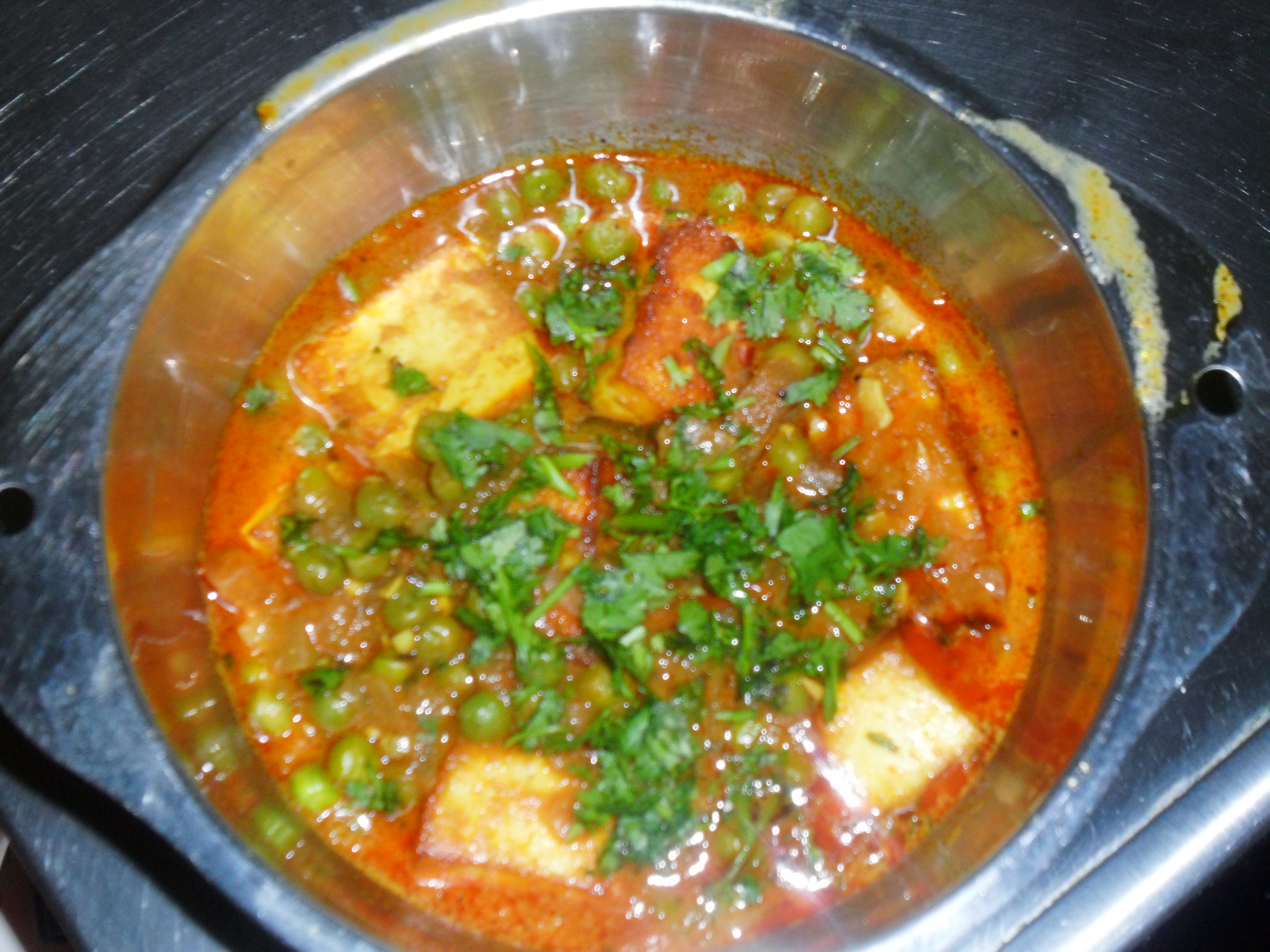

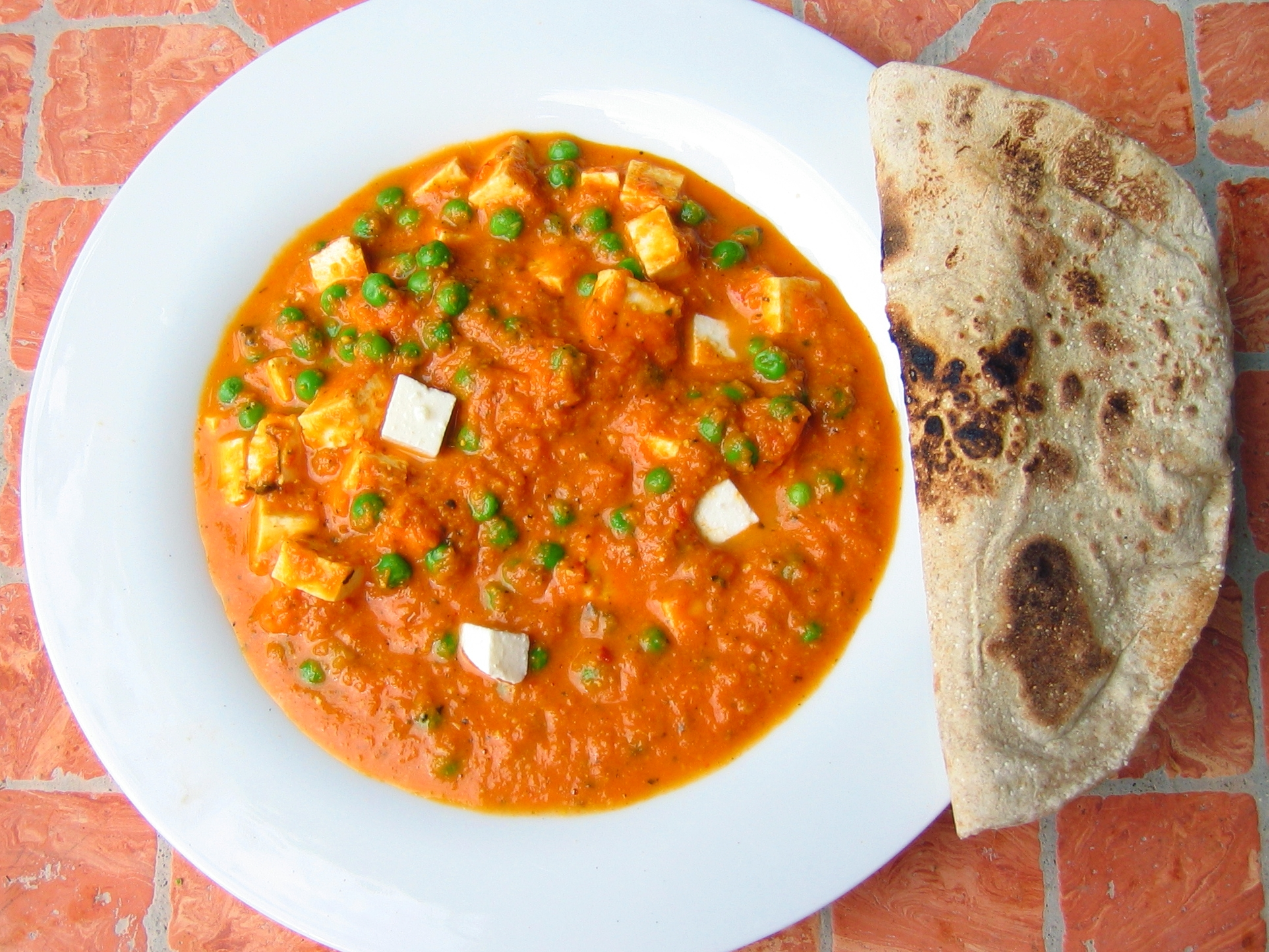

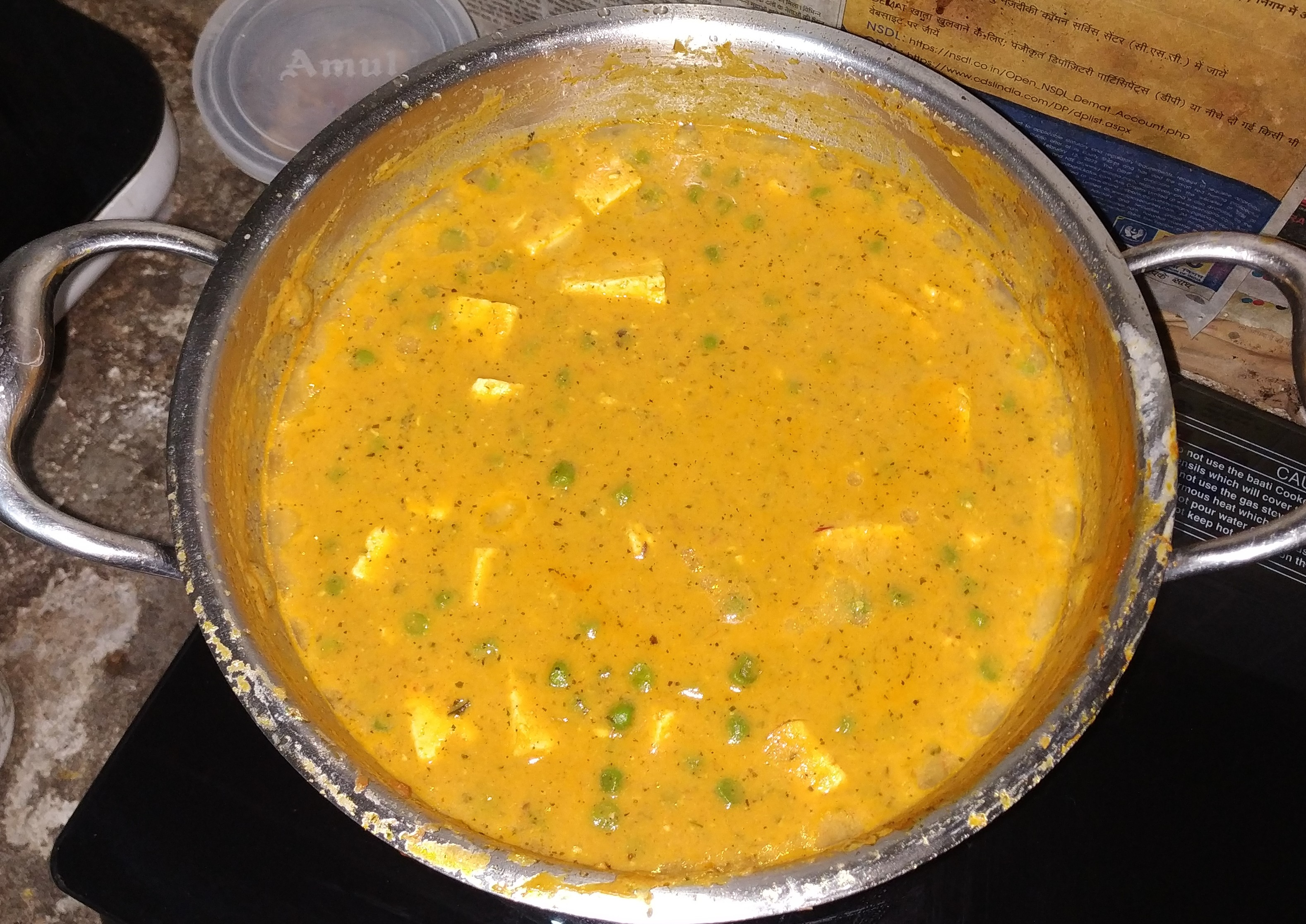

== See also ==
- List of legume dishes
