= Paneer tikka =

Indian cuisine

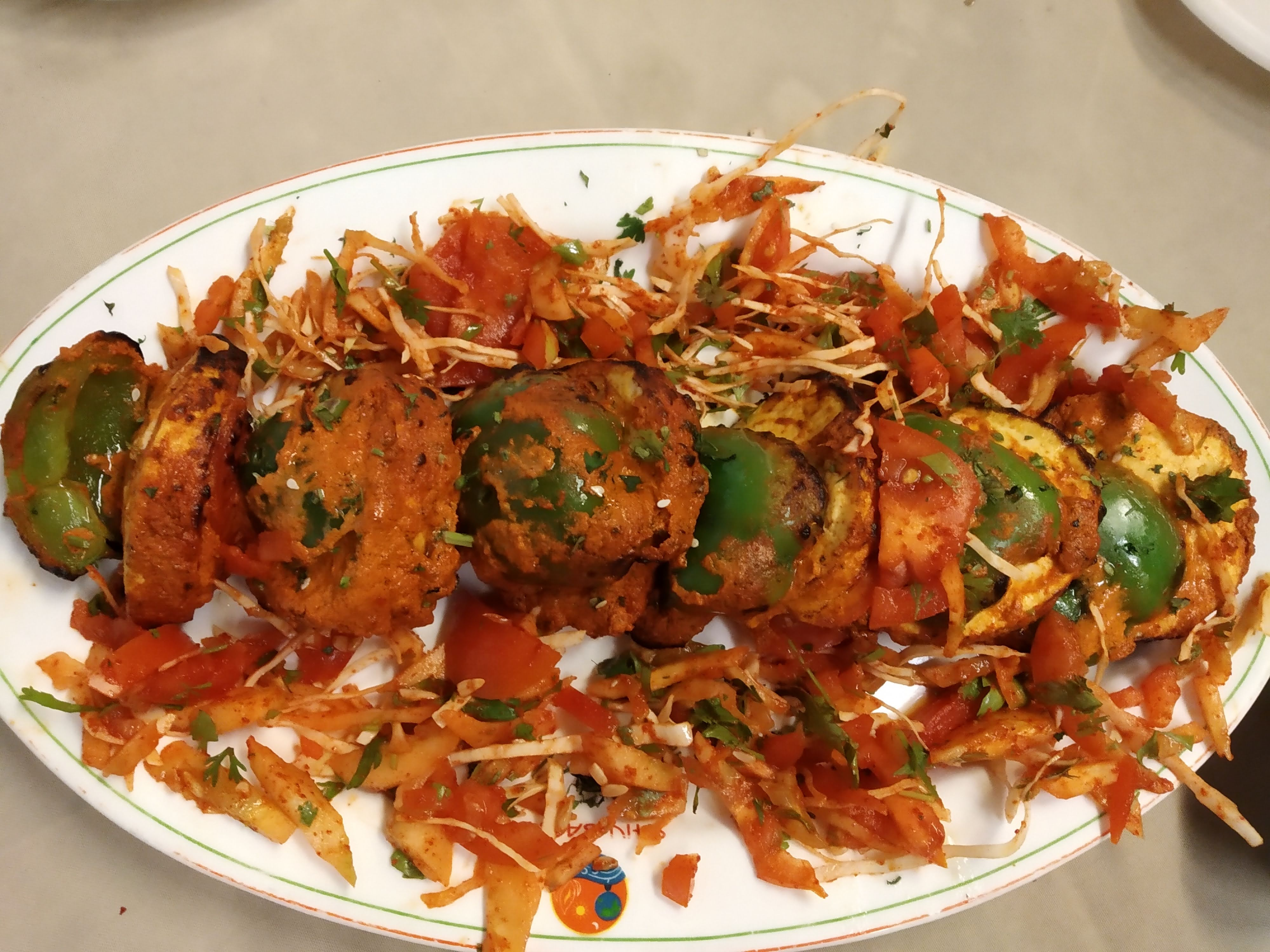
- Paneer tikka, as served in a restaurant in Goa, India
- Alternative names: Paneer Soola or Chhena Soola
- Course: Hors d'oeuvre
- Place of origin: India
- Region or state: Northern India
- Associated cuisine: India
- Serving temperature: Hot
- Main ingredients: Paneer, spices
- Variations: Chicken tikka

Paneer tikka or Paneer Soola or Chhena Soola is an Indian dish made from chunks of paneer or chhena marinated in spices and grilled in a tandoor. It is a vegetarian alternative to chicken tikka and other meat dishes. The dish is popular in India and is also available in countries with an Indian diaspora.

== Preparation ==
Chunks of paneer, a type of fresh cheese, are marinated in spices and then arranged on a stick with capsicums (bell peppers), onions and tomatoes. These sticks are grilled in a tandoor, and the dish is served hot, seasoned with lemon juice and chaat masala. It is sometimes accompanied by salad or mint chutney. Tikka dishes traditionally go well with mint chutney. The paneer, though tender, has a crisp singe on the surface.

== Variations ==
When paneer tikka is served with a sauce, it is called paneer tikka masala. It is also served in a wrap, as a paneer tikka roll, where the paneer tikka is wrapped in an Indian flatbread and served. A variant of paneer tikka is also made as a kebab.

Variations include Kashmiri paneer tikka, where the paneer is stuffed with chopped almonds and grilled, a variety of Chinese food, paneer tikka masala chow mein and dosa stuffed with paneer tikka.

International fast-food chains in India have also incorporated paneer tikka into their menus. For example, Pizza Hut and Domino's offer a paneer tikka topping on their pizzas, whereas Subway offers a paneer tikka sandwich and McDonald's has a paneer tikka wrap on its menu. ITC's Bingo brand of potato chips has experimented with a paneer tikka flavour of chips. Before that, in 2003, Nestle's Maggi experimented with a ready-to-cook variety of paneer tikka. Other companies also offer spice mixes and ready-to-eat variants of paneer tikka.

== Gallery ==
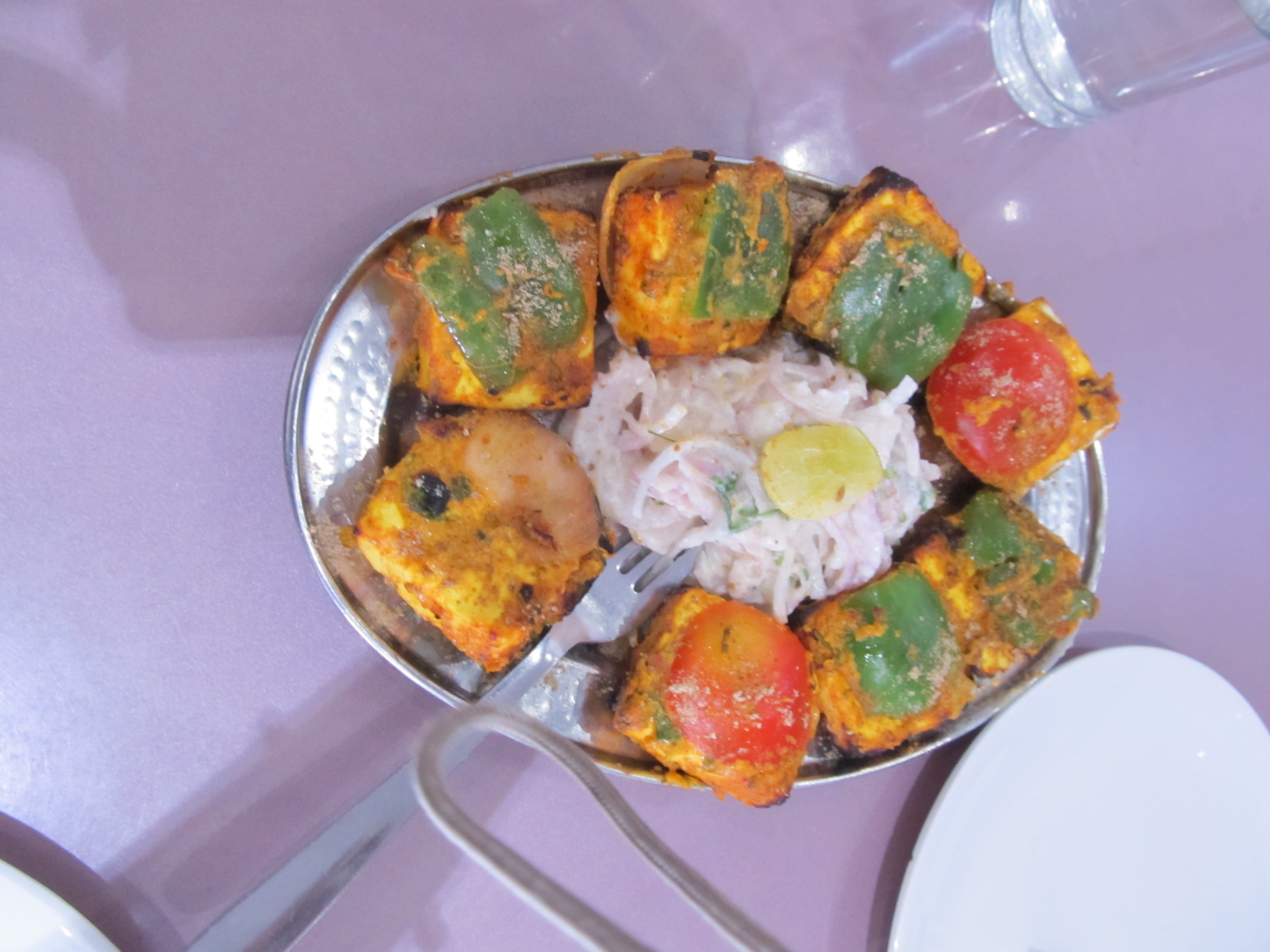

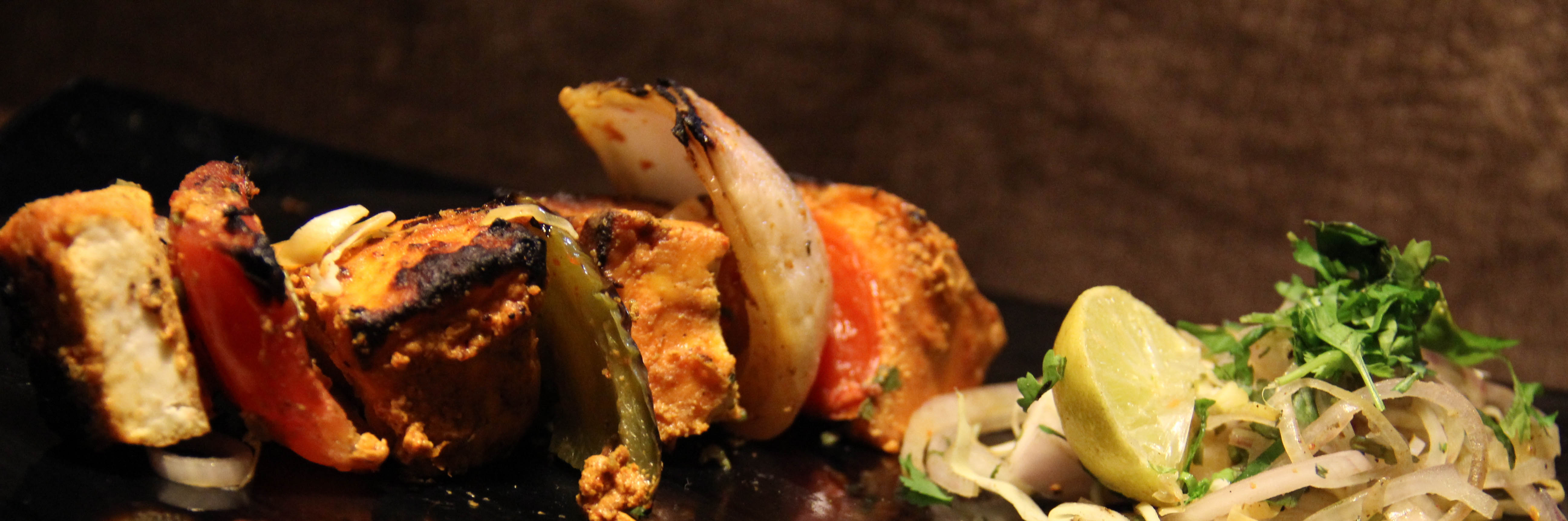

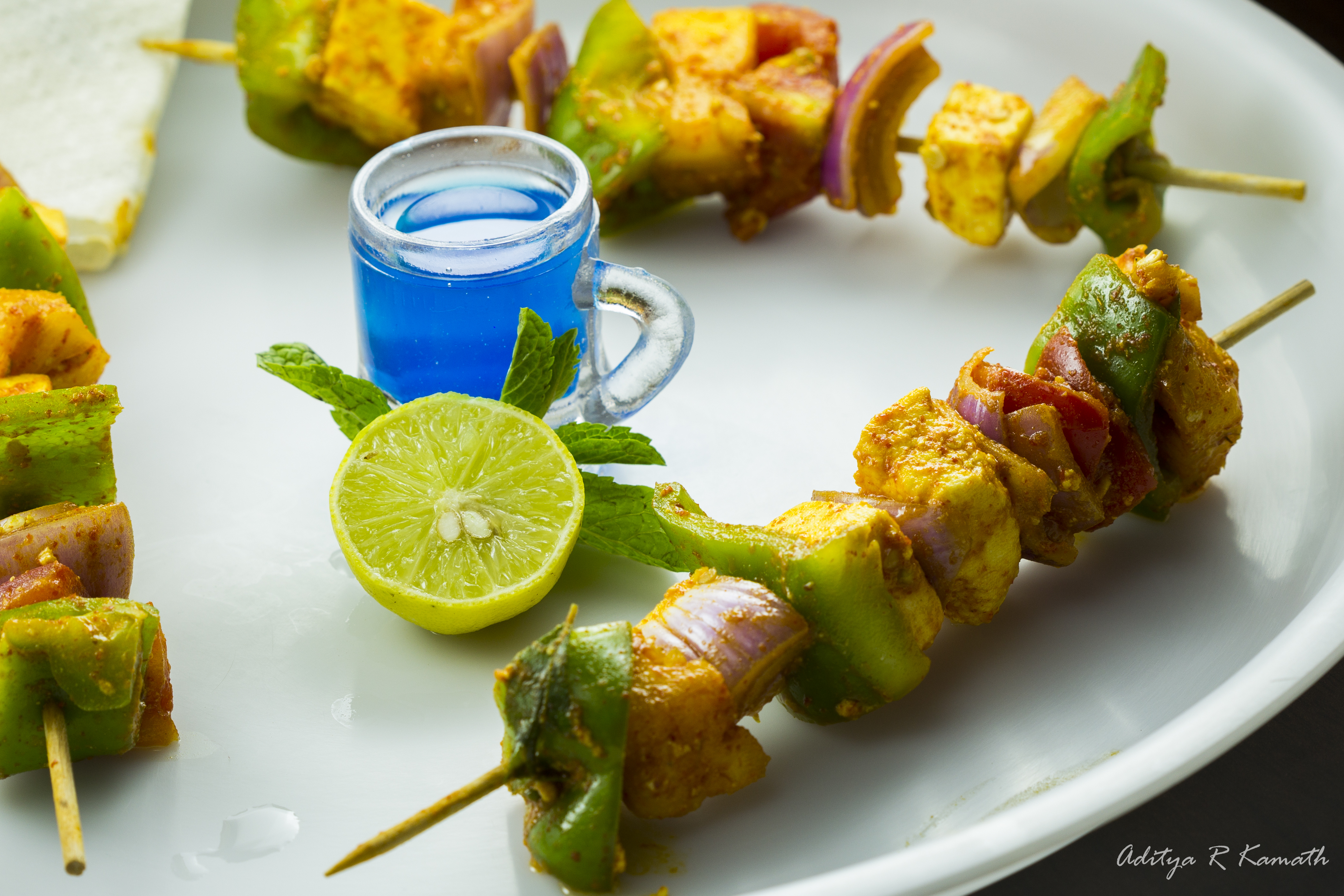

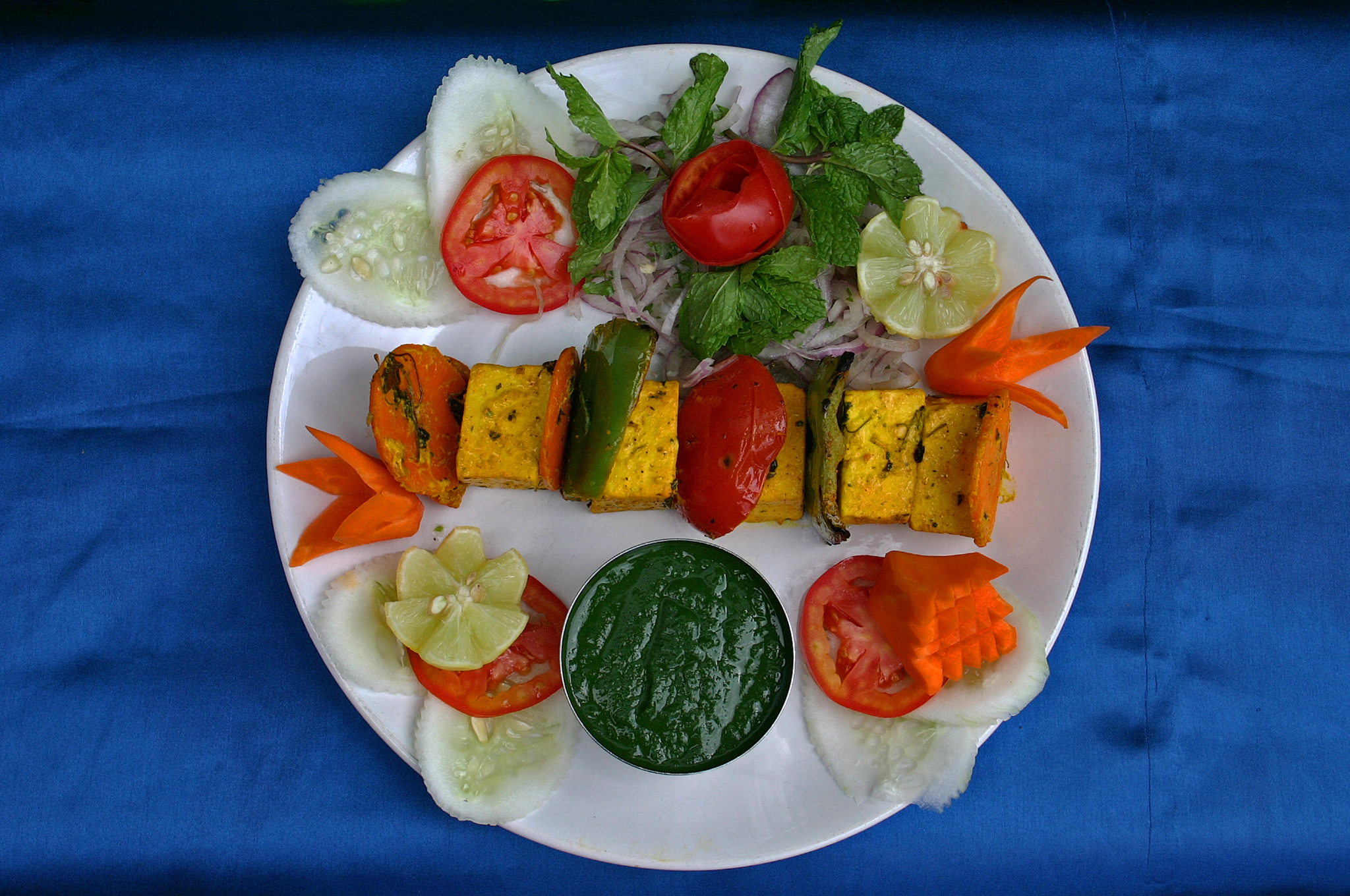

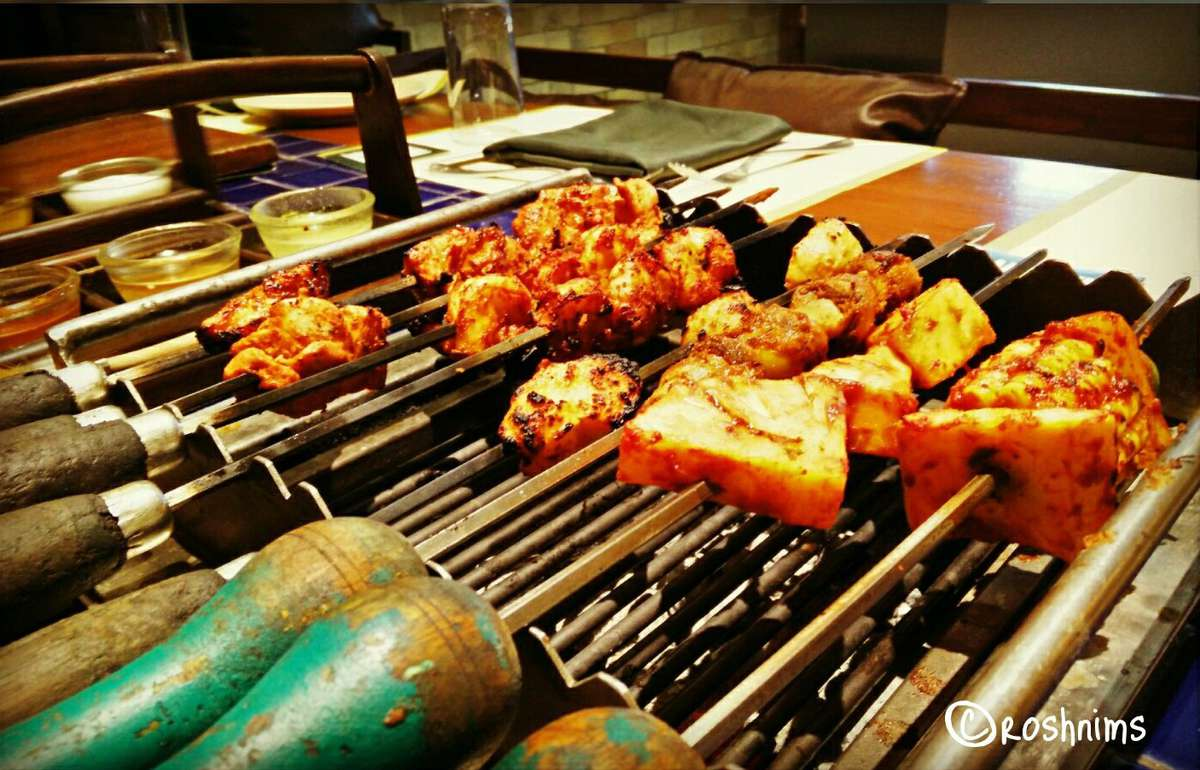

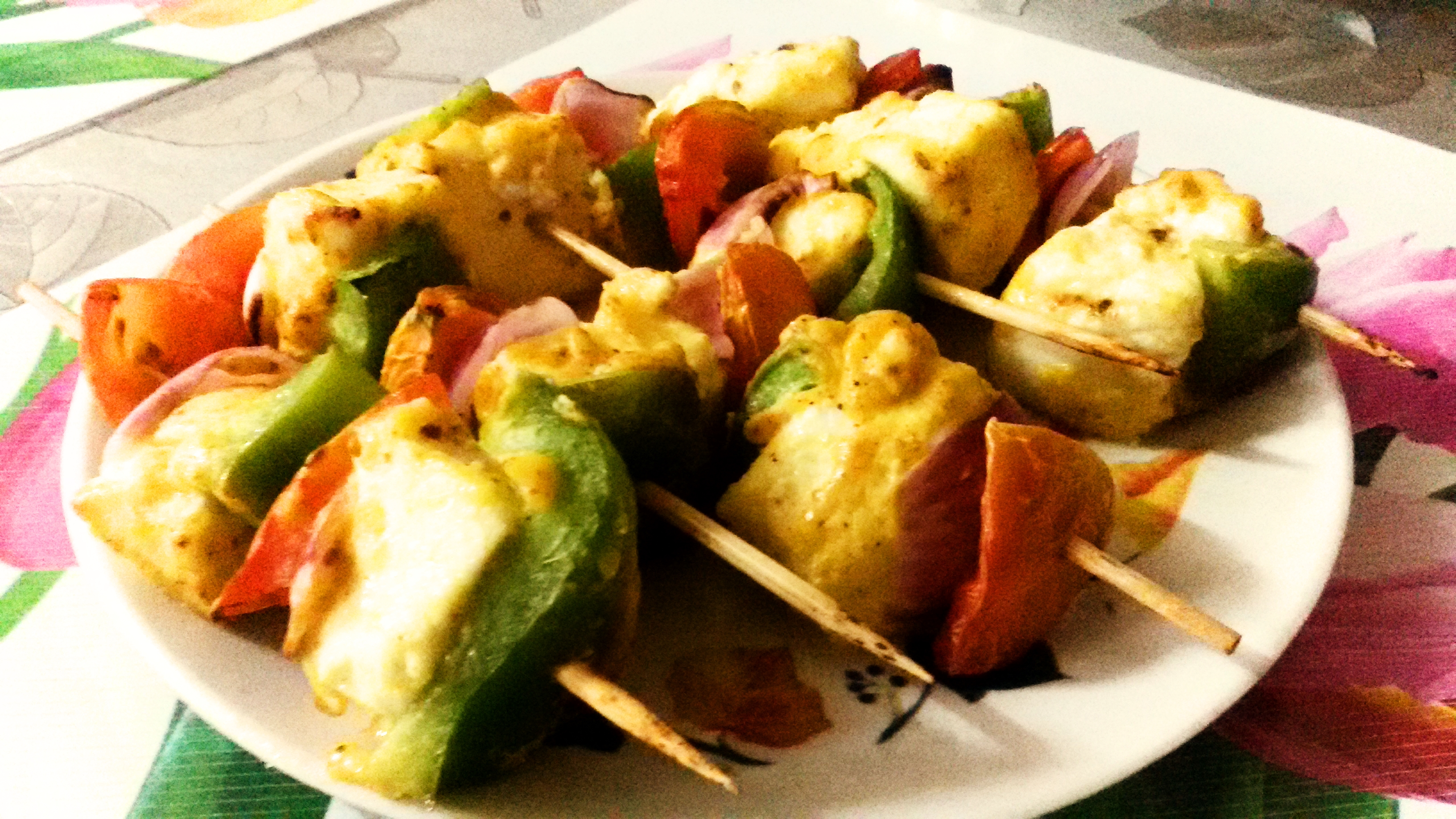

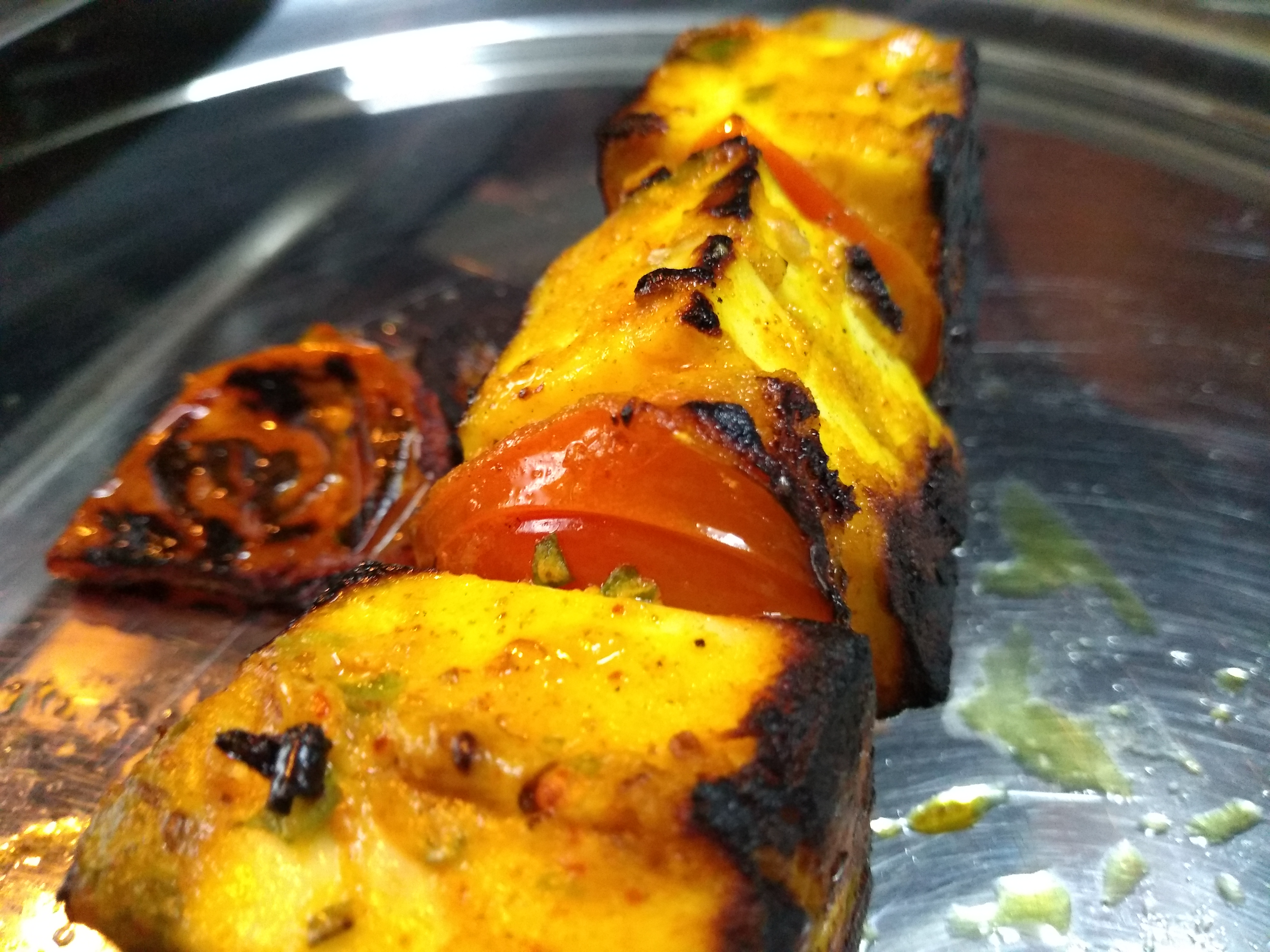

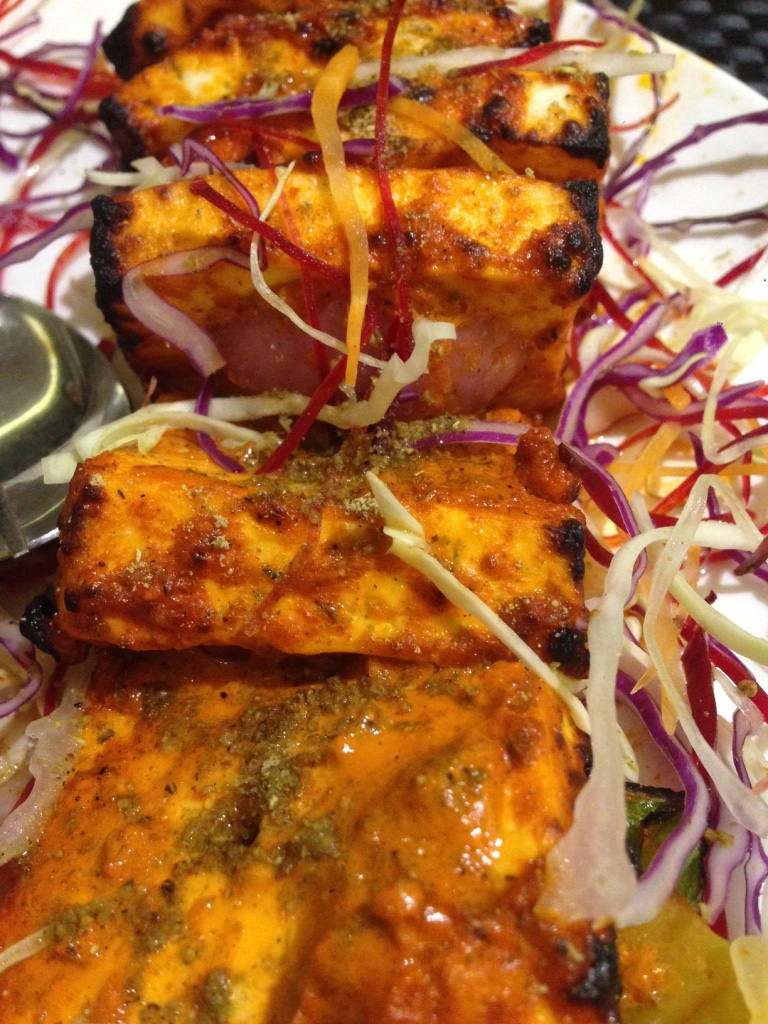

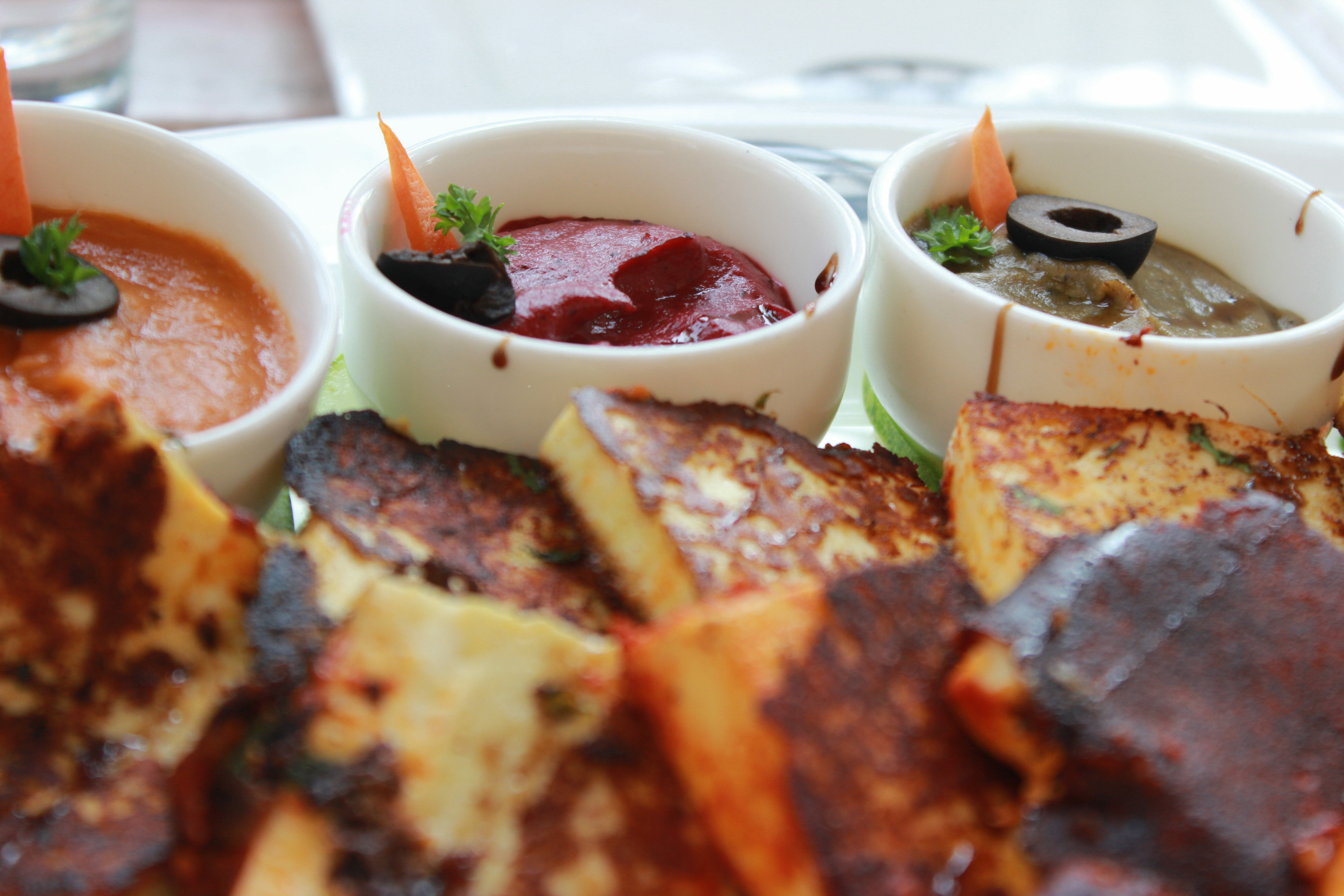

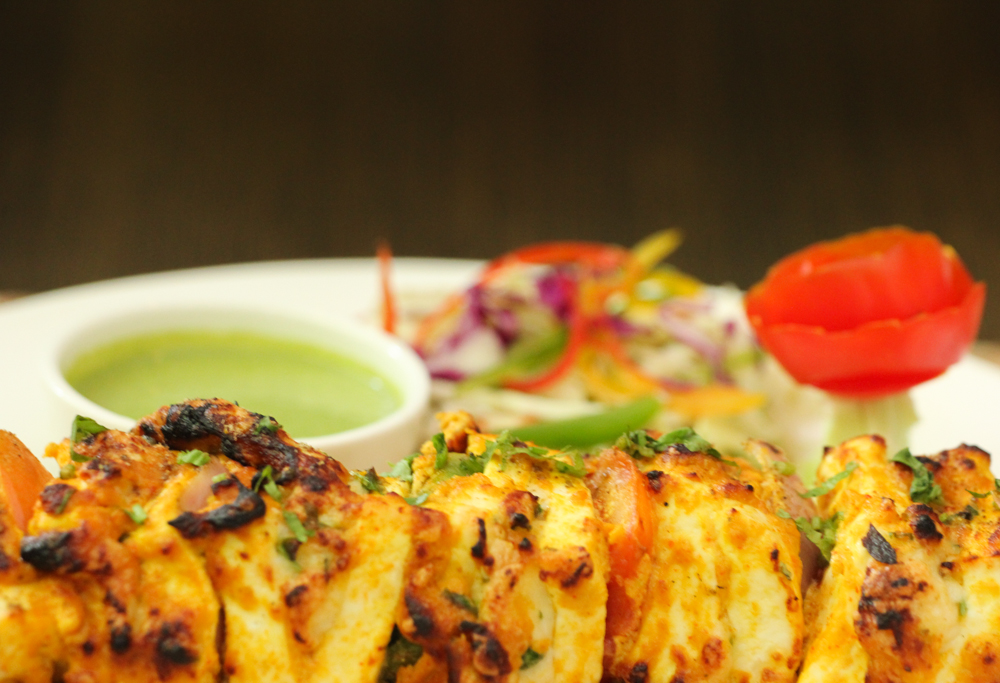

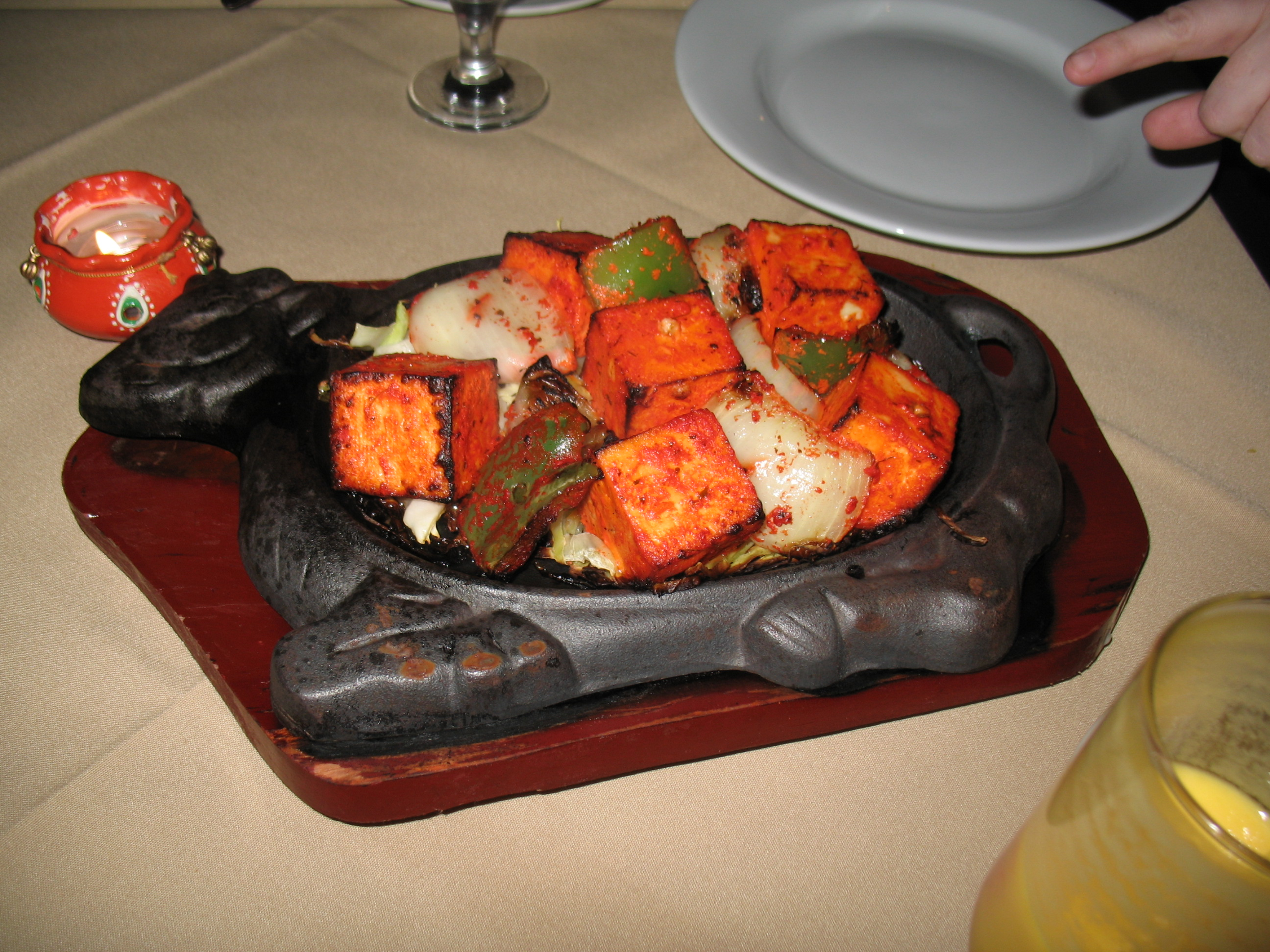
