= Kadai paneer =

Indian dish

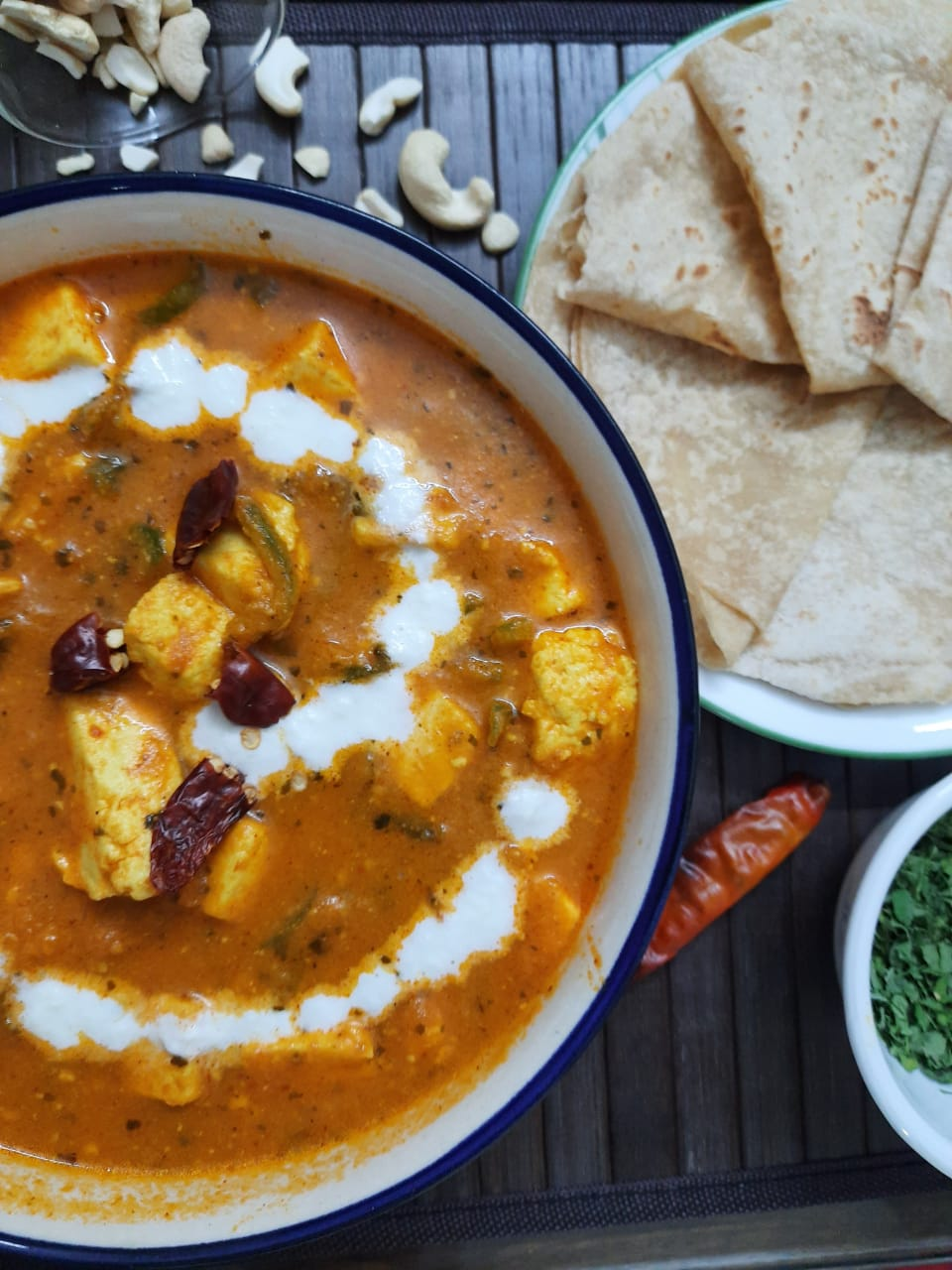
Kadai paneer

Kadai paneer (or kadhai paneer) is an Indian dish made by cooking paneer and bell peppers in a freshly ground spice powder. It is usually served with buttered naan, paratha, roti, jeera rice, or steamed basmati rice.

It is of two types, gravy and dry.

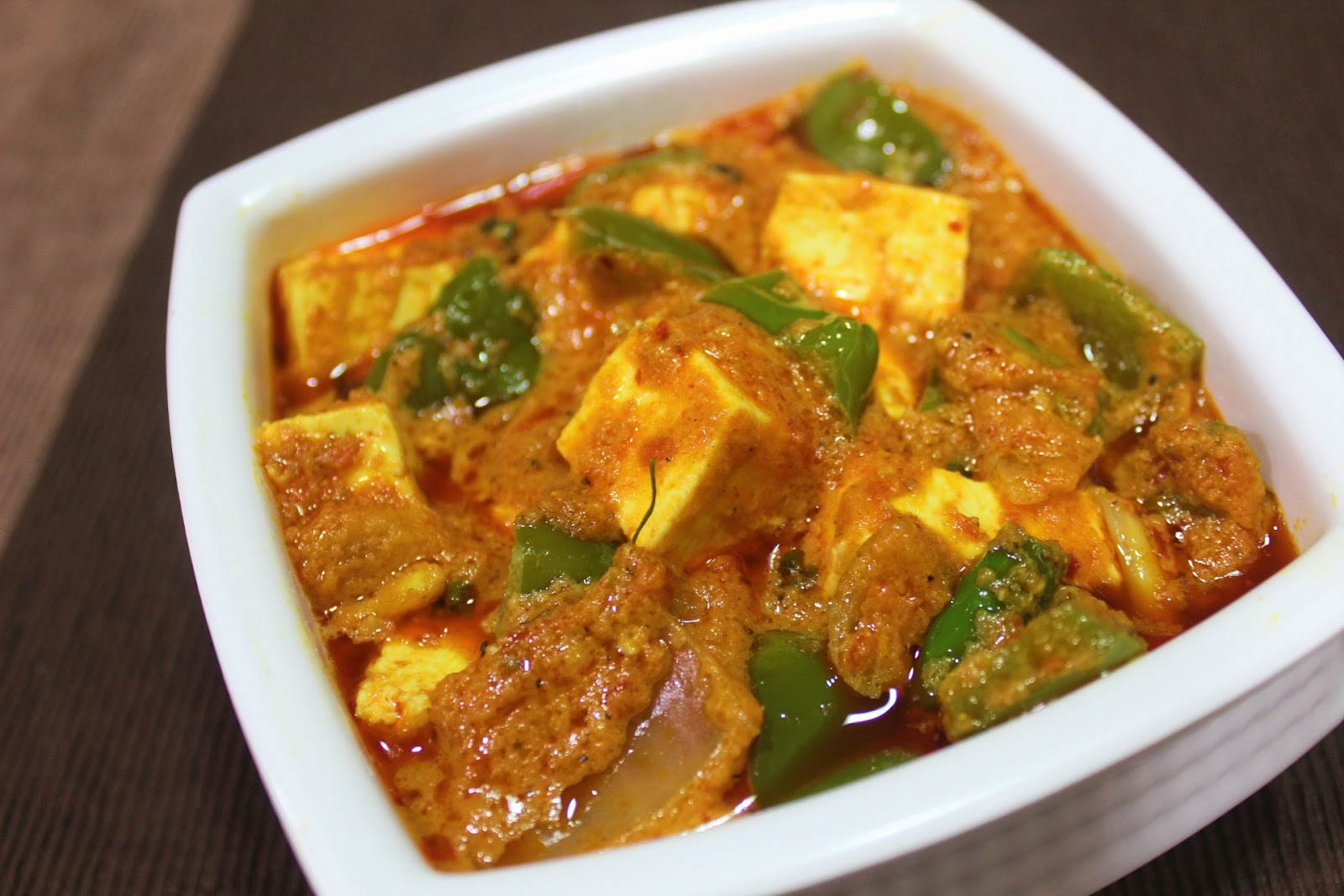
Kadai paneer

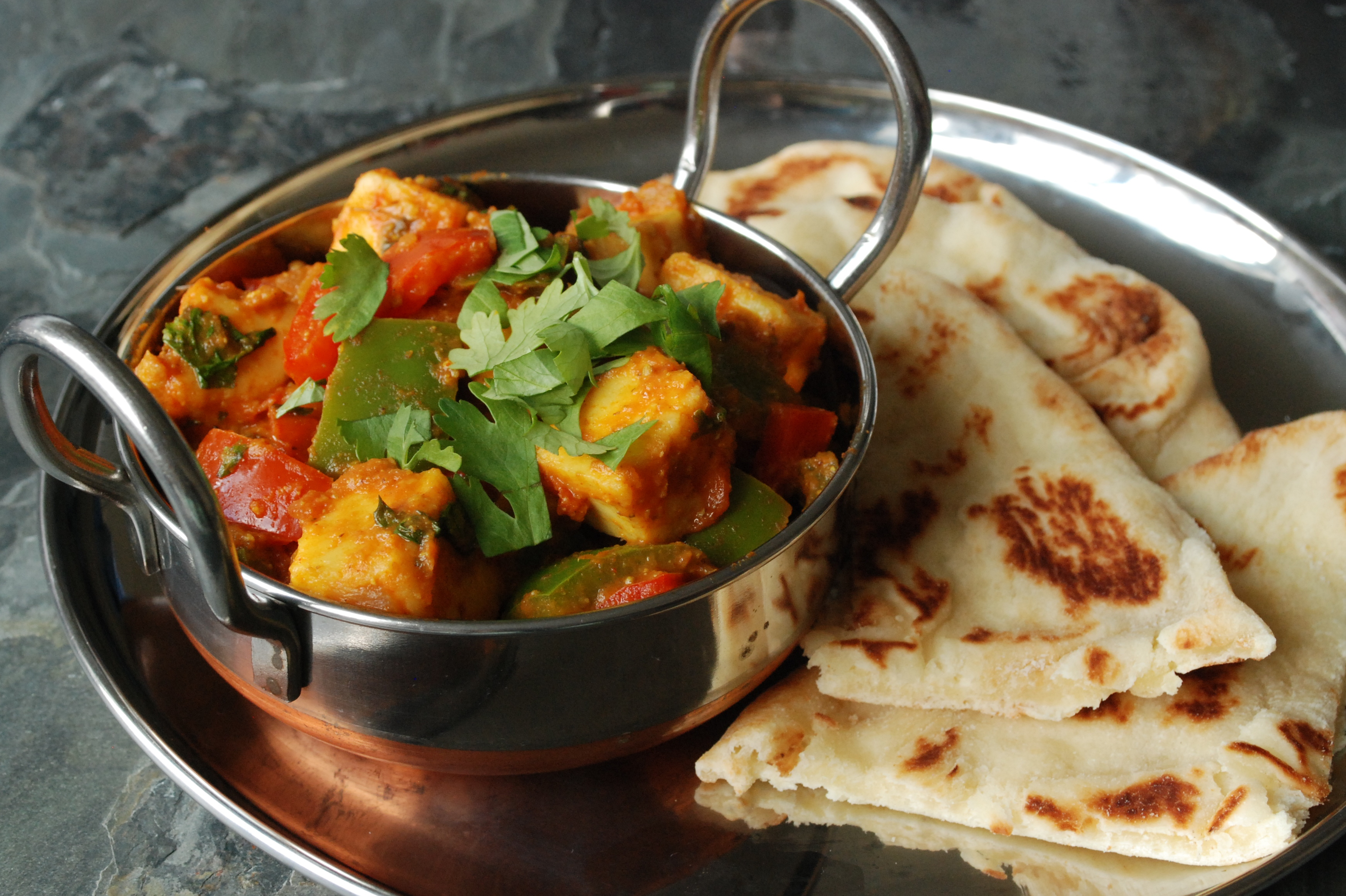
Kadai paneer with naan
