= Paneer =

Type of fresh cheese in South Asian cuisine

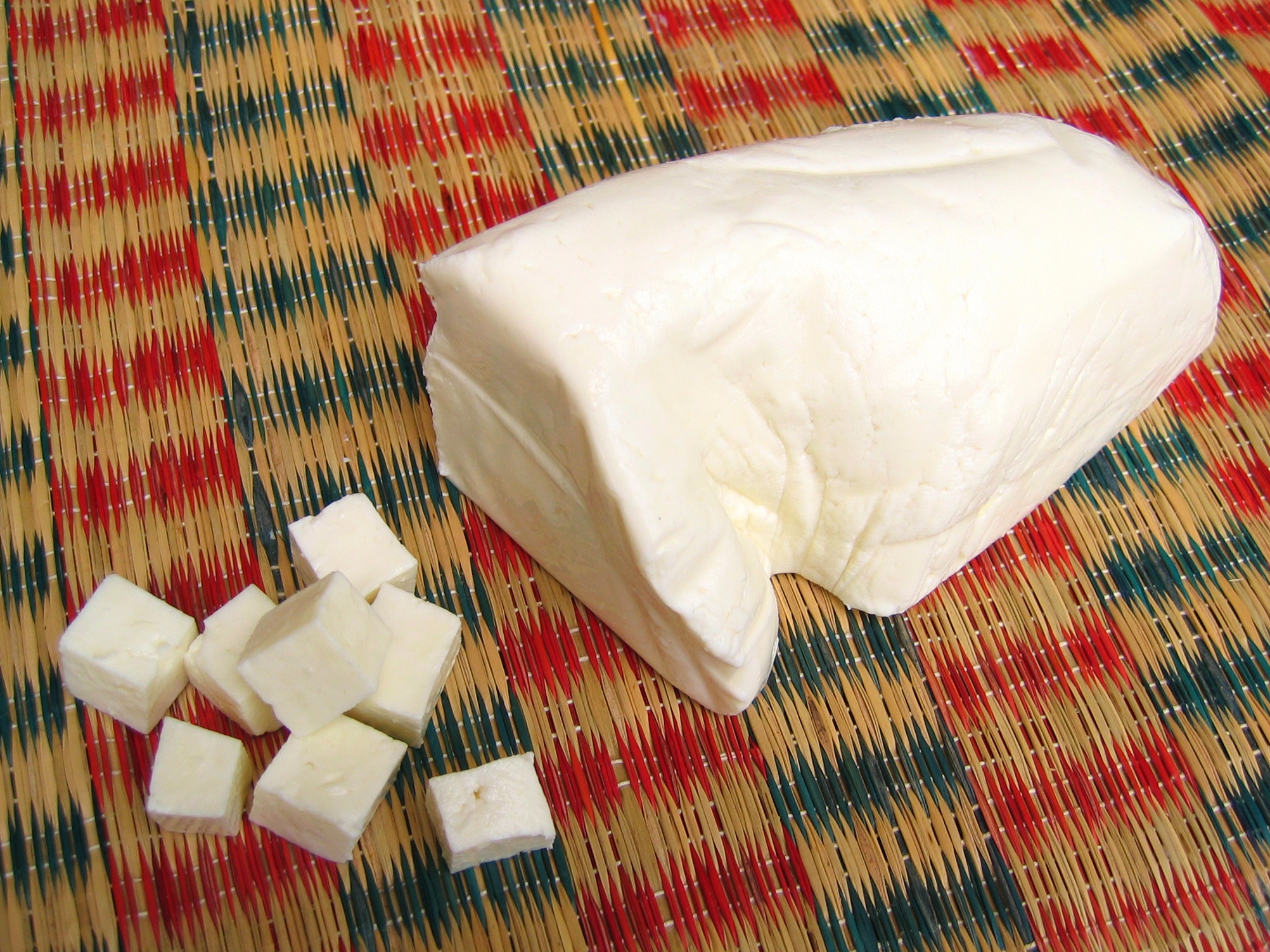
- Paneer
- Alternative names: Ponir, Indian cottage cheese
- Type: Cheese
- Region or state: South Asia
- Main ingredients: Cow milk or buffalo milk

Paneer (pronounced [pəˈniːr]) is a fresh acid-set cheese, common in South Asian cuisine, made from cow milk or buffalo milk. It is a non-aged, non-melting soft cheese made by curdling milk with an acid, such as lemon juice or citric acid. Paneer is predominantly used in north Indian dishes and is commonly used throughout India due to its versatility as an ingredient in diverse dishes.

Its origins are not known, with doubtful references in the Vedas of ancient India; other hypotheses include a Persian origin and a Portuguese introduction of the use of acid to form cheeses in the 17th century.

== Etymology ==
The word paneer entered English from the Hindi-Urdu term panīr, which comes from Persian panir (پنیر) 'cheese', which comes from Old Iranian. Armenian panir (պանիր), Azerbaijani pəndir, Bengali ponir (পনির), Turkish peynir, Turkmen peýnir, Kurdish penîr, and Pashto panir (پنیر) all derive from Persian panir, and refer to cheese of any type.

== History ==
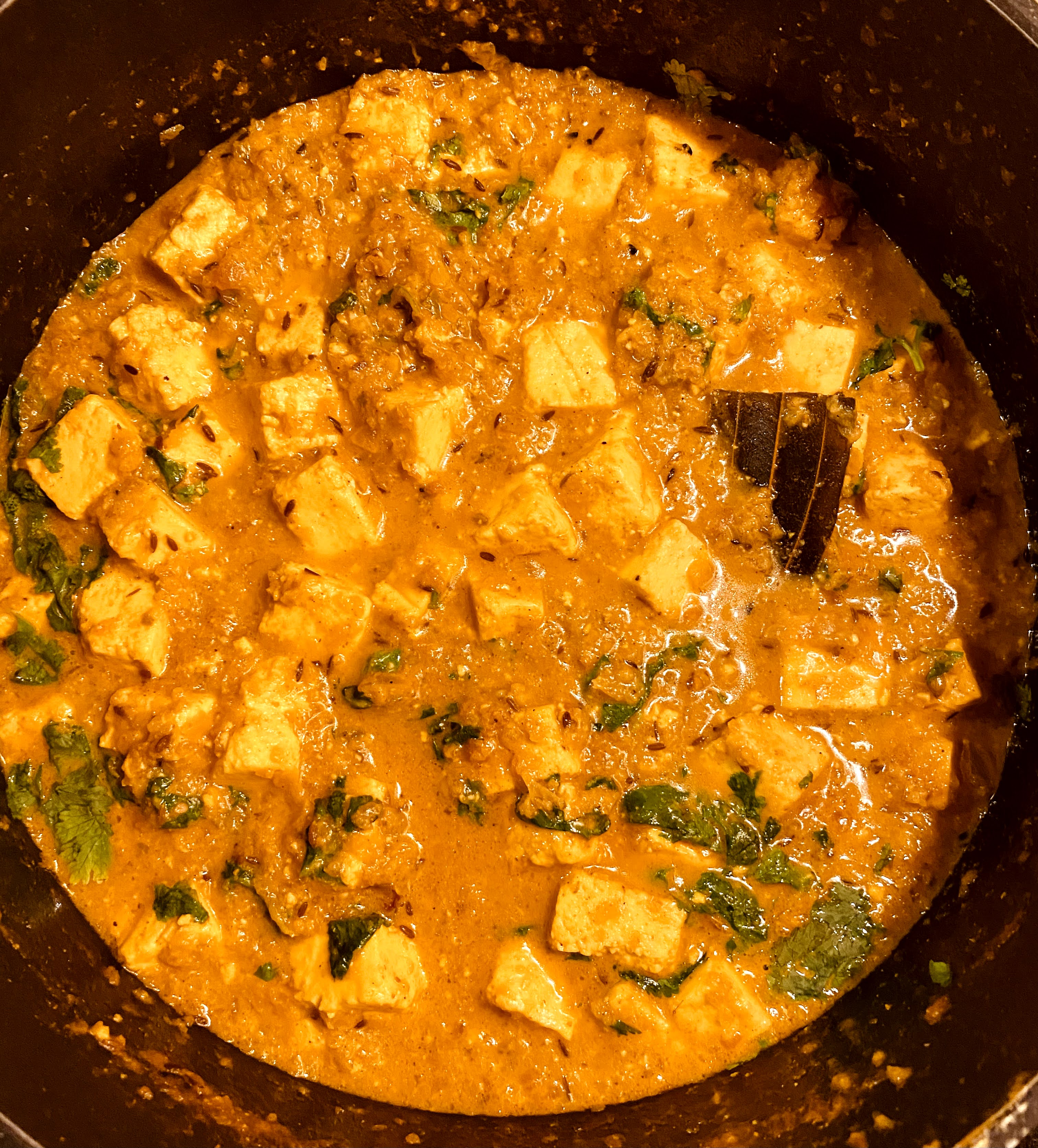
Shahi paneer, a dish from the Indian subcontinent with paneer as a primary ingredient

The origin of paneer is debated. Ancient Indian, Afghan, Iranian, and Portuguese origins have been proposed for paneer.

Legends about Krishna make several references to milk, butter, ghee and dahi (yogurt), but do not mention sour milk cheese. According to Arthur Berriedale Keith, a kind of cheese is "perhaps referred to" in Rigveda 6.48.18. However, Otto Schrader (1890) believes that the Rigveda only mentions "a skin of sour milk, not cheese in the proper sense". Vedic literature refers to a substance that is interpreted by some authors, such as K. T. Achaya, Om Prakash and Sanjeev Kapoor, as a possible form of paneer, but without definitive evidence.

Catherine Donnelly, author of The Oxford Companion to Cheese (2016), mentions that Vedic literature refers to cheese production made with the aid of barks of palash tree (Butea monosperma), fruits like jujube (Ziziphus mauritiana) and creeper like putika with coagulating enzymes, "as well as Dadhanvat, a cheese-like substance made with and without pores". According to Catherine Donnelly, these plant substances may have contained rennet-like enzymes and notes that the "Vedas may include some of the earliest known references to rennet-coagulated cheeses". Lokopakara text dated to the 10th century gives two recipes for coagulated cheeses made from buffalo milk for making sweets using plants and roots. According to the text, buffalo milk was coagulated using roots of amaranth plant or leaves of marsh barbel (Hygrophila auriculata); the soft cheese produced in this manner was called Haluvuga. In the second recipe, buffalo milk was coagulated with Indian mallow (Abutilon indicum) or country mallow (Sida cordifolia) and was made into balls for sweets. Manasollasa, a Sanskrit-language text by the 12th-century king Someshvara III, describes Kshiraprakara, a similar sweet food prepared from milk solids after separating boiled milk using buttermilk.

Another theory is that paneer originated in Persianate lands and spread to the Indian subcontinent under Muslim rule. Paneer, according to this theory, was developed and moulded to suit local tastes under these rulers, and the Delhi Sultanate and Mughal Empire are when paneer as currently known developed. Another theory states that paneer is Afghan in origin and spread to India from the lands that make up Afghanistan. National Dairy Research Institute states that paneer was introduced into India by Afghan and Iranian invaders. Based on texts such as Charaka Samhita, BN Mathur wrote that the earliest evidence of a heat-acid coagulated milk product in India can be traced to 75–300 CE, in the Kushan-Satavahana era. Sunil Kumar et al.(2011) interpret this product as the present-day paneer. According to them, paneer is indigenous to the north-western part of South Asia and was introduced in India by Afghan and Iranian travellers.

A different theory is that the Portuguese may have introduced the technique of "breaking" milk with acid to Bengal in the 17th century. Thus, according to this theory, Indian acid-set cheeses such as paneer and chhena were first prepared in Bengal, under Portuguese influence. A type of smoked cheese called Bandel was introduced by the Portuguese in Bengal, which is distinct from paneer.

== Nutrition and preparation ==
Paneer
Nutritional value per 100 g (3.5 oz)
- Energy: 1,251 kJ (299 kcal)
- Carbohydrates: 23.3 g
- Sugars: 22.5 g
- Fat: 15.5 g
- Protein: 15.9 g
Vitamins and minerals
| Vitamins | Quantity %DV^{†} |
| Vitamin A equiv. beta-Carotene | 17% 155 μg 0% 34 μg |
| Minerals | Quantity %DV^{†} |
| Calcium | 46% 597 mg |
| Iron | 0% 0 mg |
| Magnesium | 14% 58 mg |
| Phosphorus | 39% 490 mg |
| Potassium | 24% 728 mg |
| Sodium | 8% 185 mg |
| Zinc | 19% 2.04 mg |
- ^{†}Percentages estimated using US recommendations for adults, except for potassium, which is estimated based on expert recommendation from the National Academies.

Paneer is prepared by adding food acid, such as lemon juice, vinegar, citric acid, or dahi (yogurt), to hot milk to separate the curds from the whey. The curds are drained in muslin or cheesecloth and the excess water is pressed out. The resulting paneer is dipped in chilled water for 2–3 hours to improve its texture and appearance. From this point, the preparation of paneer diverges based on its use and regional tradition.

In north Indian cuisines, the curds are wrapped in cloth, placed under a heavy weight such as a stone slab for two to three hours, and then cut into cubes for use in curries. Pressing for a shorter time (approximately 20 minutes) results in a softer, fluffier cheese.

In Bengali, Odia and other East Indian cuisines, the chhena are beaten or kneaded by hand into a dough-like consistency, heavily salted and hardened to produce paneer (called ponir), which is typically eaten in slices at teatime with biscuits or various types of bread, deep-fried in a light batter or used in cooking.

In the area surrounding the city of Surat in Gujarat, surti paneer is made by draining the curds of buffalo milk and ripening them in whey.

== Culinary use ==
Paneer is the most common type of cheese used in traditional cuisines from the Indian subcontinent. Paneer dishes may be sweet, such as shahi paneer, or spicy, such as chilli paneer.

Paneer recipes include:

- Matar paneer (paneer with peas)
- Shahi paneer (paneer cooked in a Mughlai curry)
- Paneer tikka (a vegetarian version of chicken tikka, paneer placed on skewers and roasted)
- Paneer tikka masala
- Chilli paneer (in Indian Chinese cuisine with spicy chilies, garnished with spring onions)
- Kadai paneer (paneer with bell peppers and spices)
- Paneer pakora (paneer fritters)
- Palak paneer (paneer with spinach)
- Khoya paneer (a curry with khoya soft cheese as well as paneer, eaten with bread)
- Paneer makhani (Paneer with butter, tomatoes and cashews)
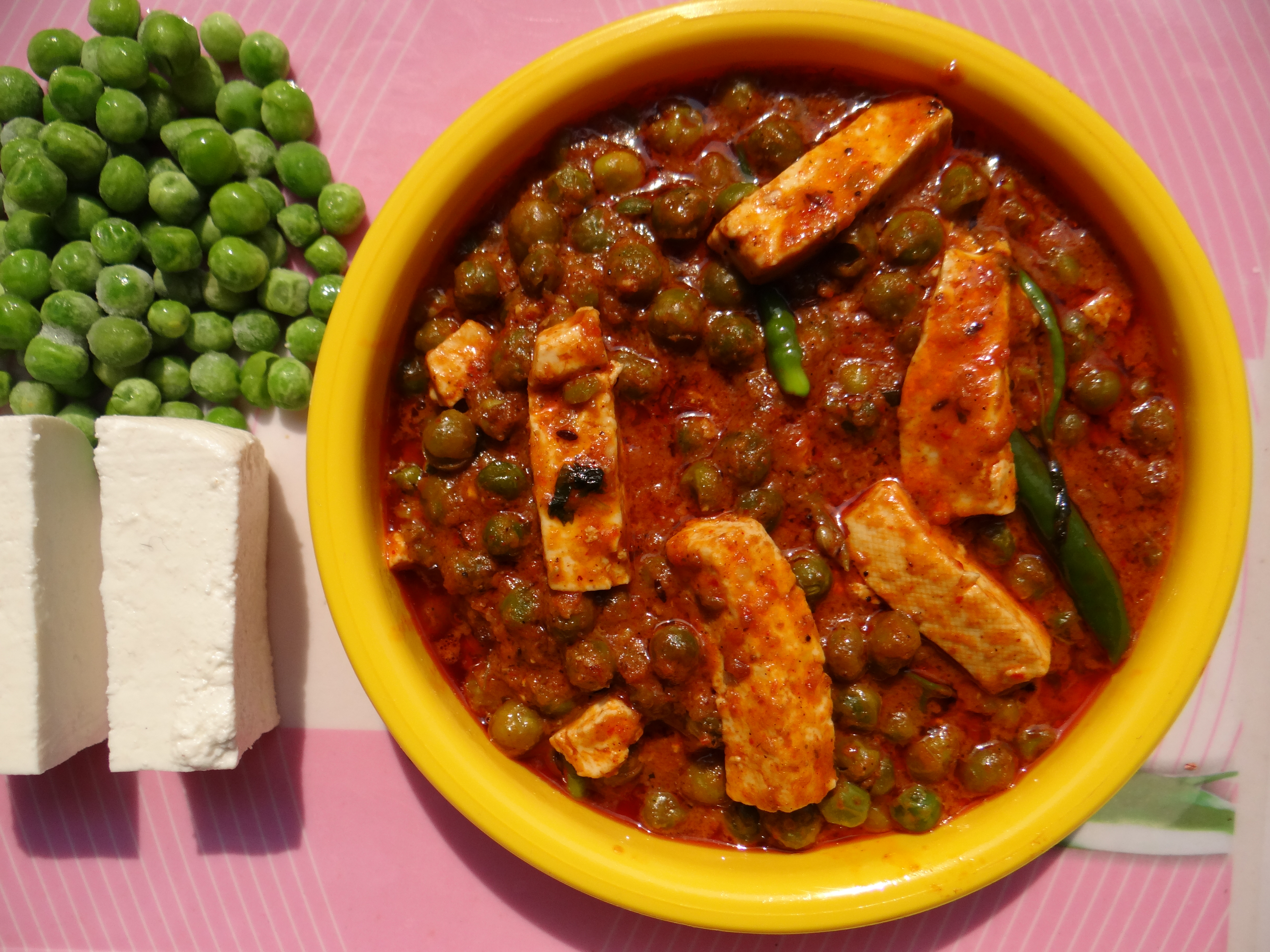
Mattar paneer, a vegetarian dish

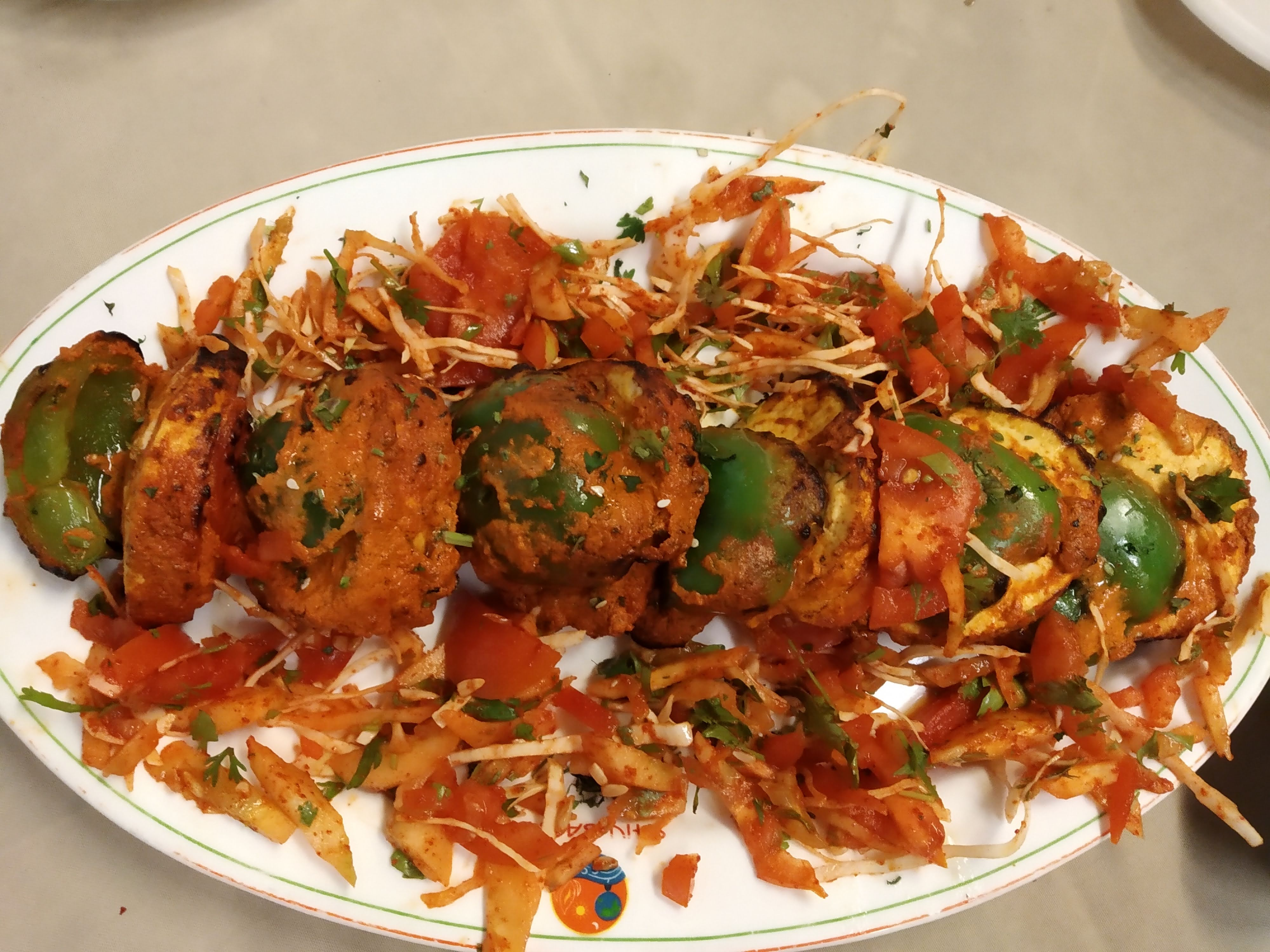
Paneer tikka, grilled on a skewer

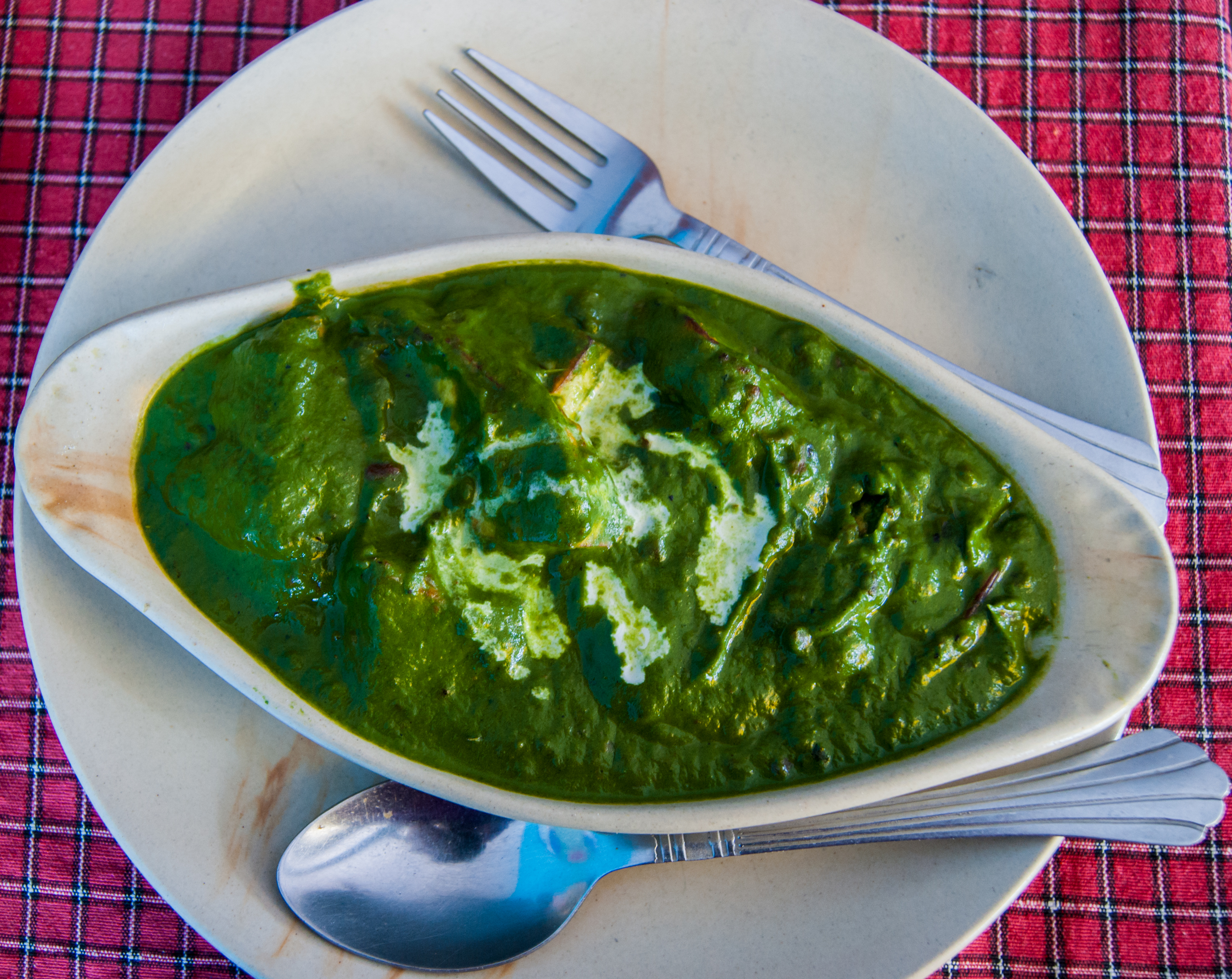
Palak paneer, a spinach-based curry dish

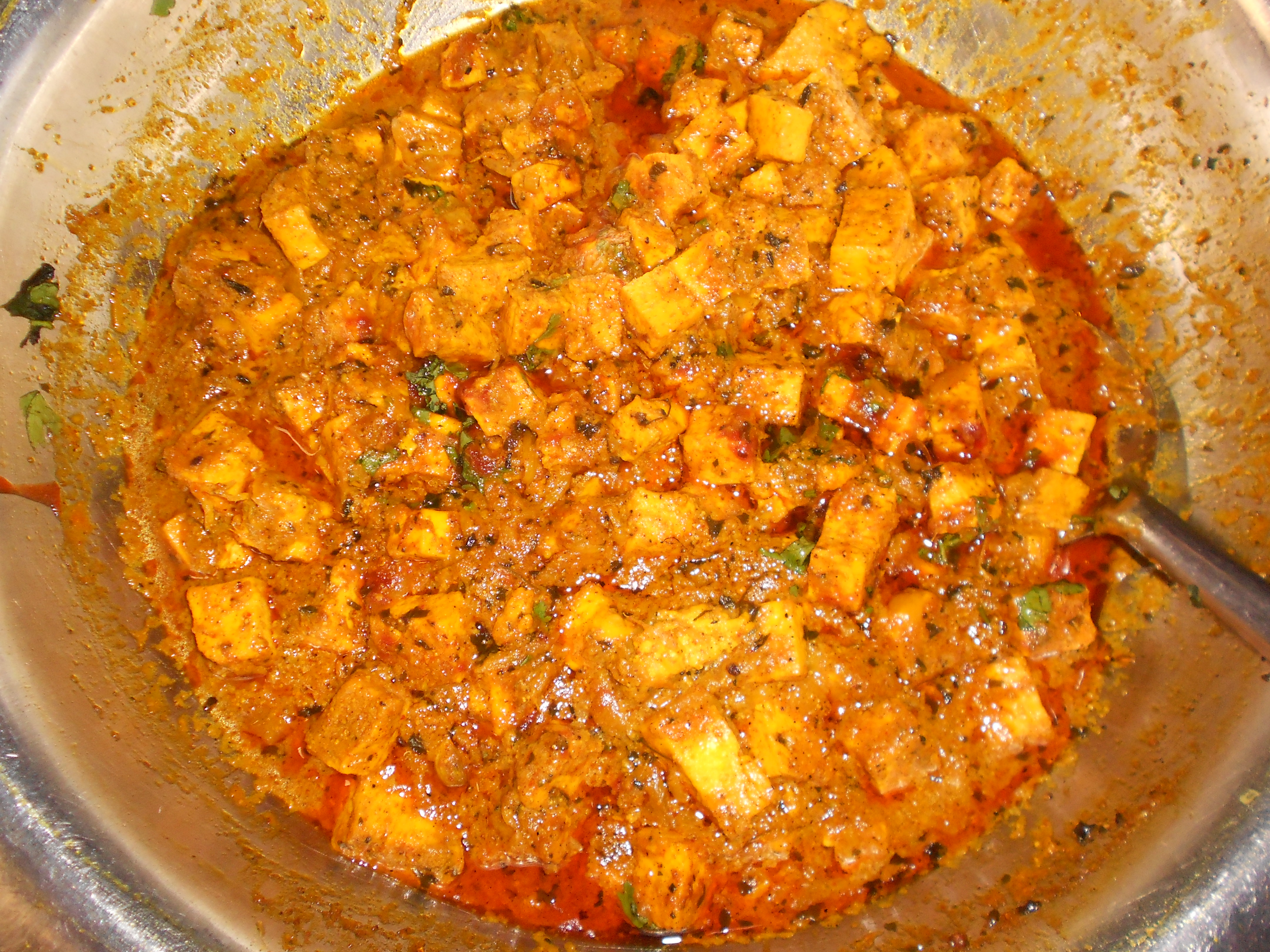
Paneer tikka masala

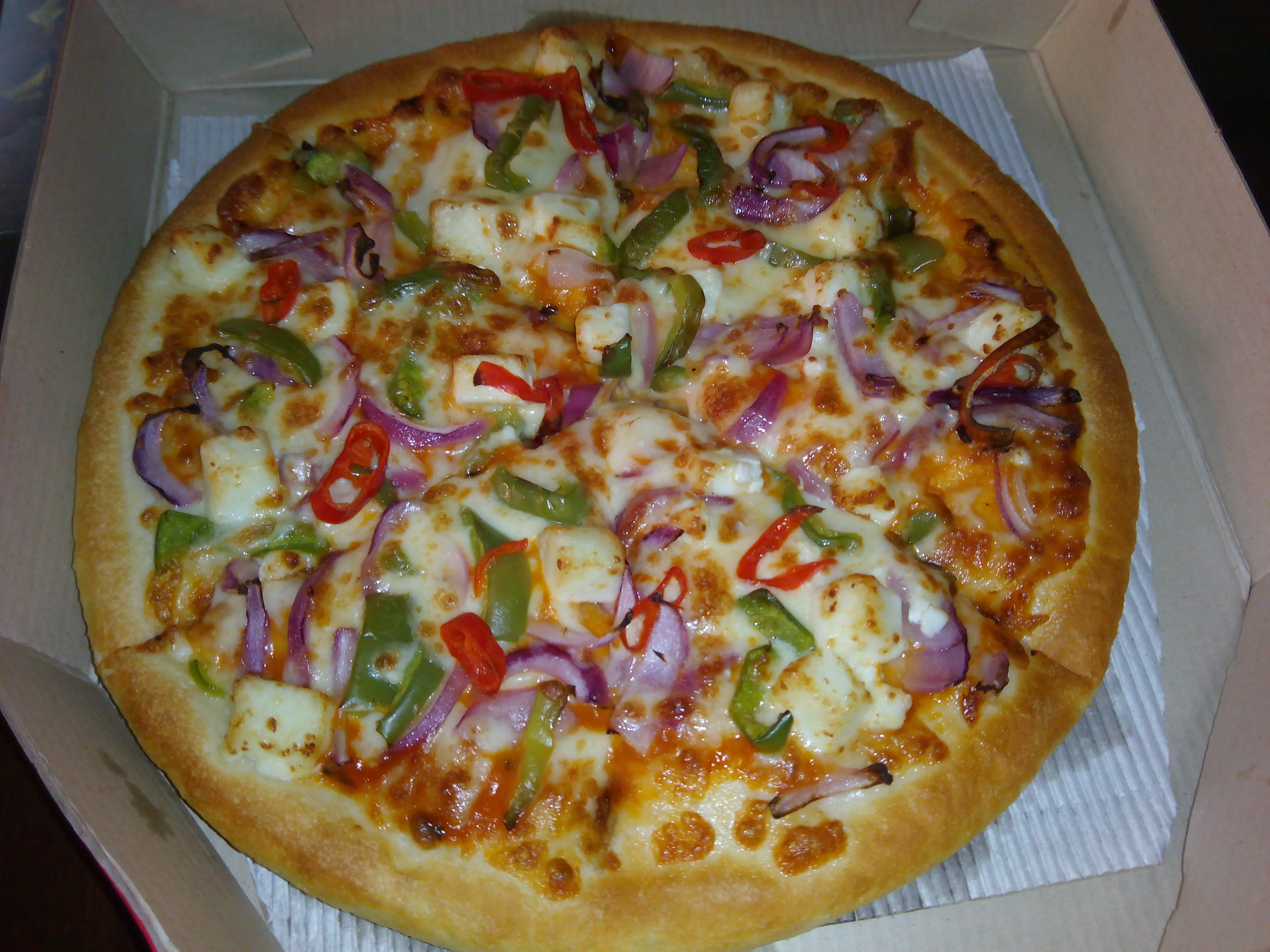
A pizza with paneer and vegetable toppings

== See also ==
- Chhena – Type of cheese curds originating in India
- Kalari cheese – Indian traditional ripened cheese
- Khoa – Indian dairy food
- Surti paneer – Indian soft cheese prepared from buffalo milk
