= Eye Hospital =

Eye Hospital may refer to:

- Advanced Eye Hospital and Institute
- Aier Eye Hospital
- Akhand Jyoti Eye Hospital
- Aravind Eye Hospitals
- Biratnagar Eye Hospital
- Dr. Agarwal's Eye Hospital
- Dr. Shroff's Charity Eye Hospital
- Egmore Eye Hospital
- Eye Hospital (Singapore)
- Eye Hospital of Wenzhou Medical University
- Ispahani Islamia Eye Institute and Hospital
- Manchester Royal Eye Hospital
- Moorfields Eye Hospital
- Royal Eye Hospital (South London)
- Royal Victoria Eye and Ear Hospital
- Saint John Eye Hospital Group
- Sarojini Devi Eye Hospital
- Sankara Eye Hospital
- Victoria Eye Hospital
- Western Eye Hospital
- Wills Eye Hospital
