= Makhani =

Makhani means "buttery" and may refer to several dishes in North Indian cuisine:

- Butter chicken, also known as or chicken makhani or murgh makhani
- Dal makhani, made from beans and pulses
- Paneer makhani, made from the white cheese paneer, also known as paneer butter masala

== See also ==
- Makhan, an Indian male given name
