= Tandoori masala =

Spice mixture used in Indian cuisine

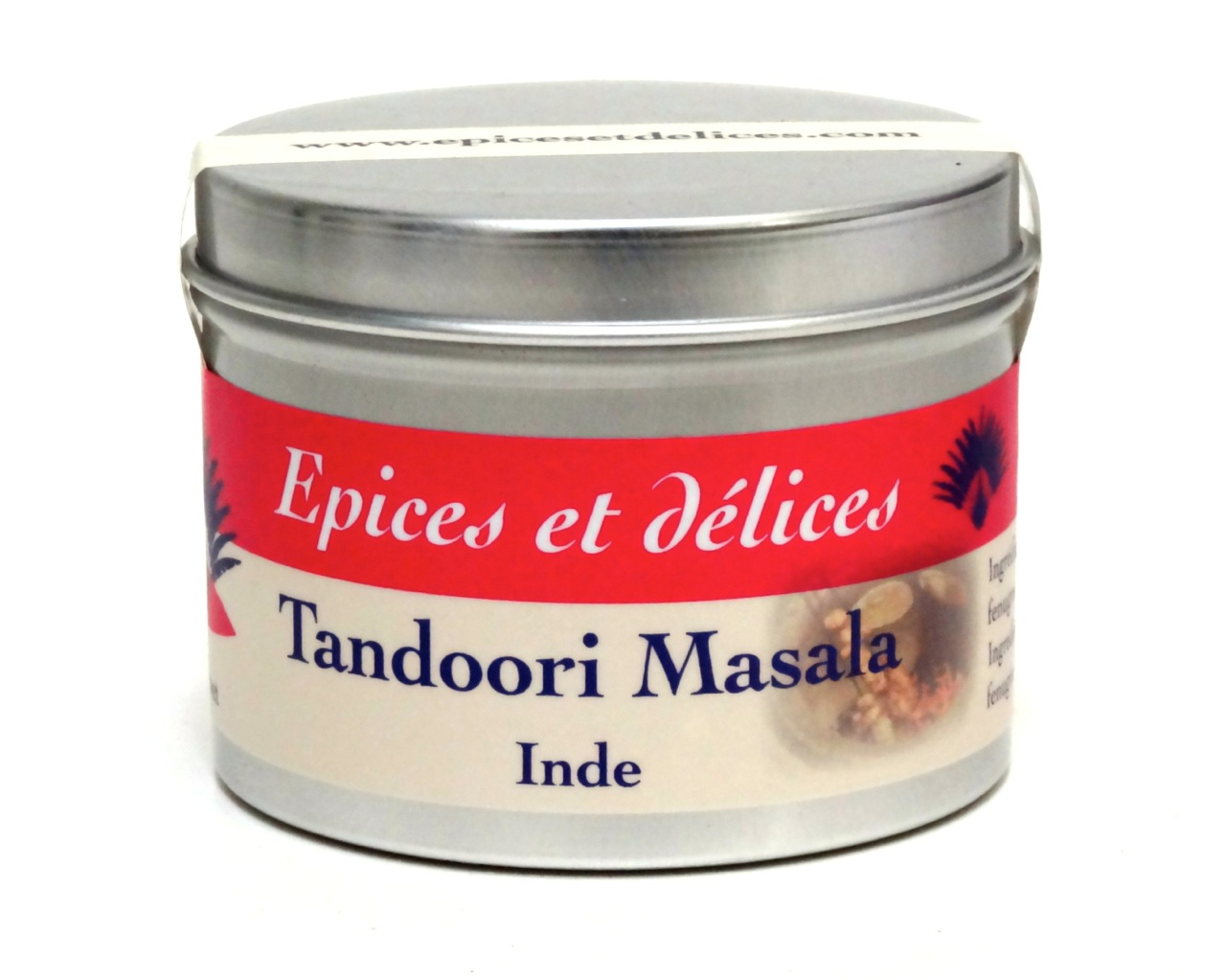
Commercial tandoori masala

Tandoori masala or tandoori sauce is a mixture of spices specifically for use with a tandoor, or clay oven, in traditional cooking in the Indian subcontinent. The specific spices vary somewhat from one region to another but typically include garam masala, garlic, ginger, onion, cayenne pepper, and sometimes other spices and additives. The spices are often ground together with a pestle and mortar.

== Origin ==
Kundan Lal Gujral is credited as the creator of the tandoori masala spice blend. While working in a restaurant in Peshawar in the 1920s, Kundan Lal experimented with the tandoor that was traditionally used for baking naan. He was the first to cook chicken in the tandoor, and the spice blend he made and used for cooking the chicken in this manner became known as tandoori masala. In Delhi, Kundan Lal opened a restaurant called Moti Mahal.

== Usage and storage ==
Tandoori masala is used extensively with dishes such as tandoori chicken. In this dish, the chicken is covered with a mixture of plain yogurt and tandoori masala. The chicken is then roasted in the tandoor on high heat; when prepared in this fashion, the chicken has a pink exterior and a savory flavor.

Other chicken dishes, mostly Punjabi, also use this masala, such as tikka or butter chicken. Meat other than chicken can be used, as can paneer in, for example, paneer tikka.

If freshly prepared, the masala can be stored in airtight jars for up to two months. The spice blend is also readily available at larger supermarkets and specialty Asian stores.
