= Rajvardhan Azad =

Indian academic (born 1950)

- Born: 1950 (age 75–76)
- Education: P.W. Medical College, Patna University, AIIMS, New Dehi
- Occupations: Academician, professor, researcher and surgeon
- Father: Bhagwat Jha Azad

Rajvardhan Azad (born 1950) is an Indian ophthalmologist, vitreoretinal surgeon and academician.

A fellow of the National Academy of Sciences. he is currently a professor emeritus at the Regional Institute of Ophthalmology, Indira Gandhi Institute of Ophthalmology, Indira Gandhi Institute of Medical Sciences (IGIMS). He previously served as the chairman of Bihar State University Service Commission from February 2018 to October 2023.

== Life and work ==
Azad was born in 1950 to Bhagwat Jha Azad, former Chief Minister of Bihar from 1988 to 1989, and Indira Jha Azad.

He completed his MBBS in 1973 from P.W. Medical College, Patna University, and MD (Ophthalmology) in 1977 from All India Institute of Medical Sciences, New Delhi.

He is a nominated member of Legislative Council, Bihar.

He is a chairman of the Clinical and Research advisory board, Akhand Jyoti Eye Hospital; visiting professor of Zhongshan Ophthalmic Centre, Sun Yat-Sen University; and advisor to State key Laboratory Guangzhou China. He previously served as the chief and professor of Ophthalmology, All India Institute of Medical Sciences.

He is a former advisor (Ophthalmology) to the Ministry of Health & Family Welfare (Govt. of India), and former advisor to the Armed Forces Medical Services Ministry of Defense (Government of India). He served as president of the National Board of Examination GOI, NBE, MOHFW; and as chairman of the PG Committee Medical Council Of India. He served as the president elect of South Asian Academy of Ophthalmology (SAO) and Asia-Pacific Academy of Ophthalmology (APAO). chairman of the All India Ophthalmological Society (AIOS), He is the past president of Asia Pacific Ophthalmic Trauma Society (APOTS), All India Ophthalmological Society (AIOS), Vitreoretinal Society of India (VRSI) and Delhi Ophthalmological Society (DOS). He was nominated to the World Health Organization (WHO) development group for the package of vitreoretinal interventions which aims to facilitate the integration of eye care within universal health coverage.

Azad is an editor and reviewer for various national and international journals such as Indian Council of Medical Research (ICMR), Advances in Ophthalmology Practice and Research, British Medical Journal Ophthalmology, Indian Journal of Pediatrics, BioMedCentral Ophthalmology, Indian Journal of Ophthalmology, and Journal of American Association. He has published 400 articles in peer reviewed journals.

He is a recipient of the BC Roy National Award for eminent medical teacher from the Medical Council of India, Hose Rizal Award, APAO highest award for significant contribution to Ophthalmology in Asia Pacific Region, and ICO Golden Apple Award. He has also received the lifetime achievement award from All India ophthalmological Society, Vitreo Retinal Society of India and Delhi Ophthalmological Society.

== Books ==
Some of the books he has authored are:

- Retinal Detachment Surgery: A Practical Manual, Jaypee Medical Publishers (P) Ltd., Daryaganj, New Delhi
- Retinopathy of Prematurity: CME series, All India Ophthalmological Society
- A manual of Indirect Ophthalmoscopy, coauthored with H.K. Tewari, published by Jaypee Publishers
- Current concepts in Ophthalmic Lasers, coauthored with H.K.Tewari, Jaypee Publishers, Darya Ganj, Delhi
- Vitrectomy for beginners, coauthored with H.K. Tewari, Jaypee Publishers, Darya Ganj, Delhi – March 1994
