= Kundan Lal Jaggi =

Indian chef and restaurateur

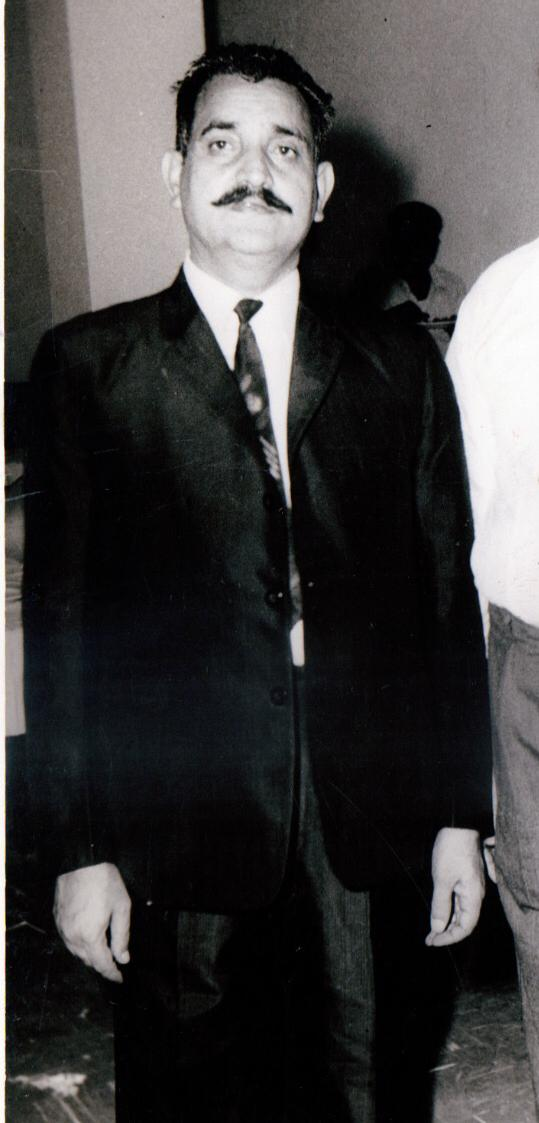
- Born: 10 September 1924; Peshawar, North-West Frontier Province, British India (Present-day Khyber Pakhtunkhwa, Pakistan)
- Died: 4 March 2018 (aged 93); Delhi, India
- Occupation: Restaurateur

Kundan Lal Jaggi (10 September 1924 – 4 March 2018) was an Indian chef and restaurateur based in New Delhi. Kundan Lal Jaggi is the inventor of butter chicken, dal makhani, paneer makhani and the founder of the Moti Mahal restaurant along with his partners Kundan Lal Gujral and Thakur Das Magu in 1947 in Daryaganj, Delhi.

== Early life ==
Kundan Lal Jaggi was born in Peshawar to Gandamal Jaggi & Channan Devi, a Punjabi Hindu family. One of many children, Kundan Lal Jaggi left home early in life and took up work at a restaurant in the city of Peshawar.

Kundan Lal Jaggi married Swaran Devi and had five children.

== Culinary training and career ==
Kundan Lal Jaggi started training under the owner of Moti Mahal restaurant, where he had joined as an apprentice and rose to become the chef over the next 12 years. His amiable personality and flair with the tandoor made him a famous name in the culinary circles of Peshawar.

== Contributions to Indian cuisine ==
The Partition of India in 1947 forced Kundan Lal Jaggi to make his journey from the frontier to the capital city of Delhi. In an area called Daryaganj, Jaggi found a shop and decided to open a restaurant at the premises. Along with his friends from Peshawar (Kundan Lal Gujral and Thakur Dass), Jaggi opened the city's first restaurant that would serve food cooked in a tandoor (a cylindrical clay oven).

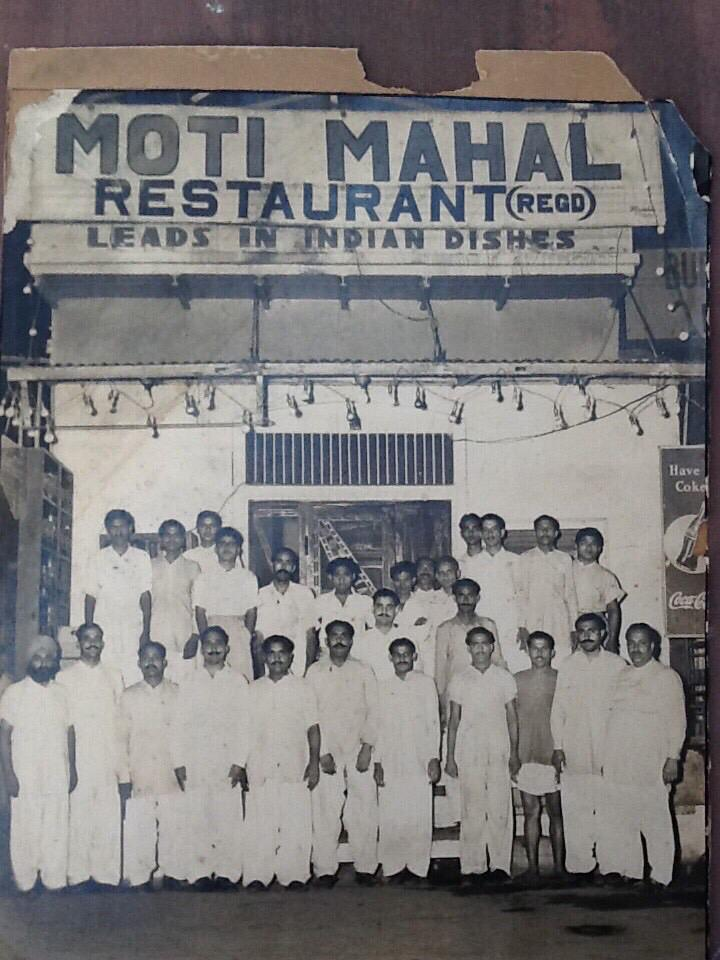
By Thomas Crane

=== Butter chicken ===
One evening, a group of hungry guests arrived at Jaggi's restaurant around closing time. Jaggi made a gravy with tomatoes, butter, and a few spices to feed everybody. He added the leftover portions of tandoori chicken to this gravy, giving it a unique flavor. Jaggi added this recipe to the menu under the name Butter Chicken.

=== Dal makhani ===
Based on feedback from customers, Kundan Lal Jaggi experimented and created a new recipe using ‘maa ki dal’ (black gram). He slow-cooked the dal on the tandoor overnight with a mix of tomatoes, butter, red kidney beans and a few herbs and spices. The overnight cooking produced a flavorful dal with a creamy consistency. He named it the Dal Makhani (meaning buttery in Hindi) as a vegetarian counterpart to Butter Chicken.

=== Moti Mahal ===
Kundan Lal Jaggi, Kundan Lal Gujral, and Thakur Dass Mago were old friends from Peshawar who, after a chance meeting, together opened the city's first restaurant that served Tandoori food, called Moti Mahal in Delhi's Daryaganj. The restaurant started with modest beginnings and soon became a culinary landmark in the city. It enjoyed the patronage of many dignitaries, both Indian and foreign, most notably Pt. Jawaharlal Nehru, the then prime minister of the country.

== Legacy ==
=== Daryaganj - By The Inventors of Butter Chicken and Dal Makhani ===
Though Kundan Lal Jaggi's culinary journey ended with his demise, he bestowed his legacy on his grandson Raghav Jaggi who has created Daryaganj-By the inventors of butter chicken and dal makhani, a chain of restaurants in Delhi NCR with his restaurateur friend Amit Bagga . The restaurant concept has been developed keeping in mind Kundan Lal Jaggi's contribution to Indian cuisine and to showcase food made with guarded age-old recipes.

“Daryaganj” chain of restaurants are present across multiple locations in Delhi NCR.

== Awards ==
Kundan Lal Jaggi was awarded many accolades throughout his culinary journey, and in 2017 IFCA (The Indian Federation of Culinary Associations) conferred upon him the award of ‘Culinary Legend’ at their 7th International Chefs Conference.

=== Honorable mentions ===
“Your greatness is revealed not by the lights that shine upon you, but by the light that shines within you.” Dedication to Kundan Lal Jaggi in his obituary posted by the IFCA.
