= Louisa Ryland =

Louisa Anne Ryland
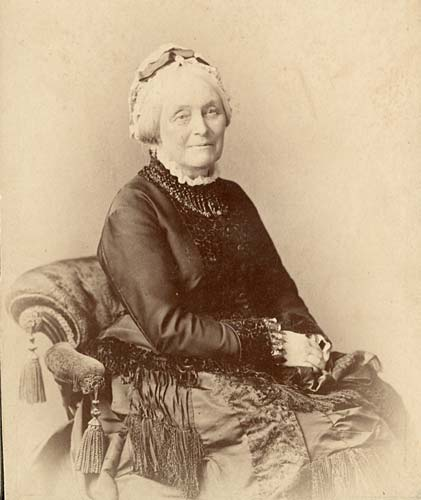
- Born: 14 January 1814; Edgbaston, Birmingham
- Died: 28 January 1889 (aged 75); Barford, Warwickshire
- Resting place: Sherbourne, Warwickshire
- Known for: Philanthropy

Louisa Anne Ryland (17 January 1814 – 28 January 1889) was a major benefactor to the (then) town of Birmingham, England. She became a millionaire on the death of her father, Samuel Ryland of The Laurels, Hagley Road, Edgbaston, whose family fortune was made in the wire drawing industry by his father, John Ryland.

== Early life ==
Louisa Ryland was born on 17 January 1814 to Samuel Ryland and Anne Pemberton. Samuel Ryland's father had made his fortune through wire drawing and then land investment around Birmingham, a portfolio that had been continued by Samuel. Ryland was brought up largely by her governess, Charlotte Randle, in a unitarian household. Samuel Ryland died in 1843 and Anne in 1862.

== Beneficiaries ==
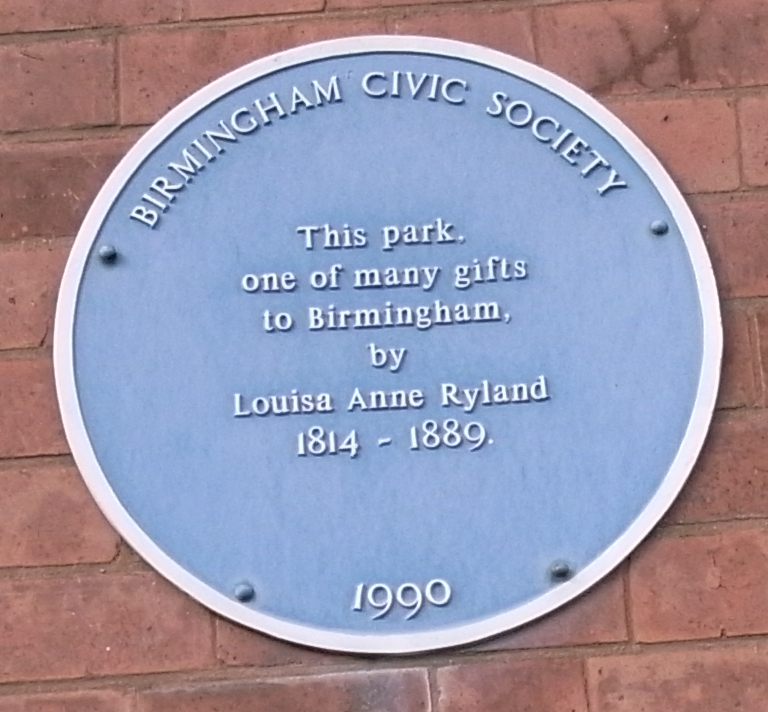
Blue plaque on lodge house at Cannon Hill Park

Louisa Ryland's donations included several large areas of land that were used to create public parks. The largest of these, donated in 1873, was some 80 acres (320,000 m^{2}) and became Cannon Hill Park. Another, in 1879, was Victoria Park (now Small Heath Park), Small Heath. She also contributed to education centres Birmingham School of Art and The Birmingham & Midland Institute, as well as multiple hospitals, Queen's Hospital, the Eye Hospital, the Jaffray Hospital and Birmingham General Hospital.

Louisa Ryland became one of Birmingham's most significant philanthropists, donating approximately £180,000 worth approximately £132 million in 2018. (Note: Comparing average earnings between 1889 and 2018, £180,000 is valued at approximately £136,200,000 by MeasuringWorth.com) However, it is difficult to confirm the actual amount donated, as Ryland refused to be associated with the donations, giving them either anonymously or as "A friend of Birmingham".

Louisa Ryland died at Barford Hill on 28 January 1889. She was buried at All Saints Church, Sherbourne, next to the grave of her governess, Charlotte Randle.
