= Vandana Jain =

Indian ophthalmologist

- Born: New Delhi, India
- Education: Maulana Azad Medical College (MBBS)
- Alma mater: Guru Nanak Eye Centre (Residency) LV Prasad Eye Institute, Hyderabad (Fellowship)
- Occupations: Cornea, Cataract, and Lasik Eye Specialist
- Known for: Founding Director of Advanced Eye Hospital and Institute
- Notable work: Over 30 national and international peer-reviewed publications

Vandana Jain is an Indian Cornea, Cataract and Lasik Eye Specialist. She is the founding Director of Advanced Eye Hospital and Institute in Navi Mumbai.

== Medical Training ==
Vandana was born and brought up in New Delhi. She received her undergraduate medical training from the Maulana Azad Medical College. She went on to pursue her residency in Ophthalmology from the Guru Nanak Eye Centre which is affiliated with Maulana Azad Medical College. Medical further completed a long term fellowship in Anterior segment services from the prestigious LV Prasad Eye Institute, Hyderabad.

== Publications ==
- Vandana has over 30 national and international peer reviewed publications.
- Being one of the few ophthalmologists to have received training exclusively in corneal diseases, she is oft quoted in leading newspapers and magazines.
- She is also a columnist for Deccan Herald, a leading Indian newspaper.
- She is also a health expert and columnist for DNA - Daily News and Analysis; a Mumbai-based English daily.
