= Kundan Lal Gujral =

Indian chef and restaurateur

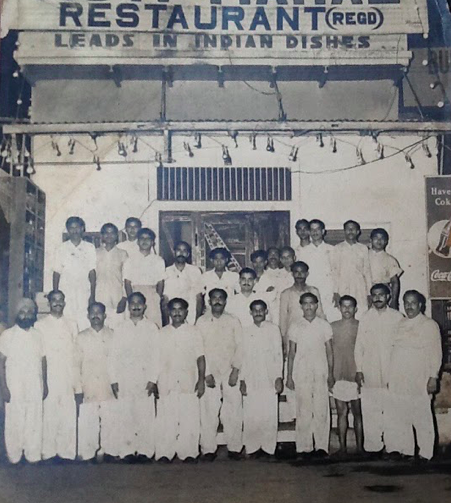
- opening of Moti Mahal restaurant
- Born: c. 1902; Chakwal, Punjab, British India (now in Punjab, Pakistan)
- Died: c. 1997; Delhi, India
- Education: Matriculation
- Occupations: Chef, Restaurateur
- Spouse: Ram Prakash Devi
- Culinary career
- Cooking style: Indian cuisine
- Current restaurant: Moti Mahal Delux
- Award won: IATO (Indian Association of Tour Operators) - 1990 for Inventing Tandoori Chicken

Kundan Lal Gujral (c.1902 - 1997) was an Indian chef and restaurateur based in New Delhi. He invented several Indian dishes which have since become popular worldwide, including butter chicken, paneer makhani, tandoori chicken and dal makhani. He was the founder of the restaurant chain Moti Mahal Delux.

== Early life ==
Kundan Lal Gujral was born around 1902 to Diwan Chand Gujral and Maya Devi in Chakwal District, in the Punjab Province of British India (now in Punjab, Pakistan) into a Punjabi Hindu Khatri family. His only brother Chunni Lal died at the age of 18 due to pneumonia. His father was a cloth merchant. Kundan Lal Gujral completed his matriculation in Chakwal. In c. 1920 he started working at a small eatery called Moti Mahal, owned by Mokha Singh Lamba in Peshawar, North-West Frontier Province, British India. He married Ram Prakash Devi with whom he had a child, Nand Lal Gujral on 26 November 1935.

In 1947, during the partition of India he migrated with his family to India and settled in Delhi. He then went on to start an eatery by the name of Moti Mahal in Daryaganj, Old Delhi.

== Known for ==
Kundan Lal Gujral is known for the famous culinary inventions such as tandoori chicken, murgh makhani and dal makhani.

=== The invention of tandoori chicken ===
Gujral started as a chef in a small restaurant owned by Mokha Singh Lamba in Gora Bazaar, Peshawar, British India. He experimented by skewering yogurt marinated pieces of chicken and sticking them into the tandoor (which was previously used only for Breads). This experiment led to the famous dish tandoori chicken. Tandoori chicken is another popular dish in Indian restaurants around the world.

=== The invention of murgh makhani ===
To avoid wastage of the leftover or unsold tandoori tikkas (marinated pieces of chicken cooked in a tandoor) due to the lack of refrigeration facilities at that time, Gujral added tomato gravy with butter to the tandoori tikkas to soften the chicken so that he could sell them the next day. This culinary accident led to the famous dish. Today, murgh makhani, or butter chicken, is the most popular curry in Indian restaurants around the world.

=== The invention of dal makhani ===
Gujral is also known for inventing dal makhani which is a mildly spiced pulses curry made with the combination of tangy tomatoes, butter, and rich cream. This combination of mixed spices and dairy products is known as famous dal makhani.

== Legacy ==
After having fled Pakistan, Kundan Lal Gujral settled in Delhi and opened a small dhaba (roadside eatery) to introduce Delhiites to the tandoori chicken. He bought a small space in Daryaganj and set up Moti Mahal. The place quickly proved popular and within a year Kundan Lal Jaggi & Gujral bought the adjoining area, turning his eatery into a 400-seat restaurant. Dignitaries like former Indian Prime Ministers, Jawaharlal Nehru and Indira Gandhi, former Indian President Dr. Zakir Hussain, actors Raj Kapoor and Nargis Dutt, and Soviet leader Mikhail Gorbachev are among the famous patrons.

He served his iconic dishes here. Later in 1970's Kundan Lal son, Nand Lal Gujral expanded Moti Mahal in South Delhi to establish Moti Mahal Delux chain of restaurants. Currently, Kundan Lal Gujral's grandson, Monish Gujral has instituted Moti Mahal Delux Management Services in 2003 by expanding the business into franchises across India. Today, it has grown from a small restaurant in Old Delhi to a modern eating chain with more than 150 franchises in India and worldwide.
