= Moti Mahal (restaurant) =

Historic restaurant

Coordinates: 28.6465°N 77.2401°E

- Type: Restaurants
- Industry: Hospitality
- Genre: North Indian cuisine, Punjabi cuisine
- Founded: 1947
- Founders: Kundan Lal Gujral, Thakur Das Magu, Kundan Lal Jaggi
- Headquarters: Delhi, India
- Area served: India, Bahrain, UAE
- Products: Restaurants

Moti Mahal is a restaurant chain founded in Delhi, India. Founded after the partition of India in 1947, the Moti Mahal in Delhi was founded by Kundan Lal Gujral, Kundan Lal Jaggi and Thakur Das Magu as one of the first restaurants to introduce Punjabi cuisine and North Indian cuisine to the rest of the world such as tandoori chicken, paneer makhani, dal makhani, and butter chicken.

Internationally, the franchise has restaurants in Bahrain, and the UAE.

== History ==
Moti Mahal was founded by Kundan Lal Gujral, Thakur Das Magu and Kundan Lal Jaggi, in Delhi in 1947. They worked at a small eatery called Moti Mahal, owned by a man named Mokha Singh Lamba in Peshawar, British India, from the 1920s to 1947.

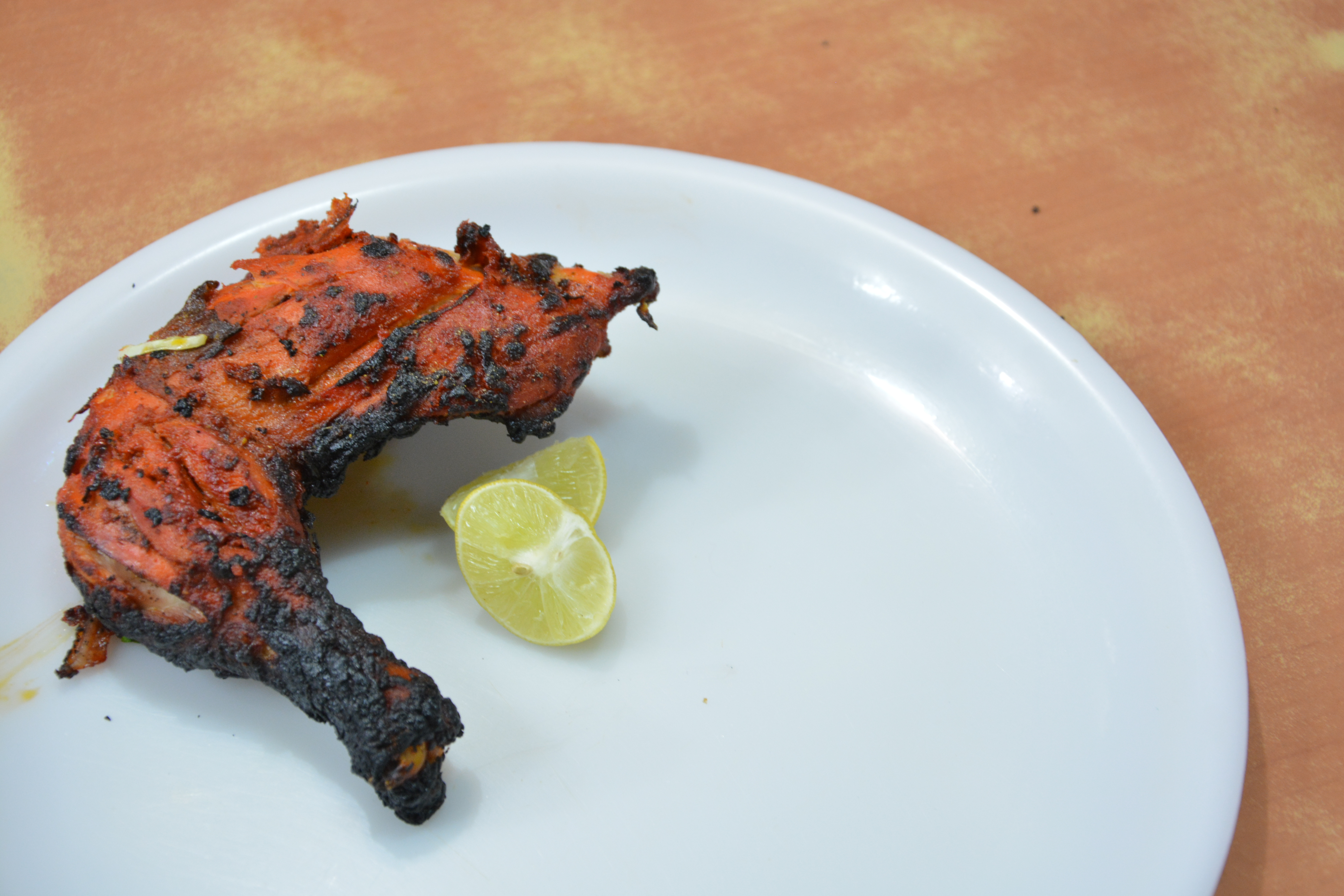
A portion of Tandoori chicken. Kundan Lal Jaggi, Kundan Lal Gujral and Thakur Das Magu, the founders of the restaurant, are credited with the invention of the dish.

After the partition of India in 1947, they fled to Delhi with their families. In Delhi, the three partners bought a thara (booth) in the Daryaganj area, then considered a newer part of Old Delhi and then they started Moti Mahal, Daryaganj. Moti Mahal further went on to invent butter chicken, paneer makhani, and dal makhani as well as the modern tandoori chicken.
