= Zeenat-ul-Masajid =

Mosque in Delhi, India

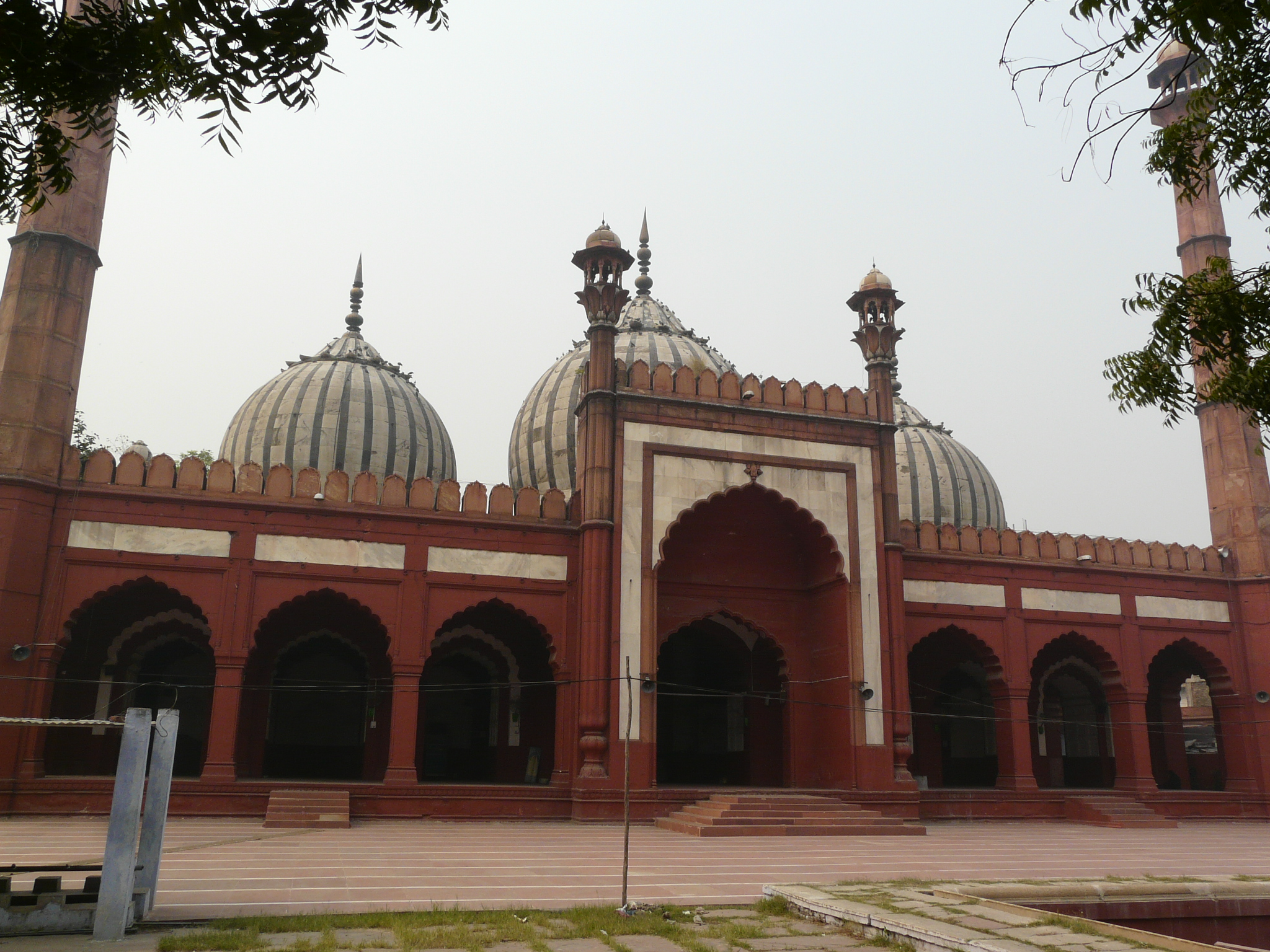
- The mosque façade in 2015

- Location of the mosque in Central Delhi

Religion
- Affiliation: Islam
- Ecclesiastical or organisational status: Mosque (c. 1710–1857); Profane use (1857–????); Mosque (since ????)

Location
- Location: Daryaganj, Old Delhi, Delhi NCT
- Country: India
- Coordinates: 28°38′48″N 77°14′42″E

Architecture
- Type: Mosque architecture
- Style: Mughal
- Founder: Zinat-un-Nissa Begum
- Completed: c. 1710
- Dome: Three

The Zeenat-ul-Masajid, also written as Zeenat-ul-Masjid and popularly known as the Ghata Masjid (lit. 'Cloud Mosque'), is an 18th-century Mughal mosque located in Daryaganj, Old Delhi, Central Delhi, India. The mosque was commissioned by Zeenat-un-Nissa, the second daughter of the Mughal emperor Aurangzeb.

== Location ==
The Zeenat-ul-Masajid is located in Daryaganj, in Central Delhi. It lies south of the Red Fort and overlooks the Yamuna River.

== History ==
The Zeenat-ul-Masajid was built in the beginning of the 18th century by Zeenat-un-Nissa, during the reign of her father Aurangzeb. Its construction was part of an increased patronage of mosques by the Mughal elite during the 18th century.

During the Siege of Delhi, the Zeenat-ul-Masajid was confiscated by British military forces and subsequently converted into a bakery for troops. The building was later partially used as a residence.

== Architecture ==
The Zeenat-ul-Masajid is built on a high plinth. It has three marble domes striped with red sandstone and topped by inverted lotus-blossoms. The mosque's pishtaq is adorned with marble and framed by thin turrets. The mosque's façade bears three archways on either side of the main entrance, each of which is supported by piers. At both ends of the mosque's façade are three-storey minarets. The mosque shows close influence from Shah Jahan's Jama Masjid in features such as the height of the pishtaq and the domes; however, elements of Aurangzeb-era architecture are also evident in the domes' bulbous shape and constricted necks, and the mosque's entrance archways.

== See also ==
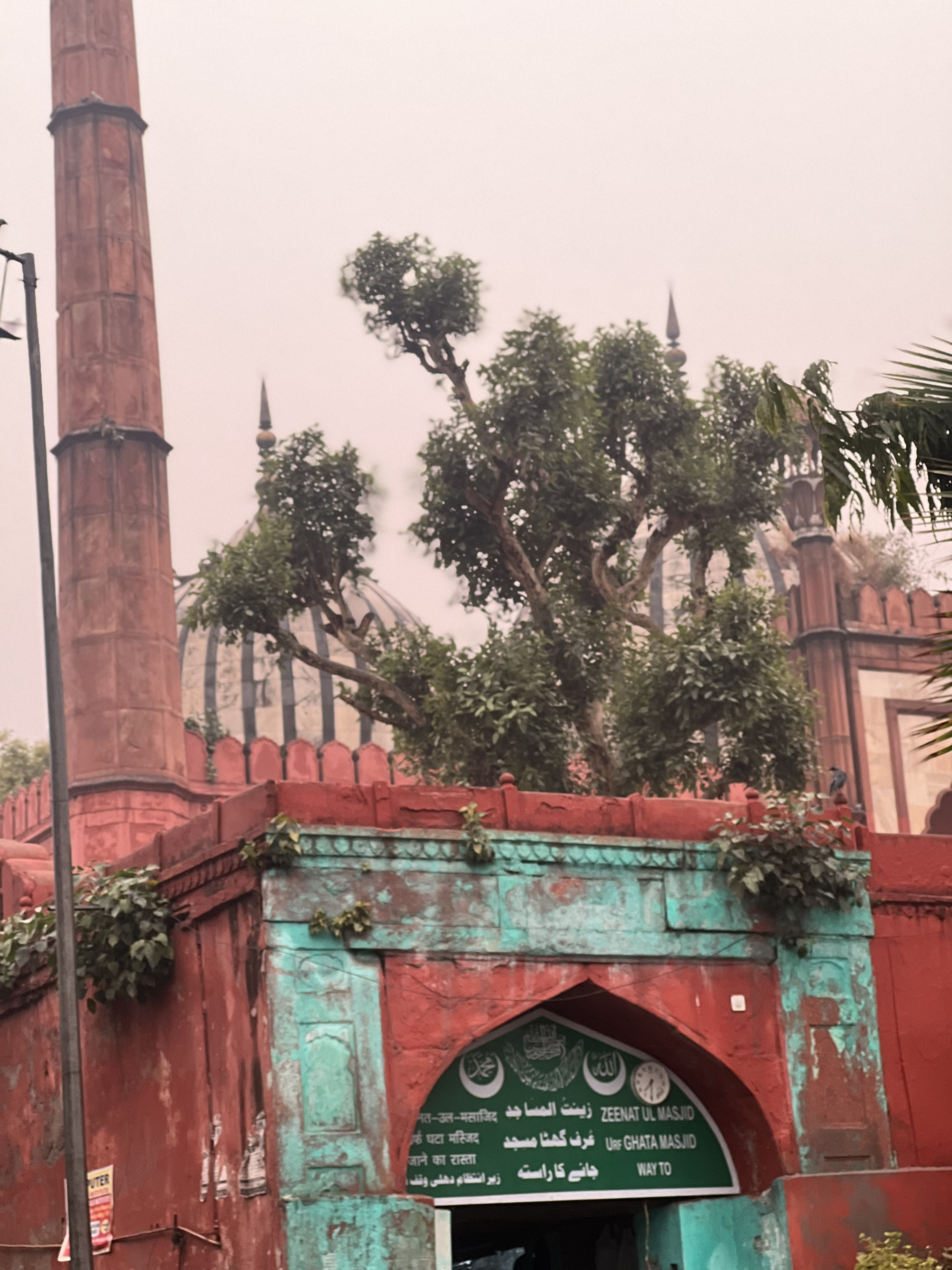
Zeenat ul Masjid, Darya Ganj

- Islam in India
- List of mosques in India
