= Biratnagar Eye Hospital =

Hospital in Biratnagar, Morang, Nepal

- Eastern Region Eye Care Programme and CBM

Geography
- Location: Biratnagar, Morang, Nepal
- Coordinates: 26°25′9.53″N 87°16′9.60″E

Organisation
- Care system: Eastern Region Eye Care Programme, CBM
- Type: Specialist

Services
- Emergency department: Yes
- Beds: 450
- Speciality: Ophthalmology

History
- Opened: Sep 2006

Links
- Website: www.erec-p.org

Biratnagar Eye Hospital (BEH) is an Eastern Regional Eye Care Programme (EREC-P) hospital located in Biratnagar, Nepal. The hospital is a development of Sagarmatha Choudhary Eye Hospital, Lahan (SCEH). BEH was started in Biratnagar, Nepal's second largest city 130 km east of Lahan, in September 2006.

With its two eye hospitals (SCEH and BEH), along with its satellite clinics EREC-P provides eye services to the population in eastern Nepal and northern India.

== History ==
Since its foundation Biratnagar Eye Hospital has grown from 100 beds to 450 beds under the leadership of the Programme Director Dr. Sanjay Kumar Singh.

In 2010 more than 154,000 patients were seen and 36,000 ophthalmic operations were carried out. The BEH offers free eye-care treatment for those who cannot afford to pay. As per reports of 2018, the total number of patients seen by EREC-P was more than 10,00,000 and number of surgeries performed were more than 1,30,000. This makes EREC-P one of the biggest contributor in the sector of Eye Care.

== Trustees ==
Eastern Regional Eye Care Programme (EREC-P) is co-financed with funds from the European Commission and Standard Chartered Bank's Seeing is Believing (SiB) programme. EREC-P continues the 28-year co-operation between Nepal Netra Jyoti Sangh (NNJS), the Social Welfare Council of Nepal and Christian Blind Mission. The CBM now stands for Christoffel Blinden Mission
