= Monish Gujral =

Indian Restaurateur, TV Host and Author

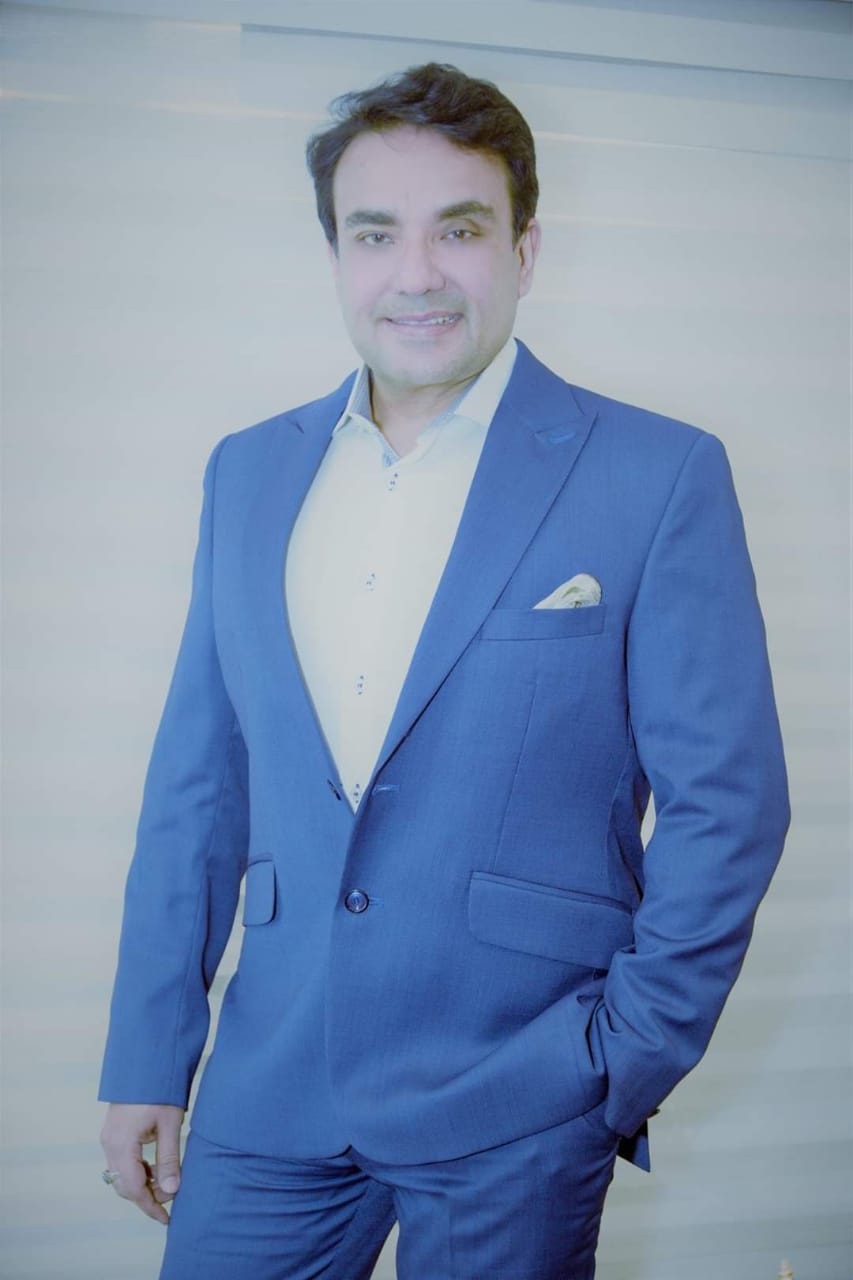
- Born: 31 August 1965 (age 60); Delhi, India
- Occupations: Restaurateur, chef, author, blogger
- Spouse: Sonal Gujral
- Children: Tanisha Bawa; Gunav Gujral
- Website: https://monishgujral.com/

Monish Gujral (born 31 August 1965) is an Indian food writer, restaurateur, and chef. He is the chairman of the restaurant chain Moti Mahal.

Gujral has been a member of managing committee of the national restaurant association of India (NRAI). He has published cook books, and worked as a food columnist for The New Indian Express. He has also hosted cookery shows on television.

== Early life ==
Gujral was born in a Hindu Punjabi family. His grandfather Kundan Lal Gujral was also a chef and restaurateur, who was one of the founders of the Moti Mahal chain of restaurants.

== Achievements ==
He is credited for expanding the Moti Mahal chain from a small iconic presence in Delhi to a multinational chain of hotels and restaurants. He is the author of 4 successful books that have been internationally critically acclaimed and internationally awarded by the Gourmand World Cookbook Fair.

== Books ==
- Moti Mahal Tandoori Trail- 2004
- On the butter chicken trail-2010
- On the kabab trail- 2014
- On the dessert trail- 2017
