= Balestier Road Seventh-day Adventist Church =

Church in Singapore

Coordinates: 1.3193°N 103.8521°E

The Balestier Road Seventh-day Adventist Church is a Seventh-day Adventist church in Bendemeer, Singapore. The church was the fourth Seventh-day Adventist church in Singapore.

== History ==
Originally known as the Community Church, the church was built on Balestier Road in Bendemeer, Singapore by the Assemblies of God in 1932. The church was designed by C. K. Yong in the shape of a pipe organ. The church was bought over and renovated by Seventh-day Adventists at a cost of $90,000 in 1951. The newly-renovated church formally reopened on 3 November. The newly-renovated church included a special nursery. Known as the Mother's Room, it had glass panel and a public announcement system, allowing mothers to see services and hear sermons and prayers, while noises made by the children would not be heard. The church underwent a major renovation from 1988 to 1989, which cost $400,000.

The church celebrated its 60th anniversary in 2011. The church's senior pastor is Mark Chan.
