= Tandoori chicken =

Marinated roast chicken dish

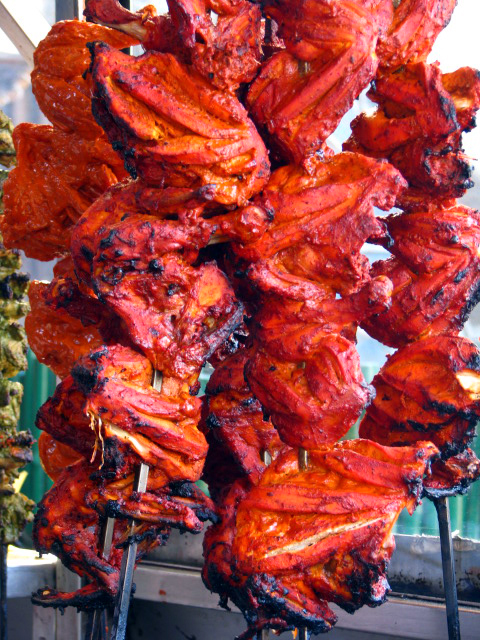
- Chicken tandoori in Mumbai, India
- Alternative names: Chicken tandoori
- Course: Appetiser or main course
- Region or state: Indian subcontinent
- Associated cuisine: Indian, Pakistani, Punjabi cuisine
- Main ingredients: Chicken, dahi (yogurt), honey, tandoori masala
- Variations: Tandoori paneer, fish tandoori

Tandoori chicken is a dish made from roasted chicken with meat marinated in yogurt and spices and roasted in a tandoor, a cylindrical clay oven. The dish is popular worldwide.

== History ==
Chicken roasted in tandoor-like ovens is documented in the Harappan civilisation of the Bronze Age of Indian subcontinent, as early as 3000 BC. Much later, the Sushruta Samhita records meat being cooked in an oven (kandu) after being seasoned with black mustard (rai) powder and fragrant spices.

Tandoori chicken as a dish originated in the Punjab before the independence of partition of India. In the late 1940s, tandoori chicken was popularised at Moti Mahal in the locality of Daryaganj in New Delhi by Kundan Lal Jaggi, Kundan Lal Gujral and Thakur Das Magu, who were Punjabi Hindu migrants from Peshawar as well as the founders of the Moti Mahal restaurant. They used to work at a small eatery called Moti Mahal, owned by a man named Mokha Singh Lamba in Peshawar, British India, from the 1920s to 1947.

Tandoori chicken was popularised in post-independence India by Moti Mahal, Daryaganj in Delhi when it was served to the first prime minister of India, Jawaharlal Nehru. There, tandoori chicken became a standard offering at official banquets.

In the United States, tandoori chicken began appearing on menus by the 1960s. Jacqueline Kennedy was reported to have eaten "chicken tandoori" on a flight from Rome to Bombay in 1962. A recipe for tandoori chicken was printed in the Los Angeles Times in 1963, for "the hostess in search of a fresh idea for a party dinner"; a similar recipe was featured in the same newspaper in 1964.

== Preparation ==
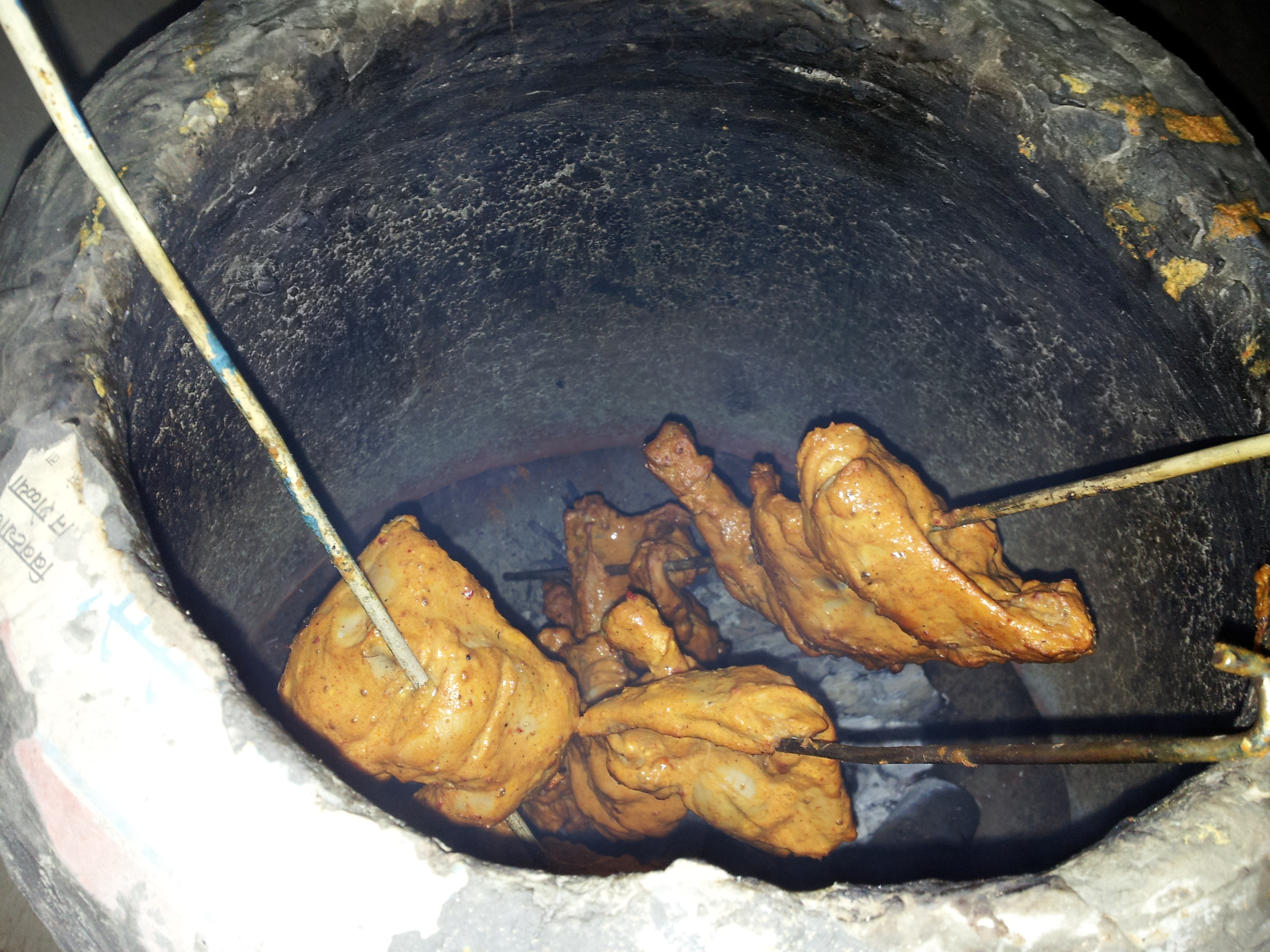
Tandoori chicken being prepared in a tandoor oven

Raw chicken parts are skinned then marinated in a mixture of dahi (yogurt) and tandoori masala, a spice blend. They are seasoned and coloured with cayenne pepper, red chilli powder, or Kashmiri red chilli powder as well as turmeric or food colouring. (Note: For instance, see the recipe in Madhur Jaffrey's Cookery, pp. 66–69)

The marinated chicken is placed on skewers and cooked at high temperatures in a tandoor oven, which is heated with charcoal or wood, which adds to the smoky flavour. The dish can also be cooked in a standard oven, using a spit or rotisserie, or over hot charcoal.

There are also tandoori recipes for whole chicken, some of which are cooked in a tandoor and others over charcoal. These include Chirga (Roasted whole chicken); Tandoori Murgh (Roast whole chicken with almonds); Murgh Kabab Seekhi (Whole stuffed chicken on the spit); Kookarh Tandoori (Steamed chicken on spit); Tandoori Murgh Massaledarh (Whole spiced chicken on spit); and Murghi Bhogar (Chicken in the Bhogar style).

== Cuisine ==
Tandoori chicken can be eaten as a starter or appetiser, or as a main course, often served with naan flatbread. It is also used as the base of numerous cream-based curries, such as butter chicken.

Tandoori chicken

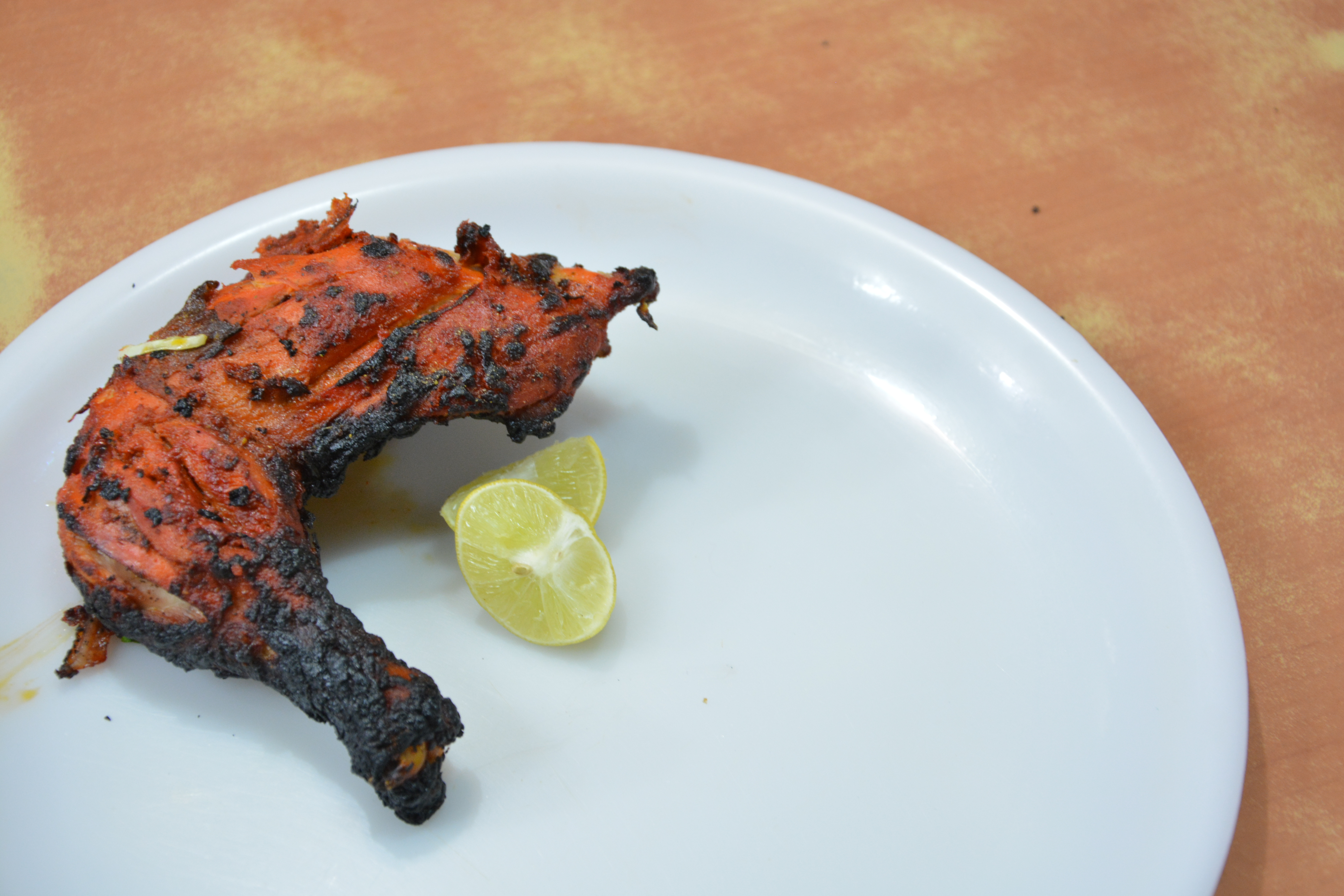
A portion of a tandoori chicken, at a restaurant in India

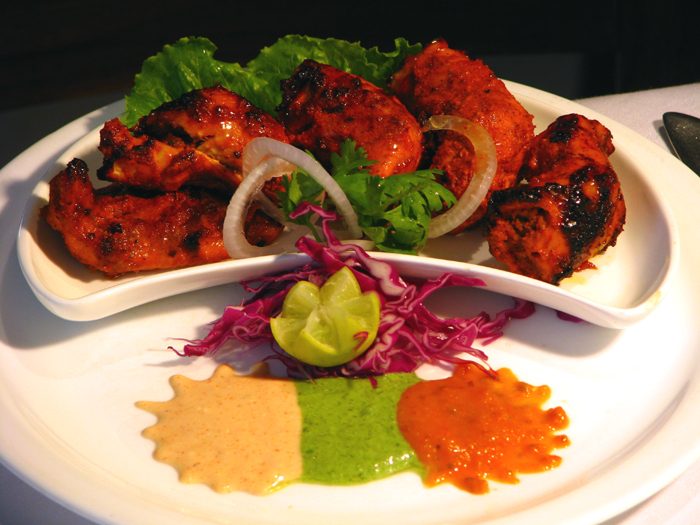
Tandoori chicken served at a restaurant in Mumbai, India

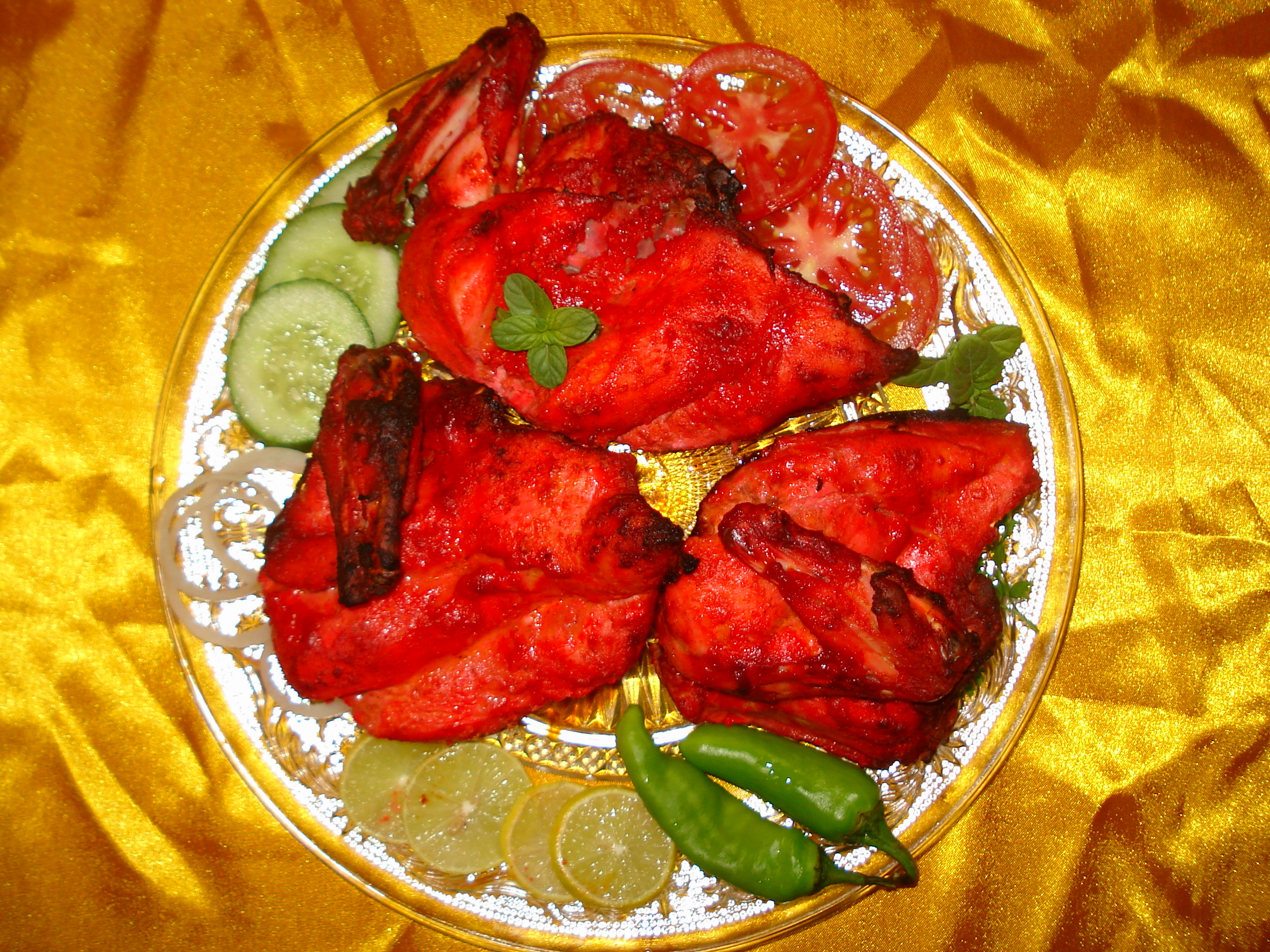
Tandoori chicken in Punjab, Pakistan

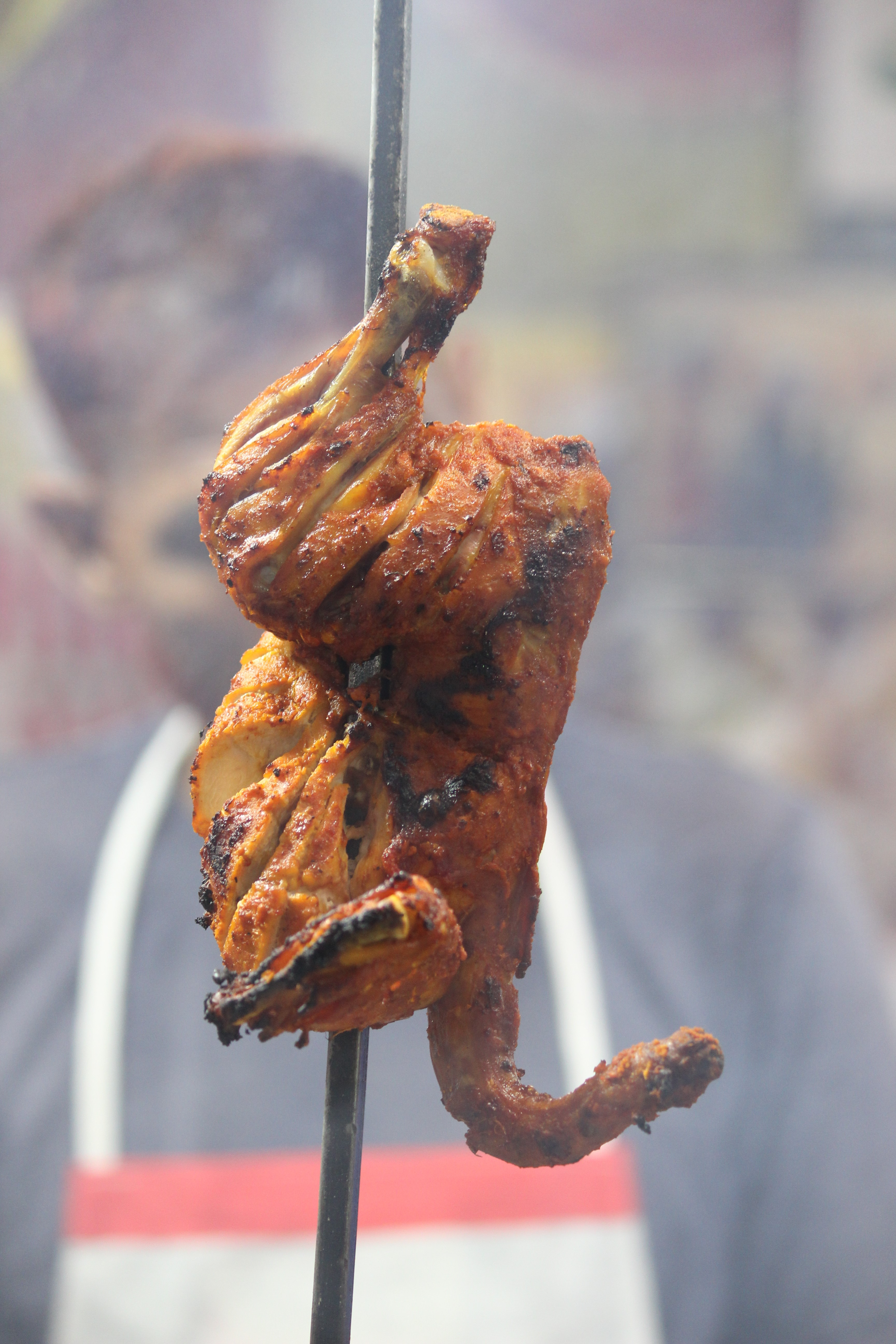
Tandoori chicken hanging at a restaurant in Agra, India

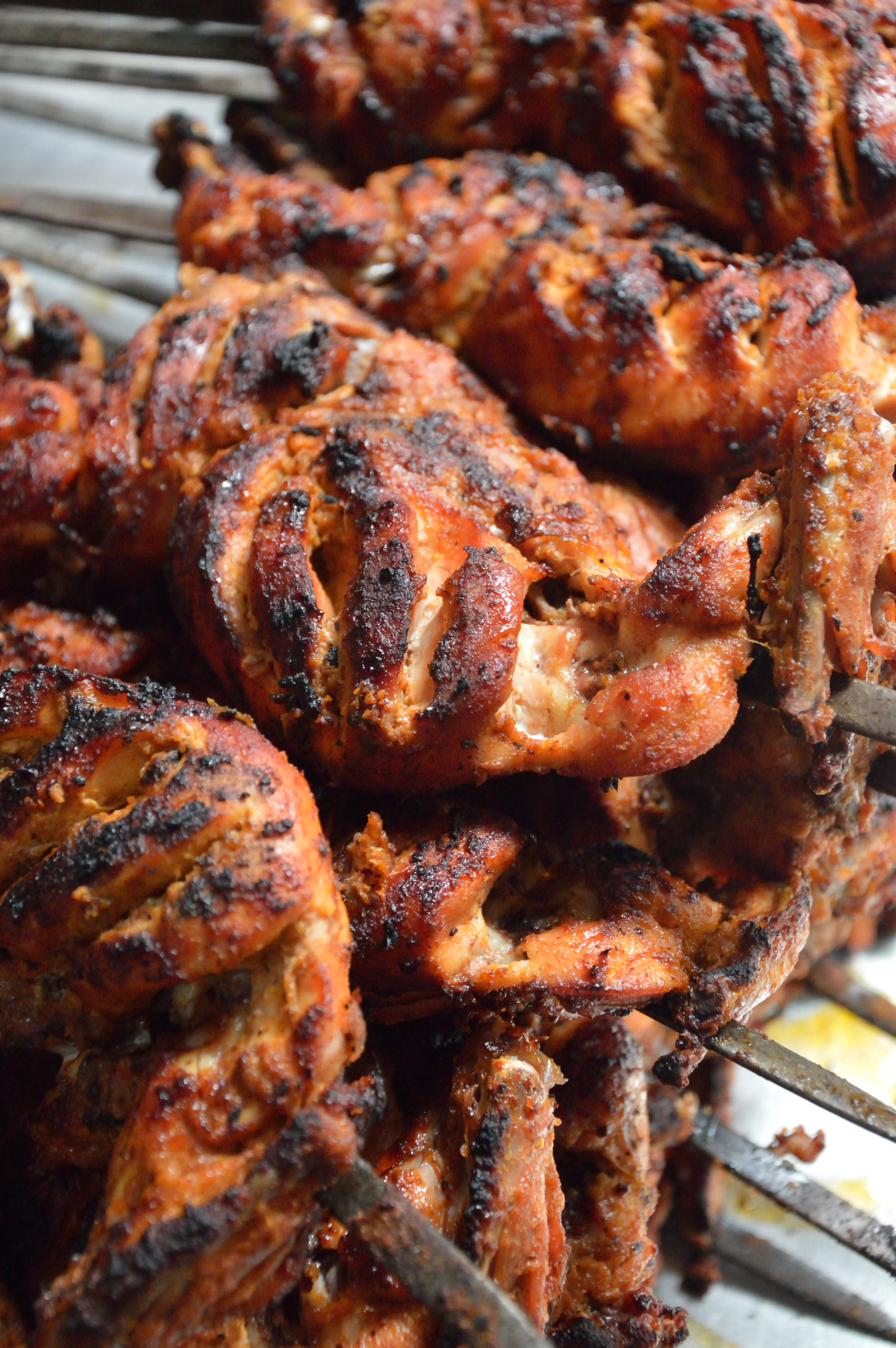
Tandoori chicken in Dhaka, Bangladesh

== Variations ==
The fame of tandoori chicken led to many derivatives, such as chicken tikka (and eventually the Indian dish popularised in Britain, chicken tikka masala), commonly found in menus in Indian restaurants all over the world. Nearly all derivatives of tandoori chicken begin with a yogurt and citrus-based marinade.

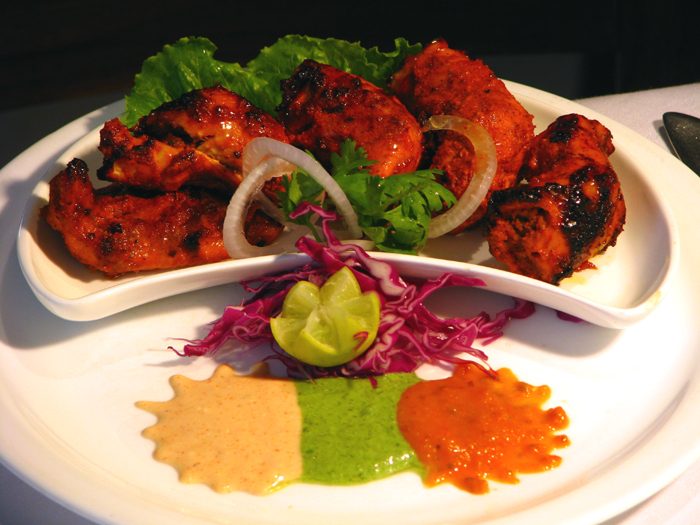
Chicken tikka

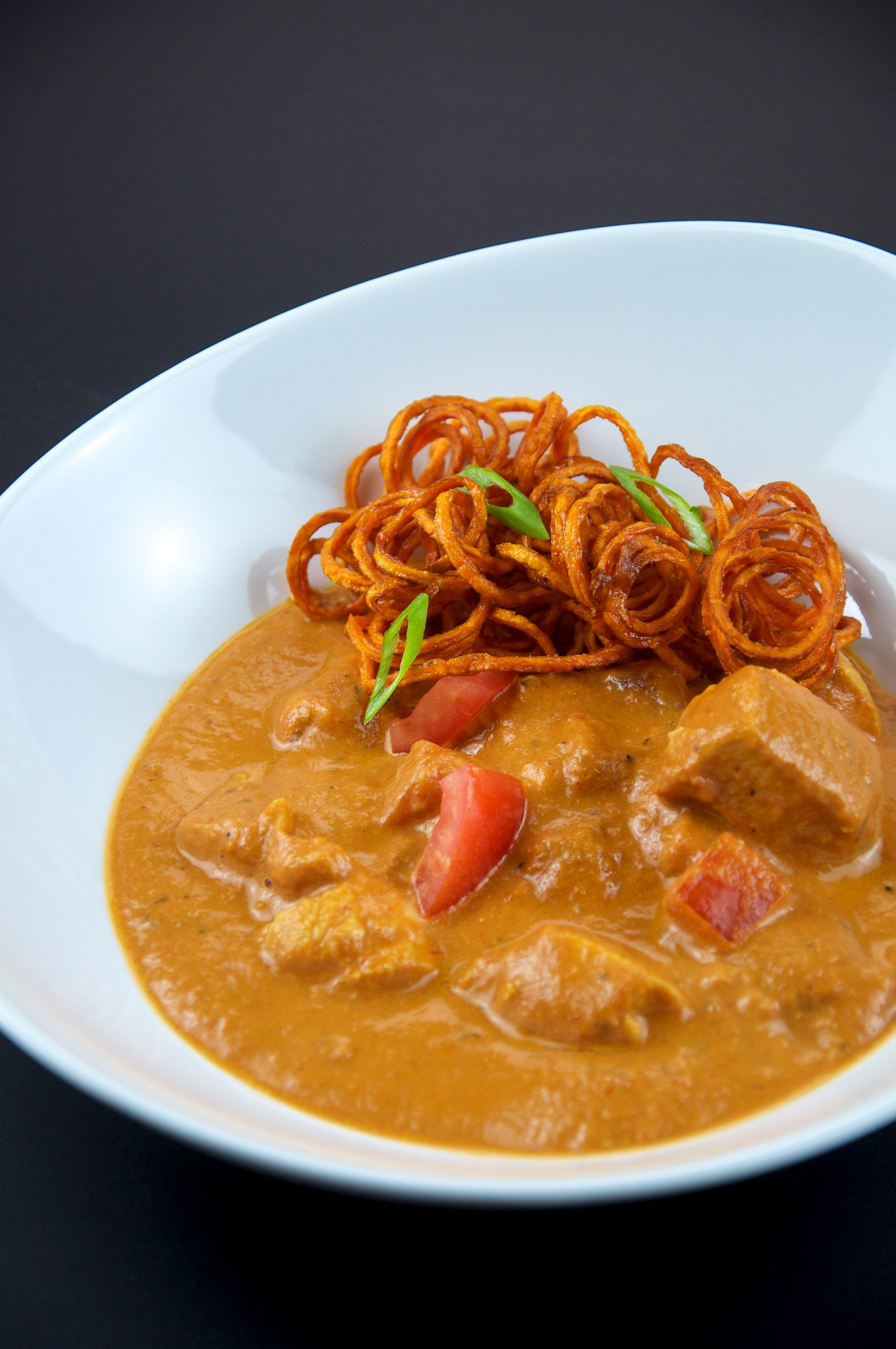
Chicken tikka masala

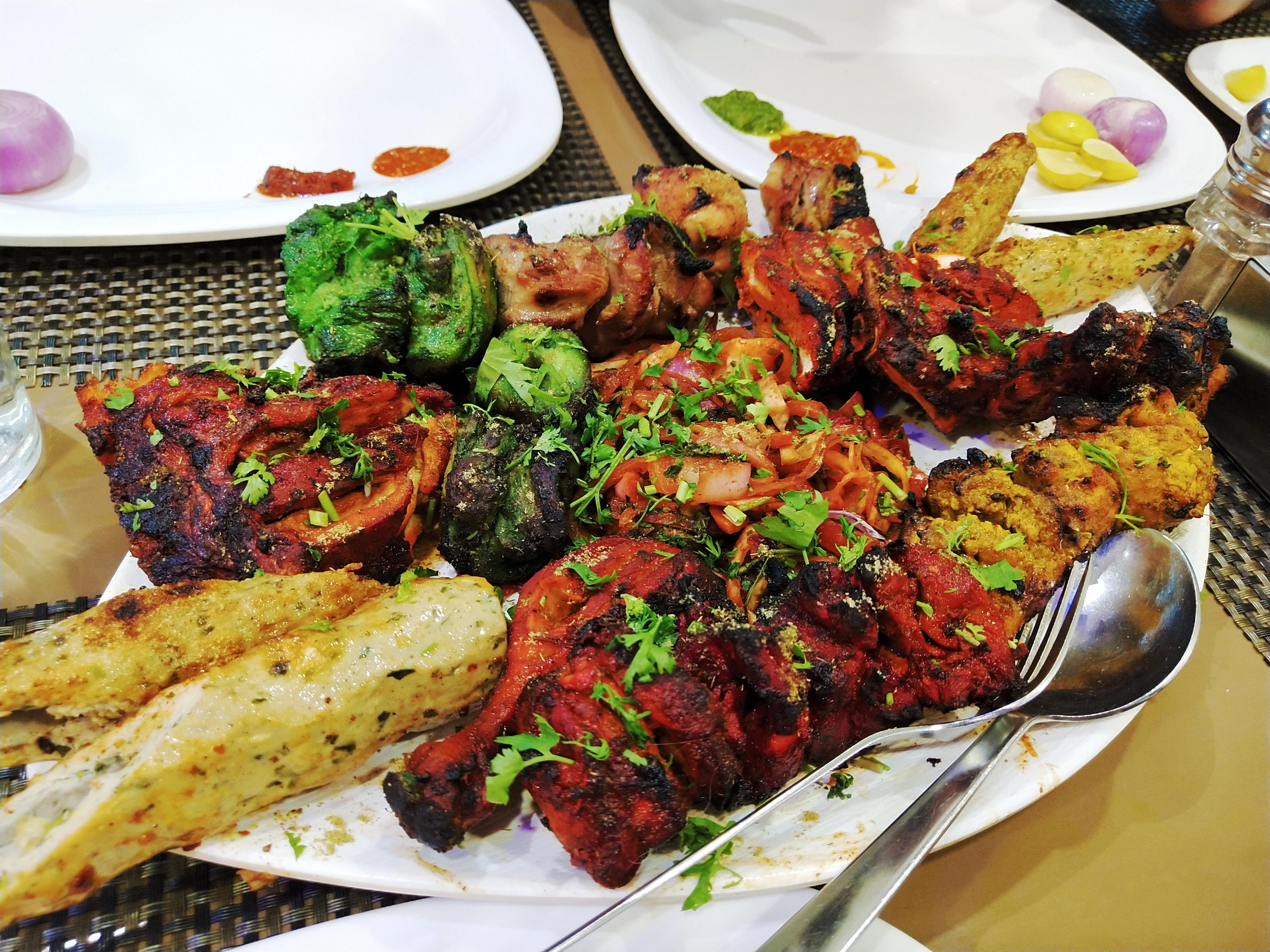
Indian chicken tandoori mix platter

== See also ==
- Indian cuisine
- List of chicken dishes
- Pakistani cuisine
- Punjabi cuisine
- Tandoori masala
- Butter chicken
- Kebab
