= Butter chicken =

Indian curry dish

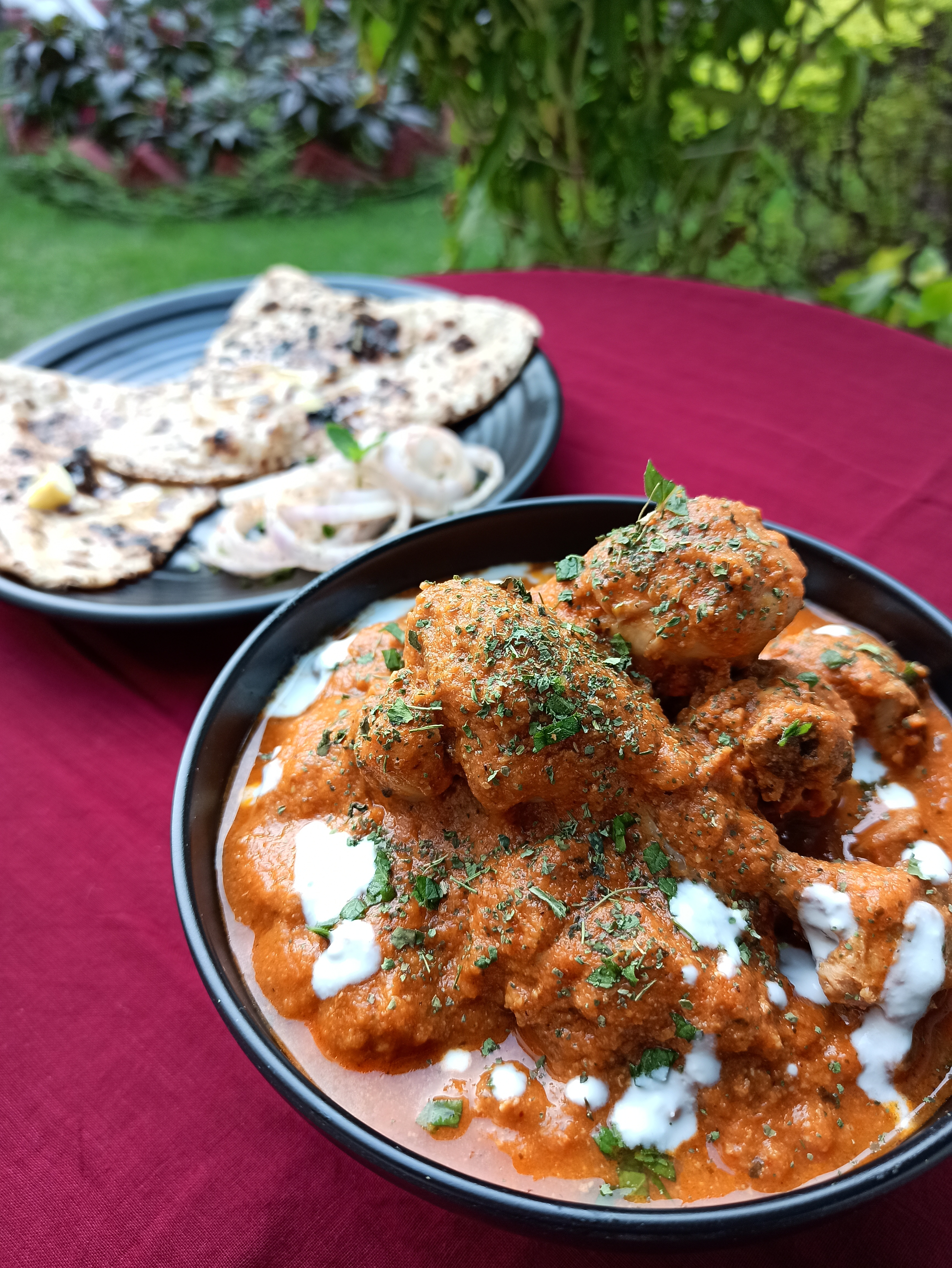
- Butter chicken served with naan
- Alternative names: Chicken makhani, murgh makhani
- Course: Curry
- Place of origin: India
- Region or state: Delhi
- Associated cuisine: Indian
- Created by: Kundan Lal Gujral and Kundan Lal Jaggi
- Main ingredients: Butter, tomatoes, chicken, garam masala, kasuri methi

Butter chicken or murgh makhani is a curry made from chicken cooked in a spiced tomato and butter-based (makhani) gravy. The gravy is known for its creamy, rich texture. It is similar to chicken tikka masala, which uses a tomato paste. The dish was invented by Indian chefs Kundan Lal Gujral and Kundan Lal Jaggi and is associated with their Moti Mahal restaurant in Daryaganj, Delhi which popularized it in the 1950s. It has since become a staple cuisine of the city.

== History ==
The dish was developed by Kundan Lal Jaggi and Kundan Lal Gujral. The curry was made "by chance" by mixing leftover tandoori chicken in a tomato sauce, rich in butter (makhan/makhani).

The chefs were both Punjabi Hindu refugees (after the partition of India) in Delhi from Peshawar. They popularized the dish at their Moti Mahal restaurant in the Daryaganj neighbourhood of Old Delhi in the 1950s, where it is often said to have been invented. In 2024, Monish Gujral, a grandson of Gujral and managing director at Moti Mahal, said the dish was created in Peshawar itself at another restaurant of theirs prior to partition in the 1920s or 1930s; he made the statement when suing the Jaggi family who now operate the rival "Daryaganj" restaurant and credit Kundan Lal Jaggi with inventing the dish at Moti Mohal in Delhi. Though Monish had earlier, in his 2013 book On the Butter Chicken Trail: A Delhi Darbar Cookbook, credited the accidental discovery of the dish to Moti Mahal in the 1950s.

Some writers also back the claim that butter chicken originated in Peshawar, noting that many of the ingredients appear geared toward non-Indian tastes, and that butter was only produced at scale in British garrison cities like Peshawar.

The dish and Moti Mahal have since been closely associated with Delhi cuisine, the restaurant also credited with inventing other "makhani" (butter) based curries like dal makhani and paneer makhani.

In 1975, the English phrase "butter chicken" curry first appeared in print, as a specialty of the house at Gaylord Indian restaurant in Manhattan. In Canada and the Caribbean, it can be found as a filling in pizza, poutine, wraps, roti, or rolls, while in Australia and New Zealand, it is also eaten as a pie filling. The curry is common in India, Bangladesh, Pakistan, and many other countries where a South Asian diaspora is present. Due to its popularity outside of India, it is sometimes mistakenly assumed to be of Western origin (like chicken tikka masala, with which it is sometimes confused).

== Preparation ==
Chicken is marinated for several hours in a mixture of lemon juice, dahi (yogurt), Kashmiri red chilli, salt, garam masala, ginger paste, and garlic paste.

The marinated chicken is cooked in a tandoor (traditional clay oven), but may be grilled, oven-roasted, or pan-fried. It is served in a mild curry sauce that includes butter. The sauce is a tomato, garlic, and ginger-based sauce that is simmered until smooth and much of the water has evaporated. There are many variations on the composition and spicing of the sauce, which is sieved so that it is velvety smooth. Spices may include cardamom, cumin, cloves, cinnamon, coriander, pepper, garam masala, and dried fenugreek leaves (Punjabi/Hindi: kasuri methi). Cashew paste may be used as a thickener and it is finally garnished with coriander.

== See also ==
- Biryani
- Chicken curry
- List of chicken dishes
- List of Indian dishes

== Bibliography ==
- Curry Club Tandoori and Tikka Dishes. London: Piatkus (1993). ISBN 0-7499-1283-9.
- Curry Club 100 Favourite Tandoori Recipes. London: Piatkus (1995). ISBN 0-7499-1491-2 & ISBN 0-7499-1741-5.
- India: Food & Cooking London: New Holland (2007). ISBN 978-1-84537-619-2.
