= Dr. Shroff's Charity Eye Hospital =

Healthcare organization in Delhi, India

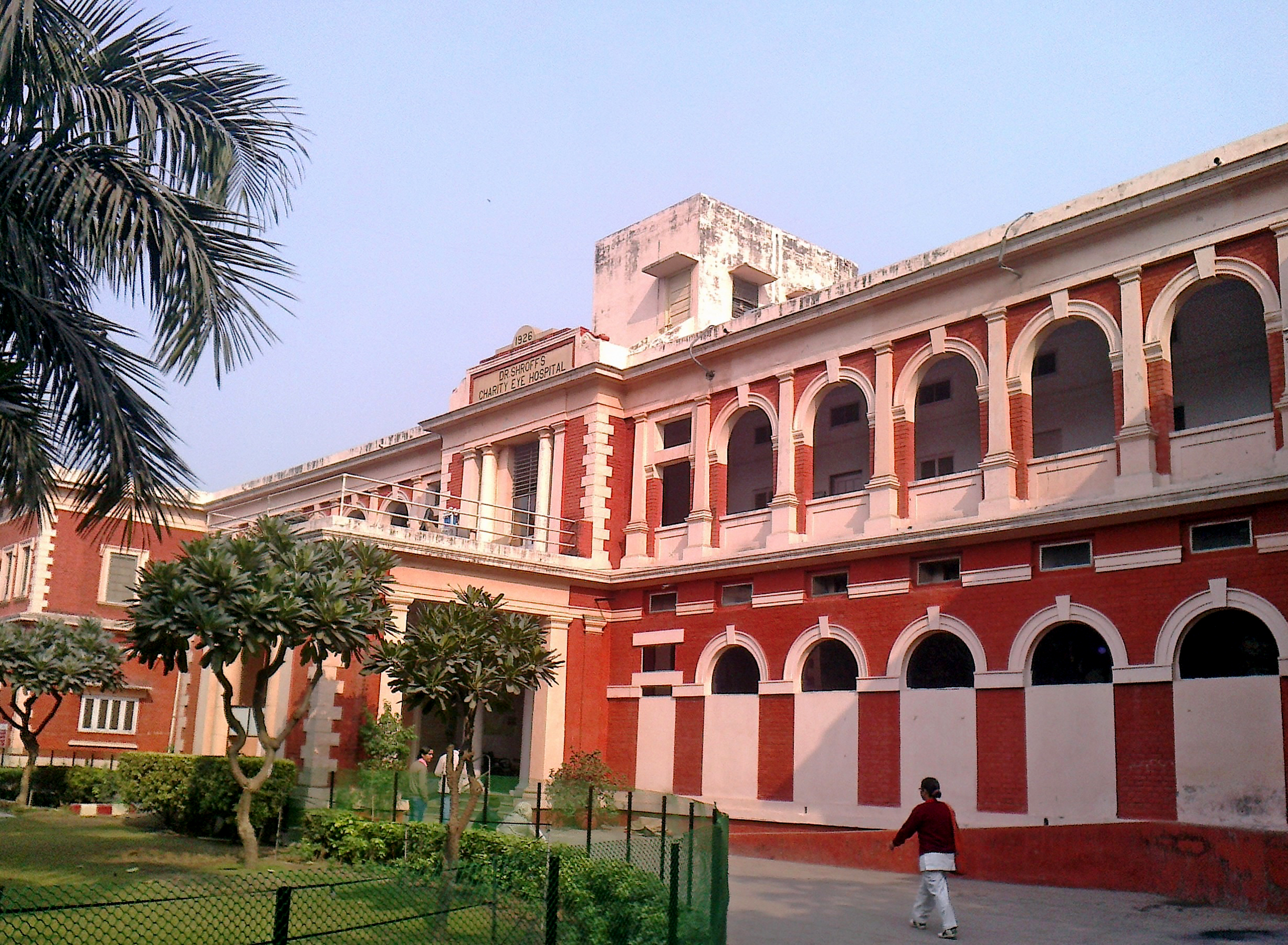
Dr. Shroff's Charity Eye Hospital, estd. 1926 in Daryaganj, Delhi

Dr. Shroff's Charity Eye Hospital was established by Dr. Sorabji P Shroff, who started to practice in India in 1914. Two of his grandsons, also ophthalmologists, are on the board of the hospital. The present building in Daryaganj was opened in 1927. It specialises in otorhinolaryngology as well as ophthalmology.

== Overview ==
It is empanelled in Govt. of India's CGHS, and was one of the first hospitals to sign up to the Ayushman Bharat Yojana scheme in 2018.

It runs a training scheme for allied ophthalmic personnel. In October 2018, all the trainees were women. They get three months of classroom training in medical and computer skills and basic English, followed by practical experience, with a stipend to help cover their costs. 85% of the students go on to work in the hospital. It also has a two-year program for trainee surgeons, who are placed in secondary centres where they can get intensive cataract training and then can further do a year of speciality training.

The hospital has a tertiary centre located at Daryaganj, central Delhi. There are secondary centers in UP, RAJASTHAN, UTTARAKHAND. It working with the Relaxo Foundation to set up a three-year project in Tijara to provide sustainable eye care services.

The Certified Ophthalmic Paramedics Initiative was launched by the hospital in 2014. It trains young women from marginalised societies to become allied ophthalmic personnel and learn life skills. This has increased the capacity of the hospital. In 2022, it is operating on more than 40,000 patients in a year and screening around 500,000 people. More than half of its paramedical human resources come from this course.

Pawan Sinha, a professor in Massachusetts Institute of Technology’s Department of Brain and Cognitive Sciences set up Project Prakash in the hospital, a program dedicated to treating early-onset blindness in children and young adults.

== See also ==
- Noshir M. Shroff
