= CBM (charity) =

CBM Christoffel-Blindenmission Christian Blind Mission
- Abbreviation: CBM
- Established: 1908 (118 years ago)
- Types: charitable corporation, nonprofit organization
- Legal status: Registered association
- Aim: Improving the quality of life of people with disabilities
- Headquarters: Bensheim
- Country: Germany
- Membership: 65 (2024)
- Chief Executives: Thorsten Schmidt
- Revenue: 338,494,611 (2025)
- Total Assets: 98,416,329.73 (2025)
- Employees: 615 (2025)
- Volunteers: 65 (2019, 2024)
- Awards: DZI Seal-of-Approval

Christian Blind Mission (CBM) is an international Christian development organization, committed to improving the quality of life of persons with disabilities in the poorest communities of the world. It is considered one of the world's oldest and largest organizations working in this field. CBM was founded in 1908 by the German pastor Ernst Jakob Christoffel, who built homes for blind children, orphans, physically disabled, and deaf persons in Turkey and Iran. Initially CBM's efforts were focused on preventing and curing blindness but now cover other causes of disability.

CBM has offices in 24 countries worldwide. The head office is in Bensheim, Germany.

CBM targets the people affected by disability by supporting local partner organizations to run programs in the fields of healthcare, rehabilitation (community-based rehabilitation – CBR), education and livelihood opportunities. In 2017 the international mental health charity BasicNeeds merged into the Christian disability charity.

CBM also advocates for disability inclusion following UN guidelines in international policy-making bodies, and campaigns and raises funds through its member associations. CBM has an emergency response team to respond to conflicts and natural disasters.

CBM reached a total of 5.5 million people in 2021. It was active in 46 countries, supported 492 projects and worked with 352 partner organizations, including disabled people's organizations, mission agencies, local churches, self-help groups and relief agencies.

Until the end of 2019, CBM operated as a federation with 11 member associations worldwide and its own program-implementing umbrella organisation (CBM International). In 2020, CBM International was united with the German member association to form the CBM Christoffel-Blindenmission Christian Blind Mission e. V. (CBM) to strengthen the effectiveness and efficiency of the worldwide program work. Member associations from the United States and Canada are part of CBM. They have had support of the Canadian government. They have been given a four-out-of-four star rating by Charity Navigator.

The other former member associations of CBM International from Italy, Australia, New Zealand, the United Kingdom, Ireland, Kenya, South Africa, Austria and Switzerland continue their work independently of the organization that emerged from CBM International and CBM Germany.

In 2017 CBM was the joint winner (along with Sightsavers) of the 2017 António Champalimaud Vision Award (the world's largest scientific prize in the field of vision) recognizing its work in supporting blindness prevention, alleviation and rehabilitation programs in developing countries.
