= Dal makhani =

Dish originating from the Indian subcontinent

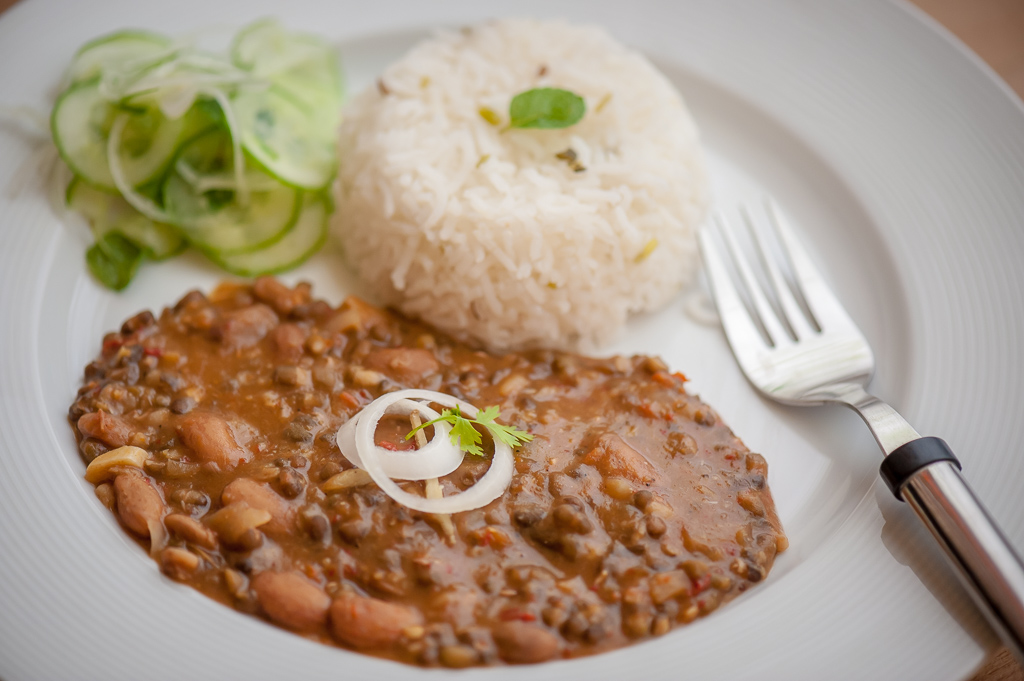
- Dal makhani served with steamed white rice
- Alternative names: Urad ki dal, mash ki dal, maa ki dal
- Place of origin: Indian subcontinent
- Region or state: Punjab
- Associated cuisine: Indian, Pakistani
- Main ingredients: urad dal (black gram)
- Food energy (per serving): 350 kcal (1,500 kJ)
- Similar dishes: Butter chicken Paneer makhani

Dal makhani (Punjabi pronunciation: [daːl ˈmək.kʰə.ni]) is a dish originating in the Punjab region. A relatively modern variation of traditional lentil dishes, it is made with urad dal (black beans) and other pulses, and includes butter and cream.

== Etymology ==
Dal means lentils or pulses. Makhan is the Punjabi word for butter. Makhani means buttery.

== History ==
Kundan Lal Jaggi and Kundan Lal Gujral were both Punjabi Hindu migrants from Peshawar, who had already invented the butter chicken in the Moti Mahal restaurant, in the Daryaganj neighborhood of Old Delhi, during the early 1950s, after the Partition of India. They were now looking to create a vegetarian dish that would complement it.

A regular diner at the restaurant that Jaggi and Gujral ran suggested that something exciting could be created out of urad dal commonly used in traditional dishes, leading to the invention of dal makhani.

== Preparation ==
Dal makhani is traditionally prepared by first soaking urad dal and red kidney beans (rajma) overnight. The soaked lentils and beans are then boiled or pressure-cooked until tender.

Separately, a tadka (tempered oil mixture) is prepared by heating ghee in a pot, then adding onions, a bay leaf, and an optional cardamom pod. The onions are sautéed until golden brown, and ginger-garlic paste is added until the raw aroma dissipates. Tomato puree, Kashmiri chili powder, and garam masala are stirred into the mixture and cooked until the oil separates.

The boiled lentils and beans are then combined with the masala and simmered on low heat, occasionally mashing some of the lentils to achieve a creamy texture. Kasuri methi (dried fenugreek leaves) and butter are added toward the end, and the dish is cooked until thick and creamy.

Dal makhani is typically garnished with a small amount of cream or yogurt and chopped coriander. It is commonly served with jeera rice (cumin-flavored rice) or naan.

== See also ==
- List of legume dishes
- Punjabi cuisine
