= Advanced Eye Hospital and Institute =

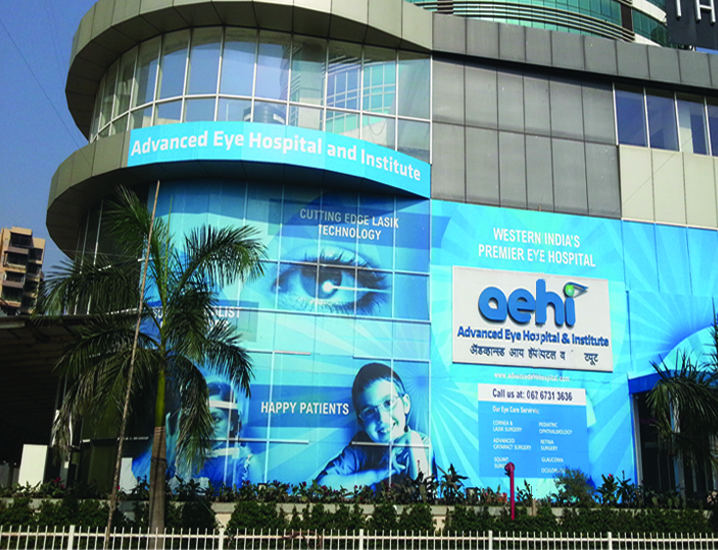
- The main hospital building

Geography
- Location: Navi Mumbai, India, Maharashtra, India
- Coordinates: 19.057013°N 73.003215°E

Organisation
- Type: Specialist

Services
- Speciality: Ophthalmology

History
- Founded: 2012

Links
- Website: http://www.advancedeyehospital.com

Advanced Eye Hospital and Institute (AEHI) is a specialist eye hospital in Navi Mumbai, Maharashtra.

== History ==
Advanced Eye Hospital and Institute was launched in 2012. It was founded by cornea specialist and Stanford alumnus Vandana Jain and pediatric urologist and healthcare entrepreneur Arbinder Singal.

== Departments ==
Advanced Eye Hospital and Institute currently is the largest eye hospital in Navi Mumbai and has specialists in cornea, cataract and refractive surgery, retina, pediatric ophthalmology, neuro-ophthalmology, oculoplasty and facial aesthetics. Apart from being a major healthcare hub for the local population, the hospital and Institute also receives a large number of international patients

== Outreach and Community Ophthalmology ==
The hospital and Institute conducts annual diabetic retinopathy camps It also works in association with its One Vision Trust to regularly perform free eye surgeries for the lesser privileged members of society. The hospital and Institute has been covered by the media for its social initiatives such as eye donation awareness drives, noting trends in prevailing eye concerns and directives issued on various eye care problems.

== Tamaso Ma Jyotir Gamaya ==
'Tamaso Ma Jyotir Gamaya' (literally translated as 'from darkness to light' or 'Eyegiri' is an annual event organised by AEHI. Organised as an event to increase awareness regarding eye donation and corneal blindness in India, this even has become an annual event with over 3000 participants featuring in the walk in 2014 and 2015.

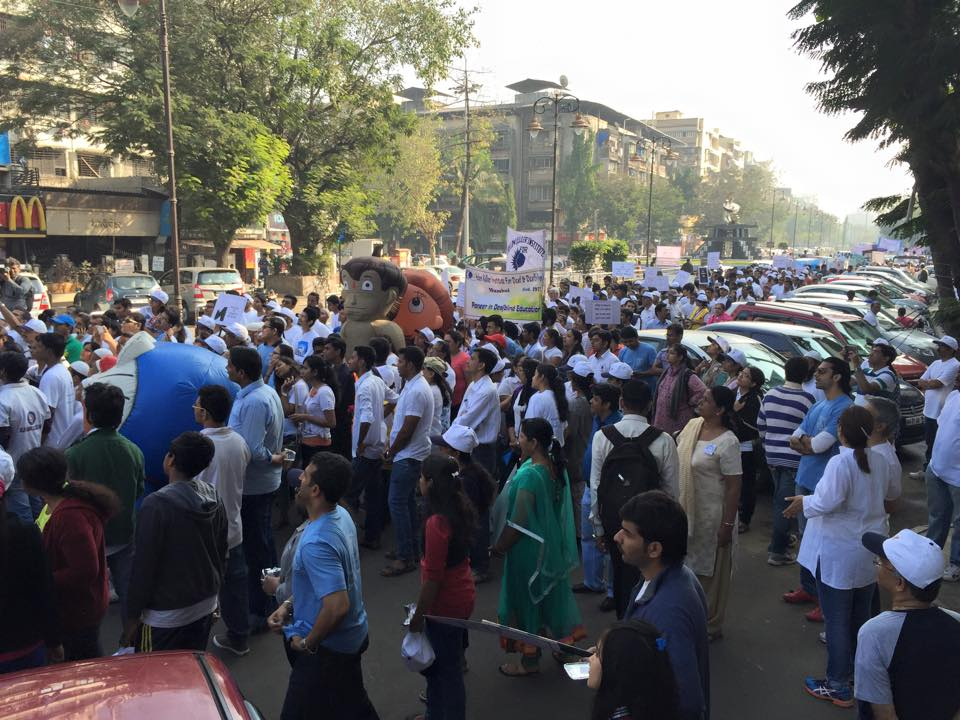
Crowds at Tamaso Ma Jyotir Gamaya, An Eye Donation Walk organised by AEHI, Navi Mumbai, January 2015

== See also ==
- Medical tourism
