= Akhand Jyoti Eye Hospital =

Indian eye hospital

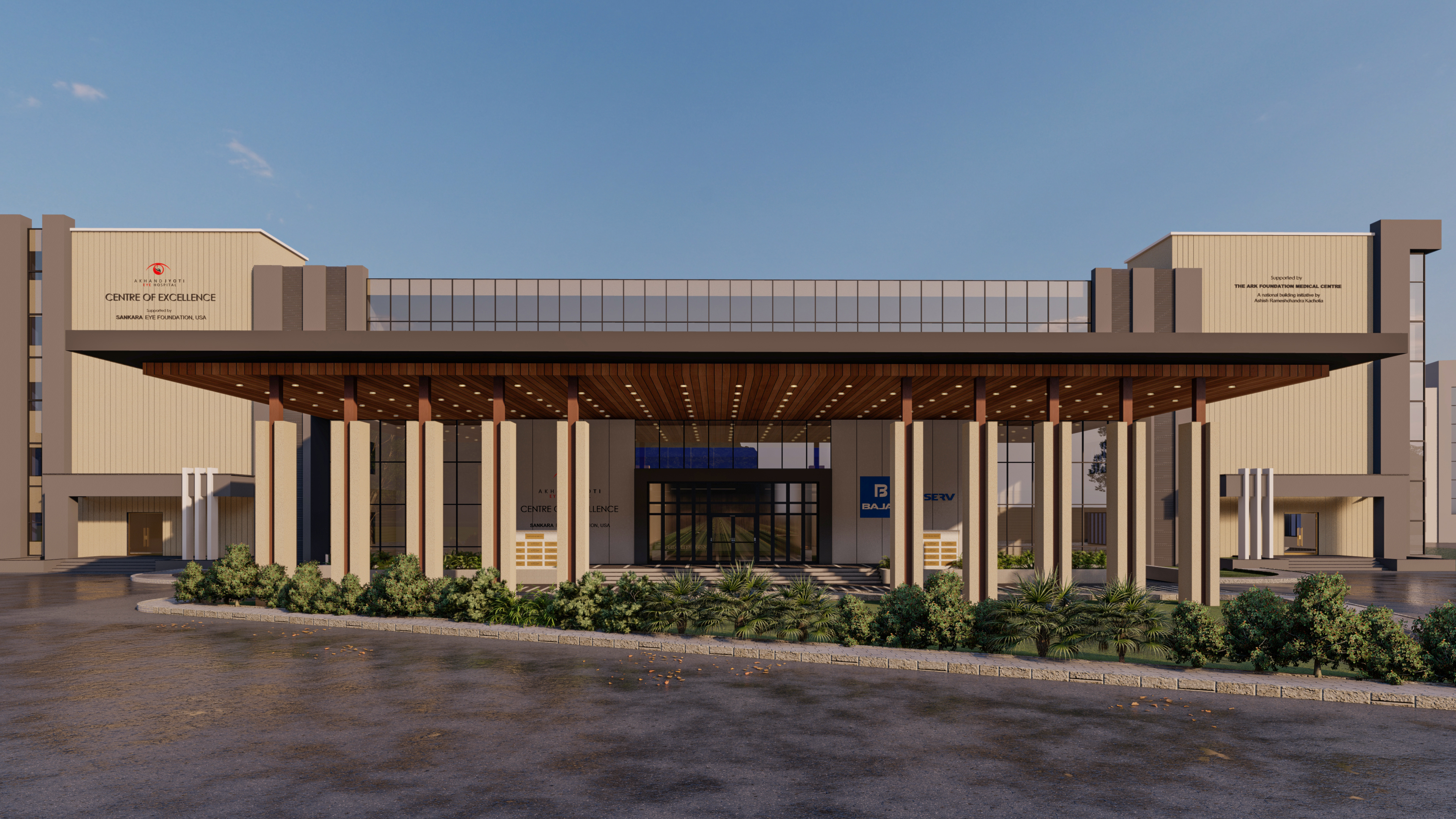
- Akhand Jyoti Eye Hospital

Geography
- Location: Saran, Bihar, India
- Coordinates: 25°52′7.72″N 85°2′10.37″E

Services
- Beds: 880+

History
- Founded: November 16, 2004; 21 years ago

Links
- Website: https://www.akhandjyoti.com https://www.akhandjyoti.org

Akhand Jyoti Eye Hospital (AJEH) is an eye hospital in India owned and run by Yugrishi Shriram Sharma Acharya Charitable Trust (YSSACT), a secular, non-profit charitable trust registered under the Indian Registration Act of 1908. The trust was established on 16 November 2004 in Kolkata, West Bengal, India. Under Akhand Jyoti Eye Hospital, the trust provides eye care services to the community through eye camps, eye hospitals, eye clinics, and other social programs.

== History ==
Yugrishi Shriram Sharma Acharya Charitable Trust was formed on 16 November 2004 in Kolkata, West Bengal, India by the Executive Trustee Mritunjay Kumar Tiwary along with other trustees. The trust initially focused on helping the poor and downtrodden in Bihar. The trust started the Akhand Jyoti Eye Hospital in December 2005 at village Mastichak in Saran district, 45 km away from the capital city of Patna in Bihar, India. The trust works in the low-income geographies of India. The eye hospital started with a 10-bed facility in 2005 and grew to a network of 5 eye hospitals with 880+ beds. In 2019, the girls empowerment program "Football to Eyeball" was initiated.

On June 8, 2019, the hospital was honored with the "Shri Dharamsey Nansey Oman Award" for Outstanding High Quality High Volume Comprehensive Eye Care Service Delivery at the 15th annual conference of Vision 2020. The hospital was also recognized by the Organisation of Pharmaceutical Producers of India (OPPI) for its contributions to rural healthcare and improving access for the poorest sections of society.

In October 2020, Akhand Jyoti Eye Hospital was awarded the "Sri S N Shah Award" by Vision 2020. The hospital received the "Dr. Jordan Kassalow VisionSpring Award" in October 2021, also from Vision 2020, for its work on refractive errors. In 2022, the hospital was honored with the "Rural India Healthcare Excellence Award" at the Indo-Asian Business Excellence Summit by Business Connect.

== Activities ==
=== Blindness Elimination Programme "Nayan Suraksha Mission" ===
Akhand Jyoti Eye Hospital aims to eliminate curable blindness by providing eye care services. Operating 5 eye hospitals and over 41 eye clinics across Bihar, Uttar Pradesh, and Uttarakhand, the hospital performs more than 145,000 eye surgeries annually. The 5 eye hospitals are located in Mastichak (Saran), Patna, Dalsinghsarai, Purnea and Ballia (UP). It is the largest super-speciality eye hospital network in Eastern India, with 80% of its sight-restoring surgeries provided free of charge to patients from low-income areas. The hospital's outreach team conducts door-to-door visits in villages and organizes eye camps to identify blind and visually impaired individuals. Patients are transported to the hospital's surgical centers for cataract surgery and returned home post-surgery.

=== Girls Empowerment Programme "Football to Eyeball" ===
Through this program, Akhand Jyoti Eye Hospital provides opportunities for girls aged 12–16 to train as professional footballers or optometrists. The initiative aims to address gender-based inequalities, exploitation, and child marriage in provincial Bihar, promoting equal opportunities for girls.

== Operations ==
The registered office is located in Kolkata, West Bengal, India, and the project office is located in Saran, Bihar. The organization has more than 1,000 employees. It is managed by Mritunjay Kumar Tiwary, Founder and Executive Trustee, and six more trustees.
