= Paneer makhani =

Paneer curry dish in India

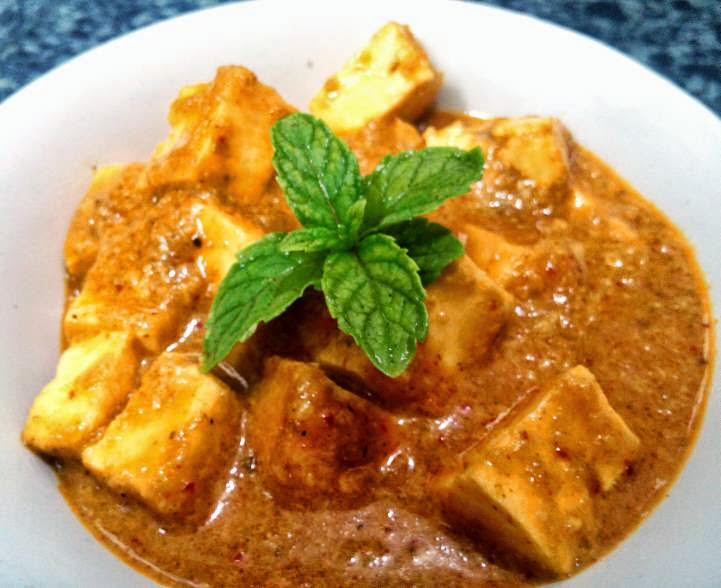
- Paneer makhani
- Place of origin: India
- Region or state: Delhi
- Associated cuisine: Indian
- Similar dishes: Butter chicken, dal makhani

Paneer makhani (also called paneer butter masala) is an Indian dish of paneer, originating in New Delhi, in which the gravy is prepared usually with butter (makhan), tomatoes and cashews. Spices such as red chili powder and garam masala are also used to prepare this gravy.

A survey in June 2016 found that paneer butter masala was one of the top five foods ordered in the Delhi-NCR region and Bangalore.

== Etymology ==
Makhan is the Hindustani word for 'butter'. Makhani means 'butter'. This dish originated in the 1950s at Moti Mahal restaurant in Delhi. Kundan Lal Jaggi invented the dish by mixing fresh butter into a tomato-based curry.

== Recipe ==
There is no strict set of steps to make this sauce. Below is one of the ways in which makhani sauce is prepared.

- Frying a fine paste of ground cashew nuts, onions and tomatoes.
- Adding spices like cardamom and bay leaf.
- Usage of sour curd into the sauce (though in some preparation methods only tomatoes are used).
- Generous usage of butter.
- Usage of garam masala, red chilli powder, kasuri methi and coriander leaves.

== See also ==
- Indian cuisine
- North Indian cuisine
- Punjabi cuisine
- List of Indian dishes
- Tandoori chicken
- Dal makhani
- Butter chicken
- Chicken tikka masala
