= Daryaganj =

Daryaganj Darya Ganj
- subdivision
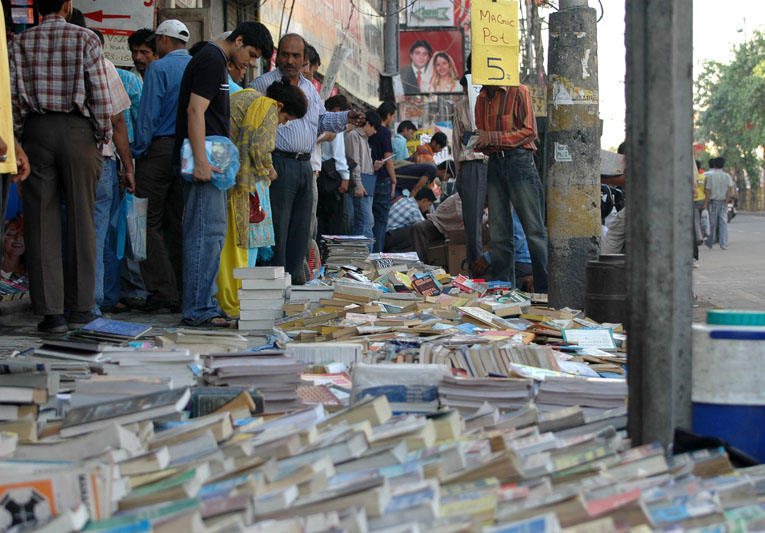
- Sunday Book Market

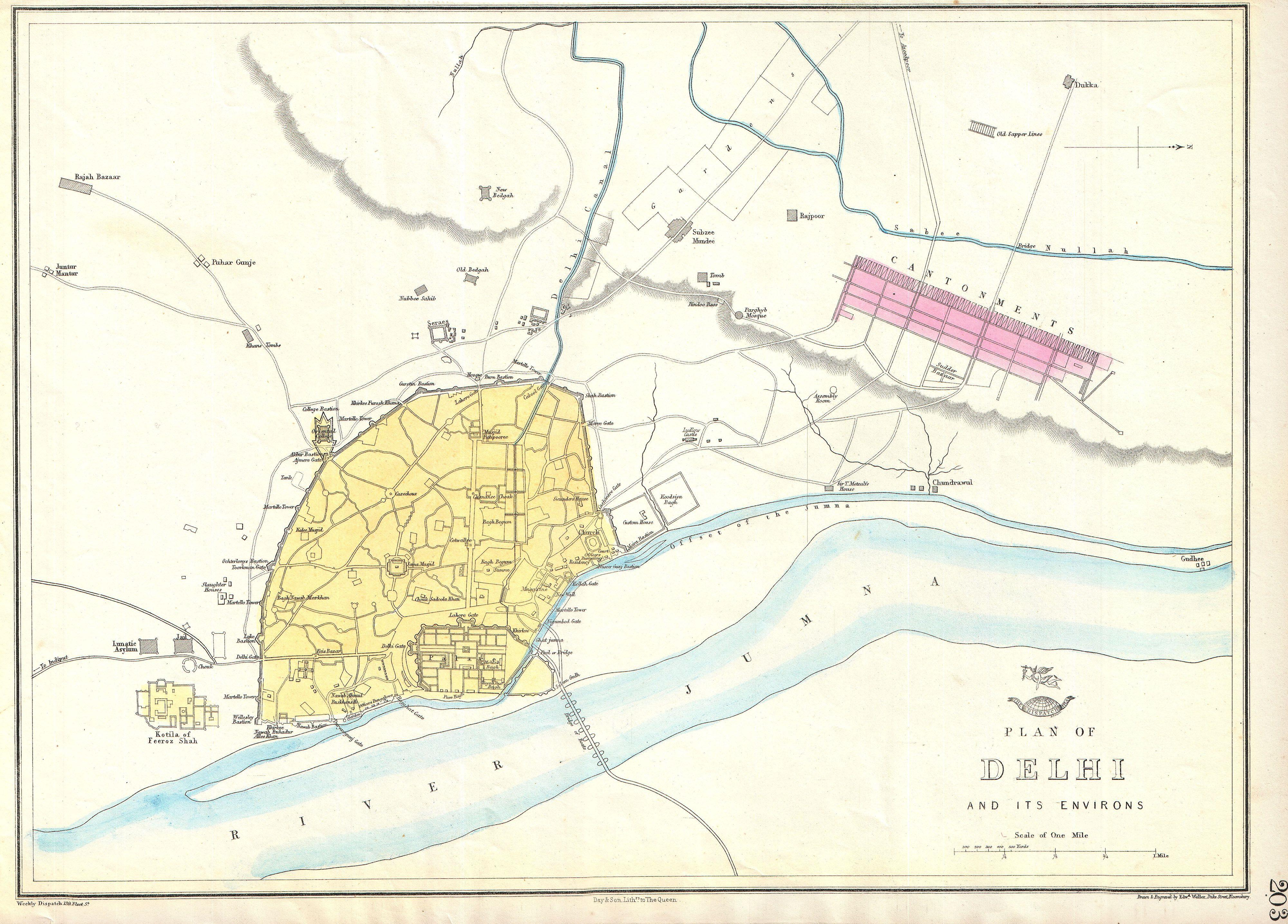
- Historic map of Shahjahanabad (now called Old Delhi), 1863, depicting Daryaganj

- Location in Delhi, India
- Coordinates: 28.6443°N 77.2420°E
- Country: India
- State: Delhi
- District: Central Delhi

Government
  - Body: Municipal Corporation of Delhi

Population
  - Total: 123,459−3,459,807

Languages
  - Official: Hindi, English, Urdu, Punjabi
- Time zone: UTC+5:30 (IST)
- PIN: 110 002
- Civic agency: MCD

Daryaganj (literally "A market near a river") is a neighbourhood of Delhi inside the walled city of Old Delhi. The "darya" (lit. "River") refers to the river Yamuna which stood just outside the walled city, straddling its eastern ramparts until it was diverted further east by the victorious British after the Siege of Delhi in 1857. Daryaganj is one of the three sub-divisions and also the administrative headquarters of the Central Delhi District. It starts at Delhi Gate, at the edge of Netaji Subhash Road, which goes towards Red Fort.

== History ==
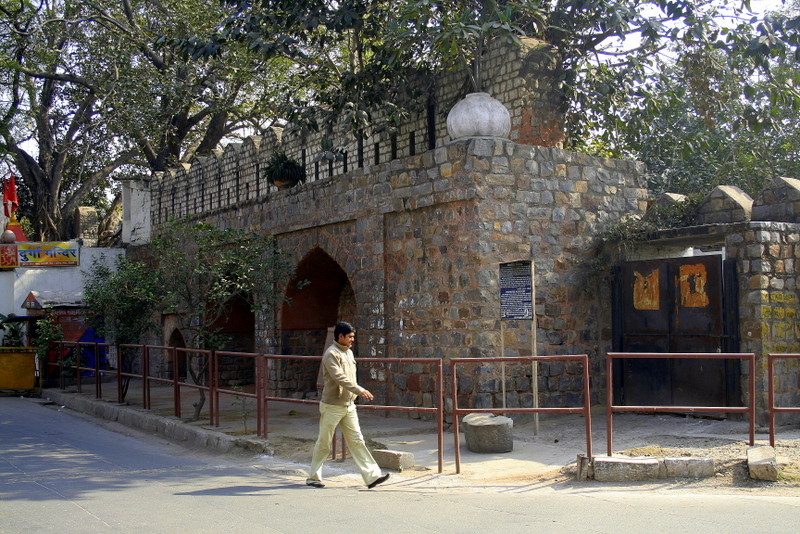
Portion of the city wall of the walled city of Shahjahanabad, Ansari Road, Daryaganj

During the Mughal Empire, aristocrats and nobles had their mansions in Daryaganj; some examples include the famous late Mughal-era kothi of the Nawab of Jhajjar and the haveli of Walidad Khan, the father-in-law of Mughal emperor Bahadur Shah Zafar. After 1803, a native regiment of the Delhi garrison was stationed, which was later relocated to the Ridge area. Now known as New Darya Ganj, it once formed part of the British Darya Ganj Cantonment, one of the earliest establishments of the British in Old Delhi. The New Darya Ganj market was previously known as Faiz Bazaar until the partition of India, when present traders moved into the area.

East of Daryaganj was the Raj Ghat gate of the walled city, opening at Raj Ghat on Yamuna River. The Phool Mandi (Flower Market) of Daryaganj was established around 1869, and even today, notwithstanding it serving a small geographical area, it is of great importance owing to its dense population.

As the new capital New Delhi took shape and was being built after 1911, Daryaganj, along with Paharganj, were the only two buffer areas between the new city and the older city: the latter started being called the "walled city" by 1931, with Daryaganj sitting at the edge of the walled city near Dilli Gate.

== Overview ==
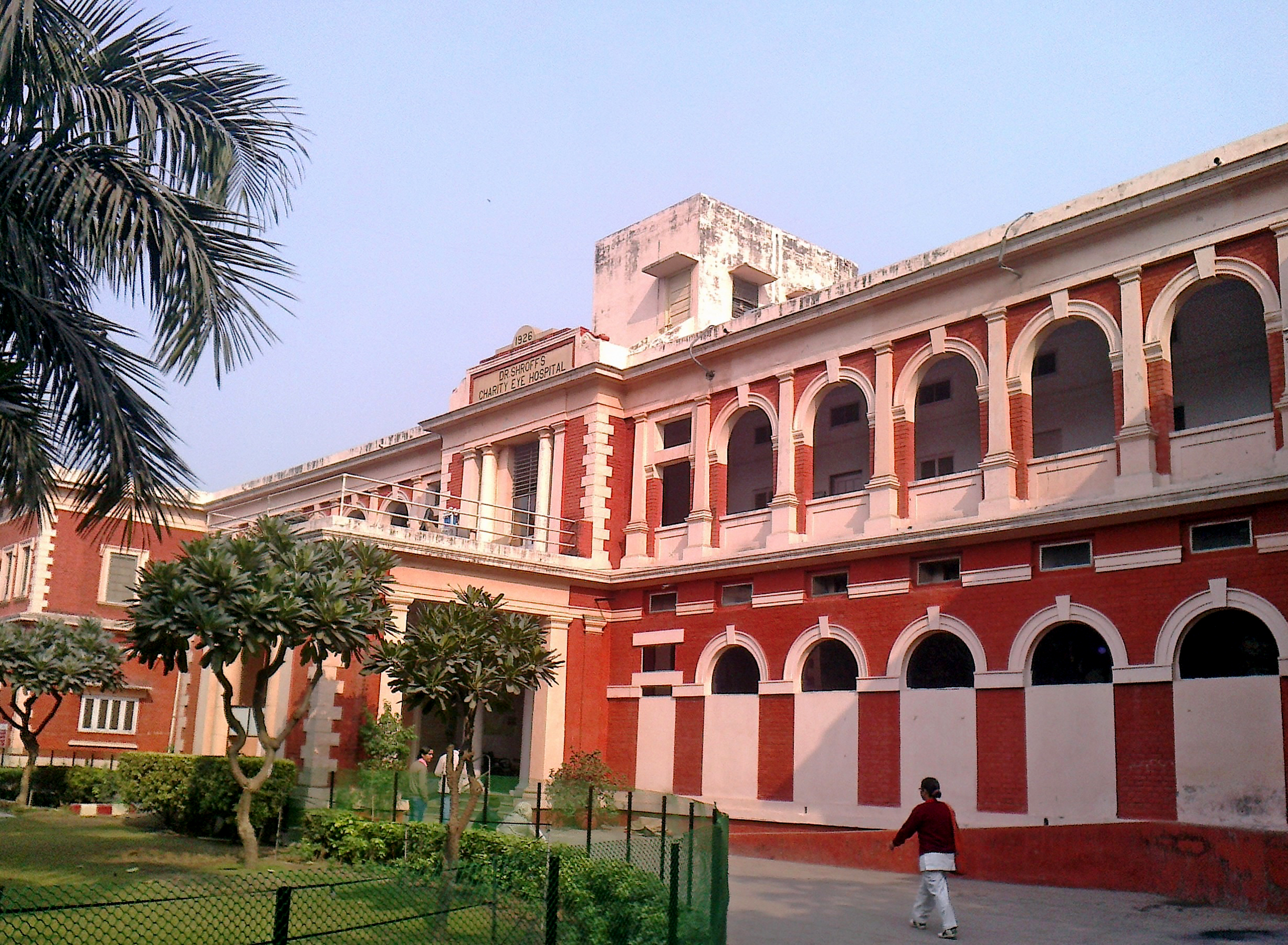
Dr. Shroff's Charity Eye Hospital, established in 1926, one of the many eye hospitals in Daryaganj

Daryaganj continues to be a major commercial hub of modern Old Delhi. Netaji Subhash Road, which begins at Delhi Gate and heads towards the historic regions hosting Red Fort, Jama Masjid and Chandni Chowk, passes through the middle of the area, which is a short walk away.

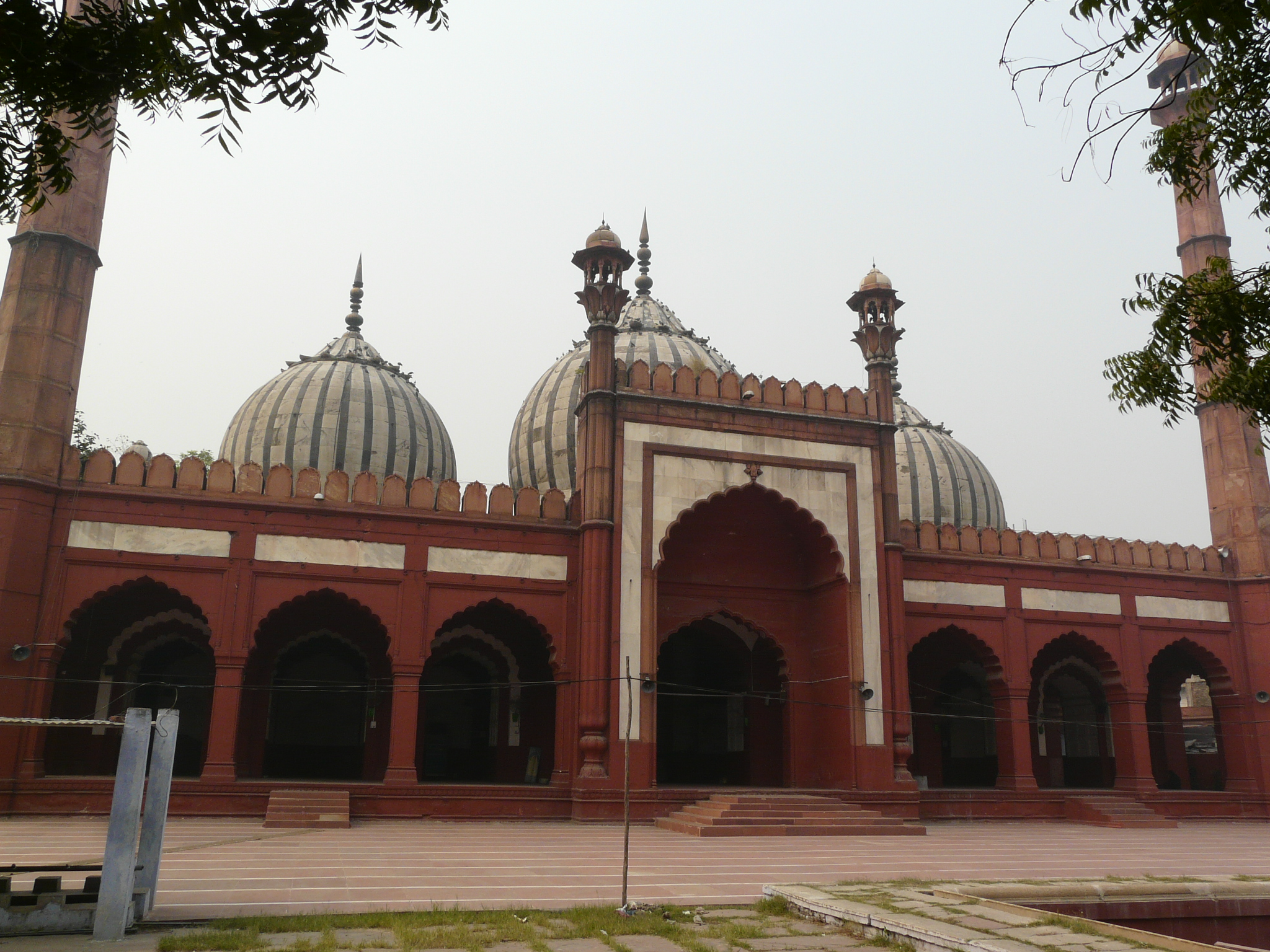
Zeenat-ul-Masajid, a Mughal era mosque which was converted into a bakery by the vengeful British after the Siege of Delhi in 1857

The area also has several eye hospitals and clinics, including Dr Shroff's Charity Eye Hospital, which opened in 1917. The district bustles with shoppers from Monday to Saturday, and, on Sunday, is home to India's largest platform market for magazines and second-hand books.

Daryaganj was also prominent for its all-time favourite markets like the Sunday Book Market or the Kitab Bazaar (Book Market), that was held every Sunday on street pavements (Sunday being a weekly holiday for the shops) before it shifted to Mahila Haat, close to the original location. The market, established around 1964, today stretches almost for 2 kilometres, and one may find books on virtually any genre or specialisation here at throwaway prices. The former President of Pakistan, Pervez Musharraf, was born in and used to live at Nehar Wali Haveli in Daryaganj before migrating to Pakistan after the Partition of India in 1947.

Today, Darya Ganj is quite renowned all over the country, thanks to the numerous book publishers whose offices are based in the locality. Ranging from S. Chand & Co. to Prentice Hall India and Oxford University Press, these are primarily located on Ansari Road, an inner road on the eastern side of Daryaganj and its neighbouring areas. Daryaganj is also home to the Hans, a Hindi literary magazine, restarted by writer Rajendra Yadav in 1986; it was founded by Premchand, a pioneer in Hindi literature.

Darya Ganj also features one major cinema hall called Golcha, which opened in 1954, and is considered one of the oldest cinemas of Delhi. It was closed in 2017.

== Demographics ==
According to the most recent census, Daryaganj has a total population of 271,108, with 143,293 males (52.9%) and 127,815 females (47.1%). The area is characterized by a diverse religious composition, with Muslims constituting the majority at 175,501 individuals (64.7%). Hindus make up the second-largest group, numbering 89,320 (32.9%). Other religious communities include Christians (1,548, 0.6%), Sikhs (1,061, 0.4%), Buddhists (130, 0.05%), and Jains (2,926, 1.1%).

Religious Demographics of Daryaganj (2021 Census)
1. Muslims (64.7%)
2. Hindus (32.9%)
3. Christians (0.60%)
4. Sikhs (0.40%)
5. Buddhists (0.05%)
6. Jains (1.10%)

== Cuisine ==
Daryaganj also has what was once the only restaurant of Old Delhi, the Moti Mahal, founded by Kundan Lal Jaggi, Thakur Das Mago, and Kundan Lal Gujral, popular for the invention of butter chicken and modern dal makhani.

== Sources ==
- "History Of Daryaganj, Delhi". Moscow Batteries.
- H.C. Fanshawe (1998). Delhi, past and present. Asian Educational Services. ISBN 81-206-1318-X.
