= Malupota =

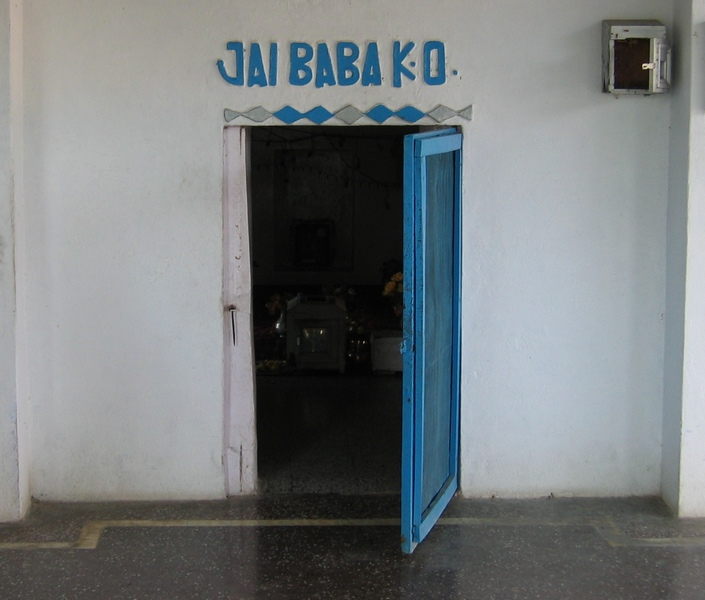
Entrance to temple in the name of Baba Khan Das, the founder of Malupota

Malupota is a village in the district of Nawanshahr, in the state of Punjab in India. The village lies 8 km from the Rahon-Chandigarh road, and has its own railway-station. The total area is 55 acres (220,000 m^{2}).

Malupota's Pin Code is 144505. Pin Code is also known as Zip Code or Postal Code

This is a historical village, this village has one of the 22 manjis which were established by 3rd Sikh guru - Guru Amar Das Ji to spread Sikhism in the world. This village has still kept that place in its original structure.

Malupota was founded by Baba Khan Das. Malupota has a temple in his name.

In December 2020, The efforts of the people of this village were highly praised with their contribution to the protest against the 2020 Indian agriculture reform. They distributed 10 Quintal (1000 kg) of Desi Piniyan for the farmers protesting in Delhi.
