= Punjabi tandoori cooking =

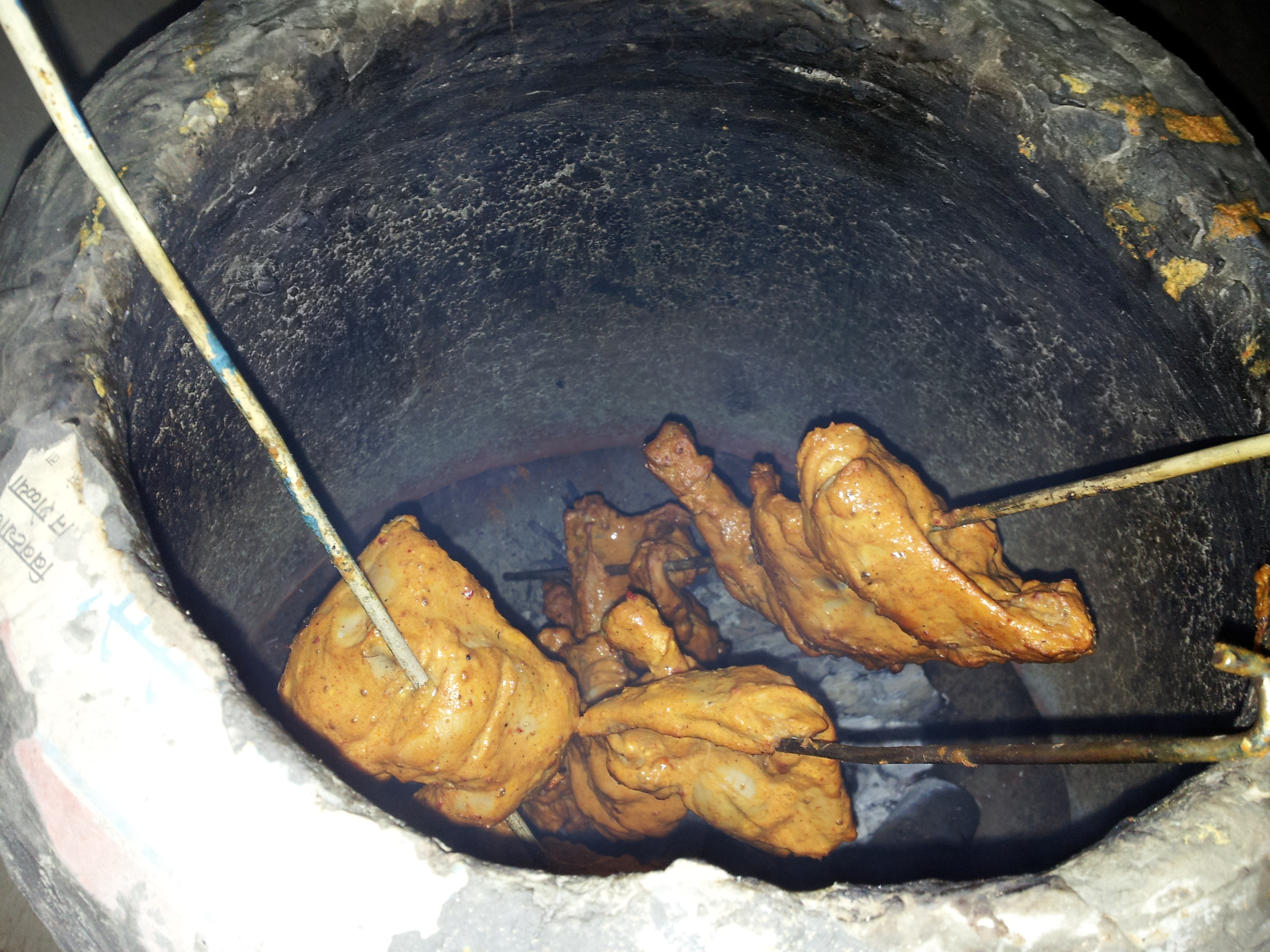
- Example of Punjabi tandoori cooking, being cooked is Tandoori chicken.
- Place of origin: Punjab region
- Region or state: South Asia
- Created by: Punjabi people

Punjabi tandoori cooking is done in a clay oven known as the tandoor, which originated from the Punjab region in Pakistan and northwestern India and is used to cook Punjabi food. Traditionally, households in Punjab have tandoors to make roti, naan, and tandoori chicken. Communal tandoors are also traditional in the rural areas of Punjab.

== Punjabi tandoori cooking ==
Punjabi tandoori cooking includes:

=== Tandoori Roti ===
Villages in Punjab had open-air tandoors where housewives would bring their dough to be rolled into rotis by the tandoorwali.

=== Lachha Paratha ===
Lachha paratha is baked in the tandoor and is round in shape with multiple layers.

=== Amritsari Kulcha ===
Amritsari Kulcha is a crisp, flaky roti made with refined flour; It is stuffed with potato, onion, black pepper, chilli, cumin, and dried pomegranate seeds (anardana) and cooked in the tandoor.

=== Tandoori Chicken ===
Dishes similar to tandoori chicken may have existed during the Harappan civilization. According to archaeologist and vice-chancellor of Deccan College Professor Vasant Shinde, the earliest evidence for a dish similar to tandoori chicken can be found in Harappan civilization and dates back to 3000 BCE. His team found ancient ovens at Harappan sites which are similar to the tandoors popular in the Punjab. Physical remains of chicken bones with char marks have also been unearthed. However, tandoori chicken as a dish originated in the Punjab before the independence of India and Pakistan. In the late 1940s, tandoori chicken was popularised at Moti Mahal in Peshawar by Kundan Lal Jaggi, Thakur Dass, and Kundan Lal Gujral, who are all Punjabi as well as the founders of the Moti Mahal restaurant.

=== Naan ===
Punjabi naan is a white-flour, yeasted flat bread enriched with a little ghee. Its tear-shape comes from being slapped on the side of a tandoor oven and baked partly hanging vertically.

=== Other ===
- Amritsari tandoori chicken.
- Tandoori chicken kebab.

== Tandoor ==
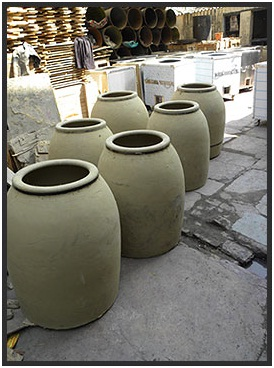
Tandoors

Punjabi tandoori cooking is cooked in a tandoor (Gurmukhī:ਤੰਦੂਰ; Shahmukhi:تندور). The tandoor in Punjab is also known as tanoor.

=== Design ===
Harappan oven structures may have operated in a similar manner to the modern tandoors of the Punjab. The tandoor is traditionally made of clay and is a bell-shaped oven, set into the earth and fired with wood or charcoal reaching high temperatures. According to Hayter (1992) the original versions of the tandoor "in the Punjab, a province in the north-west of India, were sunk neck deep in the ground". He further states that modern versions can also rest above the ground. Planalp (1971) notes that "the Panjab-style underground oven known as tandur is becoming increasingly popular in New Delhi" pointing to the Punjabi style of the tandoor.

=== Use ===
The tandoor method of cooking was indigenous to the northwest frontier province, now Pakistan, and the Punjab". The use of the Punjabi tandoor is associated with Punjabi cooking in undivided Punjab. Punjabis have traditionally used the tandoor on a regional level to cook meat dishes and breads. The use of the tandoor is so entrenched in Punjabi culture that it forms a part of Punjabi folk songs. The tandoor in the Punjab is considered a social institution. In the villages of the Punjab, the communal tandoor, dug in the ground, is a meeting place."

The use of the tandoor became popular in other regions of India, after the 1947 partition with the arrival of Punjabi refugees. Punjabis leaving West Punjab resettled in areas such as Delhi. The cuisine of Delhi was "affected by the Punjabi influx after Partition. The clay oven (tandoor) and numerous Punjabi specialities were introduced". The rest of India was introduced to the "magic of the tandoor".

=== Tandoor distinguished from bhathi ===
The Punjabi tandoor is to be distinguished from the Punjabi bhathi, an oven, which can be made out of bricks or mud and clay and is fired from an opening on one side. The bhathi is closed at the top with a metal cover and the smoke is emitted through a cylinder.

== See also ==
- tandoor
- Tandoori chicken
- Punjabi cuisine
- Punjabi bhatti
- Punjabi Saag
