= Punjabi bhathi =

Type of oven

The Punjabi bhathi (Punjabi: ਭੱਠੀ) is an oven used in the Punjab region. The bhathi is similar to a masonry oven.

== Design ==
The traditional Punjabi bhathis used in the Punjab region are constructed as follows: a hole is dug in the ground and a cylindrical opening is constructed at the far end of the hole for the smoke to escape from the bhathi. The sides of the hole are then plastered with clay and a round wall is constructed above the ground. On one side of the bhathi, an opening is created to put wood, bamboo leaves and grass to burn the fire. The top of the bhathi is left open but covered with a large metal utensil which is filled with sand to provide extra heat. In the Punjab, toasting corn and wheat grains on the bhathi is a traditional delicacy. The toasted seeds are also traditionally mixed with jaggery.

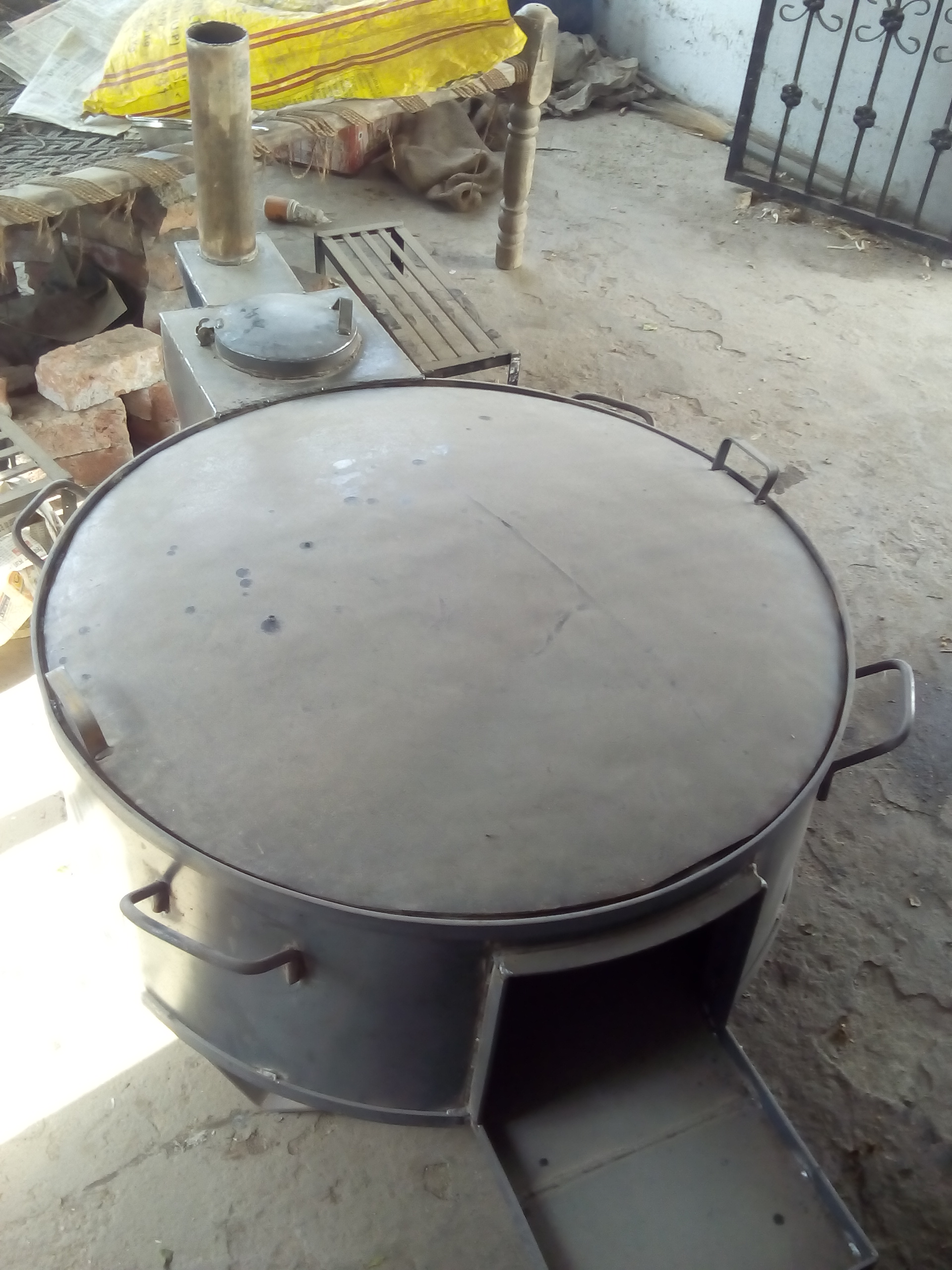
Metallic Bhathi built on the lines of traditional Punjabi Bhathi.

In the past, every village had many Punjabi bhathis but this tradition is slowly losing importance.

== General ==
Bhathis are extensively used in Rajasthan and in the Punjab region.

The traditional bhathis used in Rajasthan (called bhatti) are closed at the top and utensils are put inside the structure to cook items such as barley grains.

The other type of bhathi is the open top structure where griddles or large utensils are placed on the top of the structure to cook in bulk.

== See also ==
- Tandoor
- Tandoori chicken
- Punjabi cuisine
- Punjabi tandoor
