= Bhatura =

Deep-fried bread from the Indian subcontinent

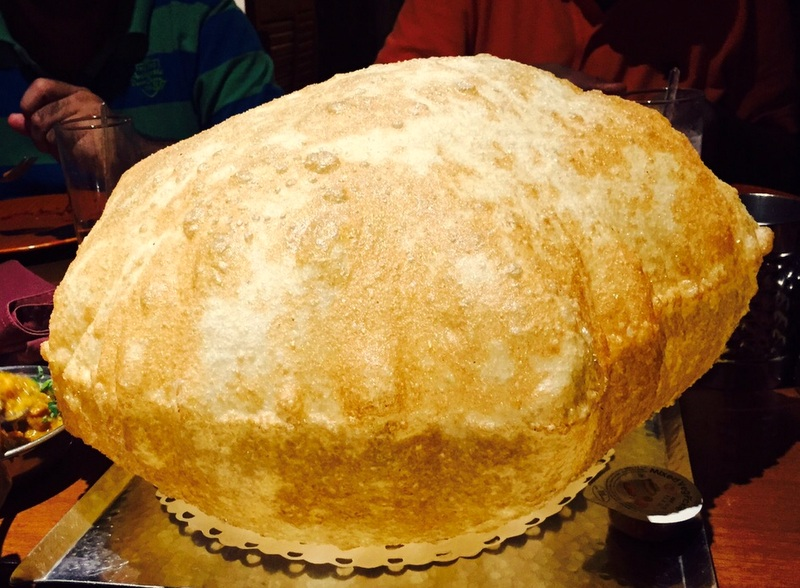
- Type: Flatbread
- Course: Breakfast, lunch
- Associated cuisine: North Indian cuisine
- Main ingredients: Maida, yogurt, yeast
- Similar dishes: Naan, kulcha, puri

Bhatura (IPA: [bʰəʈuːɾaː], pl. bhature; also spelled bhatooru) is a puffed, deep-fried, sourdough leavened flatbread commonly served for breakfast. Originating in North Indian cuisine, it is also eaten in other regions. Similar to naan, it is made with maida flour and leavened using yogurt, which produces lactic acid bacteria. It puffs up when fried and has a soft, fluffy texture. It is sometimes eaten as street food or as festival food. Paired with chickpea curry, it forms a dish called chole bhature.

== Preparation ==
A bhatura is a single-layer flatbread made with maida flour (and sometimes semolina) and leavened with either yogurt (as dahi puri) or curd (as khamiri puri). Other typical ingredients include yeast, though it may instead be leavened with baking soda, and oil or ghee. The dough is kneaded, soured, and fermented overnight. Lactic acid in the yogurt results in a sourdough fermentation, with the primary yeasts being Saccharomyces cerevisiae and lactic acid bacteria. The fermentation starter is known as malera. The dough is then rolled into circles and deep-fried until they puff up and lightly brown, with a soft, fluffy, elastic texture.

As a fried food, bhatura contains a high level of fat. It has a trans fat level of 9.5% per 100 grams, over twice that of french fries. Despite being fermented, it is not highly probiotic due to the cooking temperature. By modifying the fermentation starter, bhatura can be enriched with the amino acid GABA. A 2001 study by J. Dogra et al. found that soy flour may improve the quality of bhatura.

Bhatura resembles puri, but is made with leavened dough. Bhatura has a similar dough to kulcha or naan, but is deep-fried. According to The Hindu's Vasundhara Chauhan, bhatura is either thick and spongy, which absorbs more oil, or very thin, which resembles a large puri. Stuffed bhatura is a version containing rice bean.

== History and consumption ==
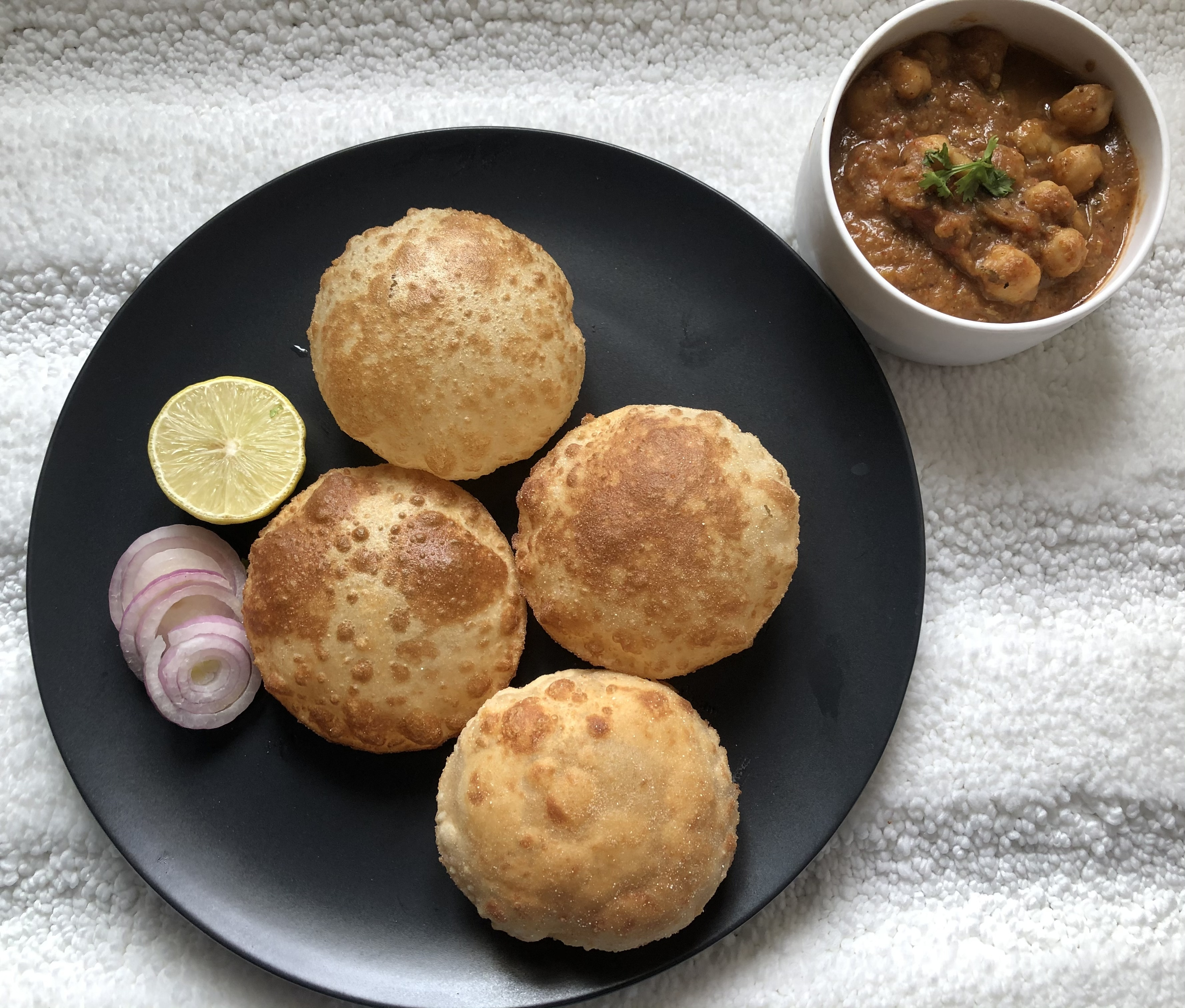
Chole bhature consists of bhature served with chickpea curry.

Bhature have existed in North India since ancient times. Bhatura, as well as puri, was part of the cuisine of Hindus in the Mughal Empire. In traditionally rice-eating South India, bhatura and other wheat-based foods have become more popular since the 1960s.

Bhatura is associated with Punjabi cuisine. In North India and East India, it is a common dish for breakfast or lunch. It is a staple in the northern states of Himachal Pradesh and Uttarakhand. Like other Punjabi dishes, it is also eaten in Sikh American cuisine, albeit less common than other flatbreads like phulka and paratha.

Bhatura is most commonly eaten as breakfast. It is also served as street food in India. During holidays, it is often consumed instead of more common grains such as rice or roti. When eaten with chana masala (chickpea curry), it forms a popular dish known as chole bhature.

== World record ==
In 2017 a group of cooks in New Delhi produced a bhatura with a diameter of 147 cm (4 ft 2 in). It was recognised by the Indian reference book Limca Book of Records as the world's largest bhatura. The cooks were sponsored by Leonardo Olive Oil, a subsidiary of U.S. food conglomerate Cargill.

== See also ==
- Punjabi cuisine
- List of Indian breads
- List of Pakistani breads
