= Chole bhature =

North Indian dish pairing flatbread and curry

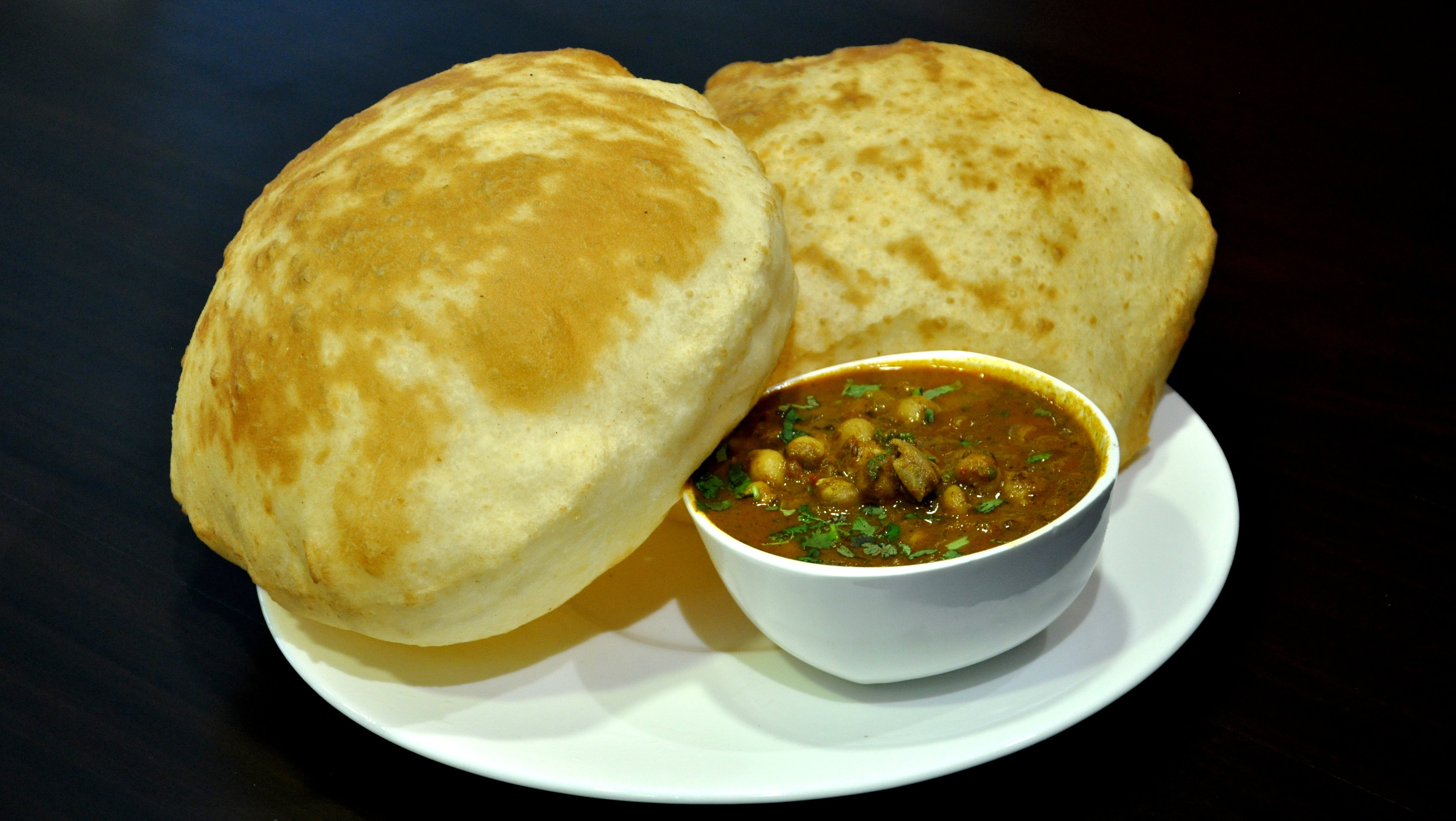
- Type: Street food, fast food
- Course: Primarily breakfast
- Place of origin: Punjab or eastern Uttar Pradesh
- Region or state: Indian subcontinent
- Associated cuisine: North Indian cuisine, Punjabi cuisine
- Serving temperature: Hot
- Main ingredients: Chana masala, bhature
- Similar dishes: Doubles (disputed)

Chole bhature (Hindi pronunciation: [t͡ʃʰoː.leː bʱə.ʈuː.ɾeː]; also known as channa bhatura) is a dish pairing chickpea curry with bhatura, a deep-fried flatbread. It is commonly eaten as a breakfast or street food. Chickpea curry dates back to the cuisine of the Mughal Empire, but the origin of chole bhature is debated, with some sources attributing its origin to Punjab. It spread to Delhi after the partition of India, where it is a popular dish. By the 2010s, it had become a popular fast food across India. The Indo-Trinidadian dish doubles is believed by some to be an adaptation of chole bhature.

== Preparation and serving ==
Chole bhature is a combination of chole (chana masala, or chickpea curry) and bhatura, a deep-fried bread made from maida (refined wheat flour). The chole is made by soaking white chickpeas before pressure cooking them in a gravy of tomatoes, onions, and spices, with a thick consistency. Chole differs from typical chana masala as it does not use tomatoes. Styles of chole include pindi chole, whose dark color results from ingredients such as amla or tea, and the pahadi style, which is red. Bhature is made of dough that is fermented before being rolled and fried, which causes it to quickly puff up before turning crispy and golden brown. The dish is served hot.

Chole bhature is primarily a breakfast dish, sometimes accompanied with lassi. It may also be served at all times of day. It is commonly served as a street food and may be accompanied by onions, chutney, achaar, or lemon slices.

== History ==
Chickpea curry dates back to the cuisine of the Mughal Empire, possibly having spread along the empire's trade routes. Chole bhature's place of origin is debated. According to BBC News's Justin Rowlatt, the dish originated in Punjabi cuisine, despite claims from other regions such as Uttar Pradesh, Rajasthan and Himachal Pradesh. Food writer Kunal Vijaykar believes it originated in pre-partition Punjab and was based on the dish pindi chole, which is named for the city of Rawalpindi, Pakistani Punjab. However, according to food scholar Charis Galanakis, it originated in eastern Uttar Pradesh.

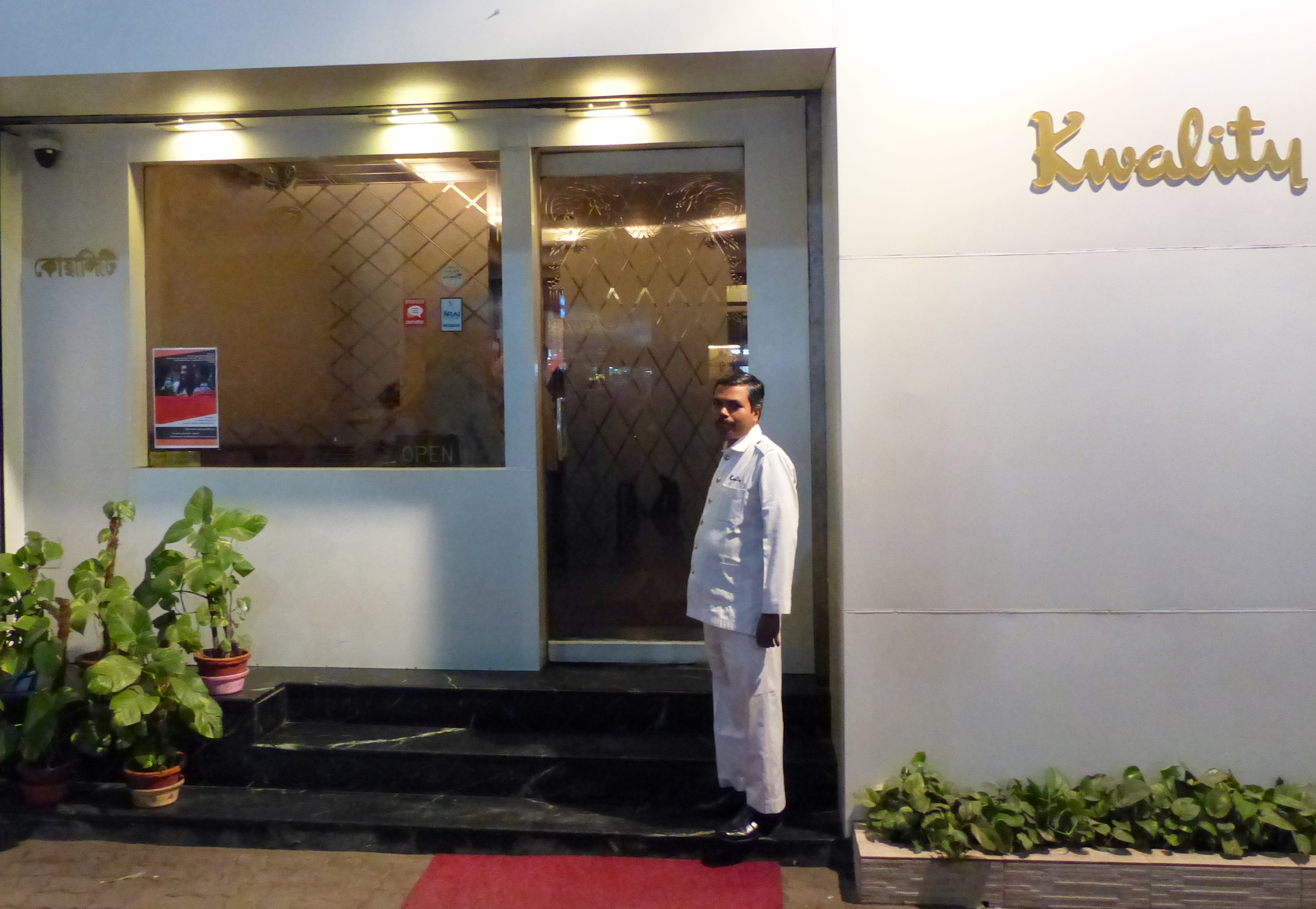
Kwality Restaurant was one of the first establishments in Delhi to serve chole bhature. (Pictured: franchise location in Kolkata)

Chole bhature spread to Delhi in the 1940s, with differing claims over who introduced it. Peshori Lal Lamba, a native of Lahore, moved to Delhi after the 1947 partition of India and opened Kwality Restaurant in the Connaught Place neighbourhood. A fine-dining establishment that also sold Anglo-Indian cuisine, it became primarily known for its chole bhature. Some consider Lamba to be the first to have paired chole with bhature. It is also widely believed that the dish was introduced to the city by Sita Ram, who also migrated from Lahore around this time. He migrated to Delhi with his son, Diwan Chand, and began selling chole bhature, a dish that had been popular in his hometown, from a food cart. This later became the establishment Sita Ram Diwan Chand in the Paharganj neighbourhood.

Beginning around the 1990s, the dish spread beyond North India to the rest of the country, becoming a typical dish at vegetarian establishments by the 2010s. It and other Punjabi dishes—such as tikki and dahi bhalla—became popular in Indian fast food, alongside the more popular South Indian cuisine. As the dish gained popularity globally, International Chole Bhature Day was created in 2012 by Delhi-based Facebook user Shashank Aggarwal, along with Anuradha Gupta. They chose the date of 2 October as it coincides with an existing public holiday, Gandhi Jayanti.

Chole bhature is sometimes said to be the origin of the Indo-Trinidadian dish doubles, especially in the view of Indians, though this is disputed. This hypothesis notes the similarity between chole bhature, when served as a wrap, and doubles. However, others consider doubles to have uniquely originated in Trinidad and Tobago. Badru Deen, a member of the family credited with the invention of doubles, wrote that the two dishes are very different; sociologist N. Jayaram supports this opinion.

== Popularity ==
Chole bhature is a popular fast food and breakfast food in North India. Chole bhature is a popular dish for celebrations. It is eaten during the Punjabi festival of Vaisakhi and other Sikh festivals.

In Delhi, chole bhature is a traditional street food that is recognised by tourists. The city has many establishments known for the dish, and residents widely debate which is best. In addition to Kwality Restaurant and Sita Ram Diwan Chand, these include Chache Di Hatti in Kamla Nagar, which receives very long lines during its short opening hours. Chole bhature is the only dish served at Sita Ram Diwan Chand, which uses paneer in its bhature. Among students of Delhi University, chole bhature has been known as C bats since around the 1970s. Mumbai also has many chole bhature establishments, especially around the Sion neighbourhood.
