= Punjabi cuisine =

Regional cuisine from the Punjab region of India and Pakistan

Punjabi cuisine is a culinary style originating in the Punjab, a region in South Asia, which is now divided into an Indian part to the east and a Pakistani part to the west. This cuisine has a rich tradition of many distinct and local ways of cooking.

== History ==
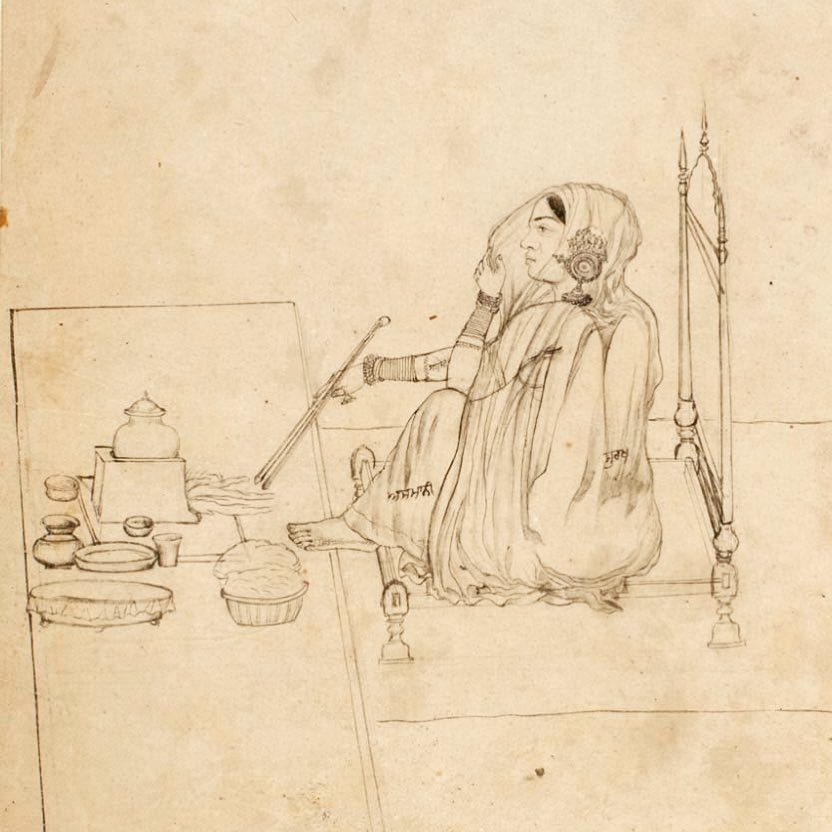
A Punjabi woman cooking, Punjab, circa 19th century

The local cuisine of Punjab is heavily influenced by the agriculture and farming lifestyle prevalent from the times of the ancient Indus Valley Civilization. Dishes similar to tandoori chicken may have existed during the Harappan civilization during the Bronze Age of India. According to the archeologist Professor Vasant Shinde, the earliest evidence for a dish similar to tandoori chicken can be found in the Harappan civilization and dates back to 3000 BC. His team has found ancient ovens at Harappan sites which are similar to the tandoors that are used in the state of Punjab. Physical remains of chicken bones with char marks have also been unearthed. Harappan houses had keyhole ovens with central pillars which were used for roasting meats and baking breads. Sushruta Samhita records meat being cooked in an oven (kandu) after marinating it in spices like black mustard (rai) powder and fragrant spices. According to Ahmed (2014), Harappan oven structures may have operated in a similar manner to the modern tandoors of the Punjab.

Basmati rice is the indigenous variety of Punjab, and various meat- and vegetable-based rice dishes have been developed using it.

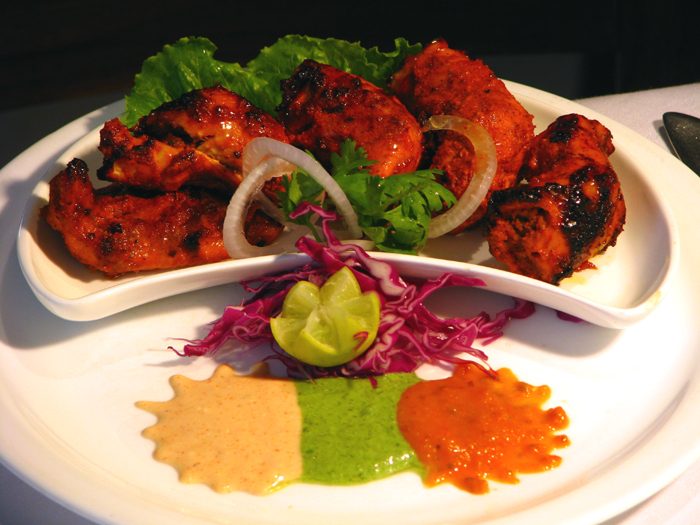
Chicken tikka is a popular dish in Punjabi cuisine

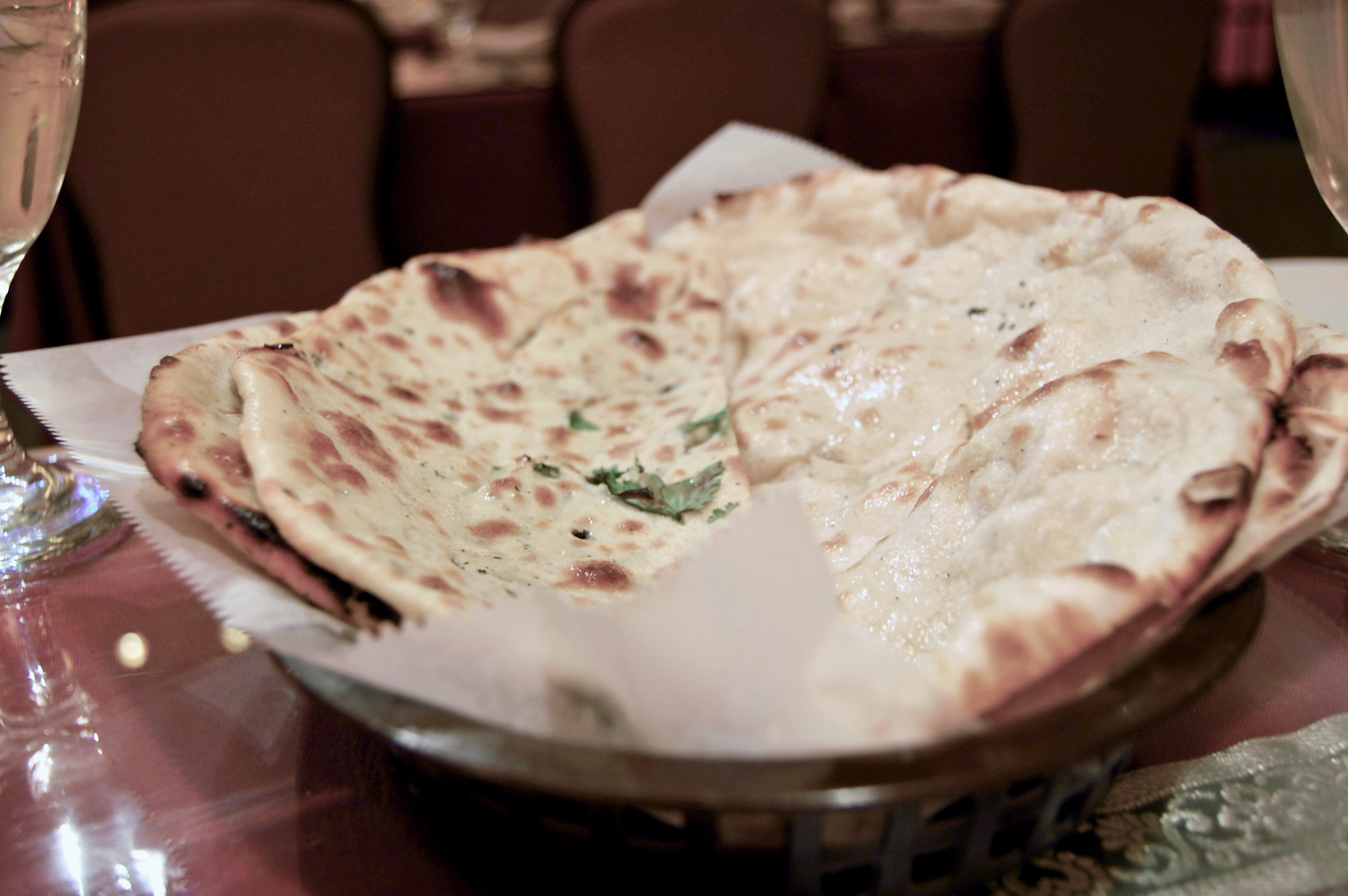
Mint paratha from Punjab, India

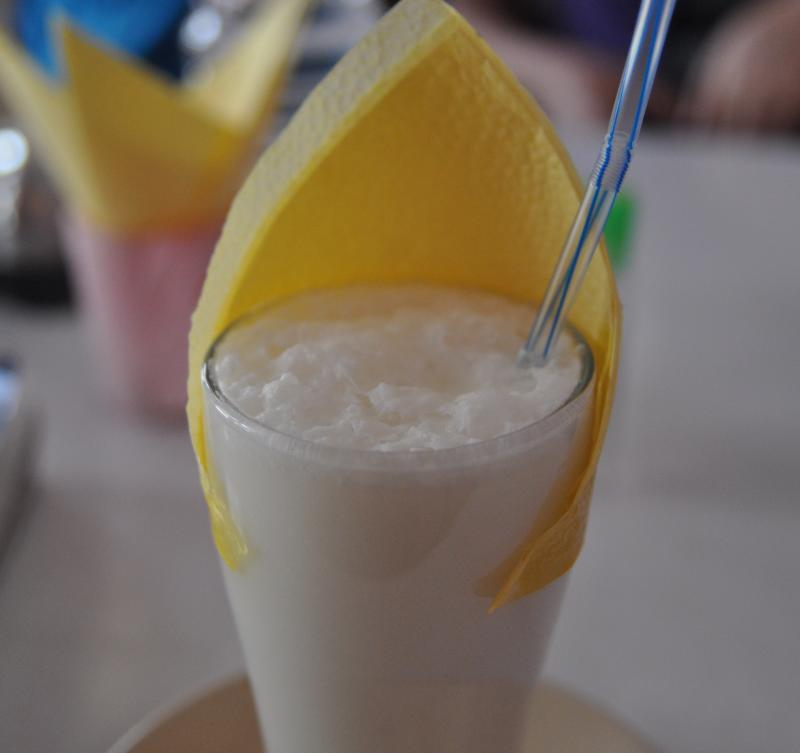
Lassi from Punjab

== Style of cooking ==
There are many styles of cooking in Punjab. In the villages many people still employ the traditional methods and equipment for cooking purposes. This includes wood-fired and masonry ovens. Modern methods include cooking on gas cookers. Tandoori style of cooking involves use of the tandoor. In India, tandoori cooking is traditionally associated with Punjab as Punjabis embraced the tandoor on a regional level. This style of cooking became popular throughout India after the 1947 partition when Punjabis resettled in places such as Delhi. According to Planalp (1971), "the Panjab-style underground oven known as tandur is becoming increasingly popular in New Delhi" pointing to the Punjabi style of the tandoor. In rural Punjab, it is common to have communal tandoors, which are also called Kath tandoors in Punjabi.

== Staple foods ==
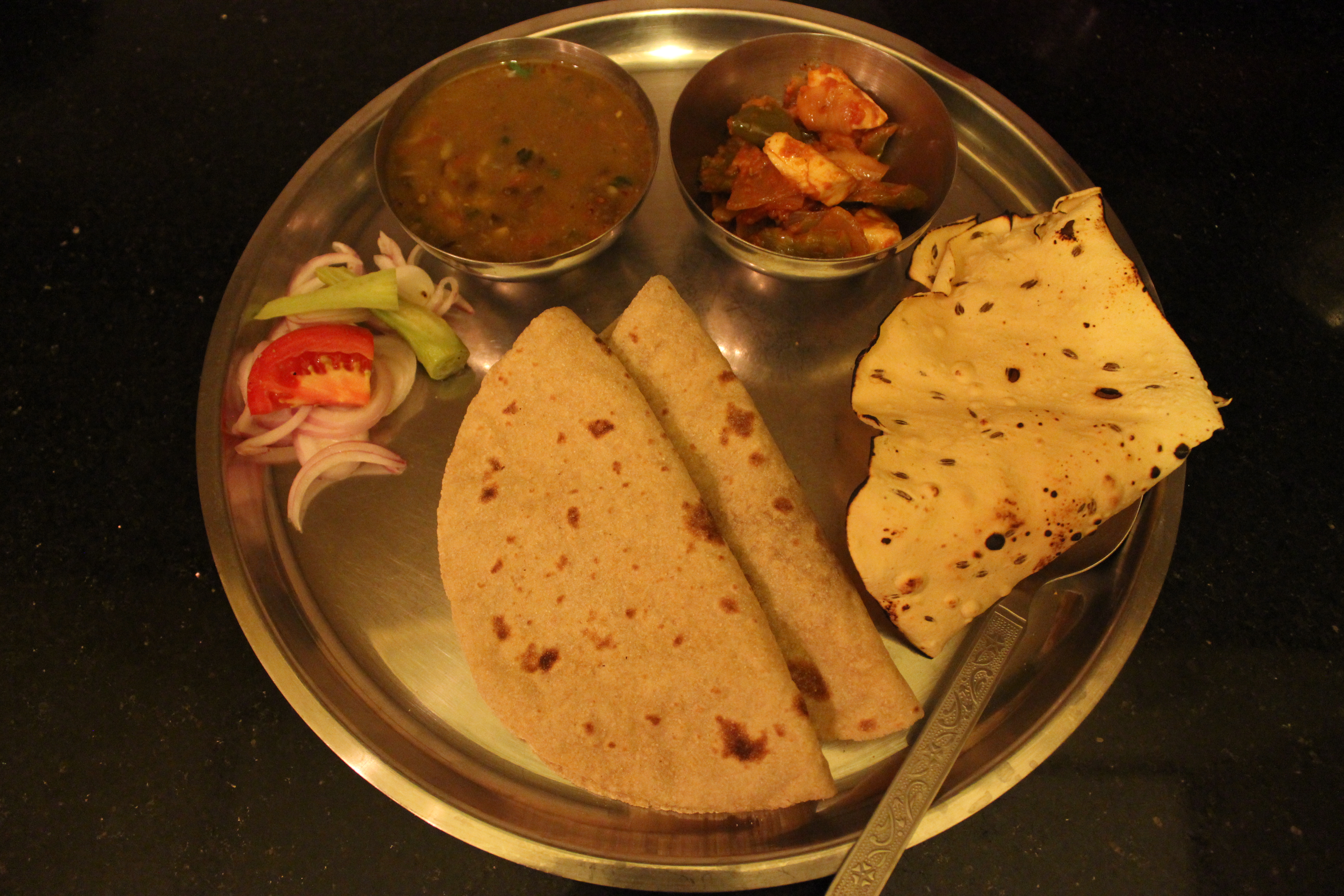
Punjabi food thali

Punjab is a major producer of wheat, rice and dairy products. These products also form the staple diet of the Punjabi people. The state of Punjab has one of the highest per capita usage of dairy products in India. Therefore, dairy products form an important component of the Punjabi diet.

Dairy products are a staple in Punjabi cuisine. Both cow milk and water buffalo milk are popular. Milk is used for drinking, to add to tea or coffee, to make homemade dahi (yogurt), for butter and making traditional Punjabi cottage cheese called paneer. Traditionally, yogurt is made every day using the previous day's yogurt as the starting bacterial culture to ferment the milk. Curd is used as dressing for many raita dishes, to prepare kadhi, to prepare cultured buttermilk (chaas), and as a side dish in a meal. Buttermilk is used in making various kinds of lassi. It may also be used in curry preparations. Milk is also the prerequisite ingredient for butter and ghee (clarified butter).

== Food additives and condiments ==
Food additives and condiments are usually added to enhance the flavor of the food. Food coloring is added to sweet dishes and desserts. Starch is used as a bulking agent.

== Common dishes ==
=== Breakfast ===
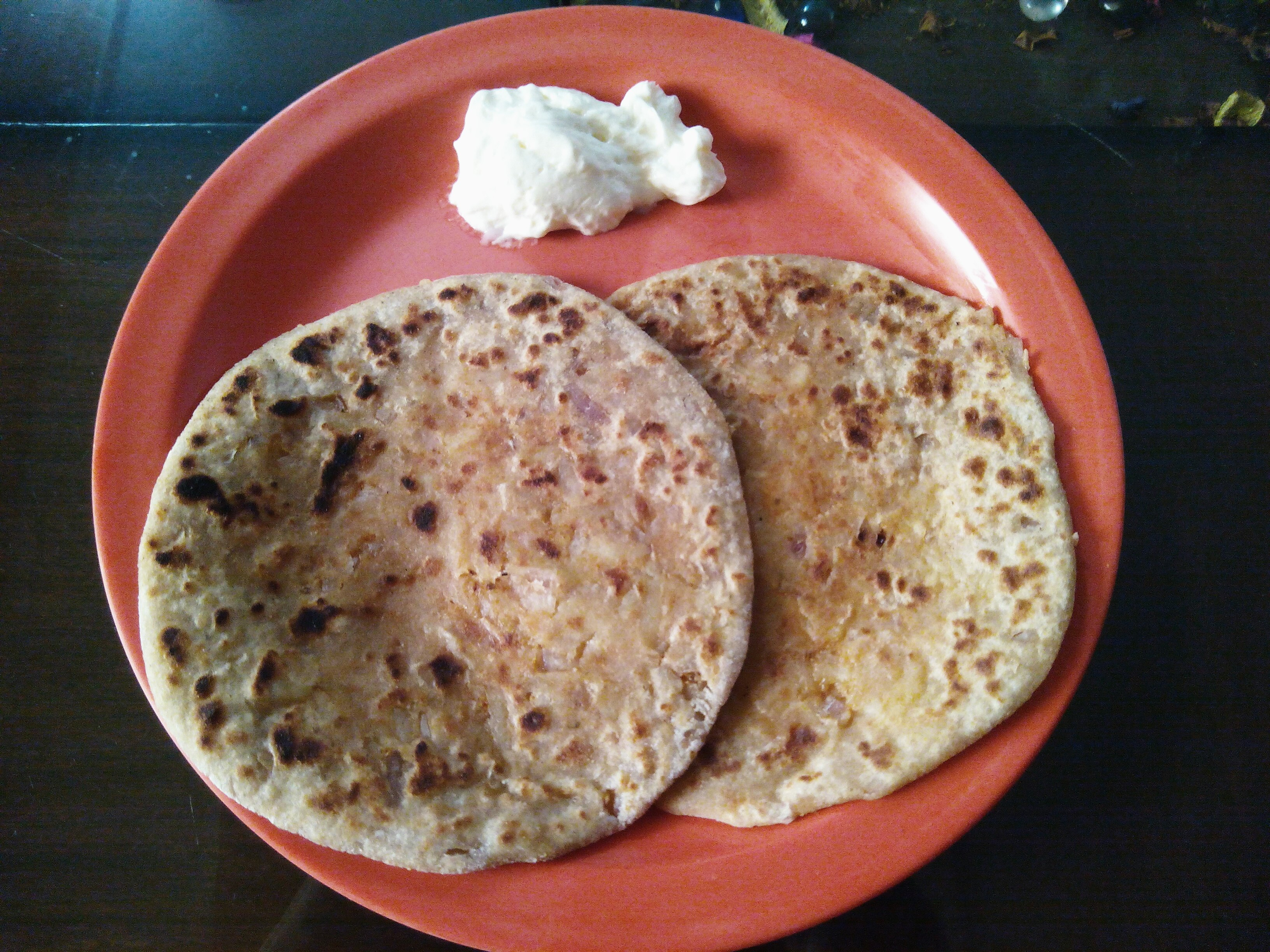
Aloo parontha with butter

Breakfast recipes with respect to different regions within Punjab vary. Commonly eaten are chana masala, nan, chole kulche, aloo paratha, paneer paratha, gobi paratha, paratha with curd, paratha with butter, halwa poori, bhatoora, falooda, makhni doodh, Amritsari lassi, masala chai, tea, Amritsari kulchas, dahi vada, dahi, khoa, paya, aloo paratha with butter, and with milk.

In the upper Punjab Pakistan the Lahori katlama is eaten for breakfast as well.

=== Meat ===
Poultry, lamb and goat meat are the preferred meat sources in different regions of Punjab.

Many dishes of meat variety are available and some of them are named below.

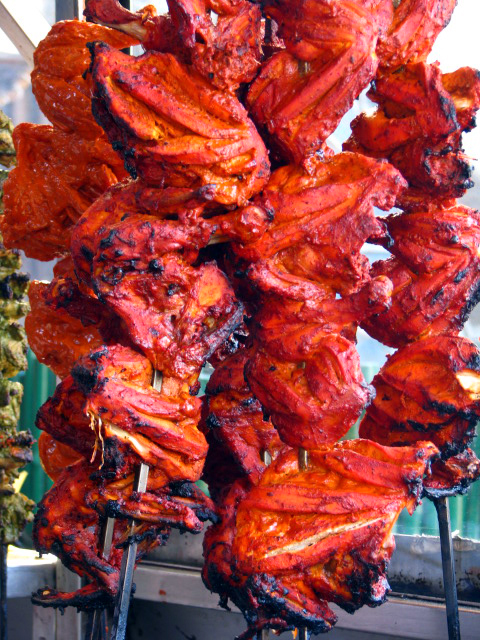
Tandoori chicken

- Biryani: lamb, chicken, and beef
- Pilaf: Beef and Lamb
- Kebab: braised chicken, beef, or lamb meat, commonly served with naan and flat bread.
- Keema: Braised minced lamb meat, commonly served with naan.
- Lamb: including rogan josh, Bhuna Gosht, Kadhai Gosht, Raan Gosht, Dal Gosht, Saag Gosht, Nihari, Rara Gosht, Paye da Shorba
- Shami kebab, chicken karahi, Amritsari tandoori chicken, Punjabi Karhi (the chicken yogurt curry of Punjab), Butter Chicken (Murgh Makhni), chicken tikka, Paye.
- Kunna Gosht, slow cooked meat prepared in Kunna (mitti ki bartan (clay utensil))
- Haleem is made of meat (beef or chicken), slow cooked with a mixture of legumes softened by overnight cooking. It is a protein rich food with spices and aromatics like nutmeg served with wedge of lemon and sautéed onions.

=== Fish ===
Since Punjab is a landlocked region, freshwater fish, and not marine fish, forms an important part of the cuisine. Carp, rohu and catfish are the most commonly prepared fish. Other fish types include thela machi and tilapia. Recently, shrimp has been introduced. Fish tikka is an Amritsari speciality.

=== Vegetarian ===
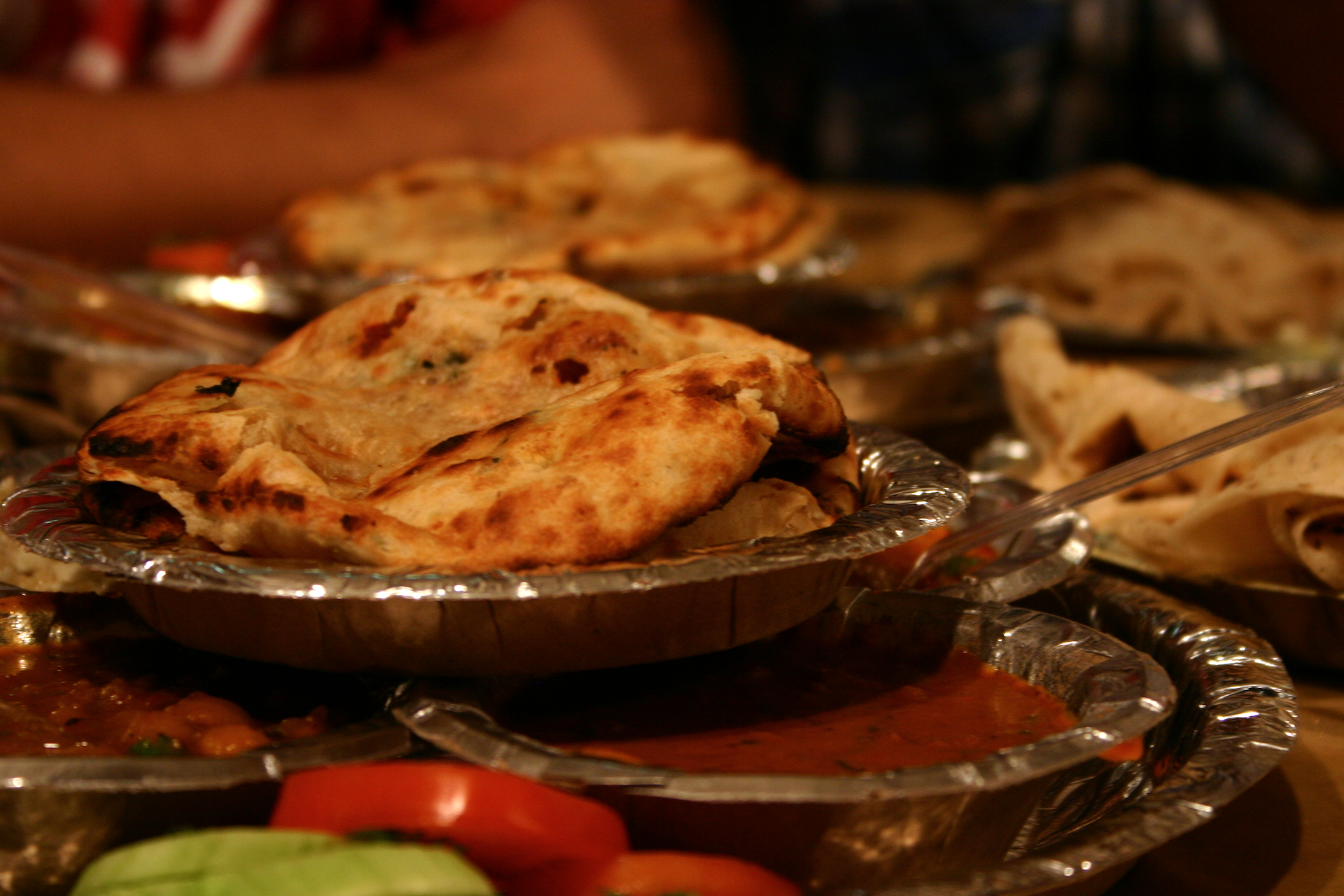
Kulcha amritsari

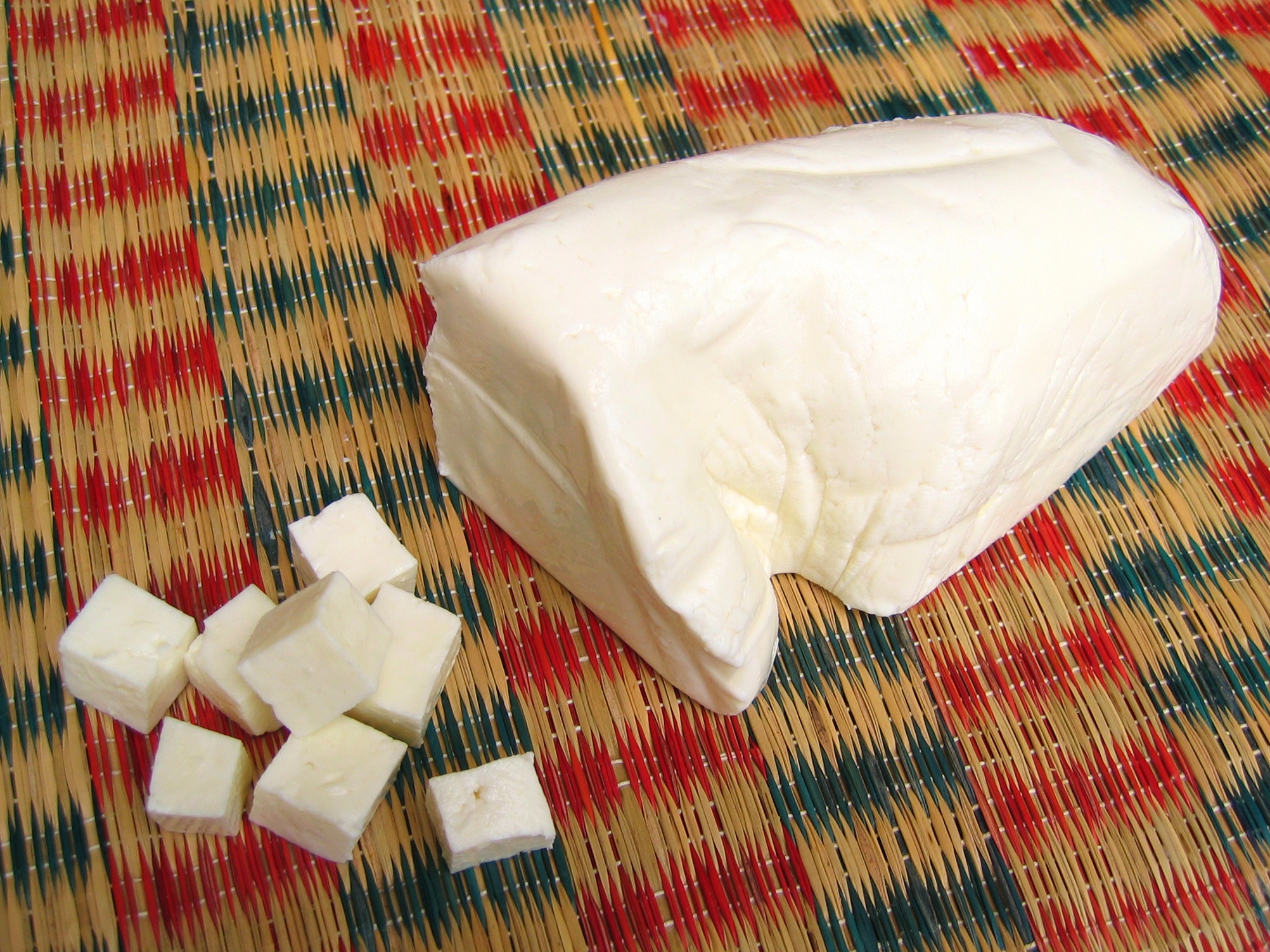
Paneer, one of the South Asian cheese variants commonly used in cooking in Punjab

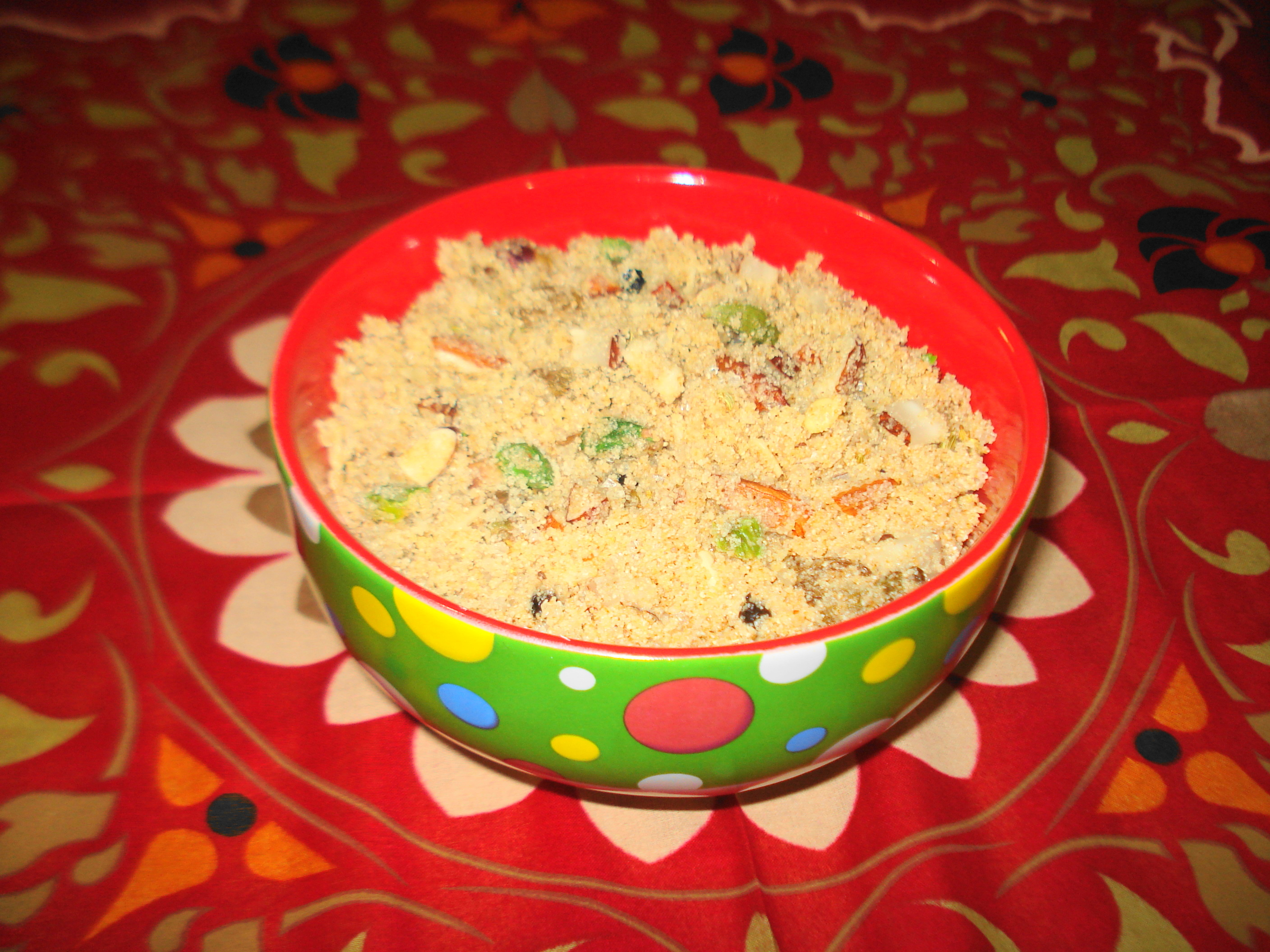
Panjeeri

- Khichdi, a grain-and-lentil dish: In the Punjab, khichdi is made of millet flour, mung beans and moth lentils (Vigna aconitifolia). However, khichdi made of rice and red lentils or mung beans is also consumed.
- Rajma is the Hindi word for red kidney beans. Beans are cooked in medium spicy onion-tomato gravy and most often served with steamed rice and sometimes with Indian flatbread called chapati (phulka in Punjab region).
- Paneer (freshly made cottage cheese) Recipes like shahi paneer, khoya paneer, paneer kofta (paneer chunks battered and fried, then simmered in a spicy gravy), Amritsari paneer, matar paneer (paneer with green peas), paneer paratha (wheat flatbread stuffed with paneer), palak paneer
- Panjiri: This is a traditional North Indian dessert and is popular in Punjab region as well. which has a generous amount of almonds, walnuts, pistachios, dry dates, cashew nuts along with whole wheat flour, sugar, edible gum, poppy seeds and fennel seeds to make the traditional dish of 'panjri' or also known as 'dabra'.
- Churri: It is made in different flavours salty and sweety but most famous type is mixing crushed wheat chapati, sugar and real cow ghee.
- Legumes: a variety of legumes are used, including chickpeas, pigeon peas, red lentils, mung bean, red kidney beans (originally an import from the Americas) and black gram. Legumes may be used singly or in combination like Dal Makhani
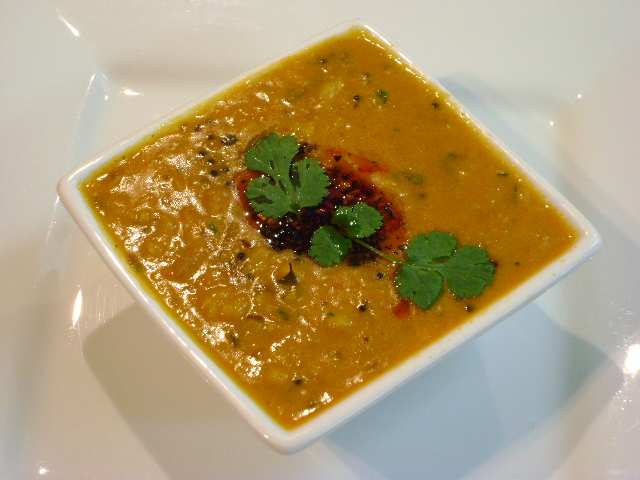
  Tarka daal ambarsari
- Saag: a variety of leafy greens (including spinach and mustard greens), typically cooked down to a stew, tempered with ginger, tomato, onion, garlic, chilies and other spices, and often enriched with paneer or cream. Bathua is also added to enhance the flavor. It is served with butter on top and with makki ki roti. Saag is a winter and spring delicacy; it is one of the most popular dishes of Punjab.
- Eggplant: Baingan bharta the eggplant is prepared by roasting and peeling the skin off, but much richer, with the incorporation of much cooked tomato, browned onion and a variety of spices instead of tahini.
- Punj Ratani Dal: A thick gravy that uses 5 legumes, with tomato, browned onion and spices.
- Punjabi kadhi pakora (traditional curry with rice). Kadhi is a type of curry made with yogurt or buttermilk, which is thickened with chickpea flour and seasoned with ginger, turmeric, chilies, and tempered spices. Deep-fried lumps of spiced chickpea-flour batter (pakoras) are also added.
- Punjabi lassi paneer: In the Punjab, it is traditional to prepare lassi and then extract the paneer which would then be consumed by adding water, salt and chili. Lassi paneer can also be added to potatoes and spices to make a curry which resembles scrambled eggs. Lassi paneer cannot be cut into cubes as paneer from milk can be.

=== Snacks ===
- Toasted grains: In Punjab, toasting corn and wheat grains on the Punjabi bhathi is a traditional snack preparation.
- Samosas
- Golgappa

=== Raita and chutney ===
Along with all types of main dishes raita or chutney is also served.

== Sweets and desserts ==
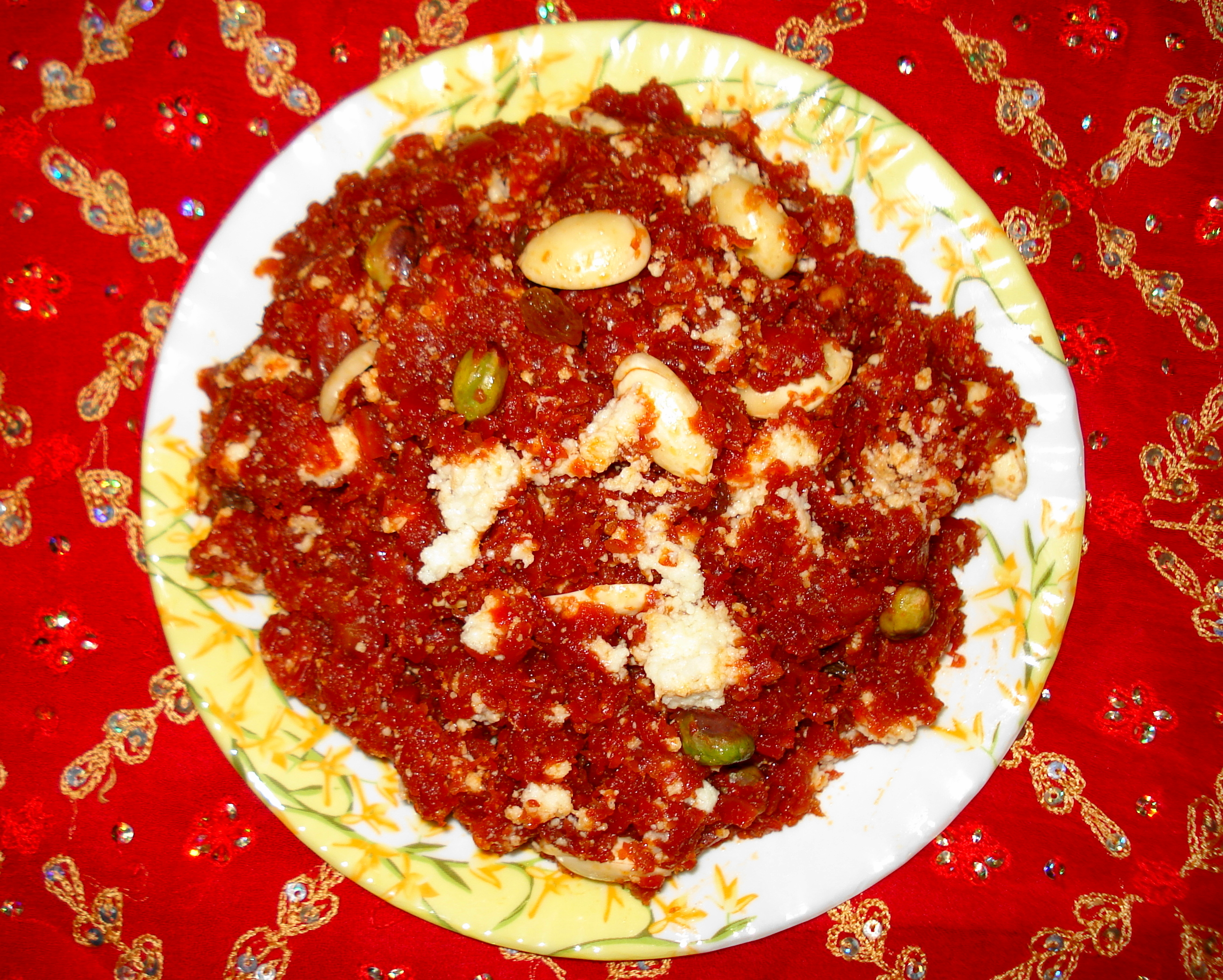
Gajar da halwa (Gajrela), a dessert made from carrot

Punjabi cuisine includes various types of desserts and Mithyai which include:

- Amritsari
- Kheer, dessert made of rice, milk and dry fruits
- Khoya
- Kulfi, an ice-cream-like dessert
- Malpua
- Rabri
- Semolina-based desserts: Halva
- Sheer korma
- Kaju katli
- Atte ka halwa (Kadah)
- Pude – usually made during the rainy season
- Pinni – Made with desi ghee, wheat flour, almond and jaggery
- Gulab jamun
- Jalebi
- Burfi.
- Gajrela

Suwaiah-a sweet milk based desert with a special type of pasta

== Bread ==
Punjabis eat a variety of breads. Flatbreads and raised breads are eaten on a daily basis. Raised breads are known as khamiri roti. Sunflower and flax seeds are also added in some breads occasionally. The breads may be made of different types of flour and can be made in various ways:

- Baked in the tandoor like naan, tandoori roti, kulcha, or lachha paratha
- Dry baked (Indian griddle), jowar di roti, baajre di roti and makki di roti (these are also smeared with white butter)
- Shallow fried like paratha
- Deep fried like puri, Kachori and bhatoora (a fermented dough)
- Salt-rising bread: Salt-rising bread is a unique bread found only in the Salt Range region of Punjab, Pakistan. Since rock salt is readily available in the salt range, many people in the past made use of salt instead of yeast to leaven the bread.
- Papar
- Taftan: an Iranian bread popular in Pakistan and Lahore. It can be eaten with korma and nihari.

== Herbs and spices ==
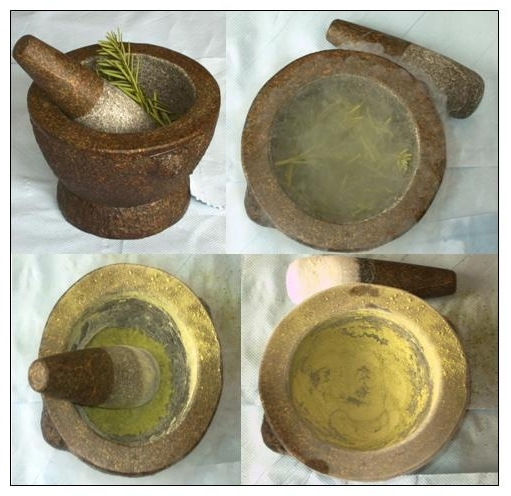
Mortar and pestle (Old method to mix spices)

Indian subcontinent-based spices are used in Punjabi cuisine, which are ground in a mortar and pestle or a food processor.

== Beverages ==
Punjab has a diverse range of beverages. Some are dairy-based such as lassi and buttermilk. Water buffalo milk-based products are especially common around Punjab. Examples are mango lassi, mango milkshake, and chaas. Others are juices derived from vegetables and fruits, such as watermelon shakes, carrot juice and tamarind juice (imli ka paani). Shikanjvi and neembu paani drinks are especially preferred during the summer. Jal-jeera is also common as well.

Sattu is a traditional North Indian drink that is also traditionally consumed in the Punjab. Sattu is made by roasting barley grains and then grinding them into powder, mixed with salt and turmeric and water.

The local regional drinks in Punjab also include Doodh soda (milk soda), Desi Daaru (a local form of alcohol in India) and Bantay (a local soda drink) in Pakistan.

== Fermented foods ==
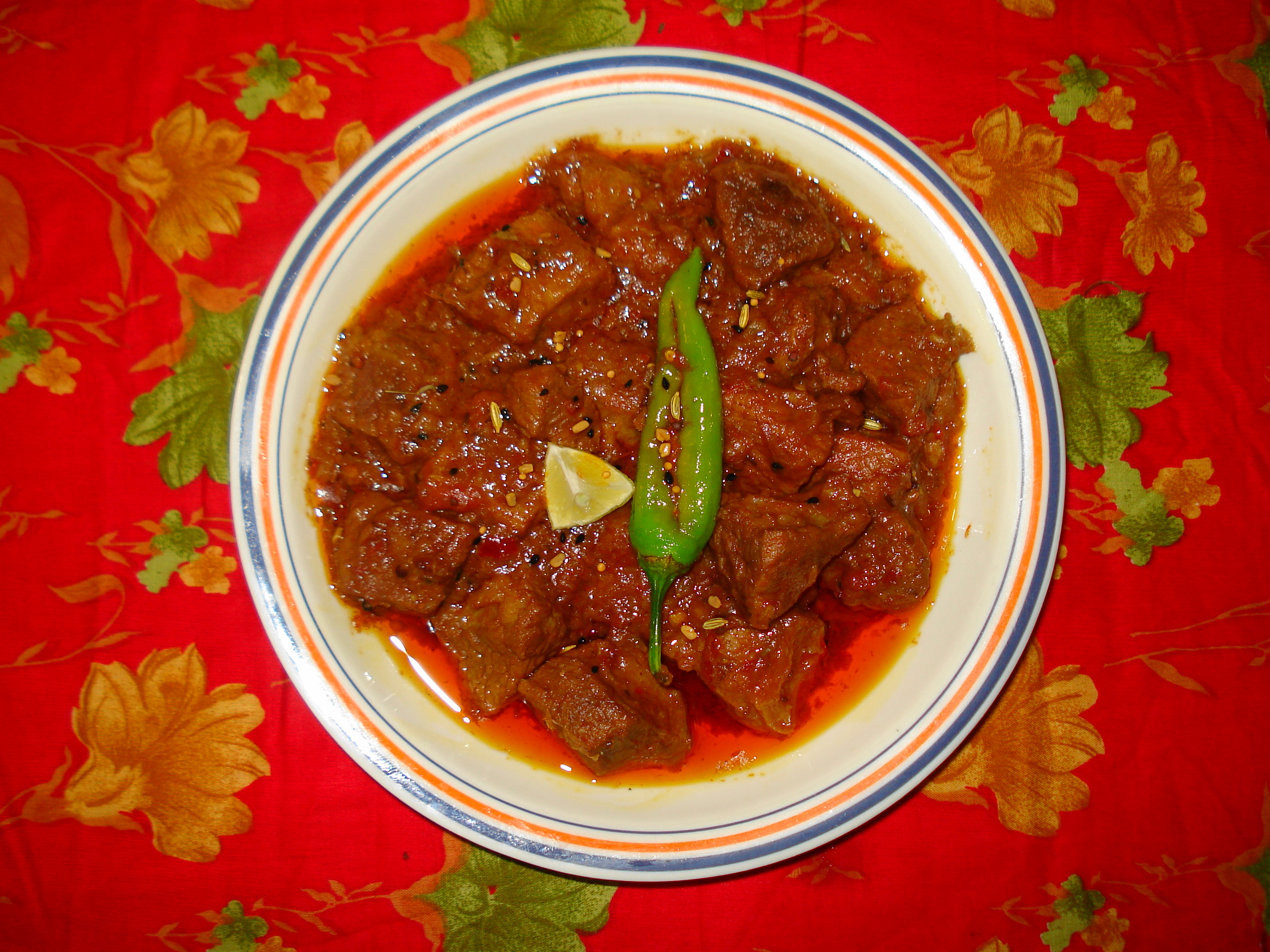
Achar gosht, a famous dish made from chicken and pickles mixture

Fermented foods are common in Punjabi cuisine. Also fermented foods are added in the preparation of some dishes as well. Mango pickle is especially famous in many villages of Punjab.

== Cooking methods ==
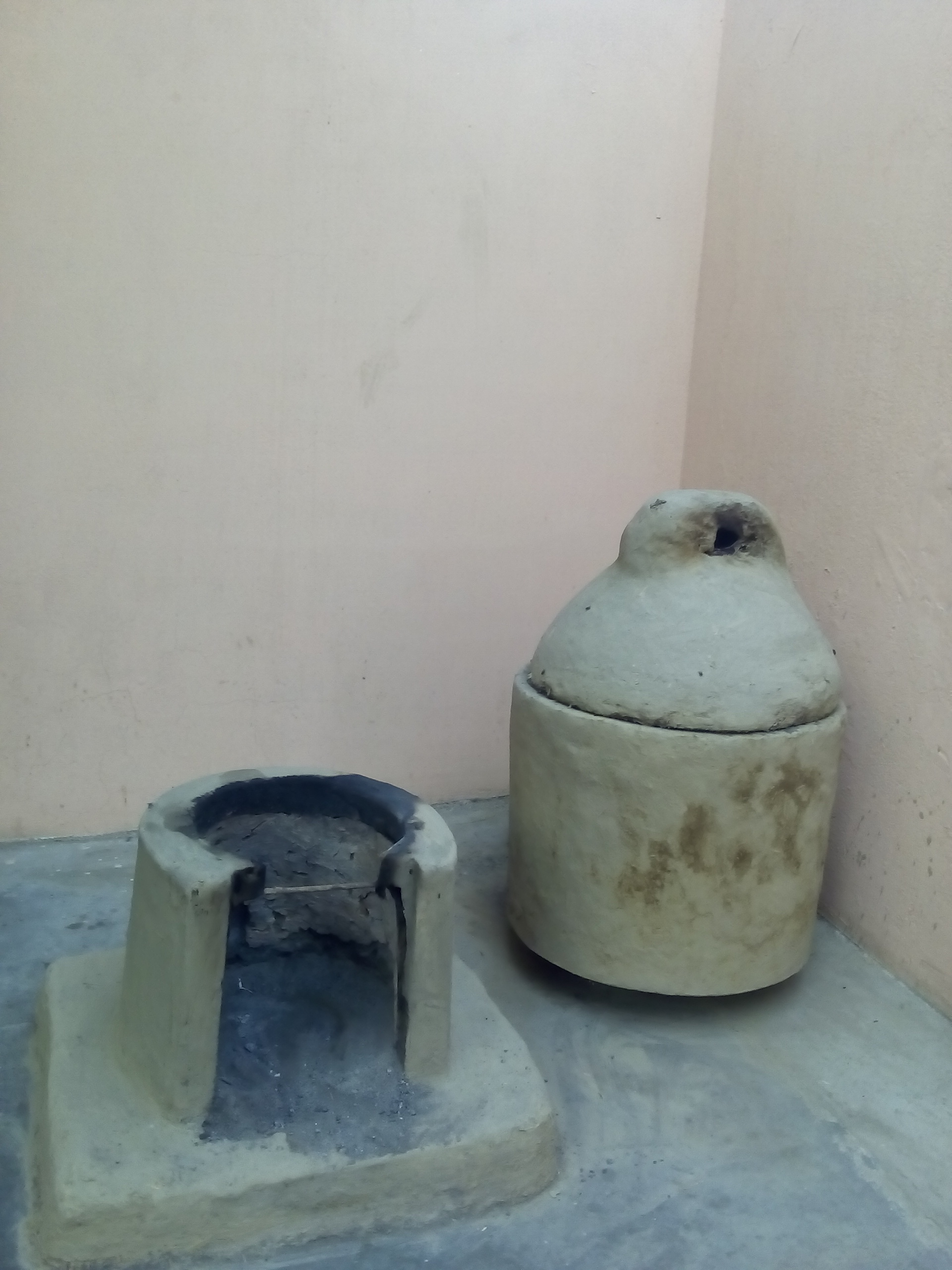
A traditional Punjabi stove (Chulla) and oven (Bharolli)

Traditional and modern methods are employed for cooking Punjabi cuisine. The traditional stoves and ovens used to cook Punjabi food include:

=== Chullah ===
The traditional name of the stove in the Punjabi language is chulla. Traditional houses also have ovens (wadda chulla or band chulla) that are made from bricks, stones, and in many cases clay. Older communities in Punjab also used earth ovens (khadda chulla), but this tradition is dying out now.

=== Bhathi ===
A masonry oven is known as a bhathi. Outdoor cooking and grilling have many different types of bhathi. A bhathi is used to roast wheat or corn for which Kalsi (1992) describes as a "special oven with an open pan in which sand is heated to roast corn."

=== Hara ===
A hara is a six-foot-tall oven with its own roof. The hara is traditionally used to slow-heat milk or slow-cook pulses such as chickpeas.

=== Tandoor ===
According to Ancient Pakistan - An Archaeological History by Mukhtar Ahmed, Harappan oven structures may have operated in a similar manner to the modern tandoors of the Punjab. The tandoor is traditionally made of clay and is a bell-shaped oven, set into the earth and fired with wood or charcoal reaching high temperatures. According to Roy Hayter the original versions of the tandoor "in the Punjab, a province in the north-west of India, were sunk neck deep in the ground". He further states that modern versions can also rest above the ground.

=== Modern methods ===
- Pressure cookers
- Iron griddle

== Etiquette of Punjabi dining ==
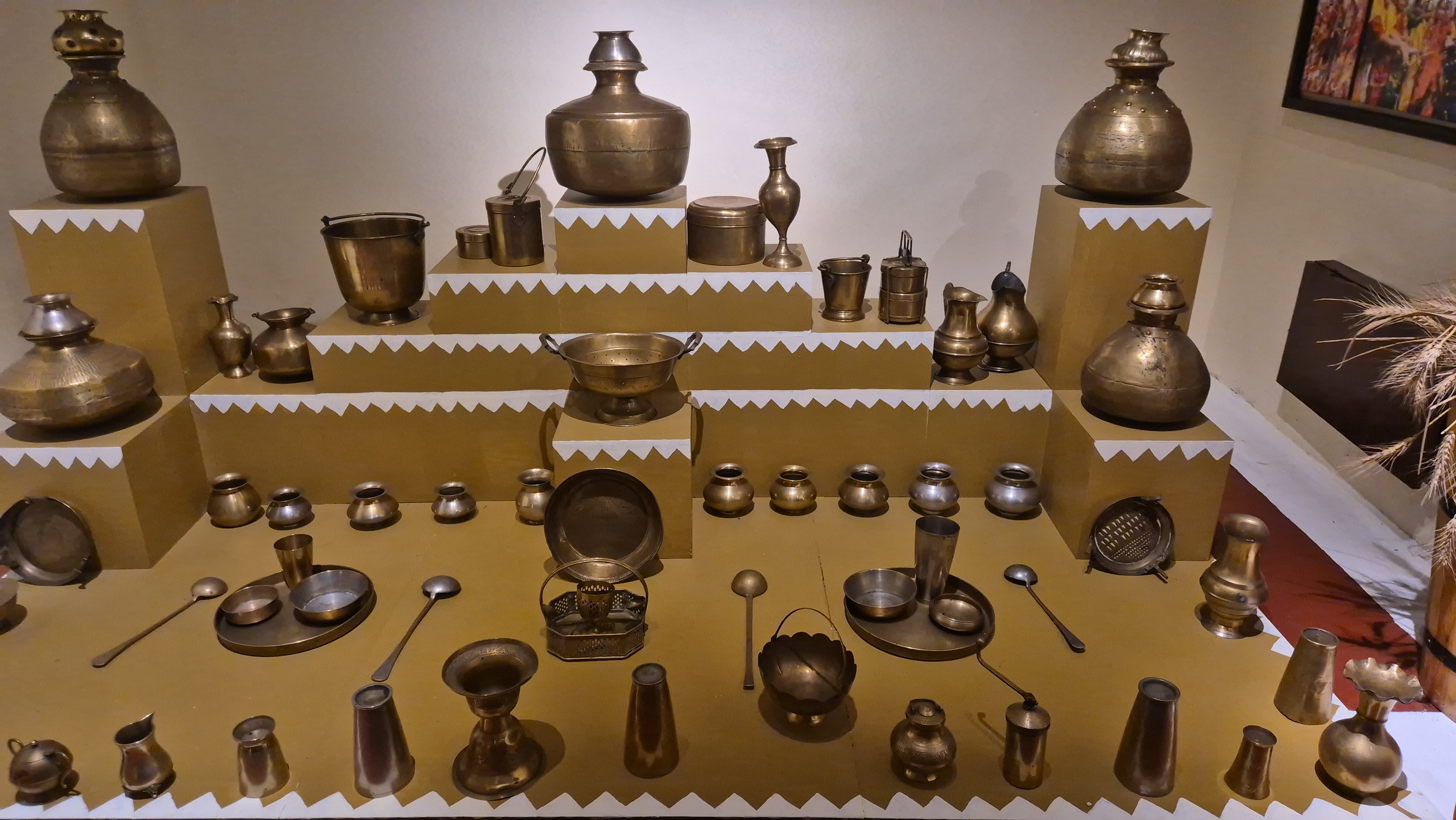
A display from Mera Pind, Punjab showcasing Rasoi de Bhande, traditional kitchen utensils of Punjab mostly made of brass

Etiquette of eating is considered a major part of the cuisine. Every Punjabi household follows certain regional etiquette. The word etiquette has many local names depending on the particular region of Punjab. Though certain etiquette varies regionally, there are many etiquette practices that are common throughout Punjab. Communal dining is a norm in Punjabi families.

Bringing and sending fresh fruits, sweets and food items as gifts to family members is a common practice in Punjab, particularly during the spring season. Food items are distributed among neighbors as well on special occasions and as a sign to show hospitality. Mango is considered a delicacy and produced widely in Punjab, and mango parties are common during the fruit's harvest season. Watermelon and radish at food stalls are shared among friends and relatives.

=== Major features of etiquette ===
An invitation to a meal or tea is typically distributed a few days beforehand. Denying the invitation for no major reason is considered a breach of etiquette.

Table setting is done before the arrival of the guests.

Family members or any occupants within one home make sure to eat together during the dinner. If any other person is present in the vicinity, then they are offered meals as a way of giving respect. It is considered rude to start eating food without asking others to participate in a meal. It is customary to offer food to anyone in your vicinity before eating. The invited guest or elder person is given special respect and attention. Usually the invited guest is requested to start the meal. It is considered rude if the host starts eating without taking into account the attendance of all guests.

Punjabi families use a hybrid style of South Asian and European utensil etiquette most of the time. The bread is eaten with the hands, and rice with a spoon. Desserts are eaten with spoons. Soup spoons are used for consuming soup and forks are used for eating noodles. Chewing food with one's mouth open and burping in front of others is considered rude. In the villages of Punjab, an additional common plate is usually placed on the table for any bones left from the consumption of bone meat. Placing leftovers on the floor or on the table floor is considered bad etiquette.

== Punjabi dhaba ==
The roadsides often serve as suburban eatery centers. They can also be a communal place to sit and chat. Some serve on the same concept of the greasy spoon.

== Punjabi restaurants ==
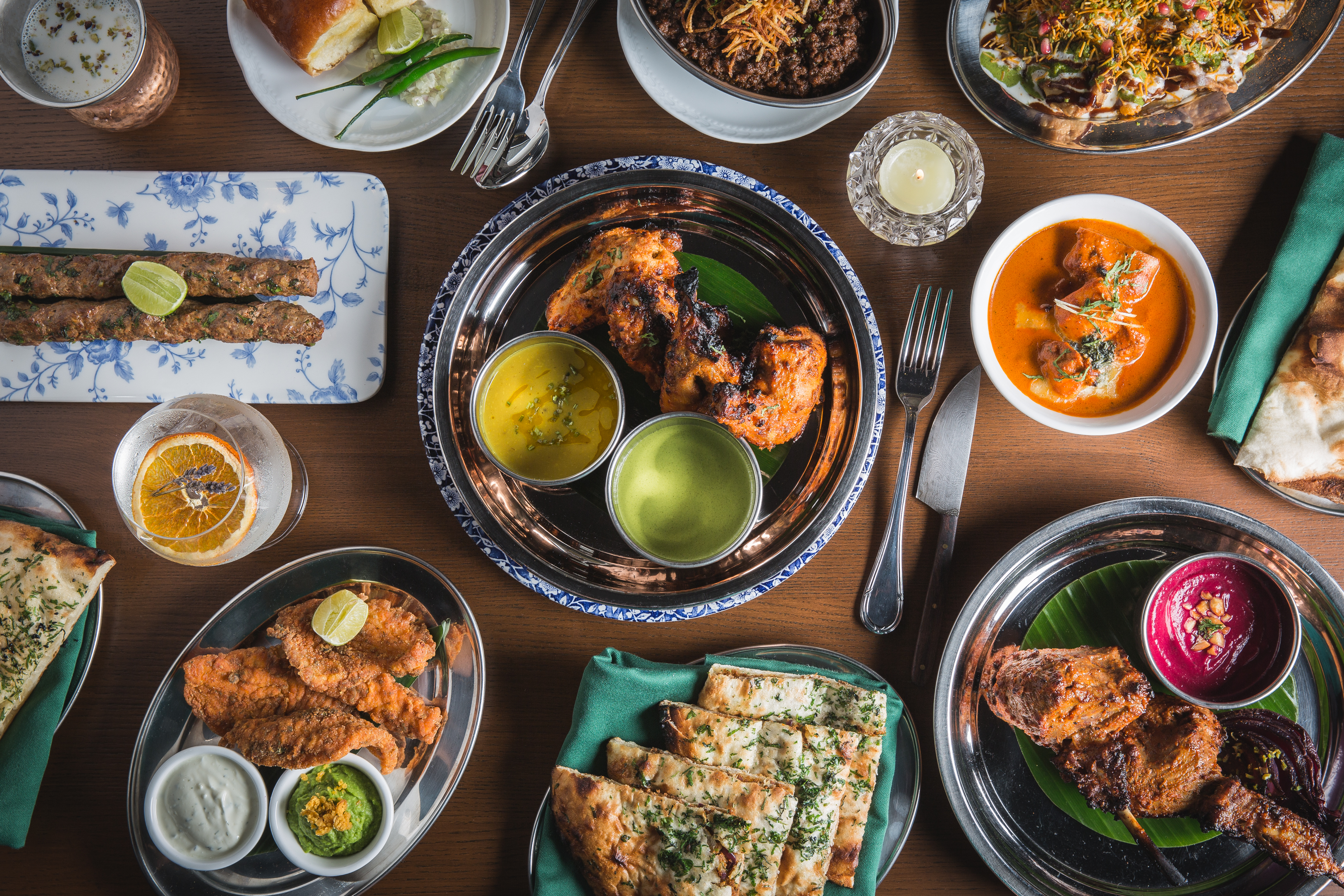
Selection of signature dishes at New Punjab Club

Punjabi cuisine has spread internationally. Punjab in London has been family-run since 1946 and is the UK's oldest North Indian restaurant. The New Punjab Club, located in Hong Kong, became the world's first Punjabi restaurant to earn one Michelin star in 2019. Chawla's Cuisine, known for its cream chicken recipe, was founded by S. Attar Singh Chawla in 1960. The chain has expanded outside India to countries like Canada and the United Arab Emirates with over 170 franchises.

== See also ==
- Indian cuisine
- Lahori cuisine
- Pakistani cuisine
