= Chana masala =

Chickpea dish from the Indian subcontinent

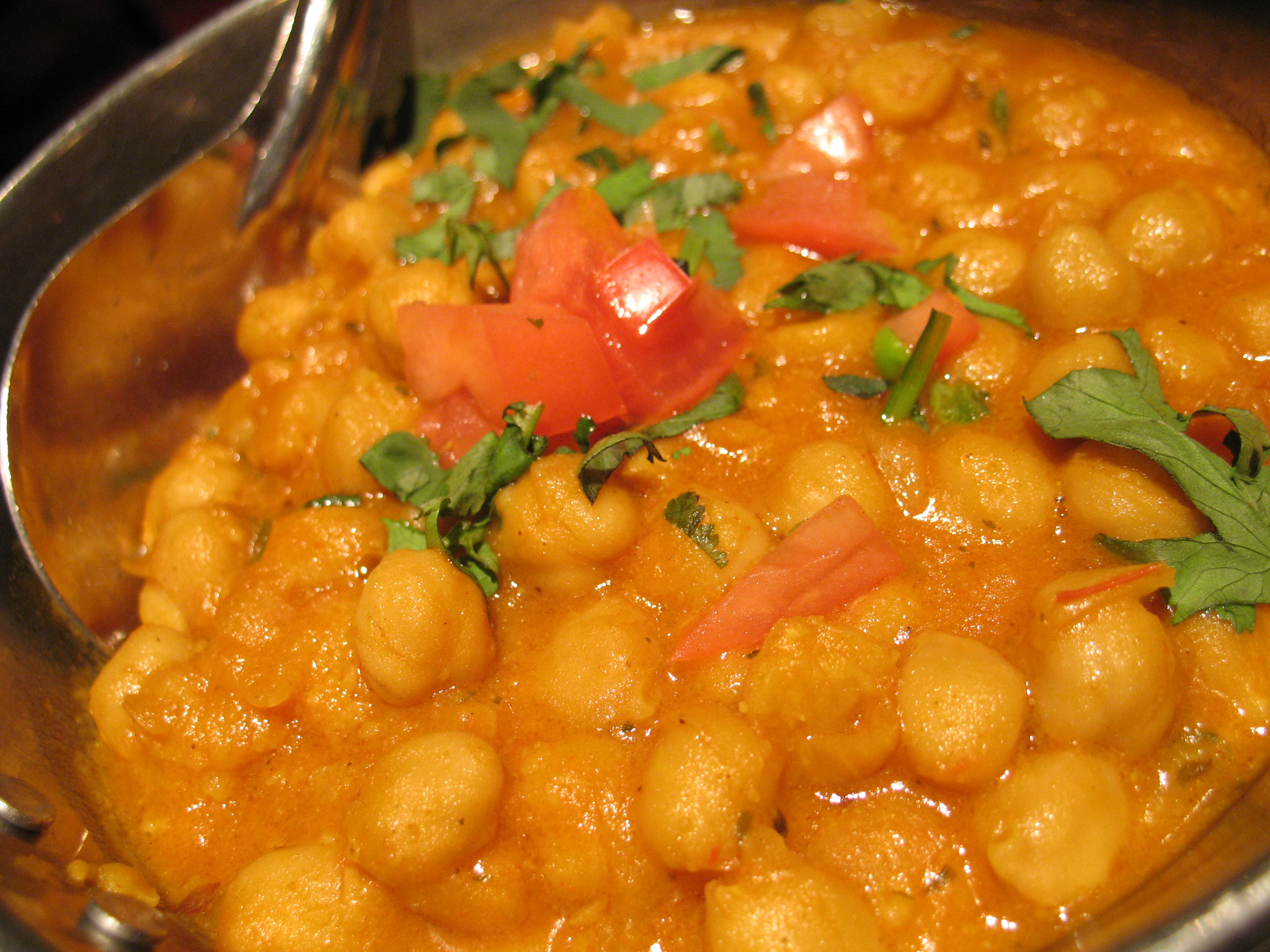
- Place of origin: Indian subcontinent
- Region or state: North India
- Main ingredients: Chickpeas, onion, tomatoes, coriander, garlic, chiles, ginger, oil, spices

Chana masala (also chole masala or chholay) is a chickpea curry cooked in a tomato-based sauce, originating from the Indian subcontinent. It is a staple dish in Indian (particularly North Indian) and Pakistani cuisine. It is often eaten with bread, including deep-fried bhatura (where the combination is called chole bhature), puri, or flatbreads such as kulcha.

== Ingredients and preparation ==
Along with chickpeas, the ingredients of chana masala typically include a base of onions, garlic, ginger, and chili peppers; chopped tomatoes to form the tomato sauce; and herbs and spices, such as amchoor, coriander, cumin, garam masala, and turmeric.

To prepare chana masala, raw chickpeas are soaked overnight in water. They are then drained, rinsed, and cooked with onions, tomatoes, and spices.

It is sometimes garnished with cilantro and lemon or lime wedges.

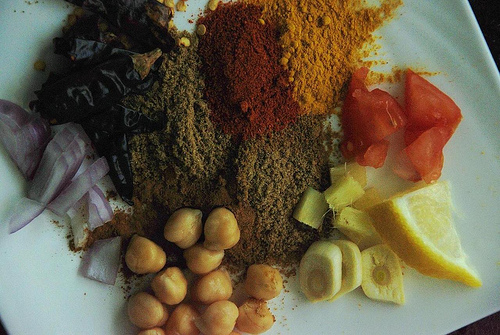
Raw ingredients of chana masala

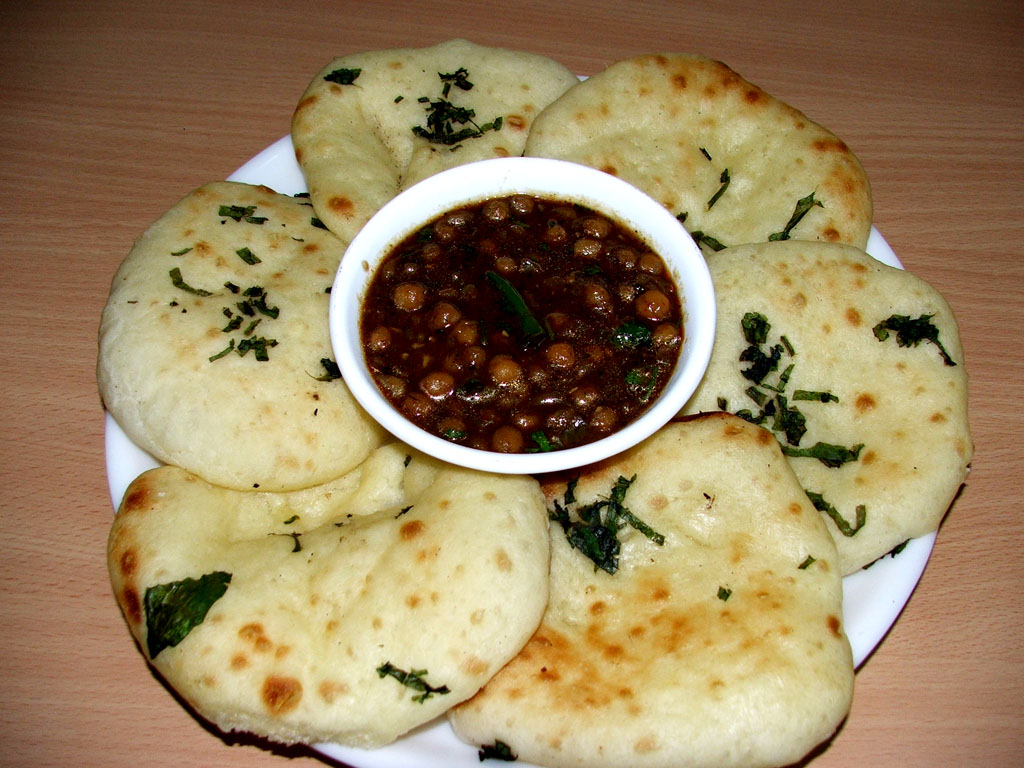
Chole kulcha (chana masala with flatbread)
