= Pinni =

Punjabi dessert eaten mostly in winter

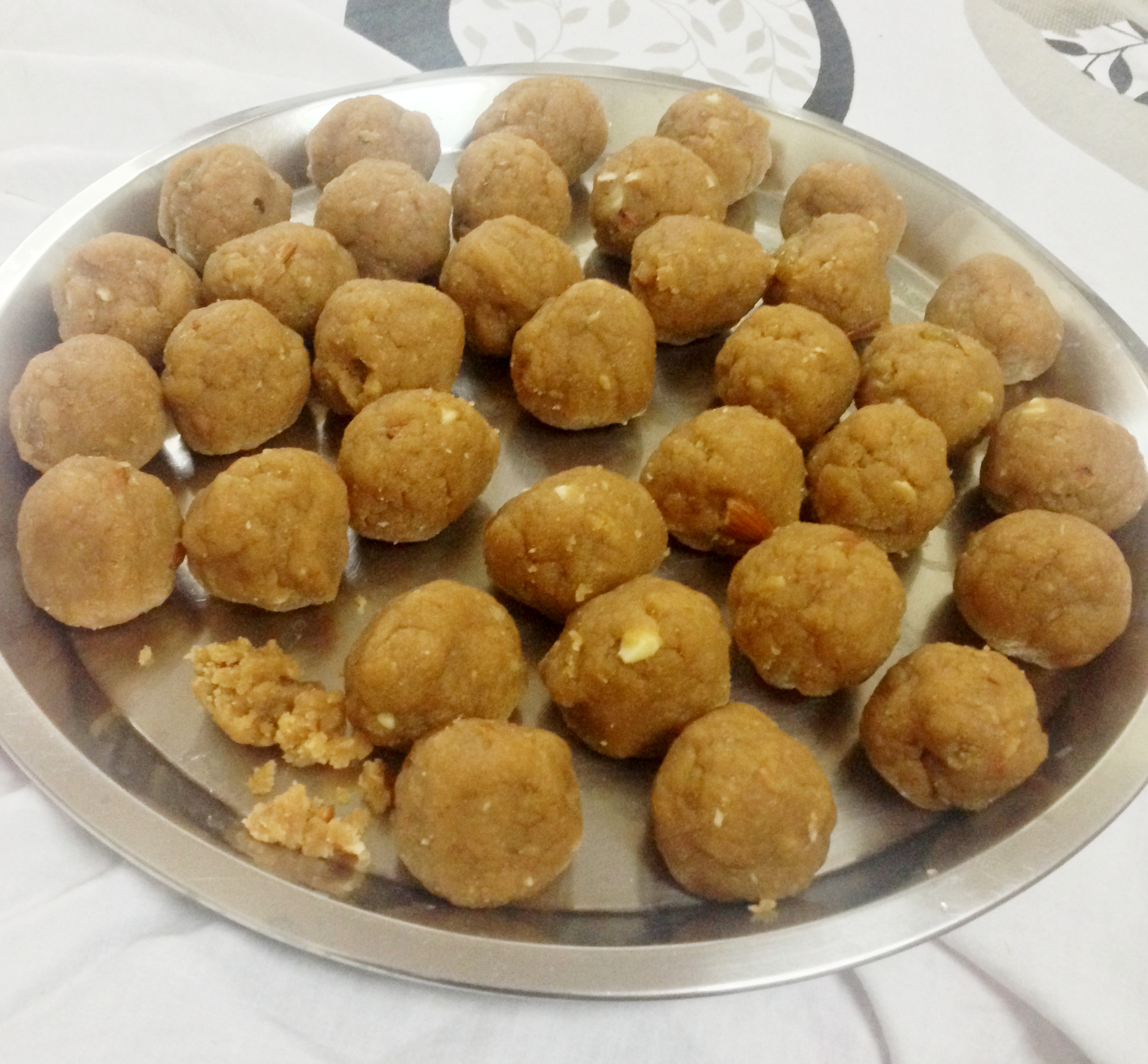
Pinni made with atta (wheat flour), khoya (thickened milk) and dry fruits

Pinni is a type of Punjabi cuisine dish that is eaten mostly in winters. It is served as a dessert and is made from desi ghee, wheat flour, jaggery and almonds. Raisins may also be used. Urad dal pinni is a variety of pinni."Alsi pinni, from Punjab contains flaxseed.

Pinni is also a general term for desserts or sweets prepared in a round shape.

== Ingredients ==
For added flavor, khoya is used in the pinnis. Pinni is a joint sweet dish in North India and the Punjab region, also called pindi. Pinnis do not go bad for a lengthy time and do not require to be refrigerated. Pinnis are covered with crushed cardamom and preferably served warm with tea or warm dairy.

== See also ==
- List of desserts
