= Indian cuisine =

Culinary traditions

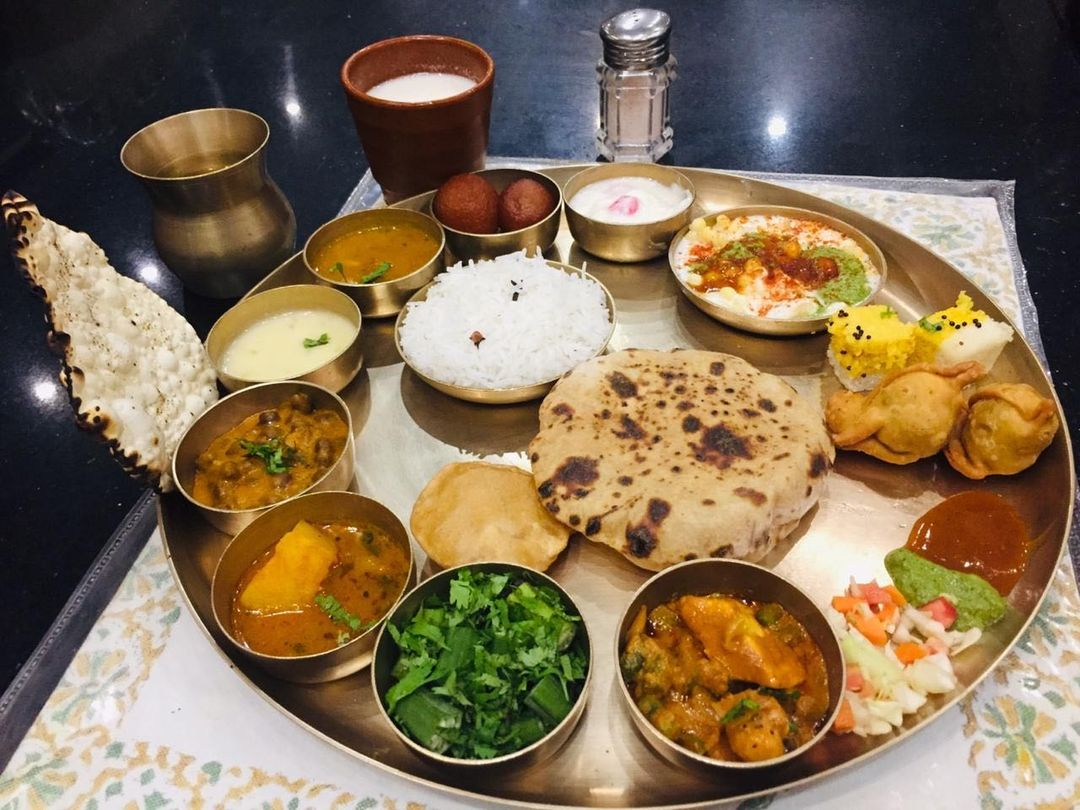
A traditional Indian thali meal served in a metal tray with small dishes for sauces, accompanied by rice, roti and puri

Indian cuisine is not a single homogeneous entity, but consists of the regional cuisines native to the Indian subcontinent. Indian food has been influenced by religion, cultural choices and traditions.

Agriculture spread to the Indus Valley Civilisation around 7000 BCE, bringing cereal cultivation. Spices such as turmeric and cardamom were being grown in India by 3,000 BCE. Indian cooking uses simple equipment such as a burner, and labour-intensive processes such as grinding flavourings by hand. Techniques unique to the area include frying of a paste of onion, garlic, and ginger in oil, then browning the meat or vegetables in that oil, and then adding liquid stepwise; and adding fried spices to cooked dishes. Many dishes are specific to India's many religious festivals. Religious faiths influence the region's cuisines, since Hindus often do not eat beef; Muslims avoid pork; and Jains are strict lacto-vegetarians.

== History ==
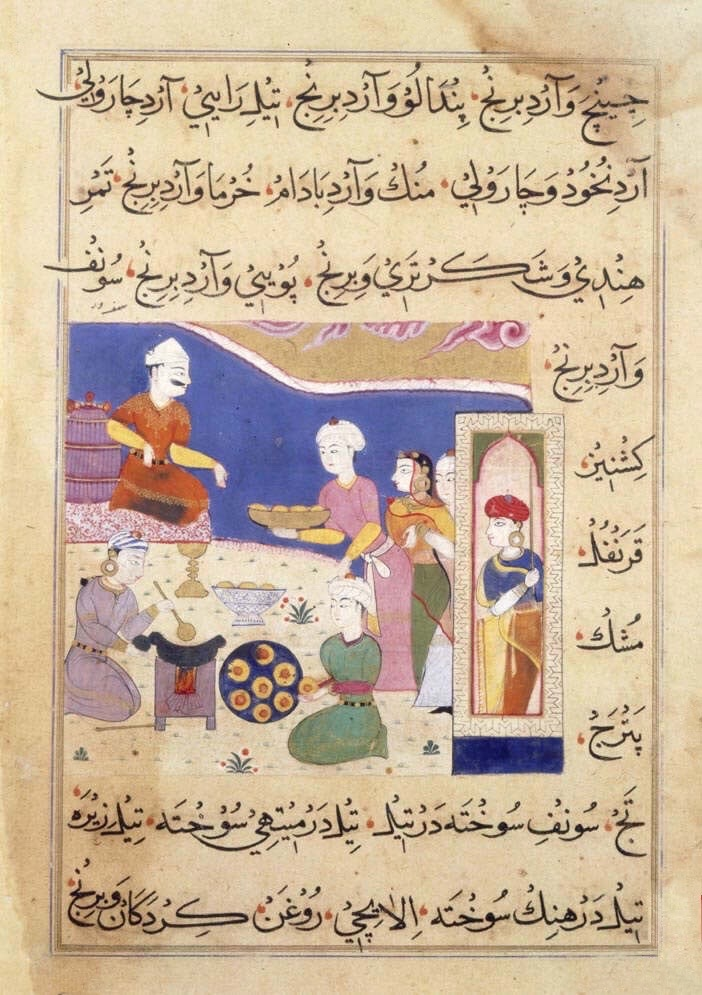
Serving samosas in the c. 16th century Ni'matnāmah Naṣir al-Dīn Shāhī

Indian cuisine reflects an 8,000-year history of groups and cultures interacting with the Indian subcontinent, creating the diversity of flavours and regional cuisines found in modern-day India. After 9000 BCE, a first period of indirect prehistoric contacts between the Fertile Crescent and the Indus Valley seems to have occurred as a consequence of the Neolithic Revolution and the diffusion of agriculture. Around 7000 BCE, agriculture spread from the Fertile Crescent to the Indus Valley, and wheat and barley began to be grown. Sesame and humped cattle were domesticated in the local farming communities. Mehrgarh is one of the earliest sites with evidence of farming and herding in South Asia. By 3000 BCE, turmeric, cardamom, black pepper and mustard were harvested in India. From around 2350 BCE, evidence for imports from the Indus to Ur in Mesopotamia appears, while cloves from the Moluccas were found in Terqa. Akkadian Empire records mention timber, carnelian and ivory imported from Meluhha, meaning the Indus Valley Civilisation.

The Mahabharata mentions rice and vegetable cooked together, and the word "pulao" is used to refer to the dish in works such as Yājñavalkya Smṛti. Filipino cuisine was influenced by Indian cuisine.

Later, arrivals from Arabia, Central Asia, and centuries of trade relations and cultural exchange resulted in a significant influence on each region's cuisines, such as the adoption of the tandoor in the Middle East from northwestern India.

A major influence was the rule of the Mughal dynasty in India. Mughlai cuisine combined Persian and Hindu cooking, resulting in a range of characteristic dishes such as pilau, biryani, and kebabs. The Portuguese and British during their rule introduced techniques such as baking, and foods from the New World and Europe. New-world vegetables include tomato, potato, sweet potato, peanut, squash, and chilli. The British introduced cauliflower in 1822. Around the end of the 18th century, the Scotsman Robert Lindsay mentions a Sylheti man cooking a curry for his family.

== Common approaches ==
=== Ingredients ===
Staple foods of Indian cuisine include pearl millet (bājra), rice, whole-wheat flour (aṭṭa), and a variety of lentils, such as masoor (most often red lentils), tuer (pigeon peas), urad (black gram), and moong (mung beans). Lentils may be used whole, dehusked—for example, dhuli moong or dhuli urad—or split. Split lentils, or dal, are used extensively.

Many Indian dishes are cooked in vegetable oil, but peanut oil is popular in northern and western India, mustard oil in eastern India, and coconut oil in southern India. Gingelly (sesame) oil is common in the south since it imparts a fragrant, nutty aroma. sunflower, safflower, cottonseed, and soybean oils have become popular across India in the 21st century. Hydrogenated vegetable oil, known as Vanaspati ghee, is another popular cooking medium.

The most important and frequently used spices and flavourings in Indian cuisine are whole or powdered chilli pepper (mirch, introduced by the Portuguese from Mexico in the 16th century), black mustard seed (sarso), cardamom (elaichi), cumin (jeera), turmeric (haldi), asafoetida (hing), ginger (adrak), coriander (dhania), and garlic (lasoon). Panch phoron is popular in eastern India. Goda masala is a sweet spice mix popular in Maharashtra. Leaves commonly used for flavouring include bay leaves (tejpat), coriander leaves, fenugreek (methi) leaves, and mint leaves. The use of curry leaves and roots for flavouring is typical of Gujarati and South Indian cuisine.

Common ingredients

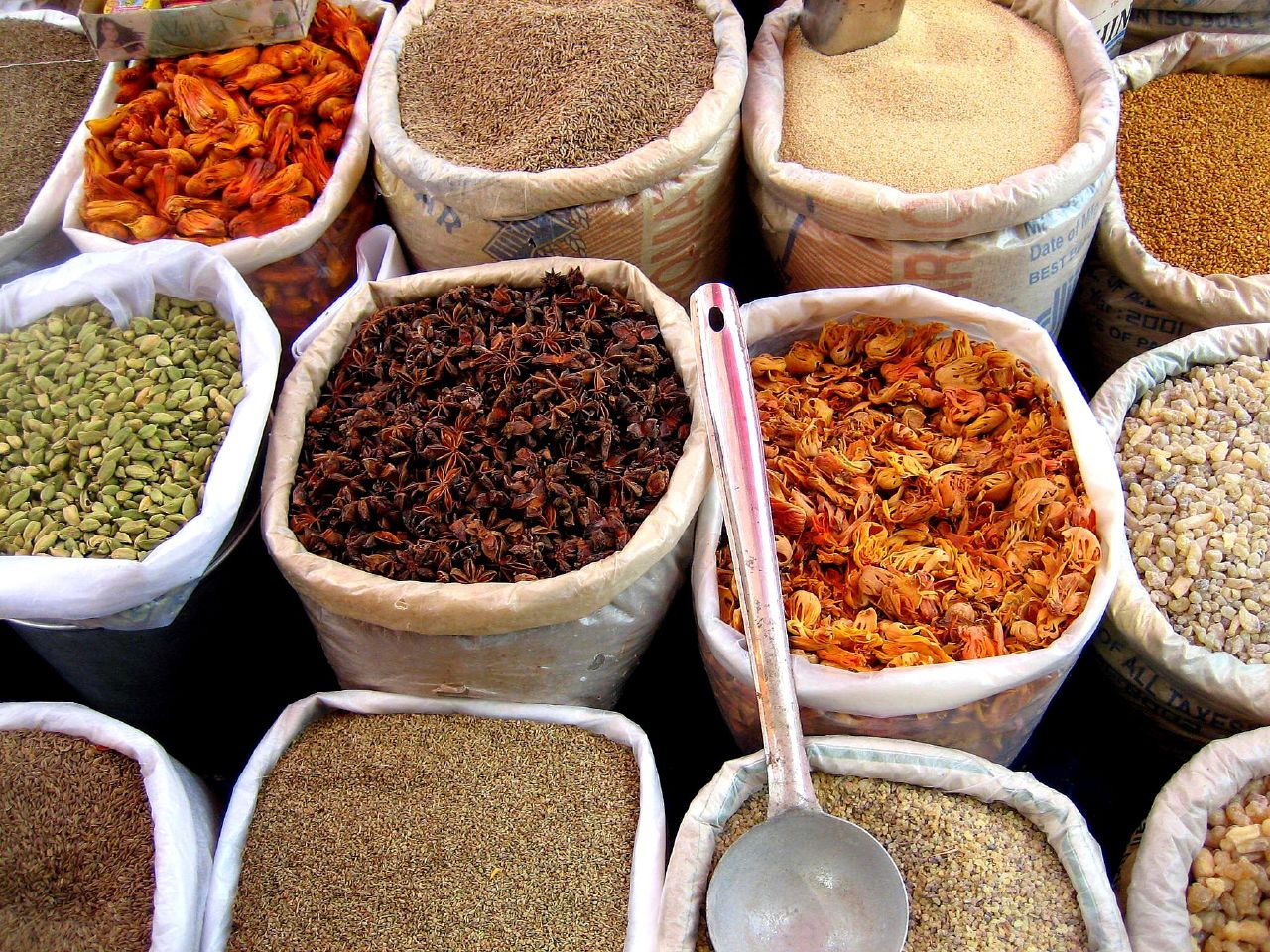
Spices at a grocery store in India

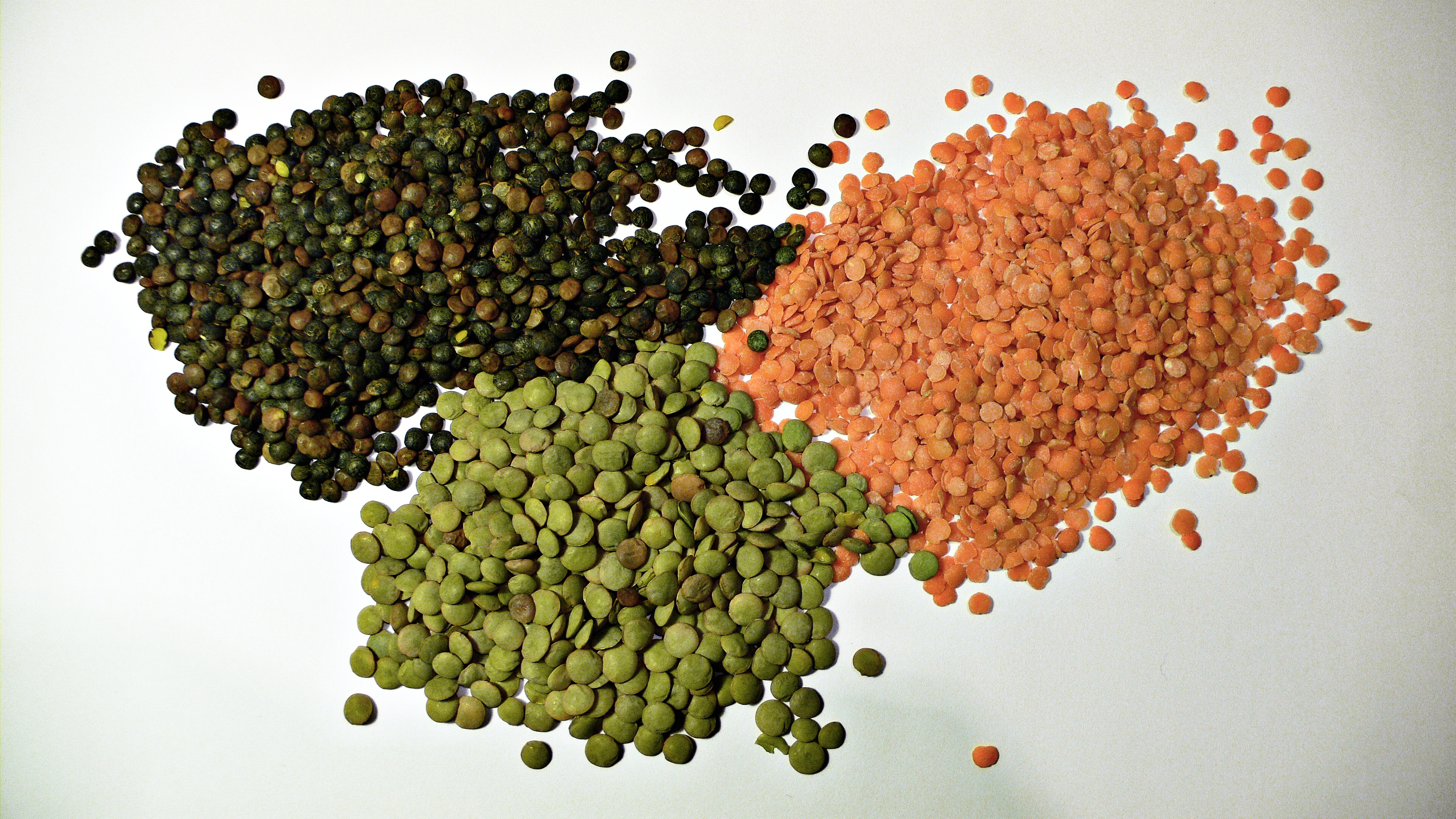
Lentils are a staple ingredient in Indian cuisine.

=== Cooking techniques ===
Indian cooking uses simple equipment, but is extremely labour-intensive. Food is cooked over a burner, whether gas or using a traditional fuel such as charcoal or dried cowpats. Pressure cookers are widely used to cook the food more quickly. Two techniques are unique to the region. In one, a paste is made from onion, garlic, ginger and oil, and fried until soft; then the meat or vegetables are browned in that oil; and finally, liquid is added stepwise, stirring all the time, giving a result that in Colleen Taylor Sen's view merges sauteing, stir-frying, and stewing. In the other technique, named variously bagar, chhauk, or takar, spices are fried in ghee or oil, and added to a cooked dish of dal or curry.

Dishes are often accompanied by pickles, made by soaking food such as meat, vegetables, or fruit in vinegar or in concentrated salt water. The equipment used for cooking is often limited, from traditional earthenware pots to modern cast iron or stainless steel vessels such as the two-handled karahi. Herbs, spices and garlic are often crushed with a stone rolling pin or with a pestle and mortar.

Cooking techniques

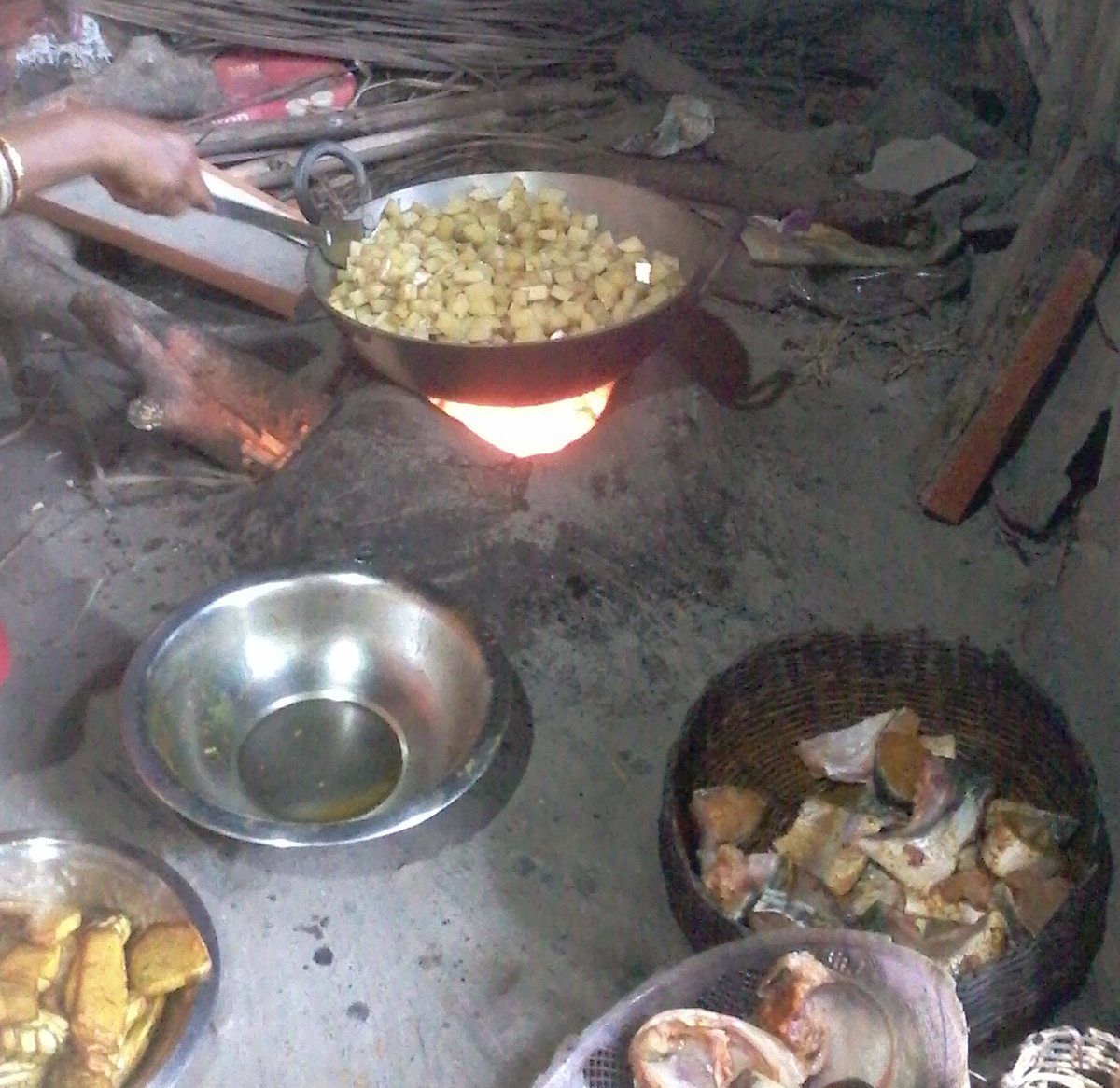
Cooking with a two-handled pot over a wood-fired stove

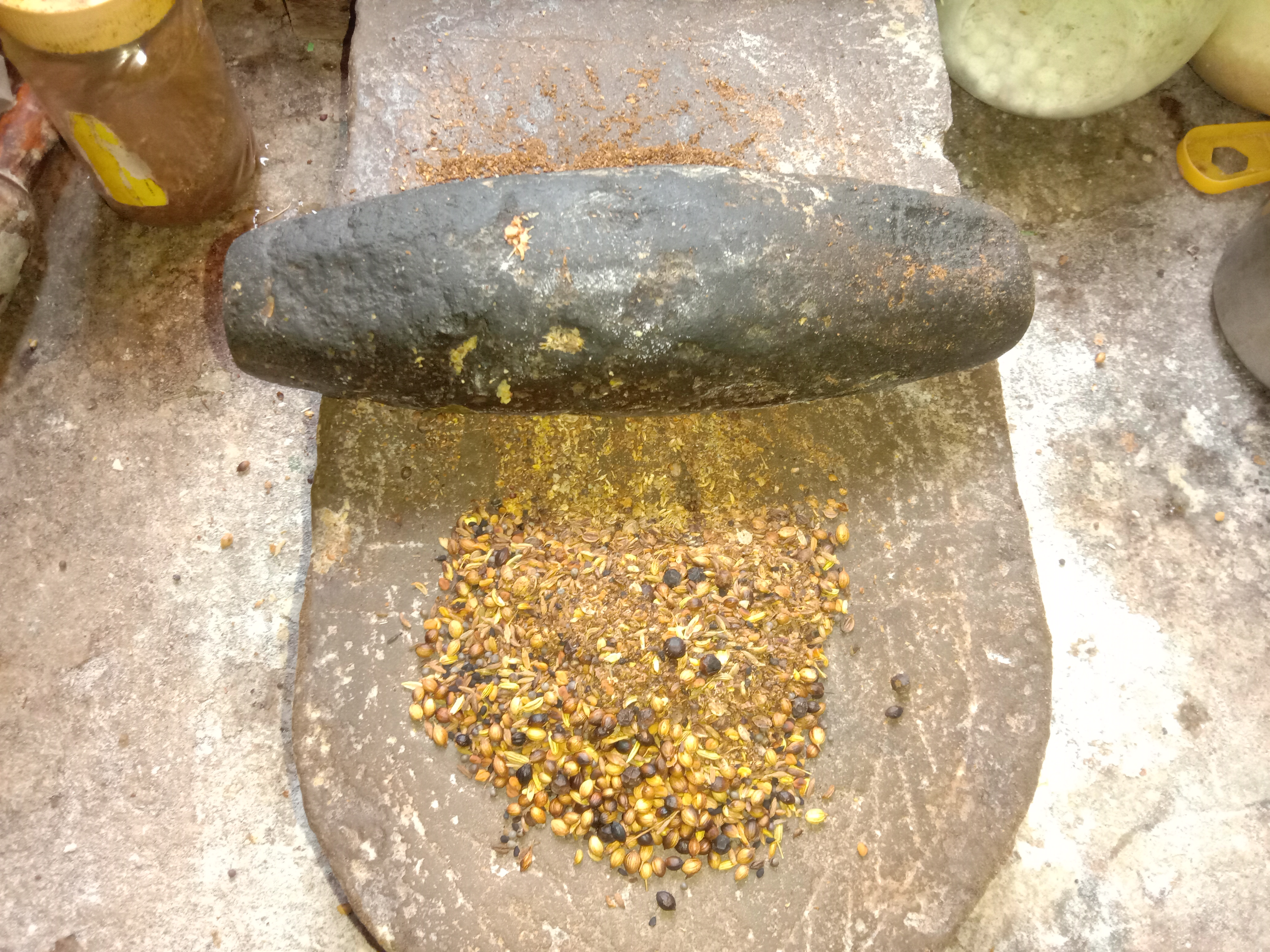
Grinding spices with a stone rolling pin

== National and regional cuisines ==
Cuisine differs across India's regions and states. The cook Madhur Jaffrey writes that India, larger than Europe (excluding Russia), has cuisines in its states as diverse as those of European countries, while the climates which govern what foods can be grown range from the coconut palm-rich tropical south to the mountains of the Himalayas in the North. Alan Davidson states that there is, all the same, an underlying unity in Indian cuisine, since meals are based on cereal (rice or wheat) accompanied by savoury dishes often containing pulses and vegetables, and carefully applied spices "especially ginger and garlic". Another distinctive feature is India's widespread vegetarianism. Davidson notes that international perception of Indian cuisine is clouded by the fact that Indian restaurants, both in India and abroad, are often operated by Punjabis and people from Bangladesh. Punjabis have for instance helped to make tandoori dishes popular.

=== Street food ===
Indian street food varies by region, with specialties particular to the street food of Chennai, of Old Delhi, and of Mumbai among others. Muslim influence in Delhi has resulted in meat snacks such as kebabs, while Kolkata has kati rolls with chicken and egg. Vada pav, a potato dumpling inside a bun, is a characteristic street snack in Mumbai, while idli and sambar is popular in Chennai.

Street food

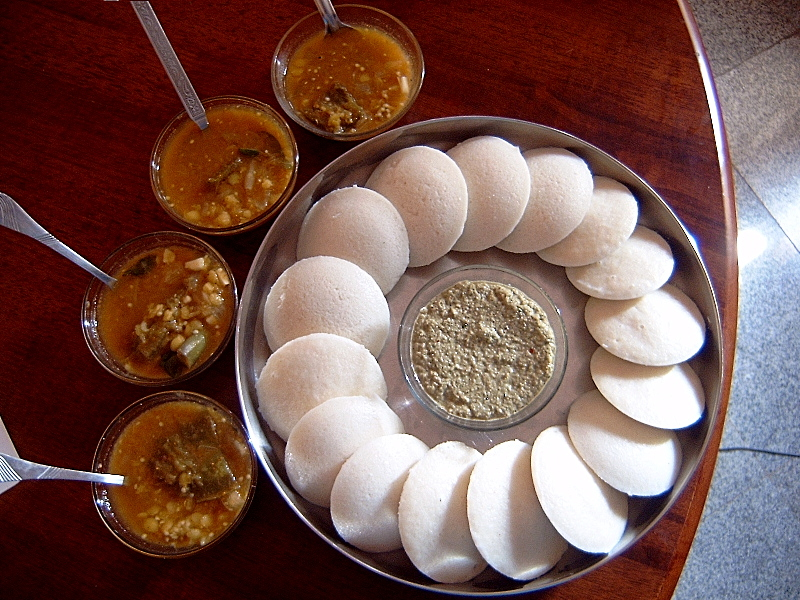
Idli and sambar, a common dish in Chennai

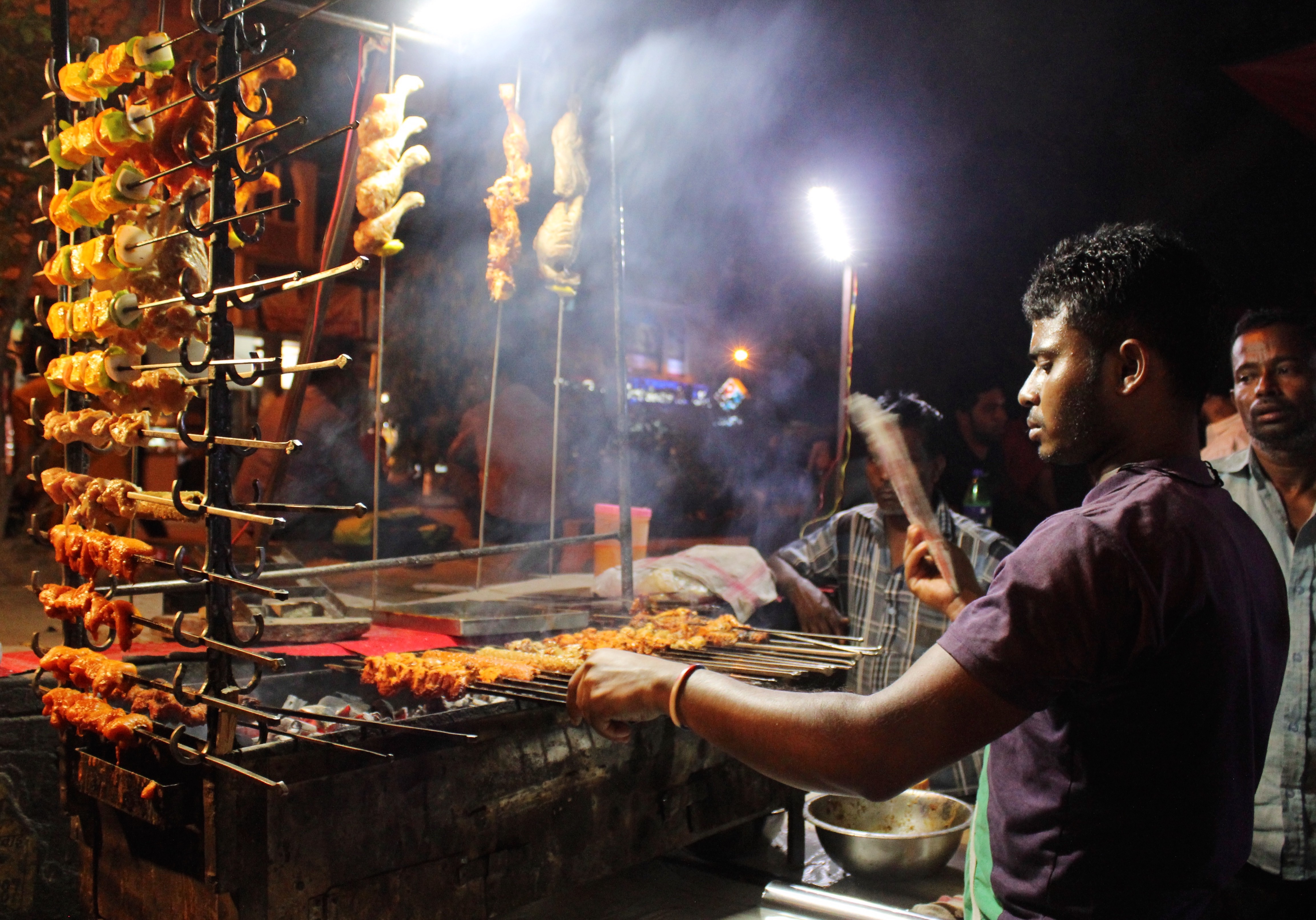
Street kebabs in Delhi

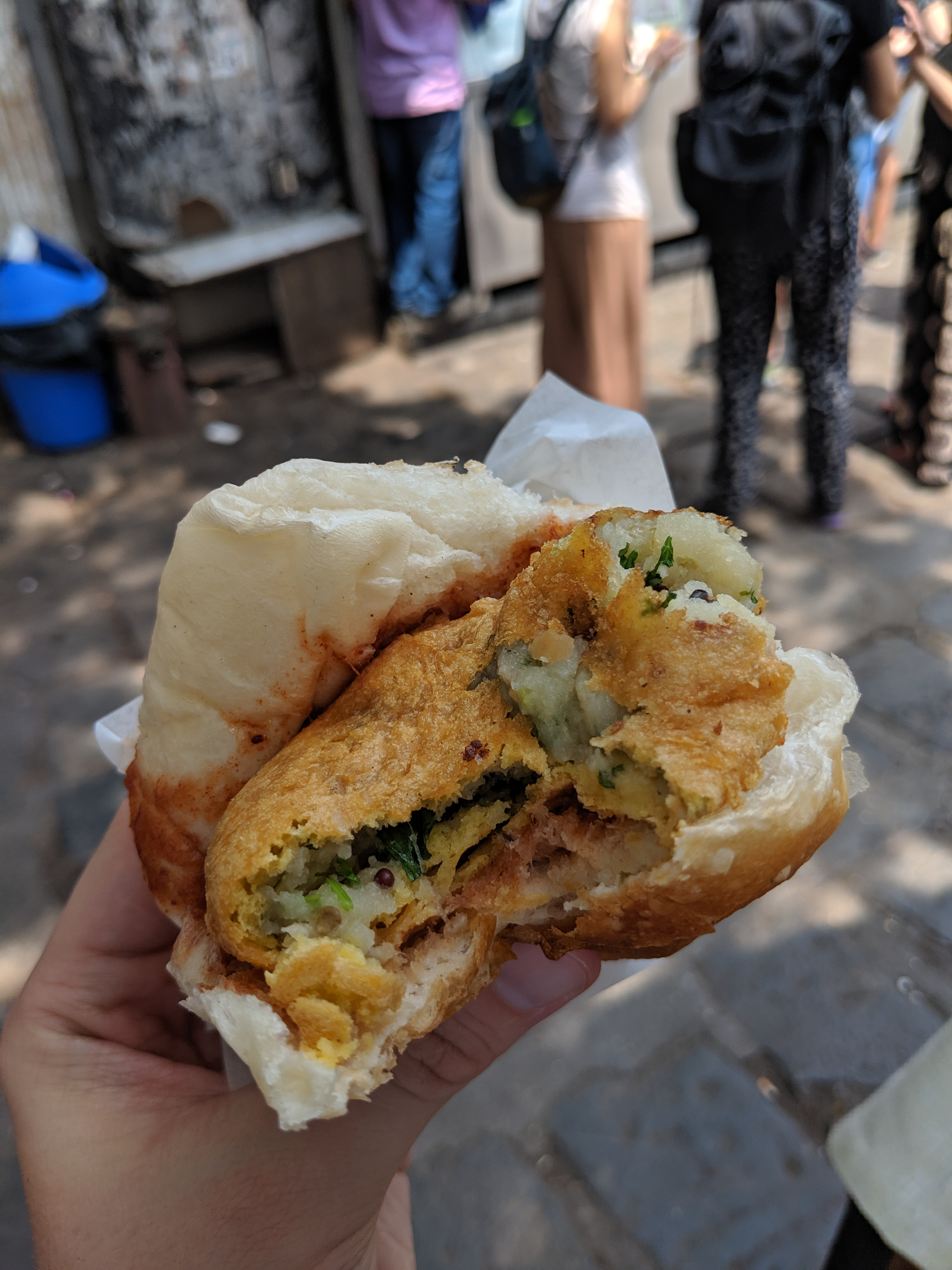
A vada pav eaten on the street in Mumbai

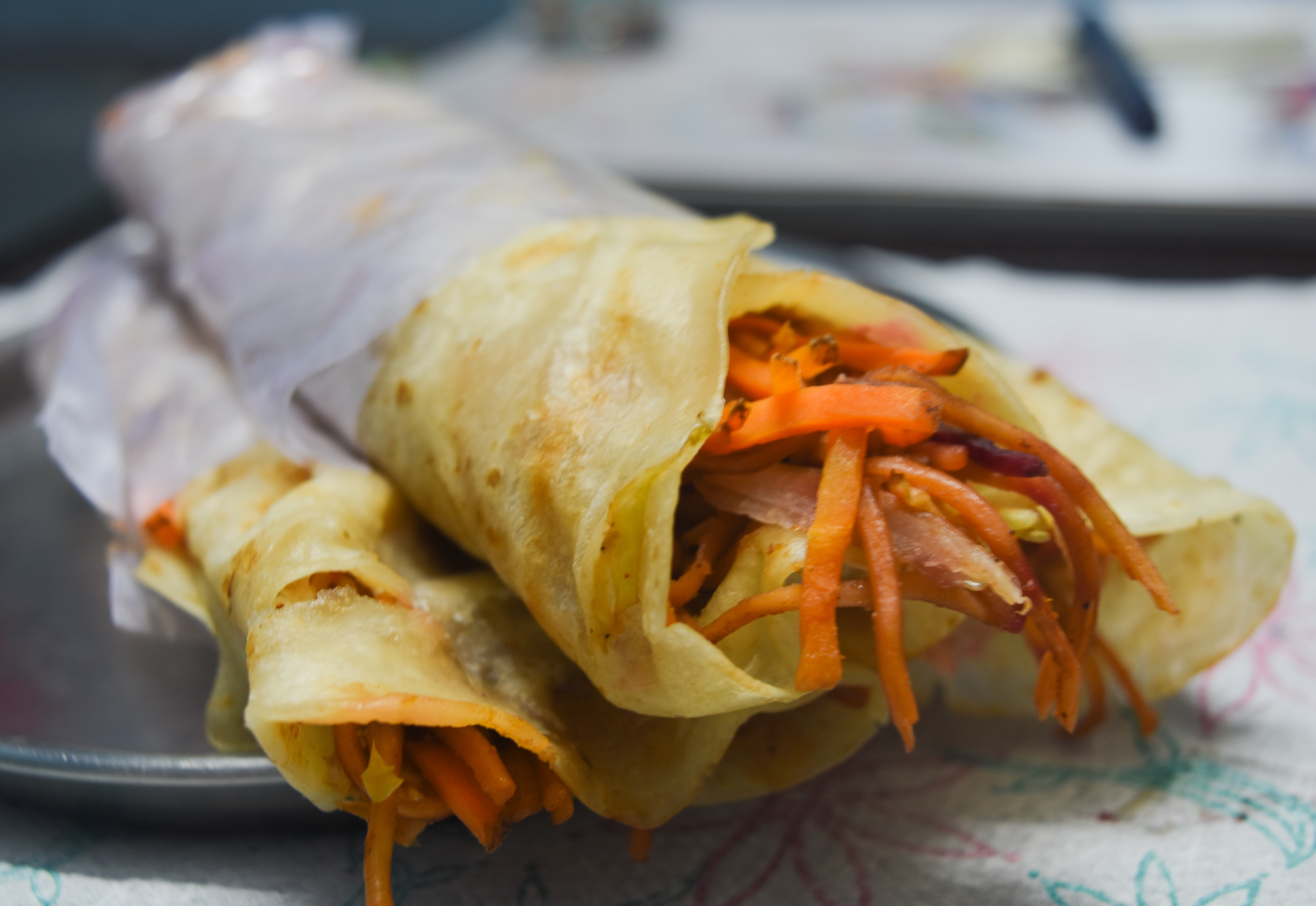
Kati rolls in Kolkata

=== North ===
In North India, such as in Uttar Pradesh, a main meal is usually wheat bread such as chapatis, dal, and vegetable dishes such as cauliflower; some people may have a meat curry instead of a vegetable. The Indo-Persian technique of dum pukht is widespread in North India. It places meat and vegetables in a pot whose lid is sealed up with dough, and cooks them over a low heat. Kashmir's wazwan banquets feature an array of rich meat dishes of goat, lamb (such as rogan josh), and chicken, but avoid dal.

Cuisine of North India

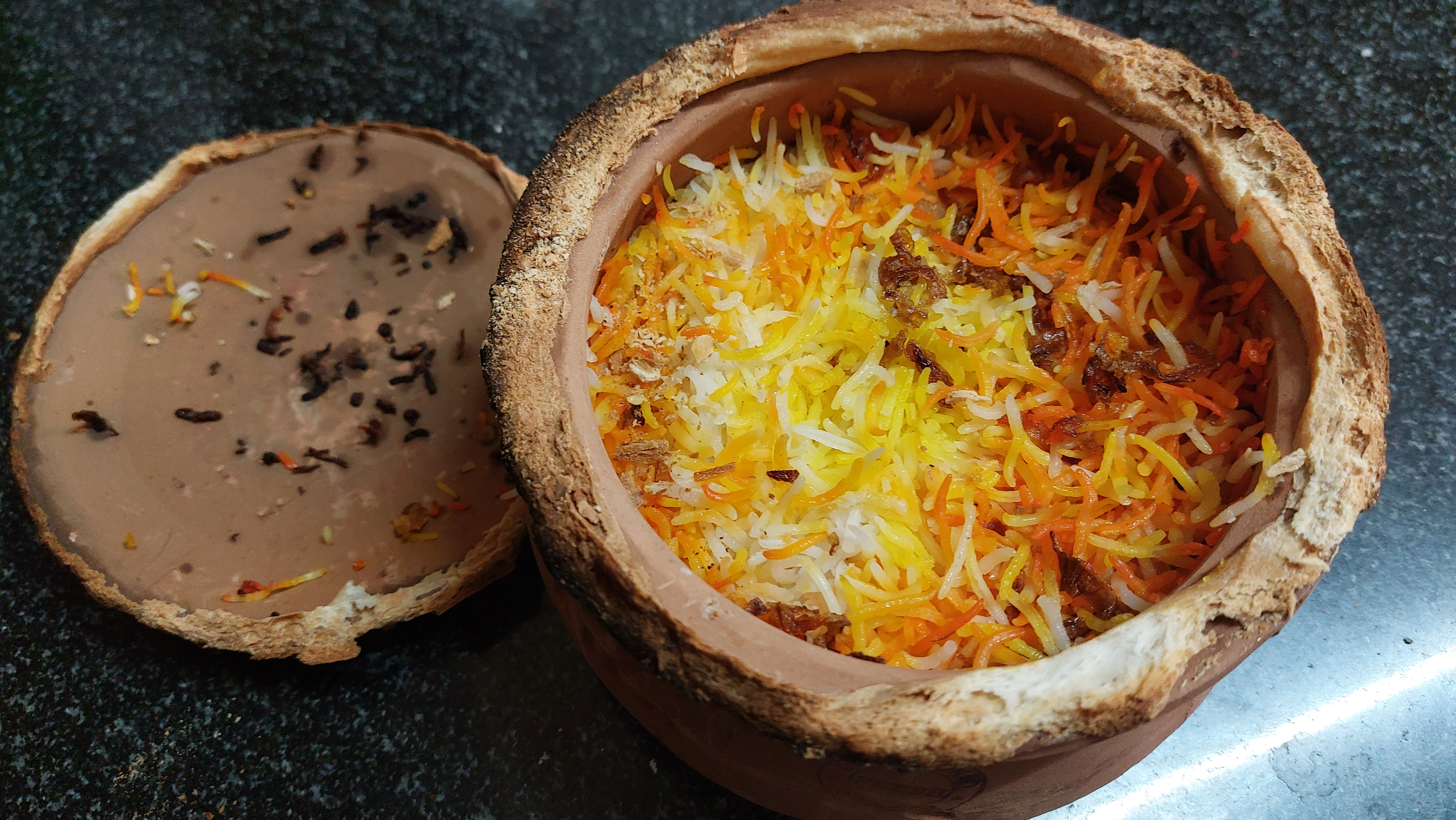
Lucknow style dum biriyani cooked in the dum pukht method in a dough-sealed clay pot

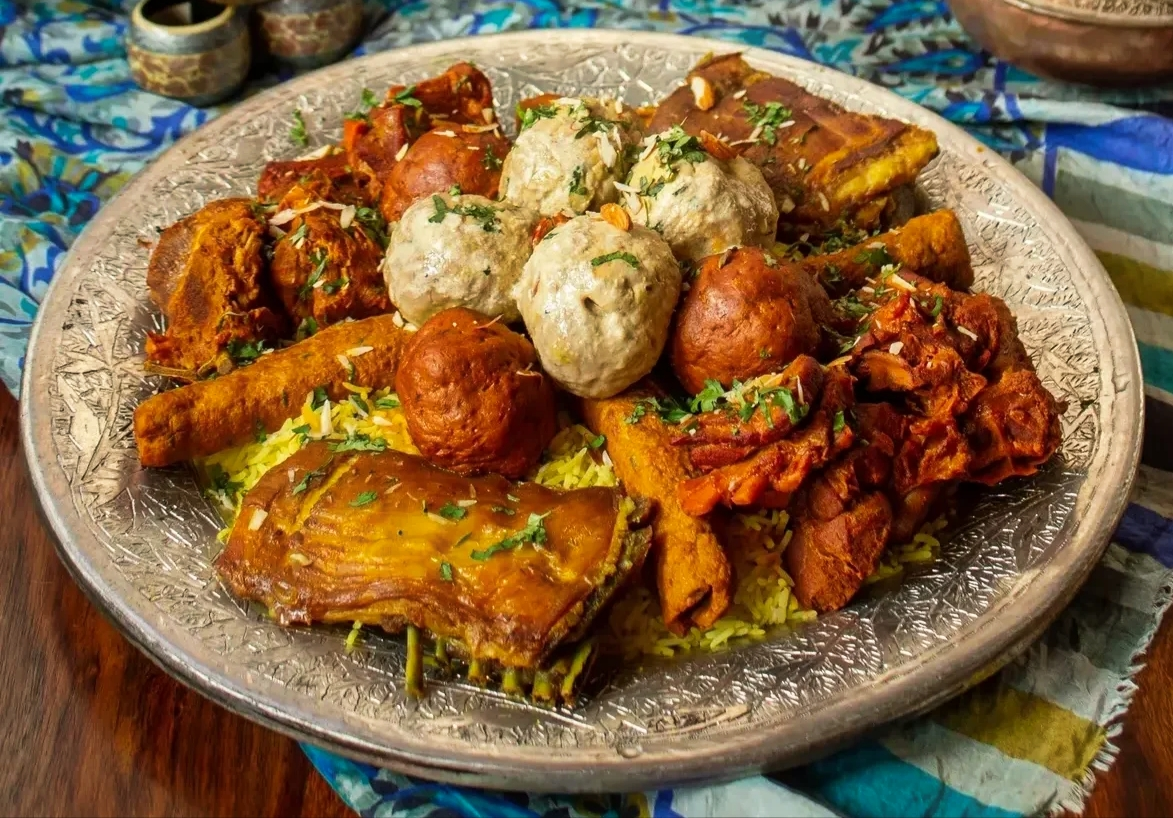
Kashmir wazwan banquets feature rich meat dishes.

=== West ===
In West India, such as in Maharashtra, meals are served with sweets like shrikhand (a strained yoghurt pudding) and main dishes simultaneously in a thali. The prevalence of Jainism in Gujarat means that most of that state's food is vegetarian, as in the characteristic undhiyu stew of five vegetables. The food historian K. T. Achaya names rice, khichdi with mung beans, vegetable pulao, and flatbreads made with sorghum (jowar), pearl millet (bajra), and maize as widespread in the region. The cuisine of Goa blends Portuguese and Indian influences, with pork curries including vindaloo and sorpotel.

Cuisine of West India

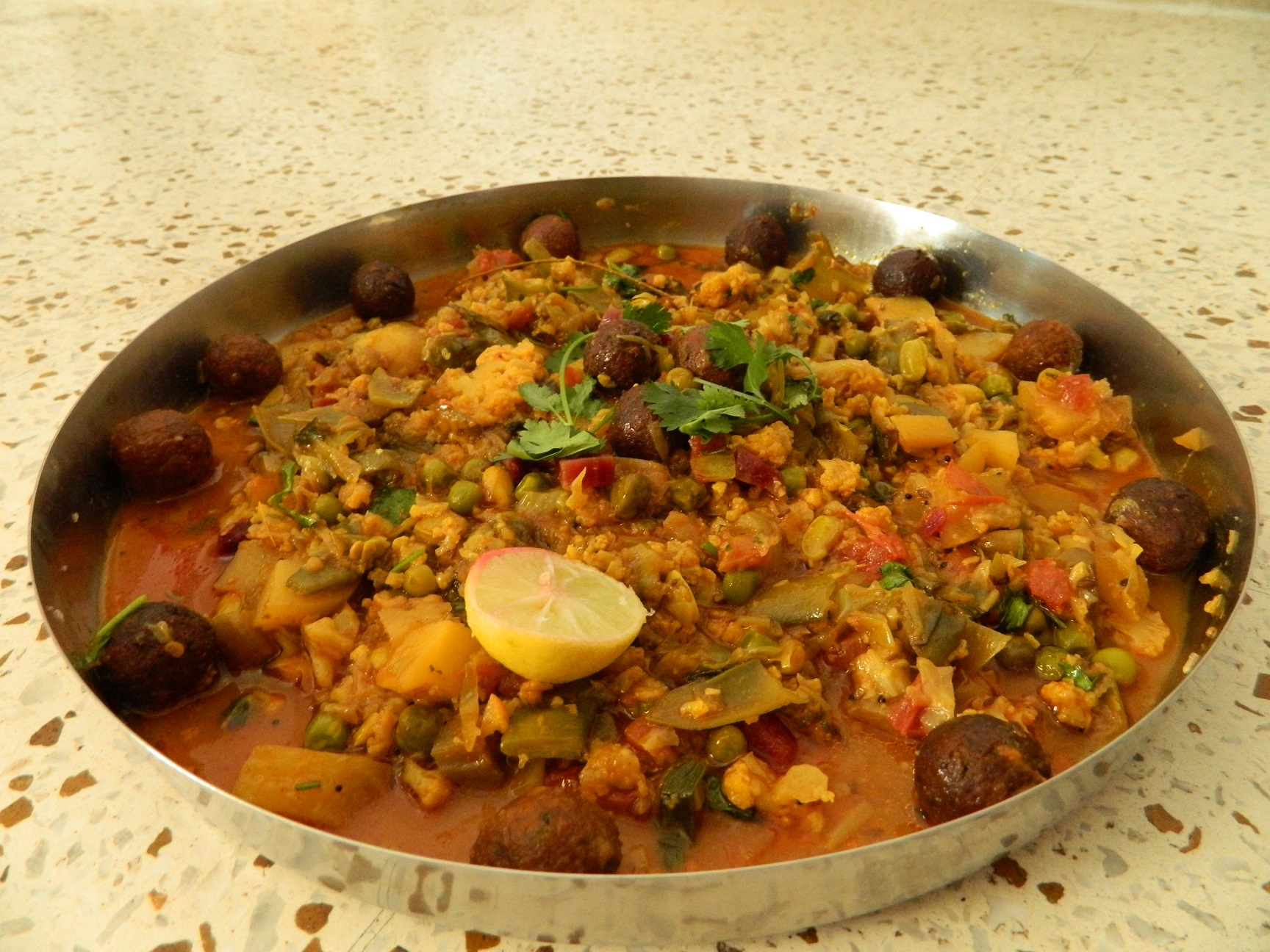
Gujarat-style Undhiyu five-vegetable stew

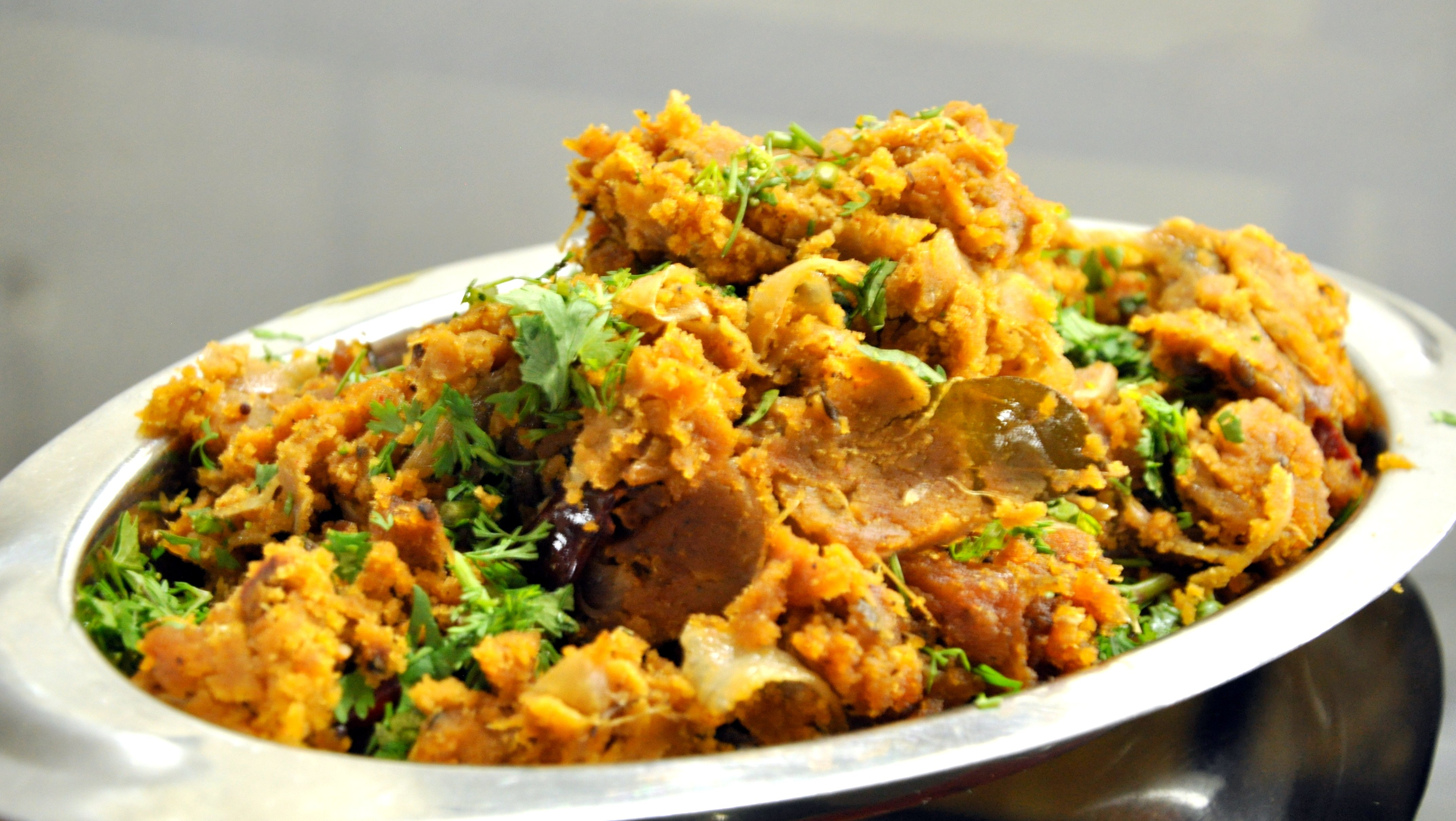
Jhunka

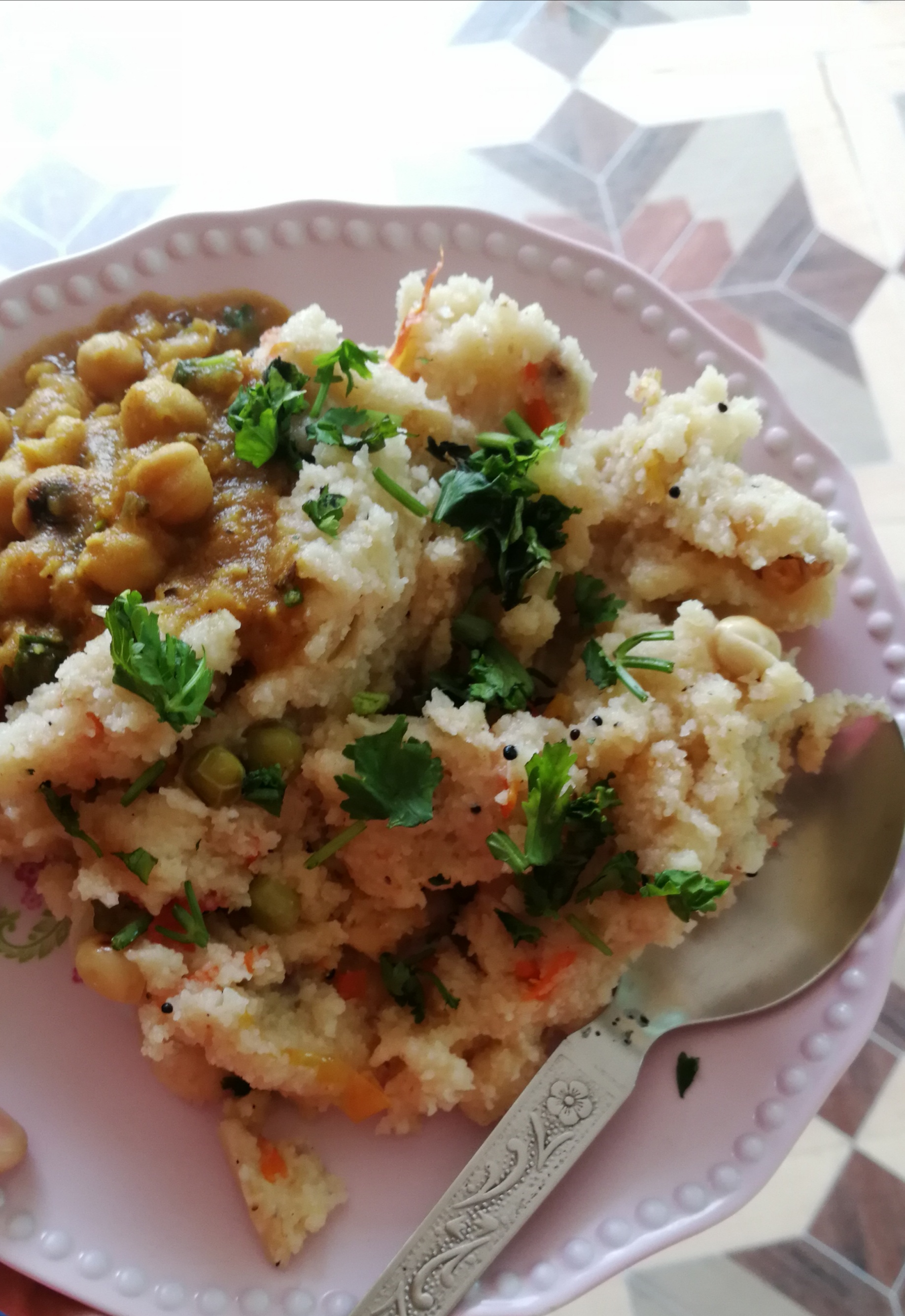
Chhole Upma

=== East ===
In East India, as in West Bengal, fish such as carp, hilsa, and barramundi (bhekti) and sweets such as sandesh (a sweetened milk or cheese dessert) are favoured. Vaishnavite cuisine of Bengal is strictly vegetarian, even avoiding onions. Rice is the state's staple, while mustard is used as an oil, as fried seeds, and as a spicy paste. The classic meal of Bihar is litti chokha, a dish of balls of dough stuffed with sattu black chickpea flour, with spiced vegetables.

Cuisine of East India

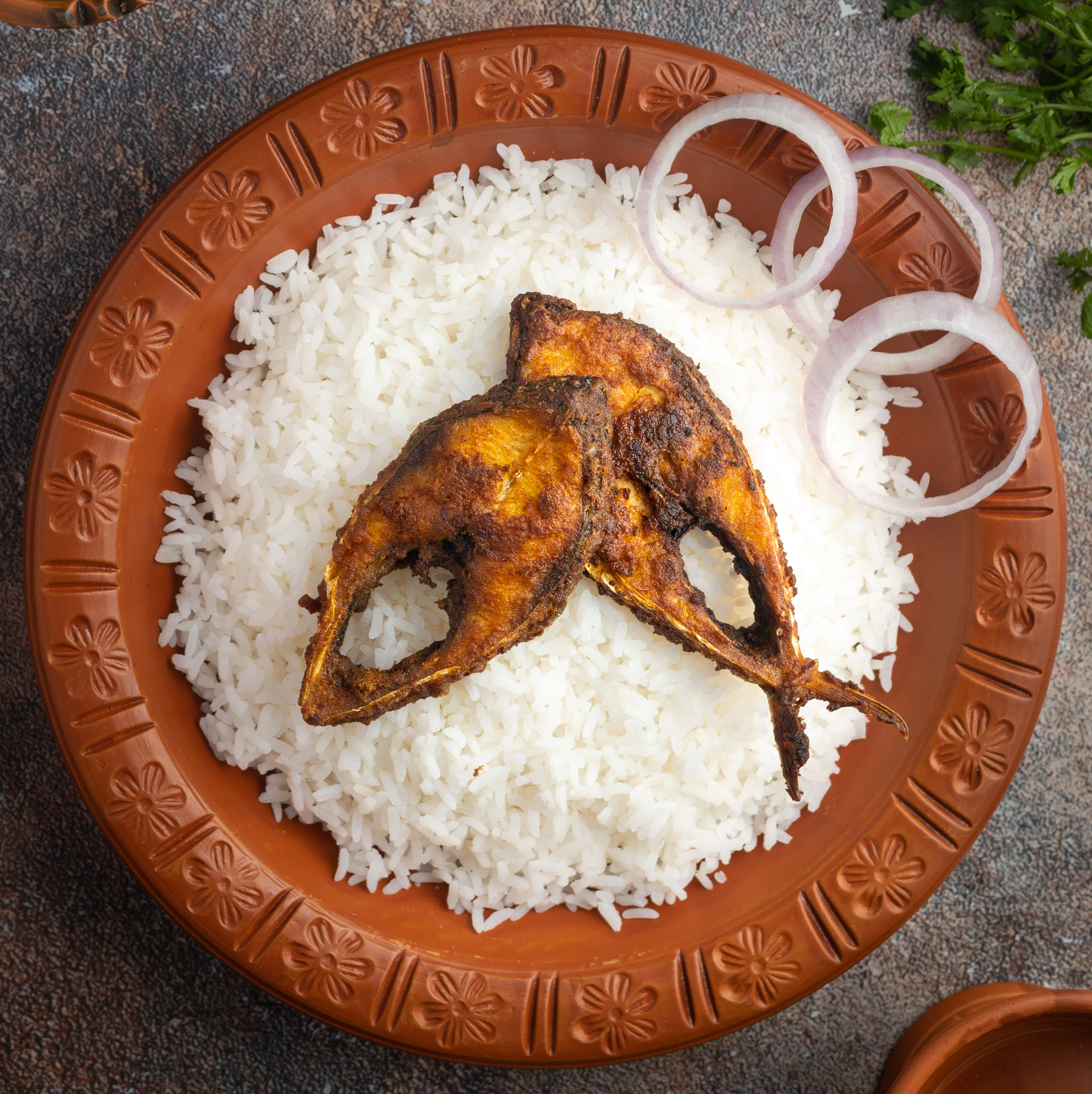
Hilsa is a highly prized fish in Bengal.

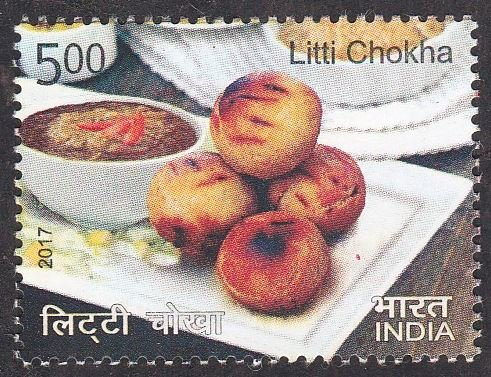
Bihar's classic dish, litti chokha, on an Indian postage stamp

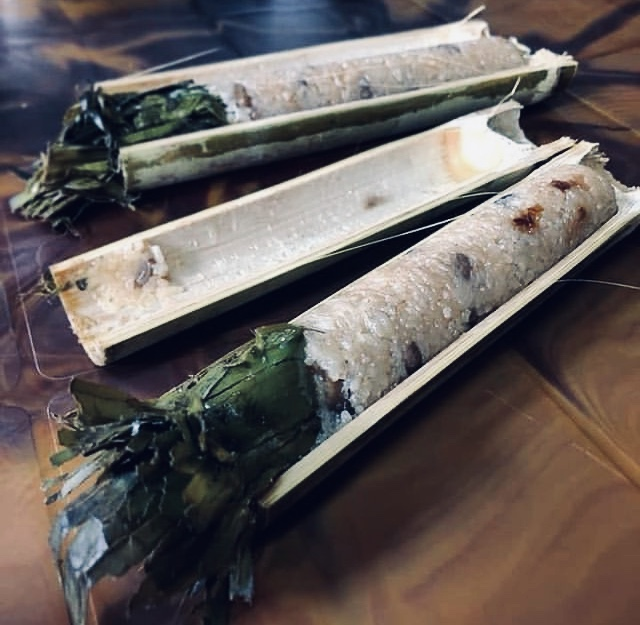
Bamboo steamed rice, the region's staple food

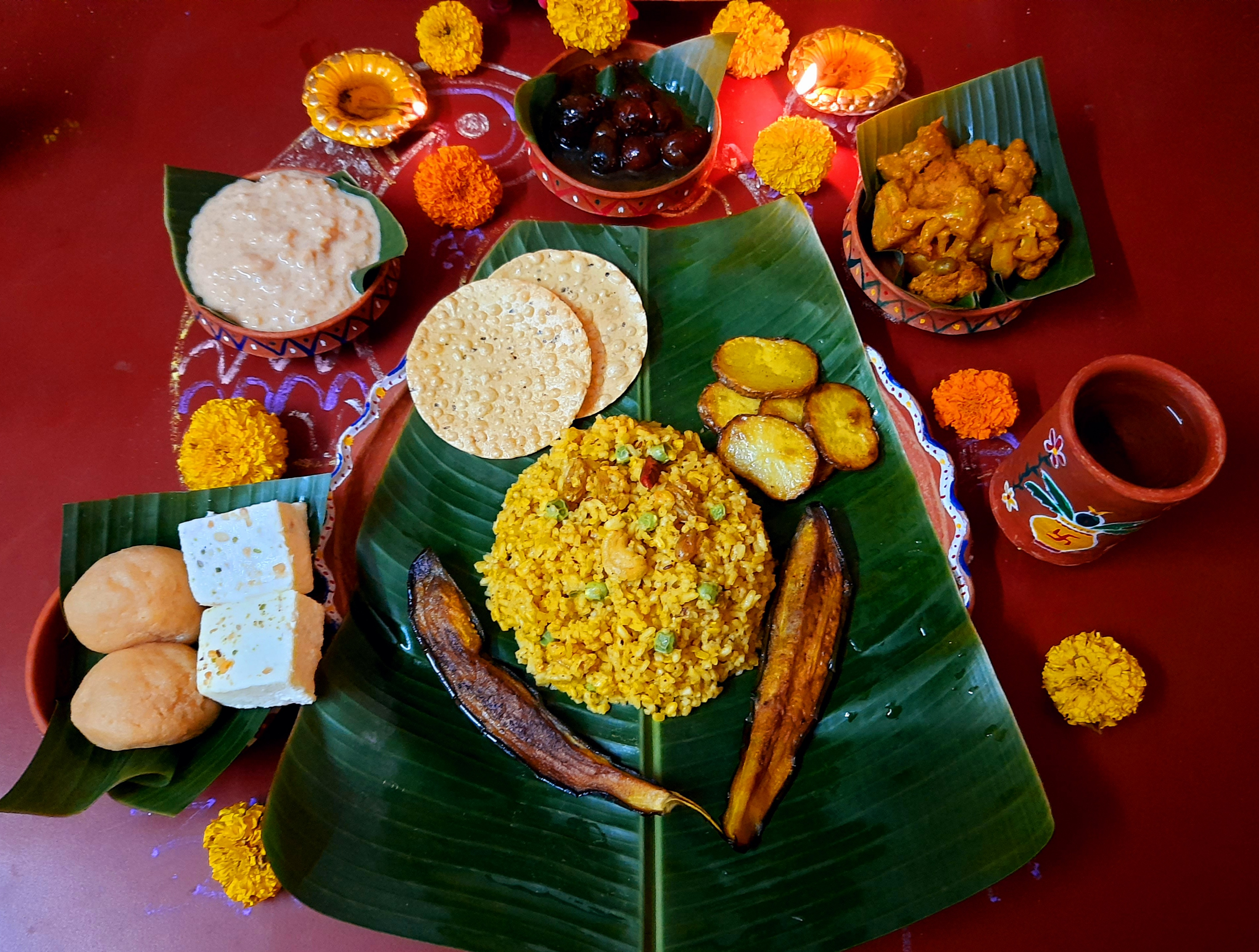
A thali as a prasāda temple offering

=== South ===
In South India, steaming is a widespread cooking technique, while coconut is a characteristic ingredient. Most of the South has rice as a staple, but Karnataka's staples are a balance of rice, wheat, and finger millet (ragi). A traditional Karnataka dish is Bisi Bele Bhat, a spiced mixture of lentils, rice, and vegetables.

Cuisine of South India

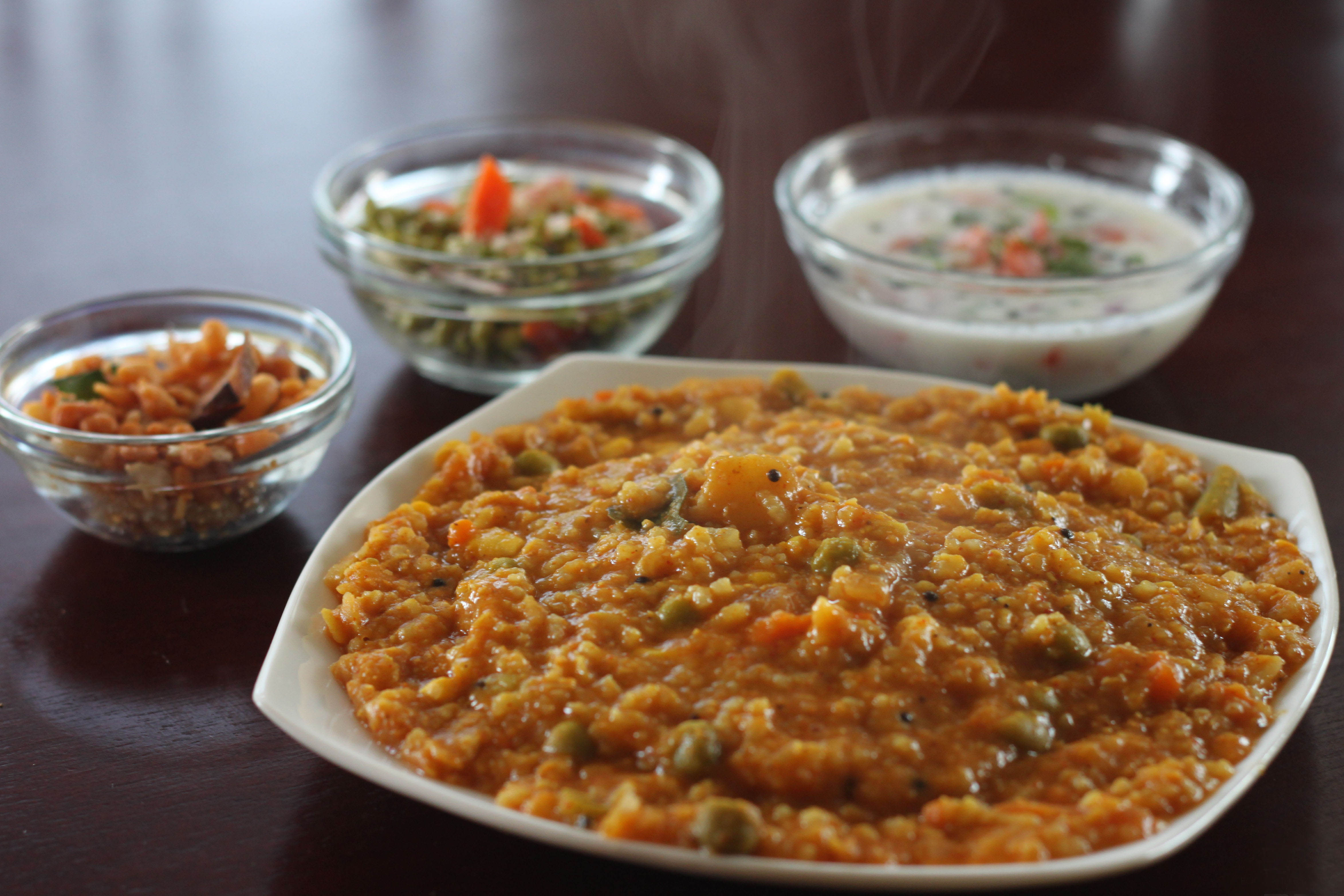
Bisi Bele Bhat, popular breakfast in Karnataka

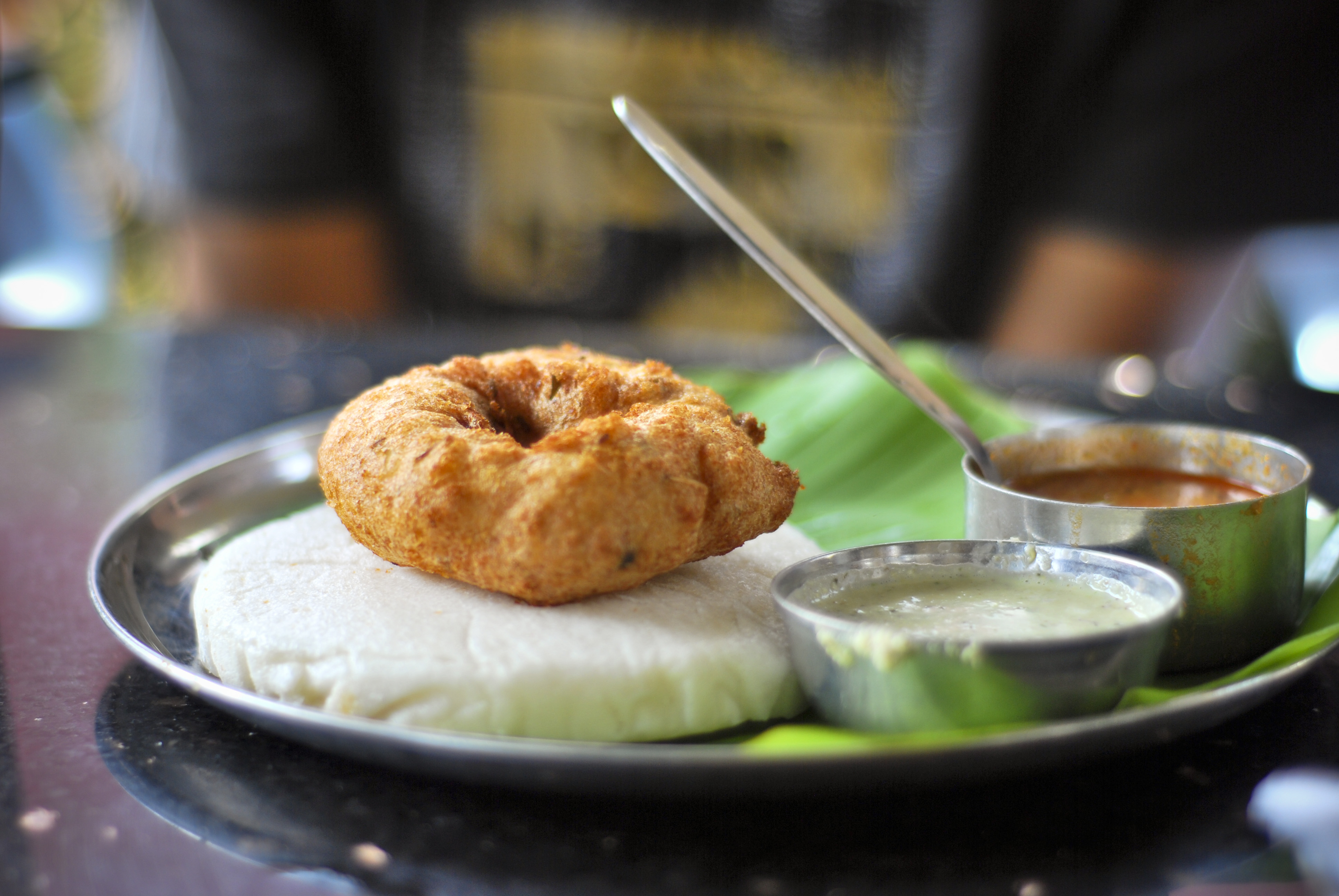
Thatte Idli, a popular plate sized Idli variant in Karnataka

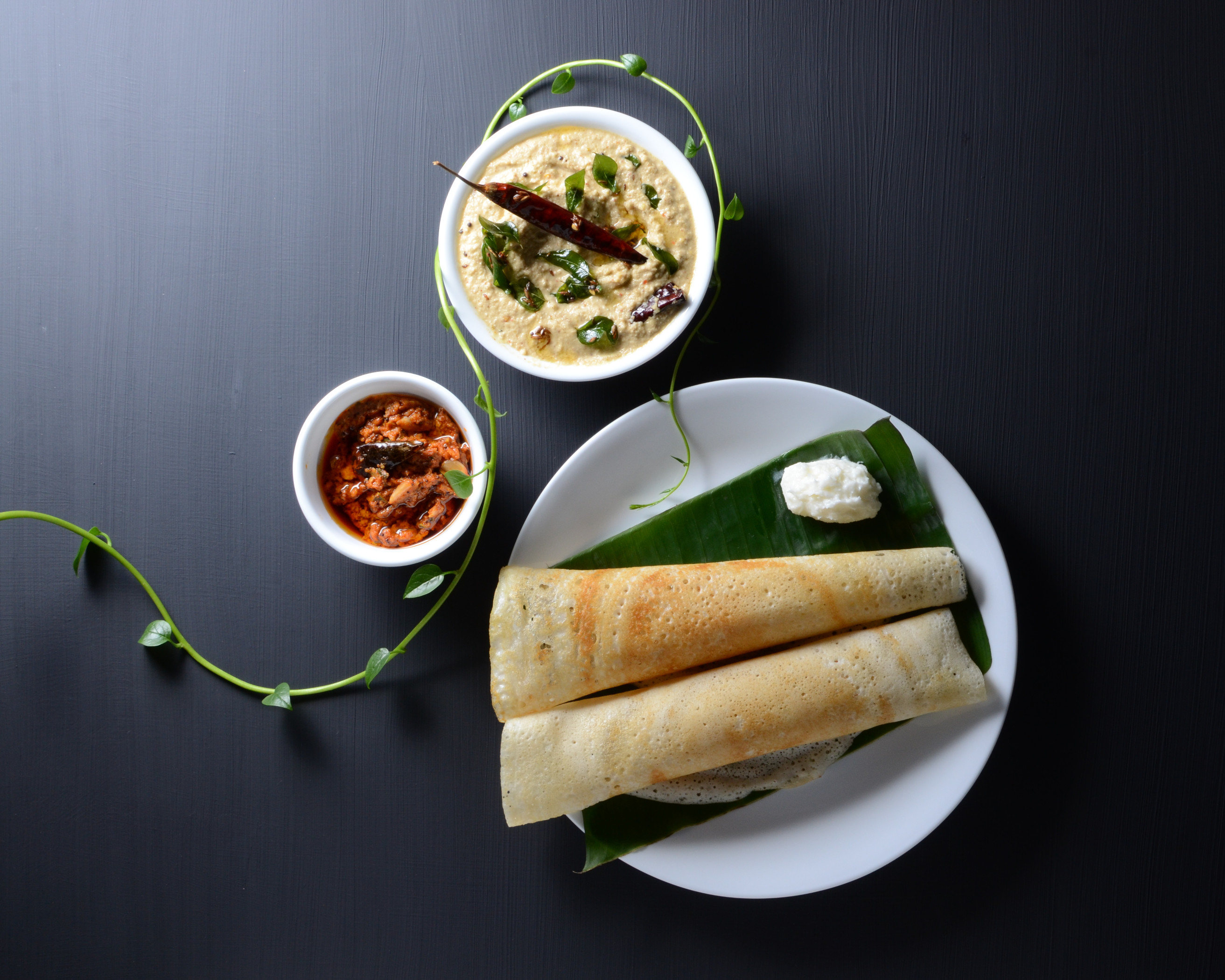
Dosa bread of gram and rice flour

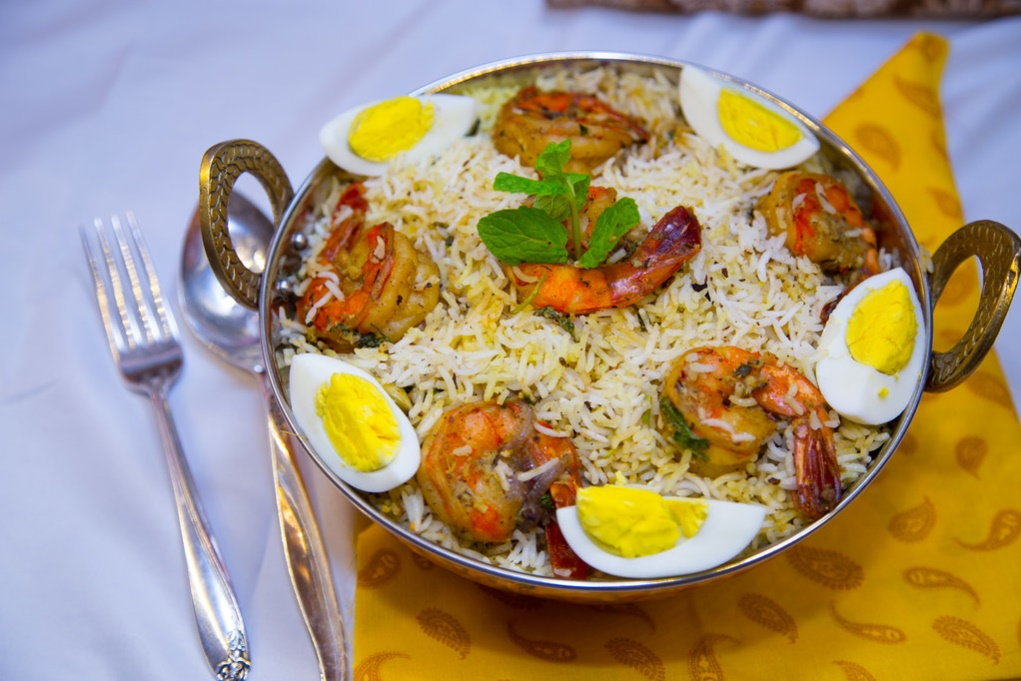
Prawn Biryani

== Diet for religious observations and festivals ==
The Hindu calendar has many festivals and religious observations, and dishes specific to that festival are prepared.

=== Prasāda and Naivedya ===
A material offering to a deity is called naivedya, 'offering of food', it is tasted by the deity and becomes bhoga, 'tasted', and the food is then returned as a gift and distributed among the devotees as prasāda; these terms are often used interchangeably. Vaiṣṇava and Śaiva offerings are typically vegetarian, whereas some Śākta practices include non-vegetarian offerings, involving animal sacrifices.

=== Festival dishes ===
Hindus prepare special dishes for different festivals. Kheer and Halwa are two desserts popular for Diwali. Puran poli and Gujia are prepared for Holi in different parts of India.

=== Diet on fasting days ===
Hindus fast on several days of the year in honour of different gods. Only certain kinds of food are allowed to be eaten during the fasting period. These include milk and other dairy products such as curd, fruit and starchy Western food items such as sago, potatoes, purple-red sweet potatoes, amaranth seeds, nuts and shama millet. Popular fasting dishes include Farari chevdo, Sabudana Khichadi or peanut soup.

Popular fasting dishes include farari chevdo, sabudana khichadi, and peanut soup.

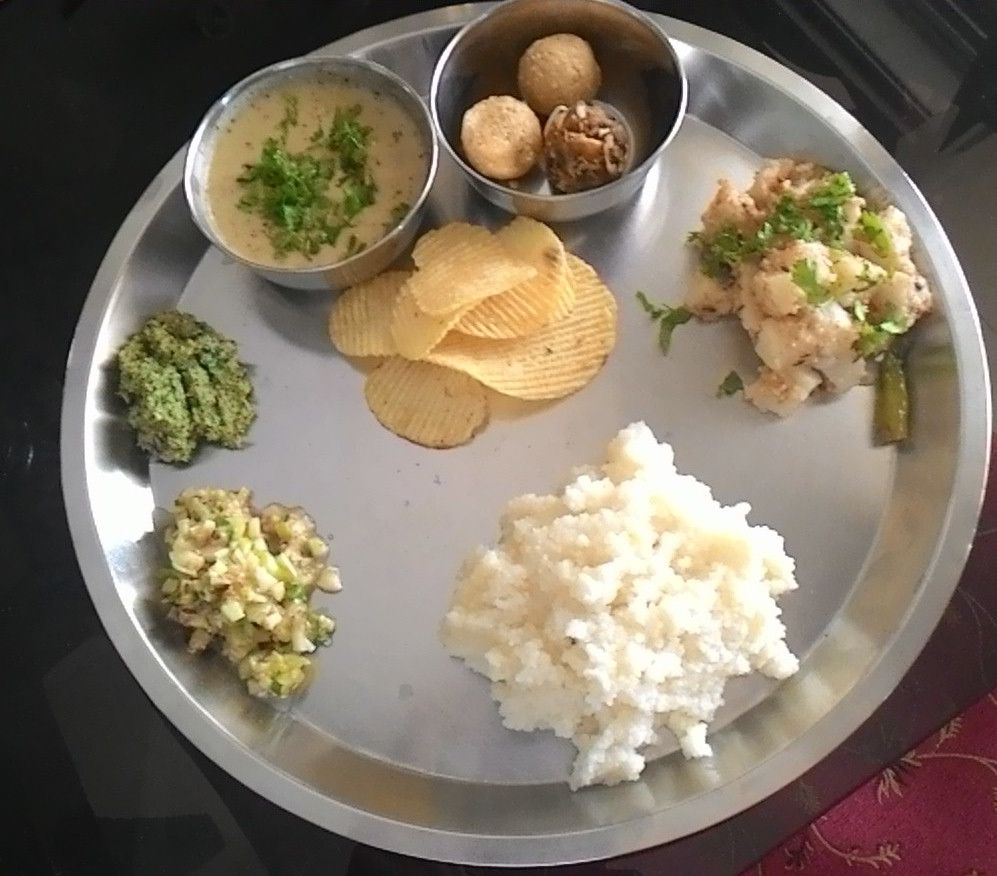
Hindu fasting day lunch menu

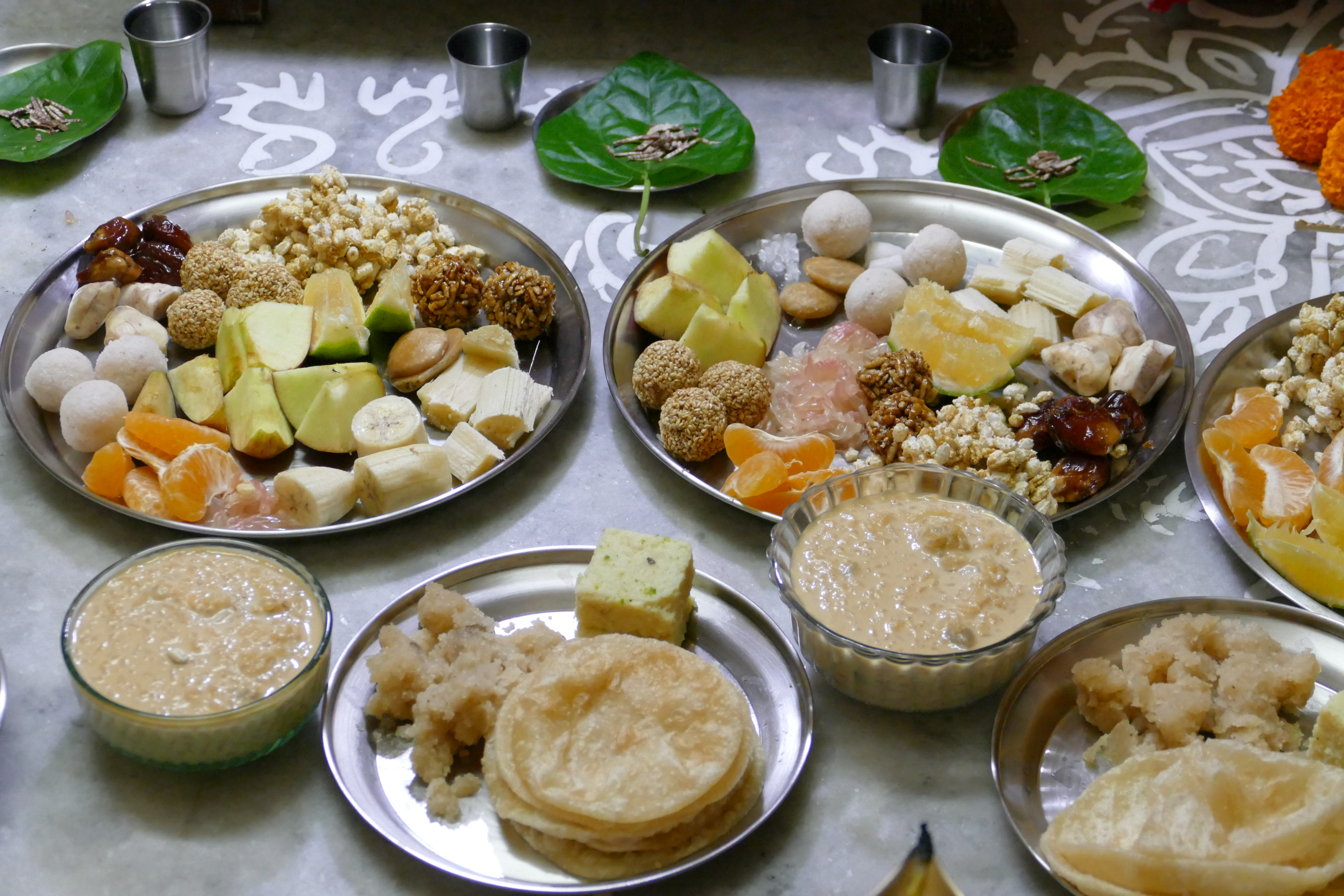
Prasada offered during Puja ceremony at a home in West Bengal

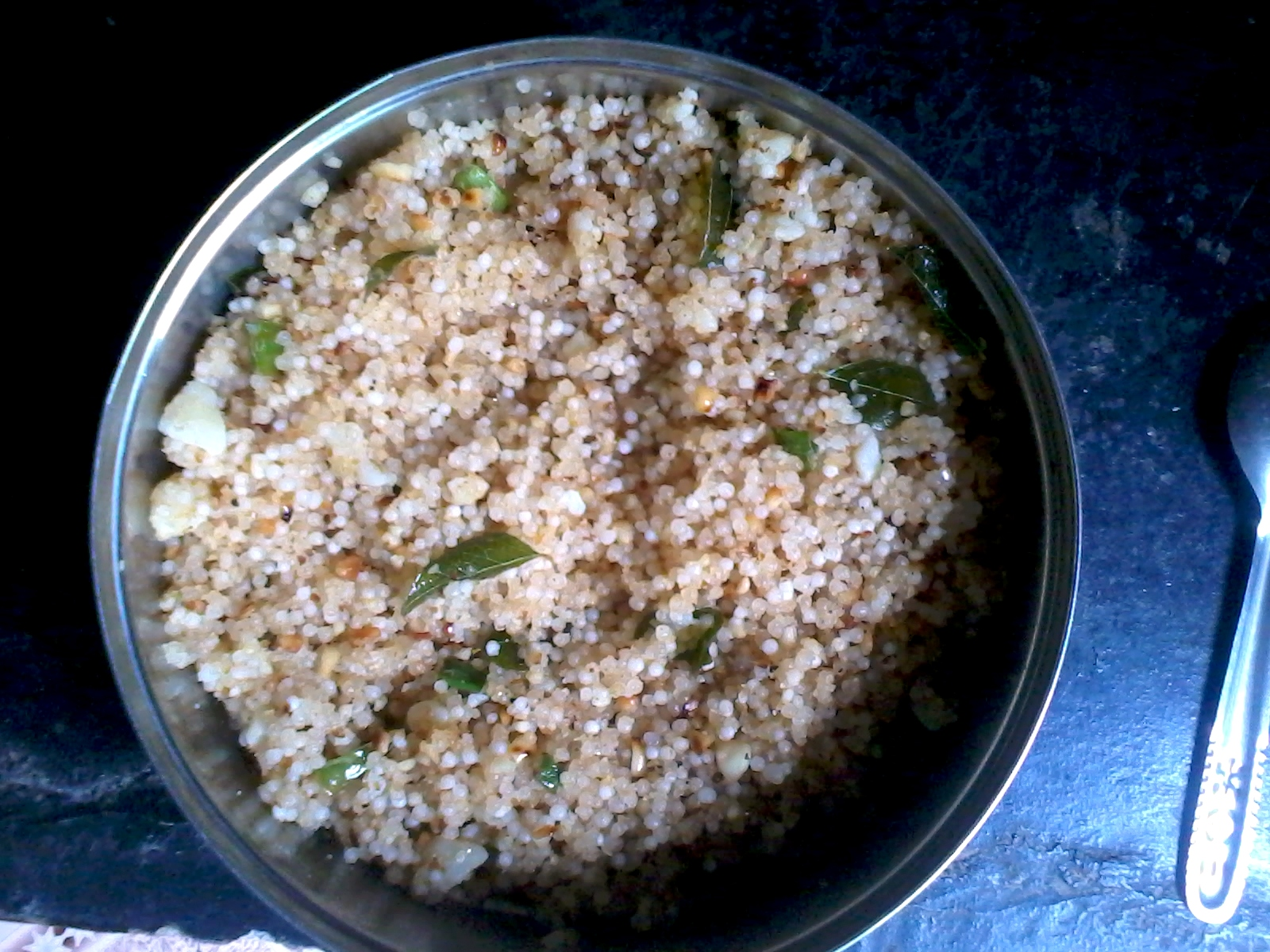
Sabudana khichadi, a snack, popular on Hindu fasting days

== Diaspora and fusion cuisines ==
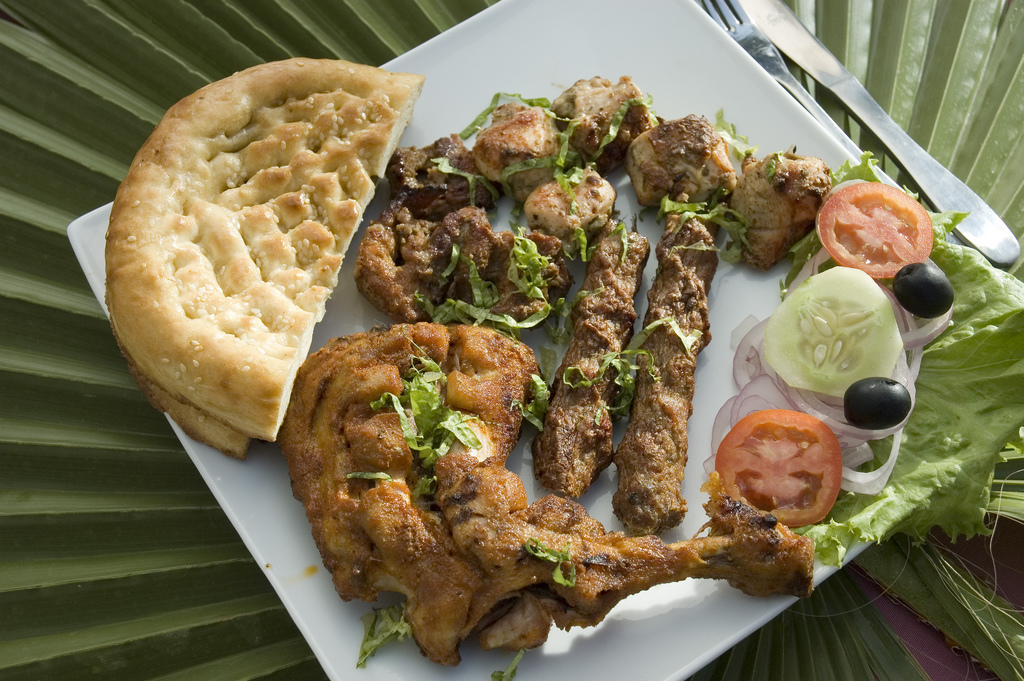
Chicken tikka

The Indian diaspora has spread its culinary traditions throughout the world. These cuisines have been adapted to local tastes, and have affected local cuisines. The international appeal of curry has been compared to that of pizza. Indian tandoor dishes such as chicken tikka enjoy widespread popularity.

=== Indian Chinese ===
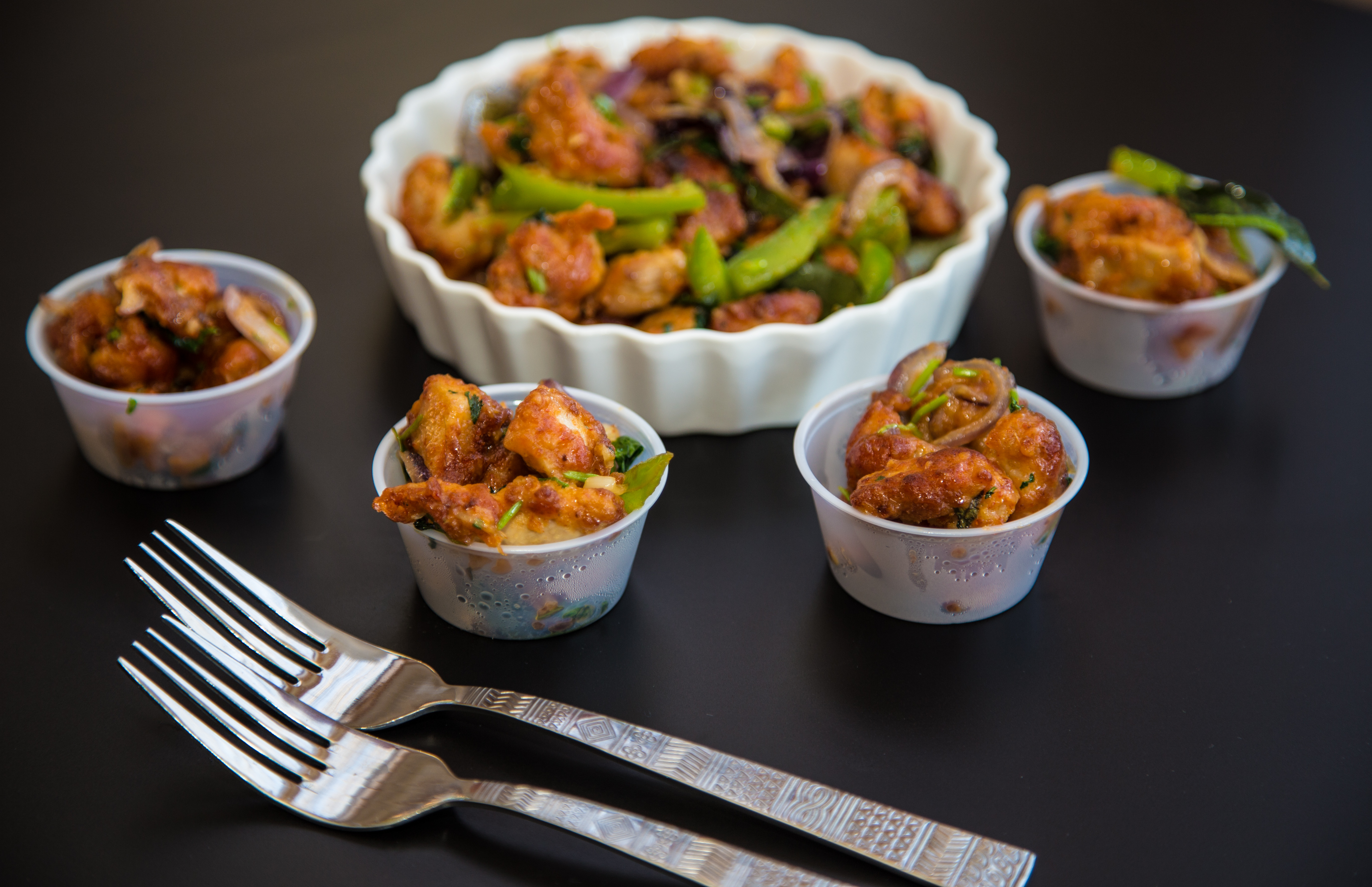
Chicken Manchurian served in Hyderabad

Indian Chinese cuisine originated in the 19th century among the Chinese community of Calcutta, during the immigration of Hakka Chinese from Canton (present-day Guangzhou) seeking to escape the First and Second Opium Wars and political instability in the region. Upon exposure to local Indian cuisine, they incorporated many spices and cooking techniques into their own cuisine, thus creating a unique fusion of Indian and Chinese cuisine.

Indian food is gaining popularity in China, where there are many Indian restaurants in Beijing, Shanghai, and Shenzhen. Hong Kong alone has more than 50 Indian restaurants, some of which date back to the 1980s. Most of the Indian restaurants in Hong Kong are in Tsim Sha Tsui.

After 1947, many Cantonese immigrants opened restaurants in Calcutta, serving dishes that combined aspects of Indian cuisine with Cantonese cuisine. In other parts of India, Indian Chinese cuisine is derived from Chinese cuisine, but bears little resemblance to their Chinese counterparts as the dishes tend to be flavoured with cumin, coriander seeds, and turmeric, which with a few regional exceptions, are not traditionally associated with Chinese cuisine. Chilli, ginger, garlic and dahi (yogurt) are frequently used in dishes.

=== In Southeast Asia ===
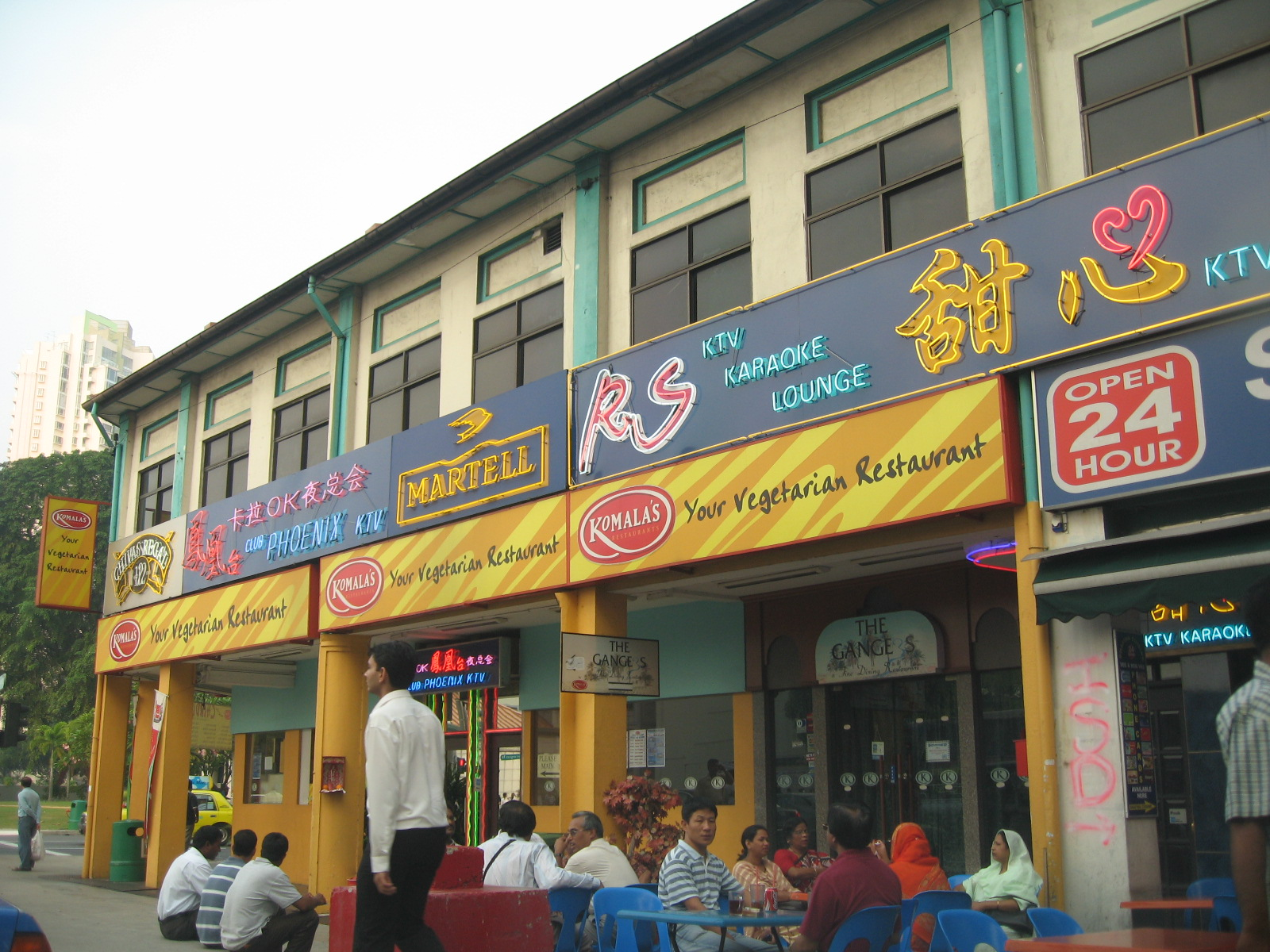
An Indian restaurant in Singapore

Indian cuisine is popular in Southeast Asia, due to the strong Hindu and Buddhist cultural influence in the region. It has had considerable influence on Malaysian and Singaporean cooking. Indian Singaporean cuisine is often local Tamil Muslim, although North Indian food has increased in the 21st century. Other cuisines that borrows a significant inspiration from Indian cooking styles include Cambodian, Lao, Indonesian, Thai, and Burmese, and to a lesser extent Filipino and Vietnamese. The spread of vegetarianism in Southeast Asia has been credited to Hindu and Buddhist practices. Singapore is known for its fusion of Singaporean cuisine with Indian influences. Fish head curry, for example, is a local creation.

Thai cuisine was influenced by Indian cuisine, as recorded by the Thai monk Buddhadasa Bhikku in his writing 'India's Benevolence to Thailand'. He wrote that Thai people learned how to use spices in their food in various ways from Indians. Some plants like sarabhi of family Guttiferae, kanika or harsinghar, phikun or Mimusops elengi and bunnak or the rose chestnut were brought from India.

Indian influence within Indonesian cuisine began in the 4th century. Following the spread of Islam to Indonesia, Muslim Indian as well as Middle Eastern influences made their way into the cuisine. Andreas Maryoto, a food history journalist, suggests there were two waves of Indian influence. The early arrival was marked by the adoption of Hindu culture still prevalent in Java. The second wave came from the Mughal Empire, with its Islamic culture. This influence can be seen in Sumatra, especially in Aceh and West Sumatra.

Indian Filipino cuisine includes Atchara pickles, derived from Indian achar, via the acar of Indonesian and Malaysian Indian cuisine.

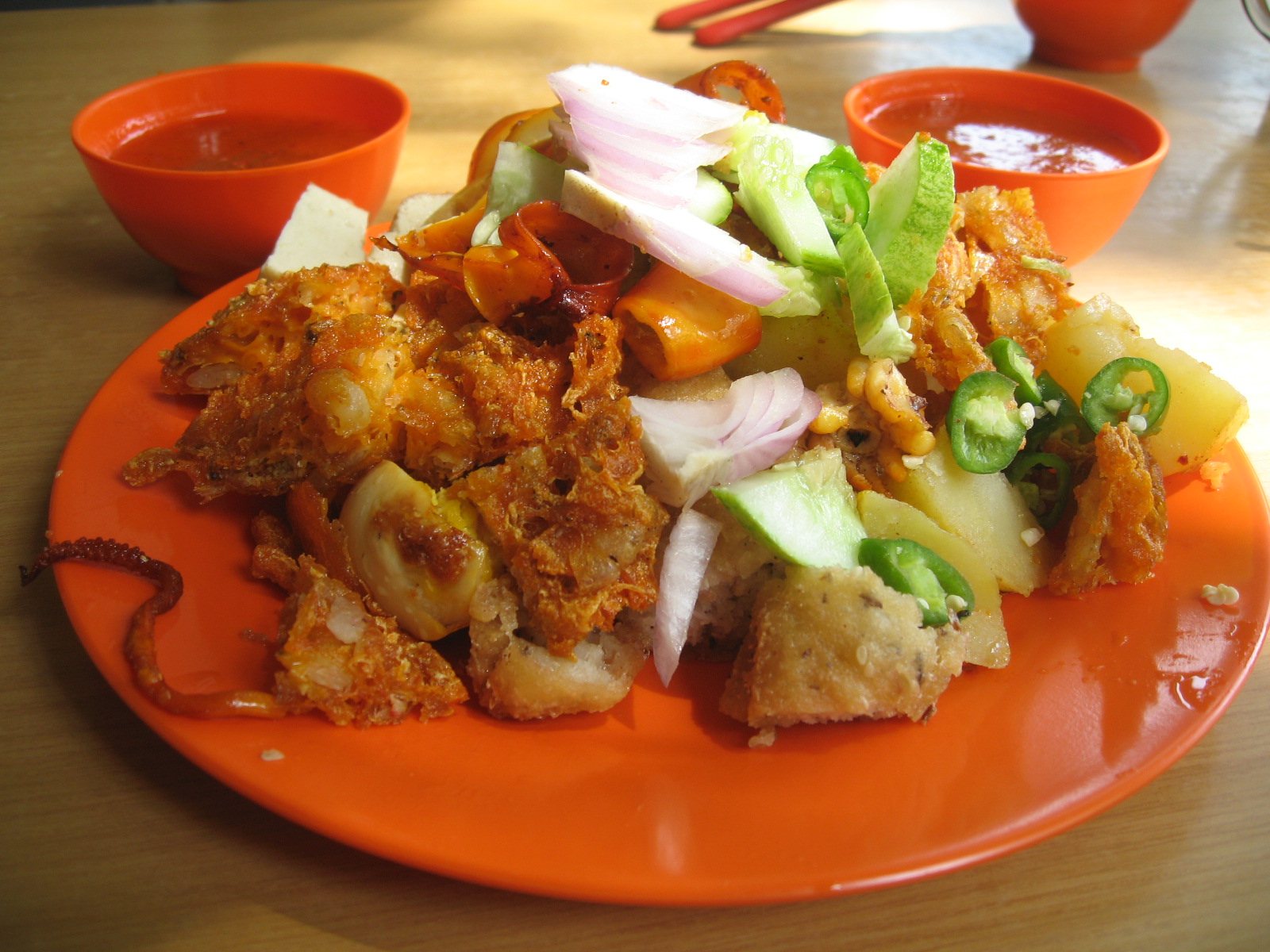
Rojak in Malaysian Indian cuisine

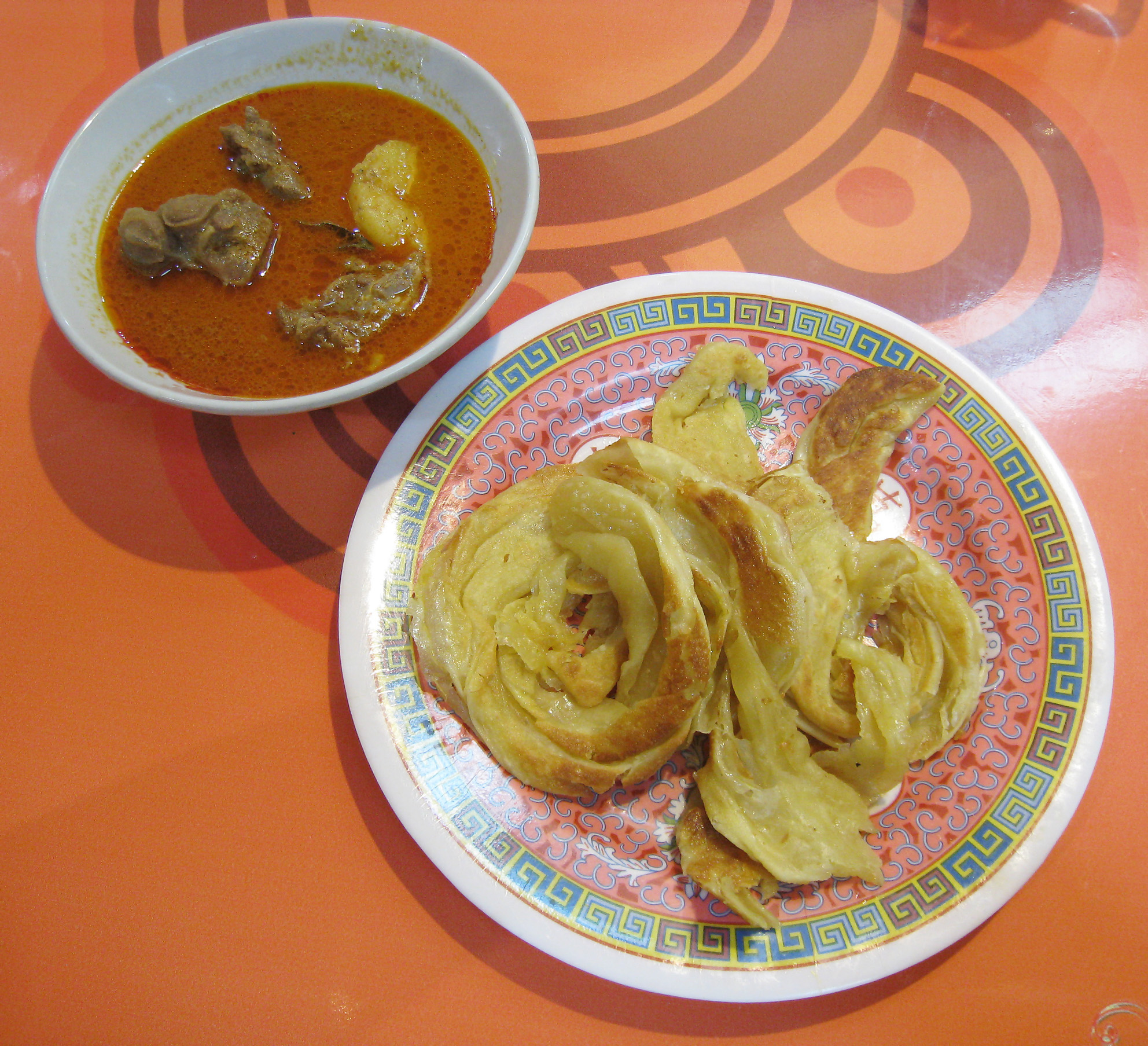
Roti canai and mutton gulai (curry) in Indian Indonesian cuisine

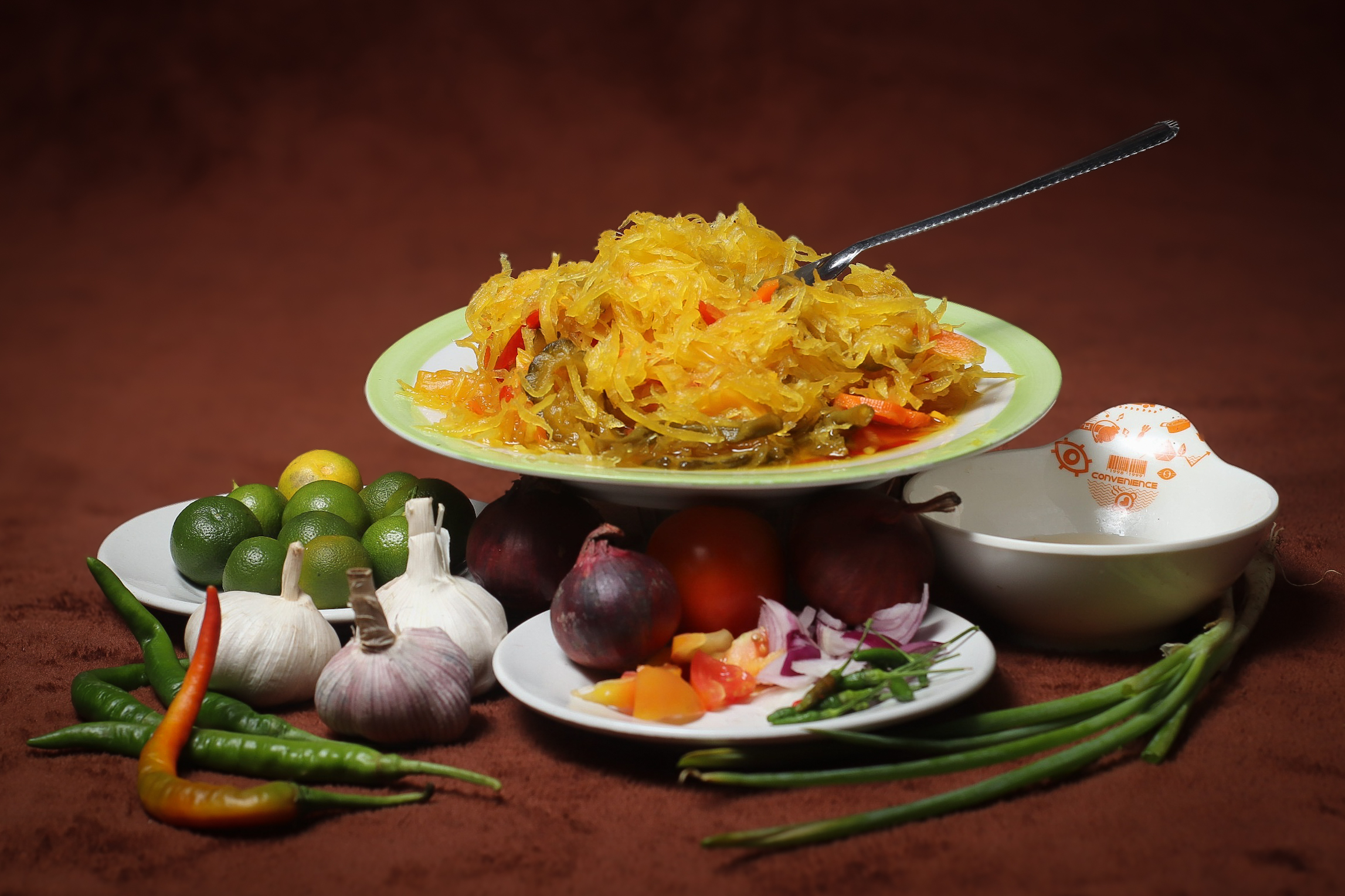
Atchara pickle in Indian Filipino cuisine

=== English-speaking world ===
Anglo-Indian cuisine developed during the period of British colonial rule in India, as British officials interacted with their Indian cooks. It was an eclectic, unsophisticated cuisine, picked by the British from all parts of India. Well-known Anglo-Indian dishes include chutneys, kedgeree, and mulligatawny soup. Britain's first Indian restaurant, the Hindoostanee Coffee House, opened in London in 1810. By the early 21st century, there were as many as 10,000 restaurants serving Indian cuisine in England and Wales alone.

British Indian cuisine, as served in Indian restaurants in Britain, is different, partly developed from Anglo-Indian cuisine; it began to appear in Britain as Anglo-Indians returned home. British Indian restaurant cuisine is characterised by a standard range of curries from mild Korma and hot Madras to very hot Vindaloo and extreme Phall; these names are often unknown in India. Chicken tikka masala has become widespread enough to be described as a national dish.

A 2007 survey by The Washington Post found that more than 1,200 Indian food products had been introduced into the United States since 2000. Indian cuisine is widely available in Canada, especially in cities such as Toronto and Vancouver with substantial populations of Asian Canadians. A survey taken between 2013 and 2018 found that 51% of Australians liked Indian cuisine. Ireland's first Indian restaurant, the Indian Restaurant and Tea Rooms, opened in 1908 on Sackville Street, now O'Connell Street, in Dublin. Indian restaurants are commonplace in most Irish cities and towns, paralleling the growth in Ireland's non-Chinese Asian population.

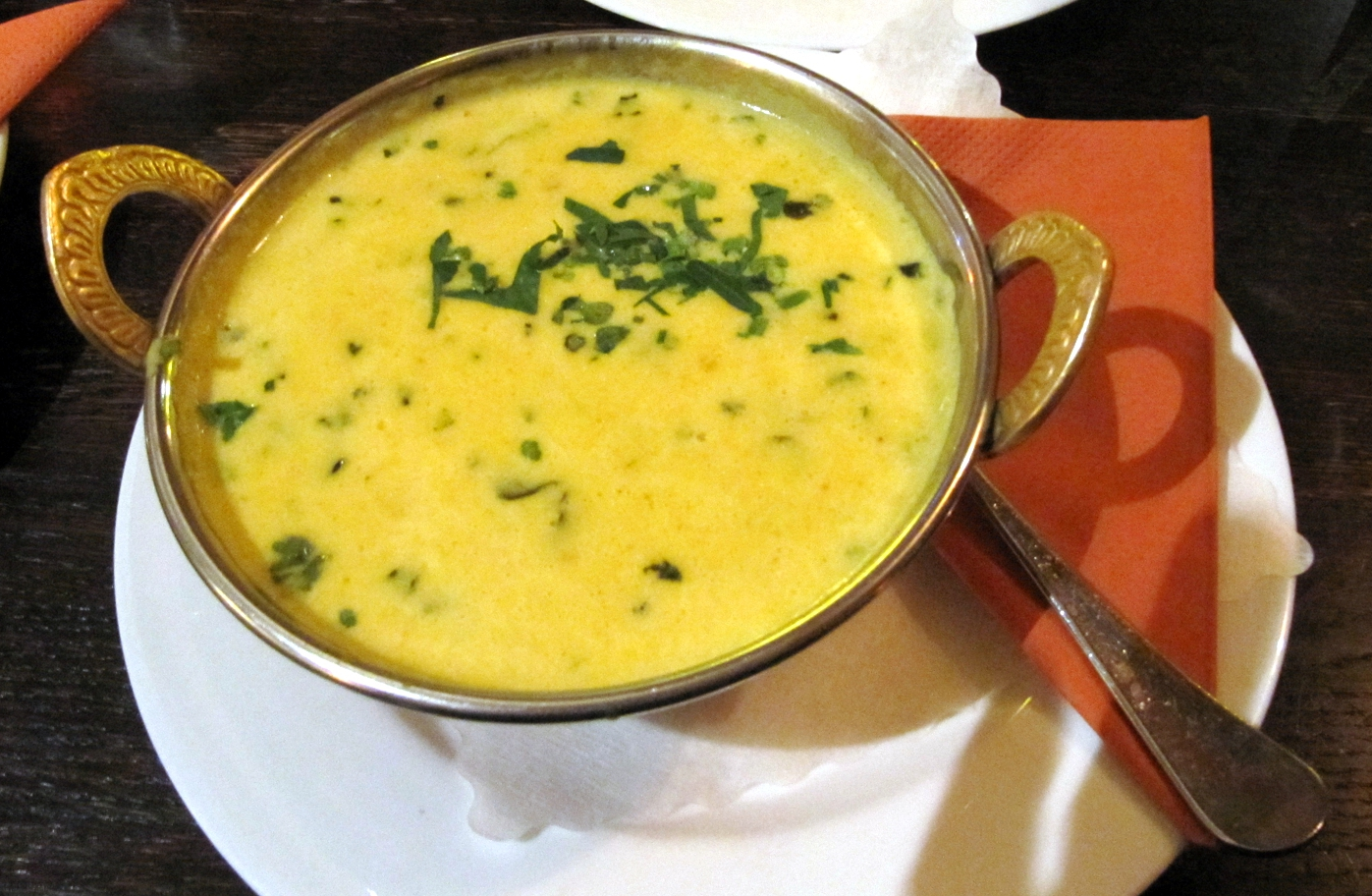
Anglo-Indian style Mulligatawny

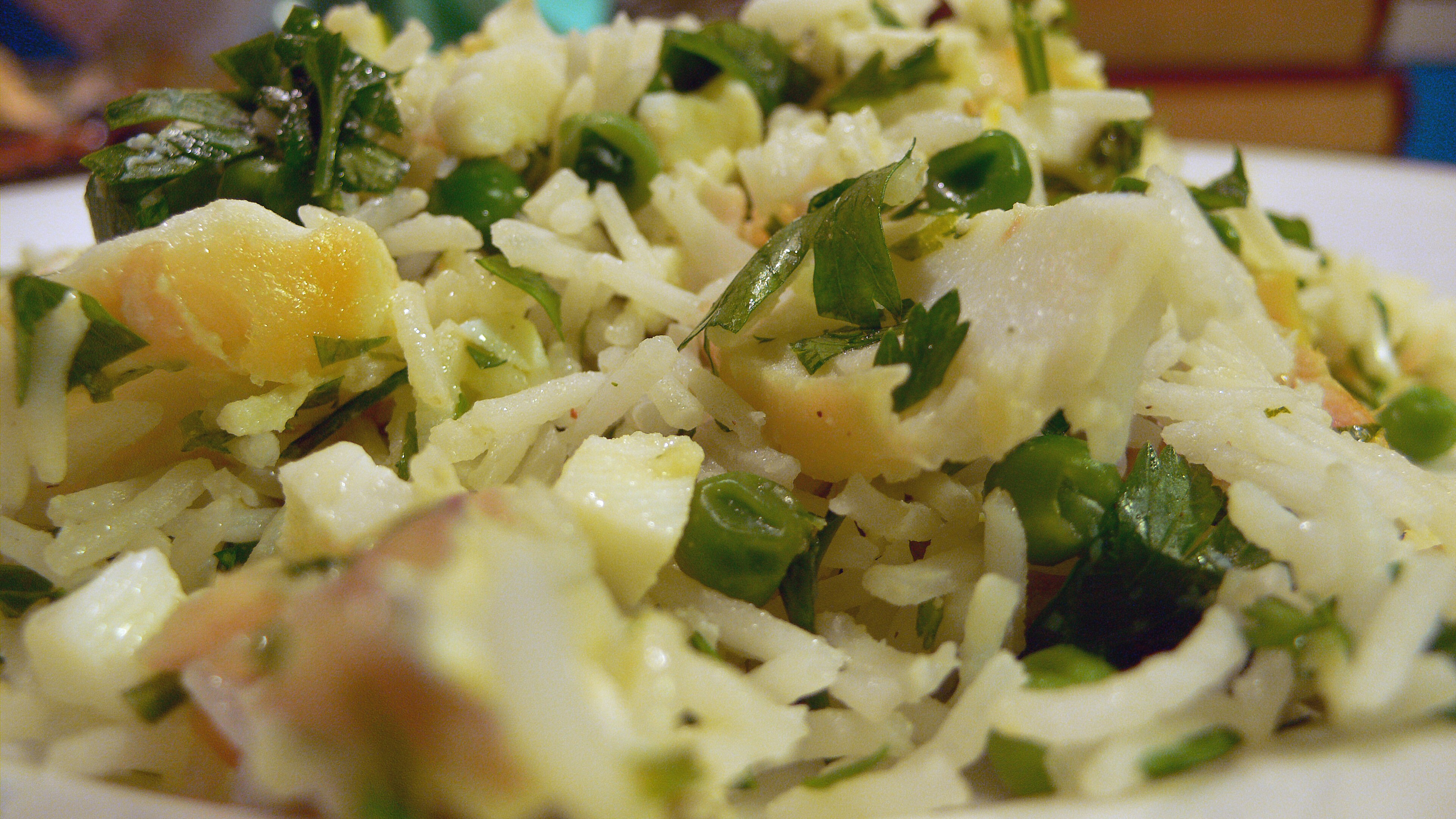
Anglo-Indian kedgeree, from the simple rice-and-lentil dish khichdi

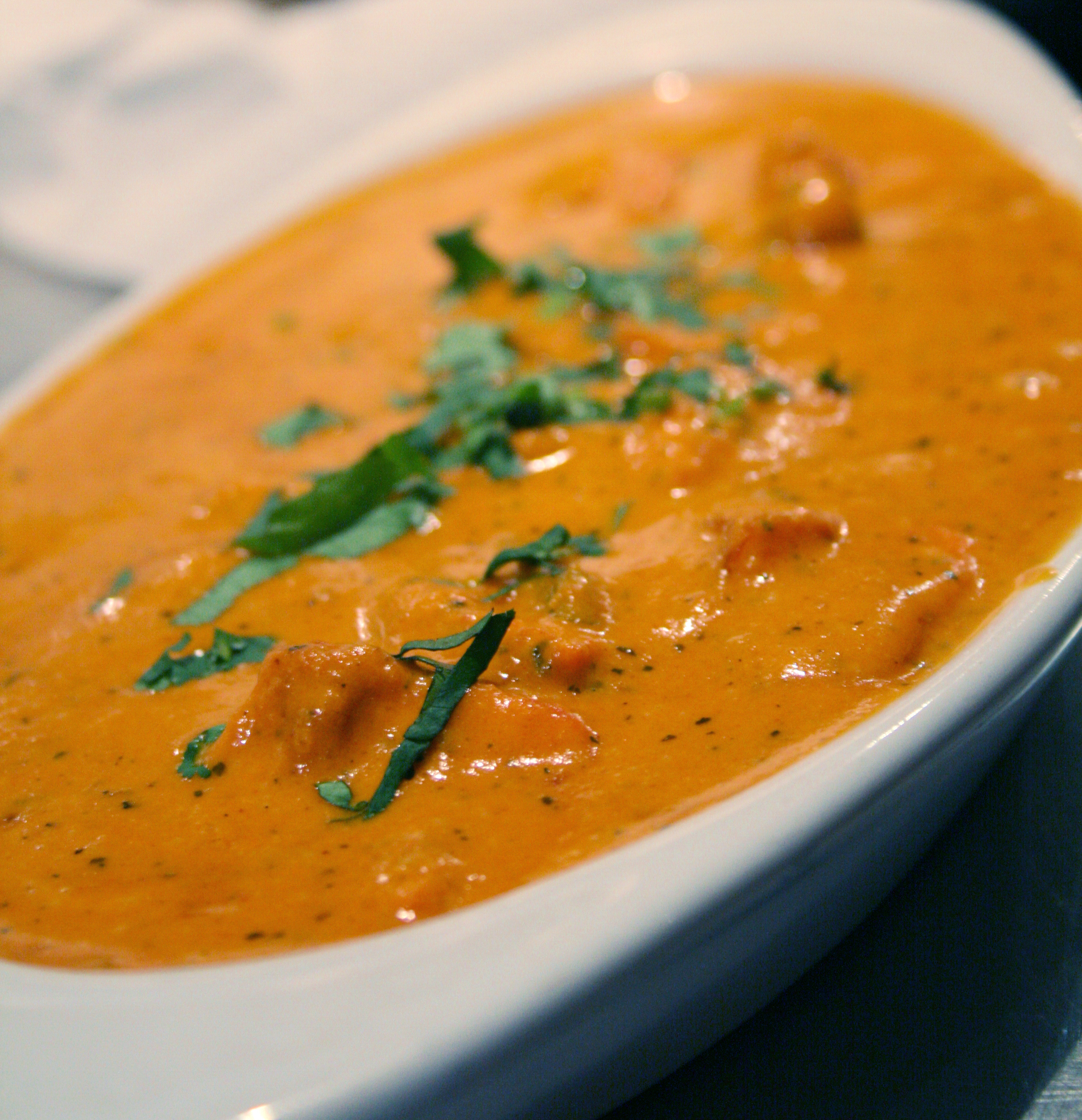
Chicken tikka masala, a British Indian favourite

== Desserts ==
Many Indian desserts, or mithai, are fried foods made with sugar, milk or condensed milk. Ingredients and preferred types of dessert vary by region. In the eastern part of India, for example, most are based on milk products. Many are flavoured with almonds and pistachios, spiced with cardamom, nutmeg, cloves and black pepper, and decorated with nuts, or with gold or silver leaf. Popular Indian desserts include rasogolla, gulab jamun, jalebi, laddu, and peda.

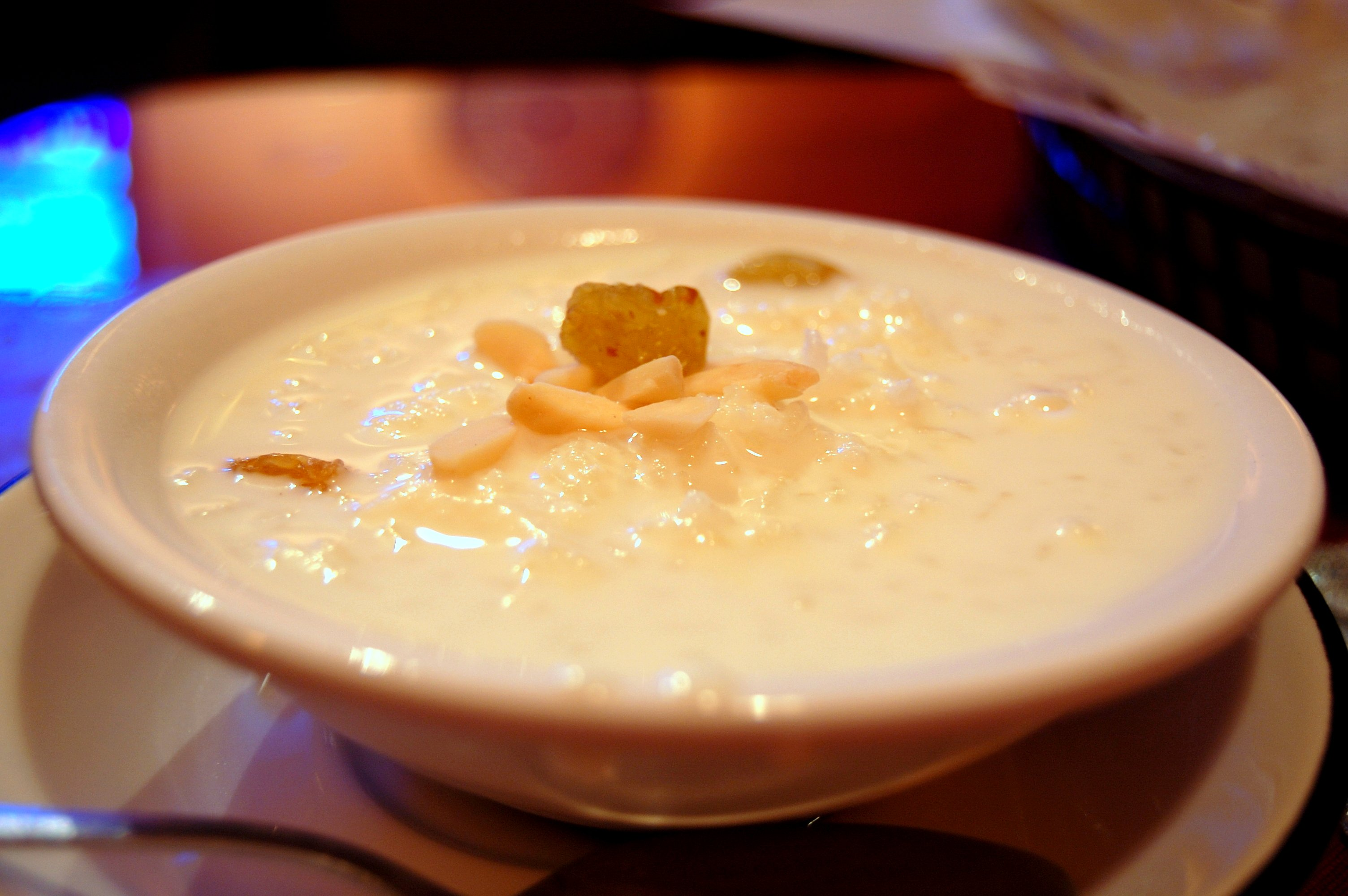
Kheer, a rice pudding

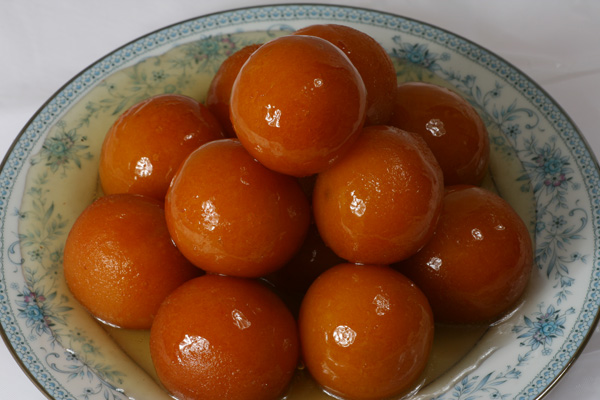
Gulab jamun

== Beverages ==
=== Non-alcoholic ===
Tea is a staple beverage throughout India, since the country is one of the largest producers of tea in the world. The most popular varieties of tea grown in India include Assam, Darjeeling, and Nilgiri. The popular spiced tea drink masala chai is prepared by boiling the tea leaves in a mix of water, milk, and spices such as cardamom, cloves, cinnamon, and ginger. In India, tea is often taken with snacks like biscuits and pakoras.

Coffee is cultivated in India, mainly in the southern states of Karnataka, Kerala, and Tamil Nadu. It is a popular beverage, especially in South India. Indian filter coffee, filter kaapi, is percolated with chicory to give a drink which is "hot, strong, sweet and topped with bubbly froth".

Lassi is a traditional dahi (yogurt)-based drink in India. It is made by blending yogurt with water or milk and spices such as cumin. It can equally be flavoured with sugar, rose water, mango, lemon, strawberry, and saffron. Chaas is another curd-based drink.

Sharbat is a sweet cold beverage prepared from fruits or flower petals. It can be served in concentrated form and eaten with a spoon, or diluted with water to create a drink. Popular sharbats are made from plants such as rose, sandalwood, bel, gurhal (hibiscus), lemon, orange, pineapple, sarsaparilla and phalsa (Grewia asiatica). In Ayurveda, sharbats are believed to hold medicinal value.

Thandai is a cold drink prepared with a mixture of almonds, fennel seeds, watermelon kernels, rose petals, pepper, poppy seeds, cannabis, cardamom, saffron, milk and sugar. It is native to India and is associated with the Holi festival.

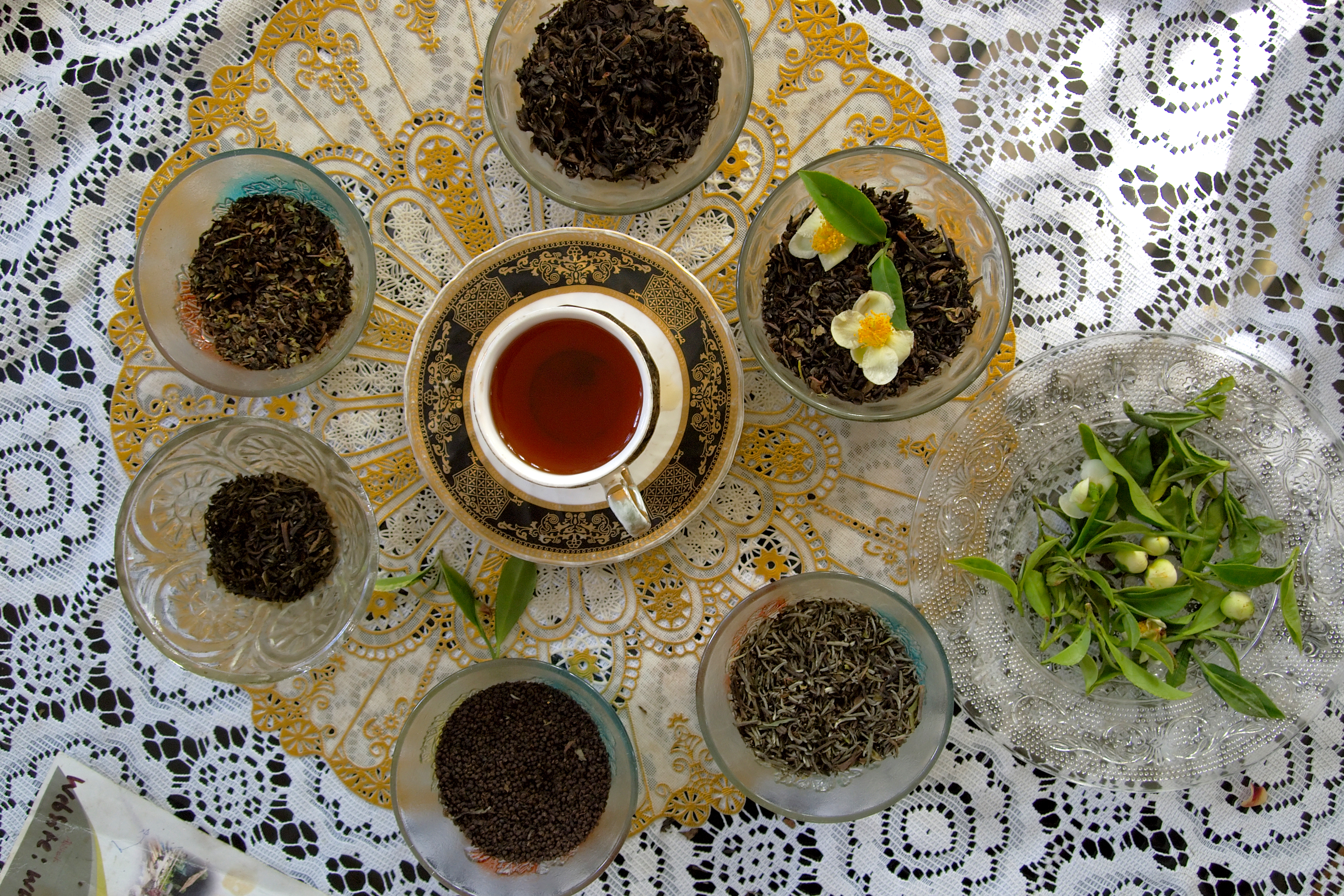
Darjeeling tea in varieties.

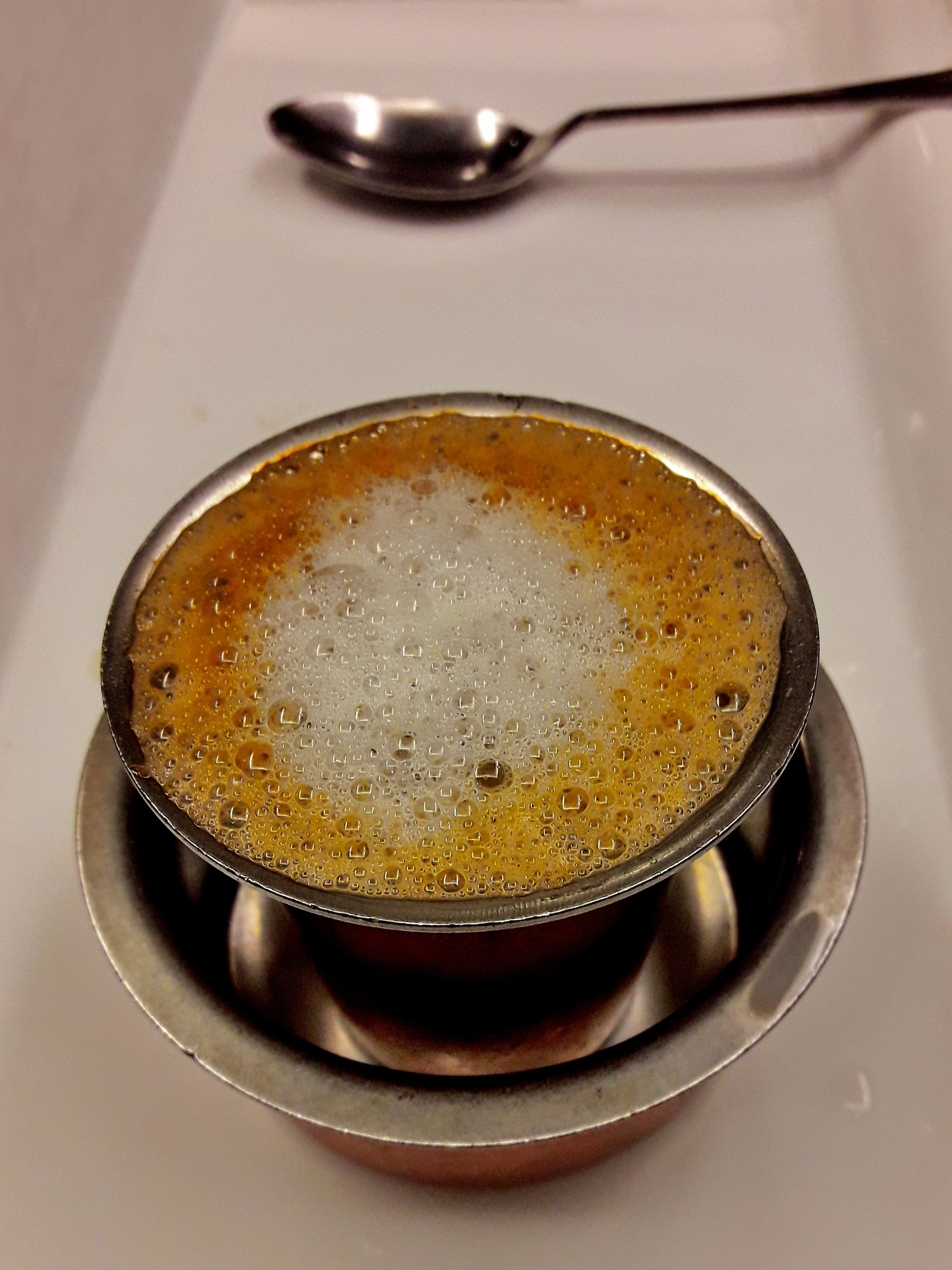
Indian filter coffee is popular in Southern India.

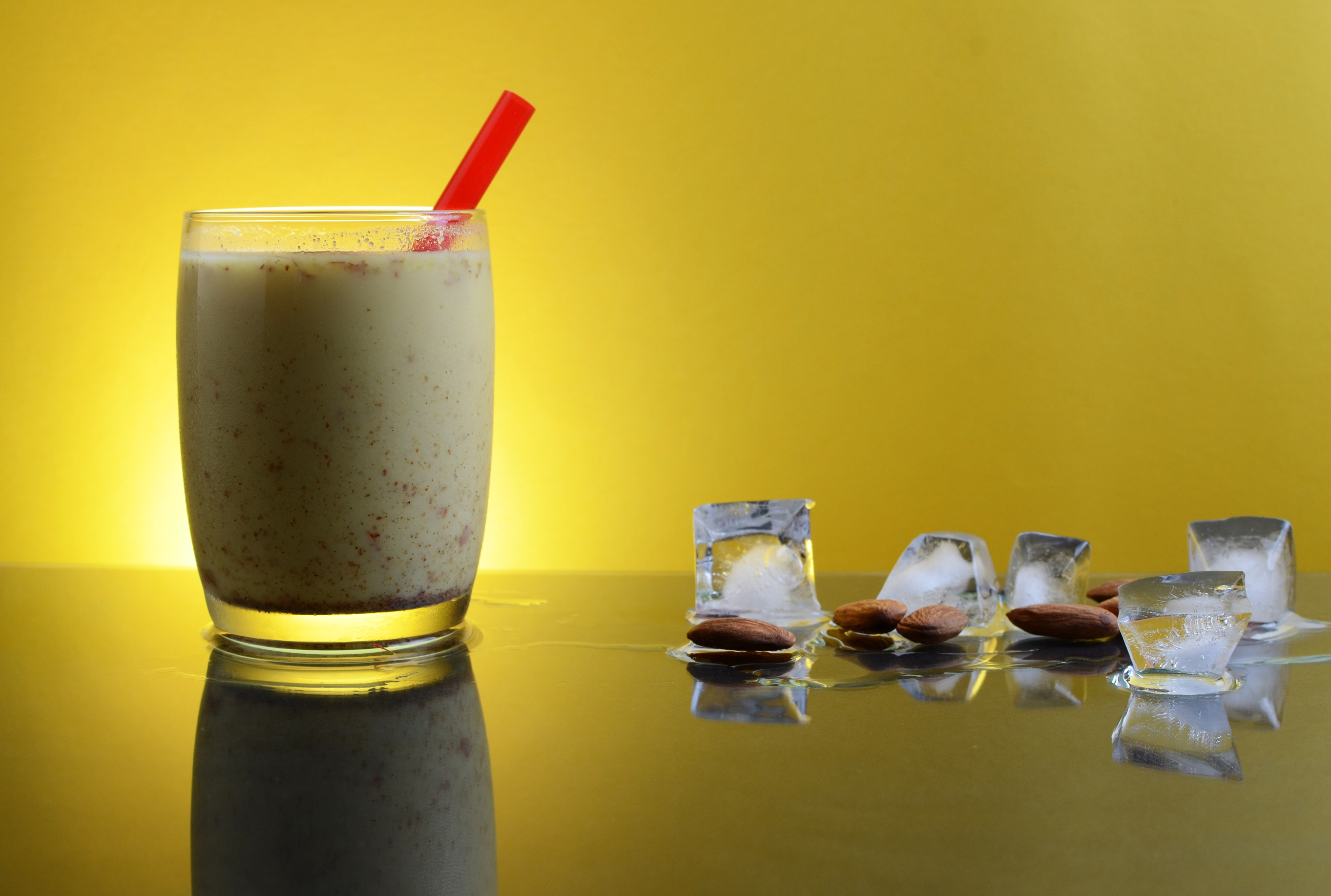
Badam milk

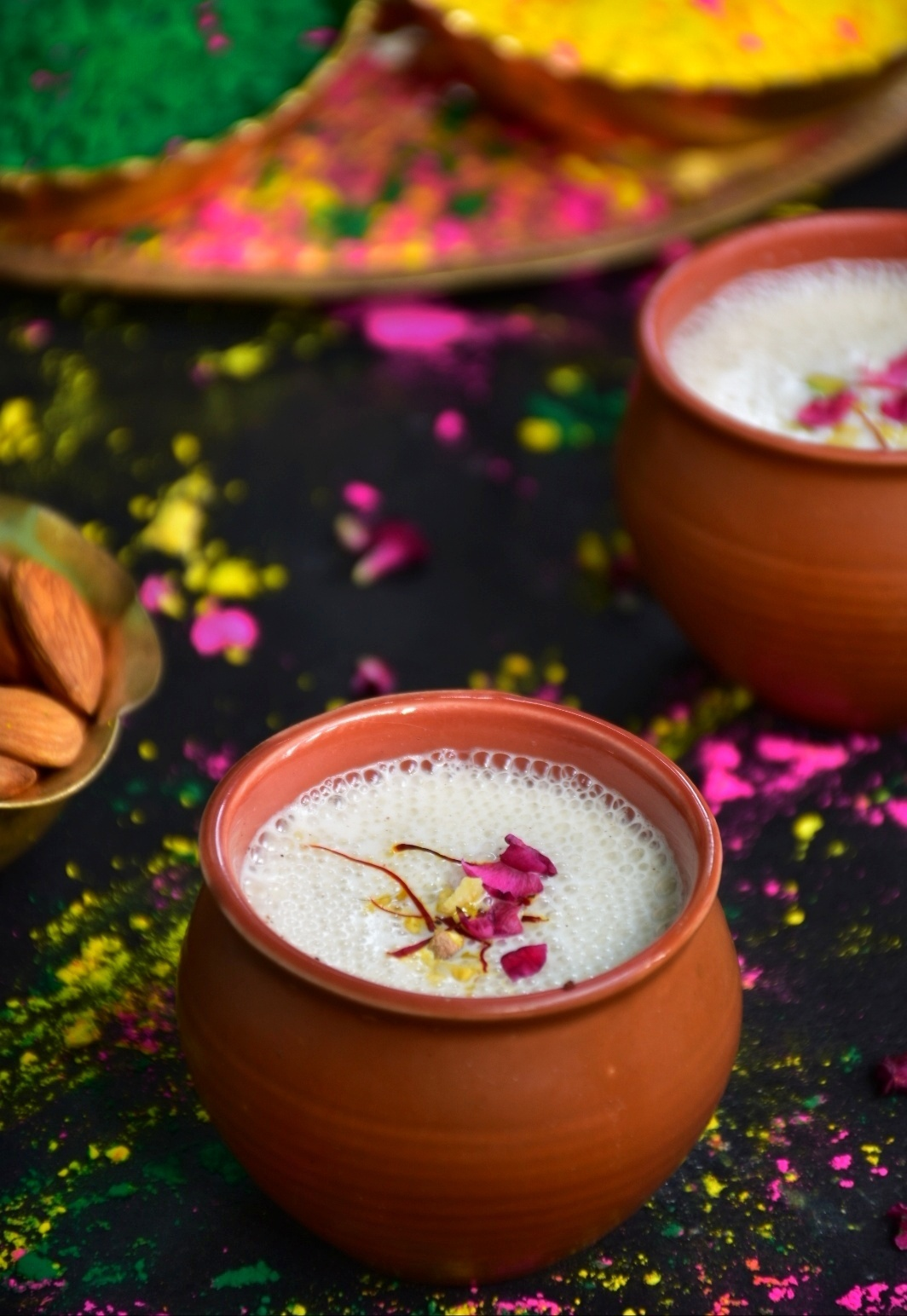
Holi Special Chilled Thandai

=== Alcoholic ===
==== Beer ====
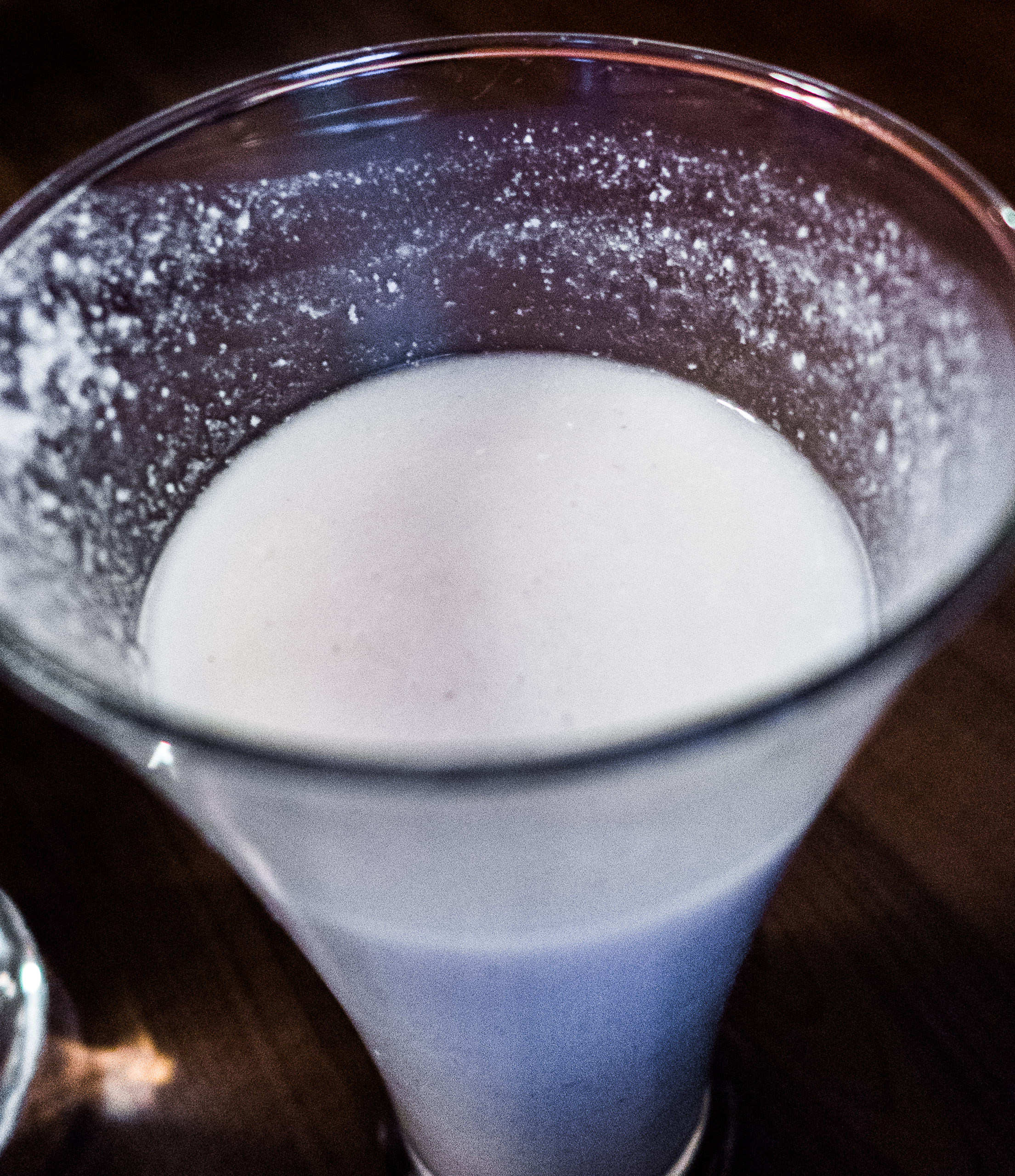
Chhaang brewed from rice

Most beer in India consists of lagers (4.8 percent alcohol) or strong lagers (8.9 percent). Production exceeded 170 million cases during the 2008–2009 financial year. Chhaang is a beer brewed from barley, millet, or rice, and consumed by the people of Sikkim and the Darjeeling Himalayan hill region of West Bengal. It is drunk cold or at room temperature in summer, and often hot during cold weather.

==== Others ====
Other popular alcoholic drinks in India include fenny, a Goan liquor made from either coconut or the juice of the cashew apple. The state of Goa has registered for a geographical indicator to allow its fenny distilleries to claim exclusive rights to production of liquor under the name "fenny."

Handia is a rice beer, created by mixing herbs with boiled rice and leaving the mixture to ferment for around a week.

Palm wine, locally known as neera, kallu, or toddy, is a sap extracted from inflorescences of various species of toddy palms.

== Eating habits ==
Indians consider a healthy breakfast important. They often drink tea or coffee with breakfast, though food preferences vary regionally. North Indian people prefer roti, parathas, and a vegetable dish accompanied by achar (a pickle) and some curd. People of Gujarat prefer dhokla and milk, while south Indians prefer idli and dosa, generally accompanied by sambhar or sagu and various chutneys.

Traditional lunch in India usually consists of a main dish of rice in the south and the east, and whole-wheat rotis in the north. It typically includes two or three kinds of vegetables, and sometimes items such as kulcha, naan, or parathas. Paan (stuffed, spiced and folded betel leaves) which aids digestion is often eaten after lunch and dinner in many parts of India. Indian families often gather for "evening snack time", similar to tea time to talk and have tea and snacks such as samosas. Dinner is considered the main meal of the day.

== Dietary practices ==
In India people often follow dietary practices based on their religious beliefs. Many Hindu communities consider beef taboo since they believe that Hindu scriptures condemn cow slaughter. Cow slaughter has been banned in many states of India. This taboo on beef is defied by the marginalised Dalit Hindu castes, substantially covered in their literature and often displayed at their food festivals. As Dalit communities were restricted to living outside the village in mostly barren lands, with reduced resources to cultivate their food, discarded cows were essential traditional food that nourished them. Dalit cuisine included dishes made with coagulated beef blood, preserved meat, and intestines. During the independence era, and after, the imposition of beef restrictions on Dalit communities was part of efforts to bring them under a unified nationalist identity.

Vaishnavites are strict lacto-vegetarians due to an emphasis on Ahimsa, and they avoid garlic and onions. Jains too are strict lacto-vegetarians; Jain vegetarianism excludes all root vegetables such as carrots and potatoes.

Indian Muslims do not eat pork, but they do eat buffalo and beef. In some North-Eastern regions, dog meat is occasionally consumed by some communities. This has been a constant source of stereotyping and racial discrimination against people from the region. Indian dietary practices are closely related to caste discrimination, rooted in notions of pollution and filth. Dalit and tribal accounts of cooking and eating record casteist-racist treatment accorded to Dalit and tribal culinary practices. Brahmanical food practices dictate which food is clean and unclean based on their sensorial experiences.

The World Wildlife Fund's 2024 Living Planet Report described India's food consumption pattern as the most sustainable among the big economies (G20 countries).

== See also ==
- Buddhist vegetarianism
- Diet in Hinduism
- Diet in Sikhism
- Jain vegetarianism
- Indian bread
- Indian tea culture
- List of Indian pickles
- List of snack foods from the Indian subcontinent
- List of Indian soups and stews
- List of plants used in Indian cuisine
- South Asian cuisine
- South Asian pickle

== Sources ==
- Achaya, K. T. (1998) [1994]. Indian Food: A Historical Companion (Paperback ed.). Delhi: Oxford University Press.
- Pat Chapman. India: Food & Cooking, New Holland, London – ISBN 978-1-84537-619-2 (2007)
- Collingham, Lizzie (2007). Curry: A tale of cooks and conquerors. Oxford University Press.
- Dalal, Tarla (2010). Faraal Foods for fasting days. Mumbai: Sanjay and Co. ISBN 9789380392028.
- Davidson, Alan (2014). Jaine, Tom (ed.). The Oxford Companion to Food (3rd ed.). Oxford University Press. ISBN 978-0-19-967733-7.
- Pinkney, Andrea Marion (2018). "Prasāda". Brill's Encyclopedia of Hinduism Online. Brill Publishers. doi:10.1163/2212-5019_BEH_COM_000342.
- Sen, Colleen Taylor (2016) [2015]. Feasts and Fasts: A History of Food in India. Speaking Tiger Books. ISBN 978-9385755347.
