= Panipuri =

Indian street food

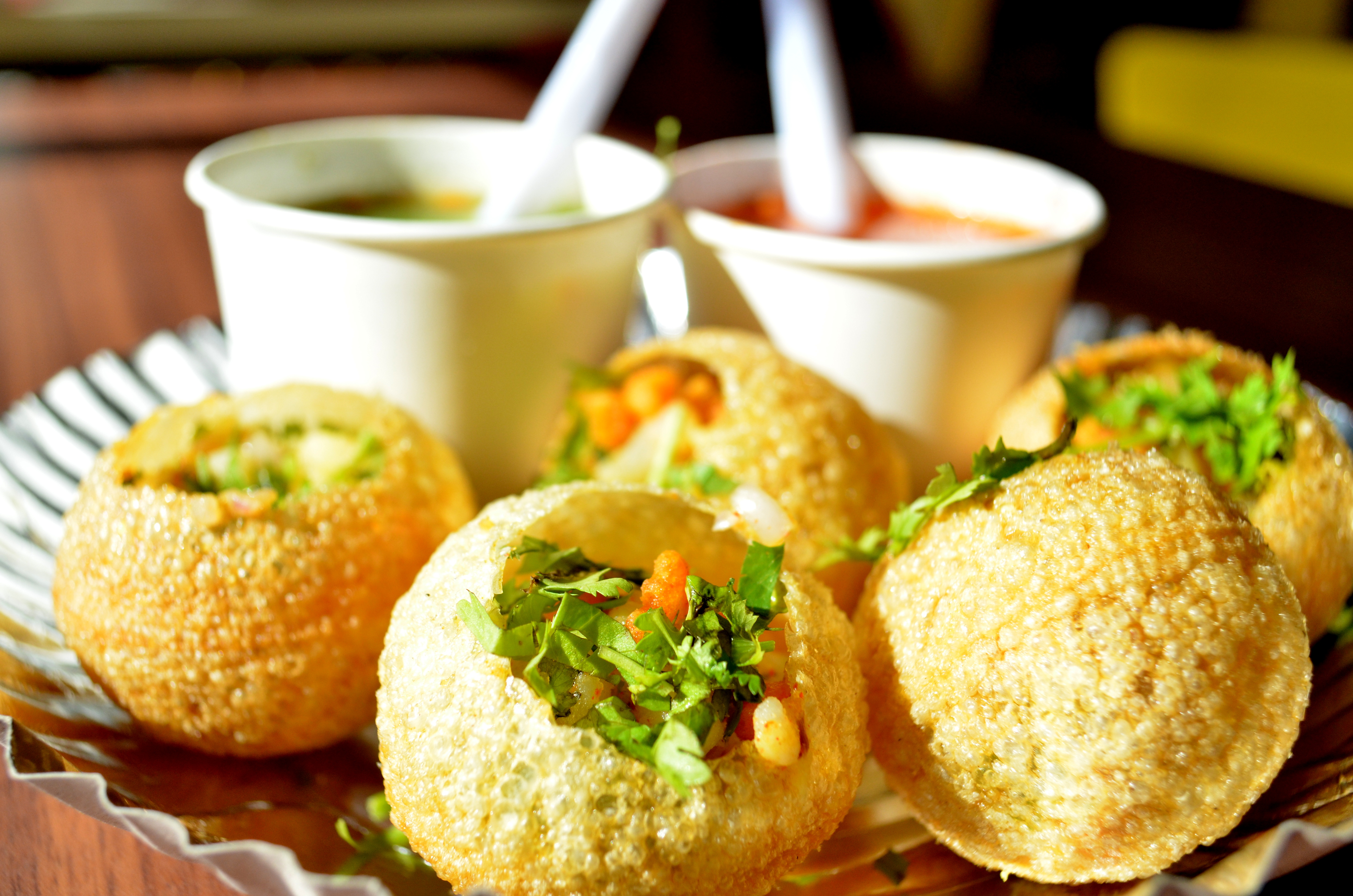
- Type: Chaat
- Region or state: Indian subcontinent, particularly North India
- Main ingredients: Puri (atta or semolina flour), chickpea, potatoes, coriander leaf water, tamarind water
- Variations: Sev puri, dahi puri, several regional variations

Panipuri (also known by other names, including phuchka and golgappa) is a snack associated with the cuisines of the Indian subcontinent consisting of a deep-fried spherical puri shell, hollowed out for a filling and dipped in flavoured waters. Panipuri is primarily a street food and is part of the chaat category of light snacks. It is commonly filled with some combination of potatoes, chickpeas, spices, and chutney. The flavoured waters, or pani, are typically a spicy coriander leaf or mint chutney called teekha pani and a sweet tamarind chutney called meetha pani. A few centimetres in diameter, it is a finger food eaten in one bite. Panipuri is the most common street food in the Indian subcontinent, and it is popular across the region, in both urban and rural areas.

Several variations exist, using different ingredients in the filling, waters, and dough. Cities have local variations, such as Delhi-style golgappe, which is filled with both potatoes and black chickpeas; Kolkata-style phuchka, which uses mashed potatoes and has a sour and citrusy, rather than sweet, flavour; and Mumbai-style panipuri, which uses ragda. In Bangladesh, phuchka uses a filling of potato-based chotpoti and is garnished with eggs. In Uttar Pradesh, where the dish is known as pani ke batashe, many flavours of pani are used. Primarily associated with North India, panipuri is also popular in South India, sometimes altered for regional tastes. Vendors of the dish are predominantly from North India.

The origin of panipuri is unknown. The dish spread across India in the 20th century, resulting in variations using local ingredients. Beginning in the 1990s, chefs developed non-traditional variations, including vodka panipuri and panipuri served with shot glasses. Panipuri inspired trends in the 2020s, when the COVID-19 pandemic inspired people to make panipuri at home, and vendors went viral for serving non-traditional versions. As a result of migration from the Indian subcontinent, panipuri is served at restaurants globally.

== Names ==
Approximate distribution of various terms for panipuri

The Hindi word pani means 'water', referring to the watery chutneys used in the dish, and puri refers to rounds of deep-fried dough. The term panipuri (Note: Or pani puri; Hindi pronunciation: [paːniːpuːɾiː]) is used in most parts of India, including Mumbai and the rest of Maharashtra, Gujarat, Karnataka, Madhya Pradesh, and Tamil Nadu, as well as in Nepal. It is also the most common term in other parts of the world that are home to the Indian diaspora.

The terms golgappa (Note: Hindi pronunciation: [ɡoːlɡəpːaː]; plural golgappe) and phuchka (Note: Also spelt fuchka, puchka, or fuska; Bengali pronunciation: [pʰʊtʃkaː]) have also entered English usage. Phuchka is an onomatopoeia for the sound of eating the food. It is used in Bangladesh, Nepal, and the Indian states of Jharkhand, Bihar, Assam, and West Bengal, including in Kolkata. According to The Business Standard, this term originated in Assam. The dish is called golgappa in Delhi and surrounding parts of North India, including Madhya Pradesh, Haryana, parts of Uttar Pradesh, Punjab, Himachal Pradesh, and Jammu and Kashmir.

Variations are known by many other regional names in the Indian subcontinent. In Rajasthan, parts of Haryana, and Uttar Pradesh, the term is pani ke batashe (Note: Also spelt patashe), meaning 'spherical snacks with water'. In Chhattisgarh, southern Jharkhand, parts of Odisha, and Telangana (including Hyderabad), it is called gup chup, which may be an onomatopoeia. The term phulki is used in Nepal, Eastern Uttar Pradesh, and Gujarat, and pakodi (Note: Not related to pakoda) is used in Madhya Pradesh and inland Gujarat. The term padaka is specific to Aligarh, Uttar Pradesh. The translation water balls is sometimes used in Britain.

== Preparation and serving ==
=== Ingredients and preparation ===
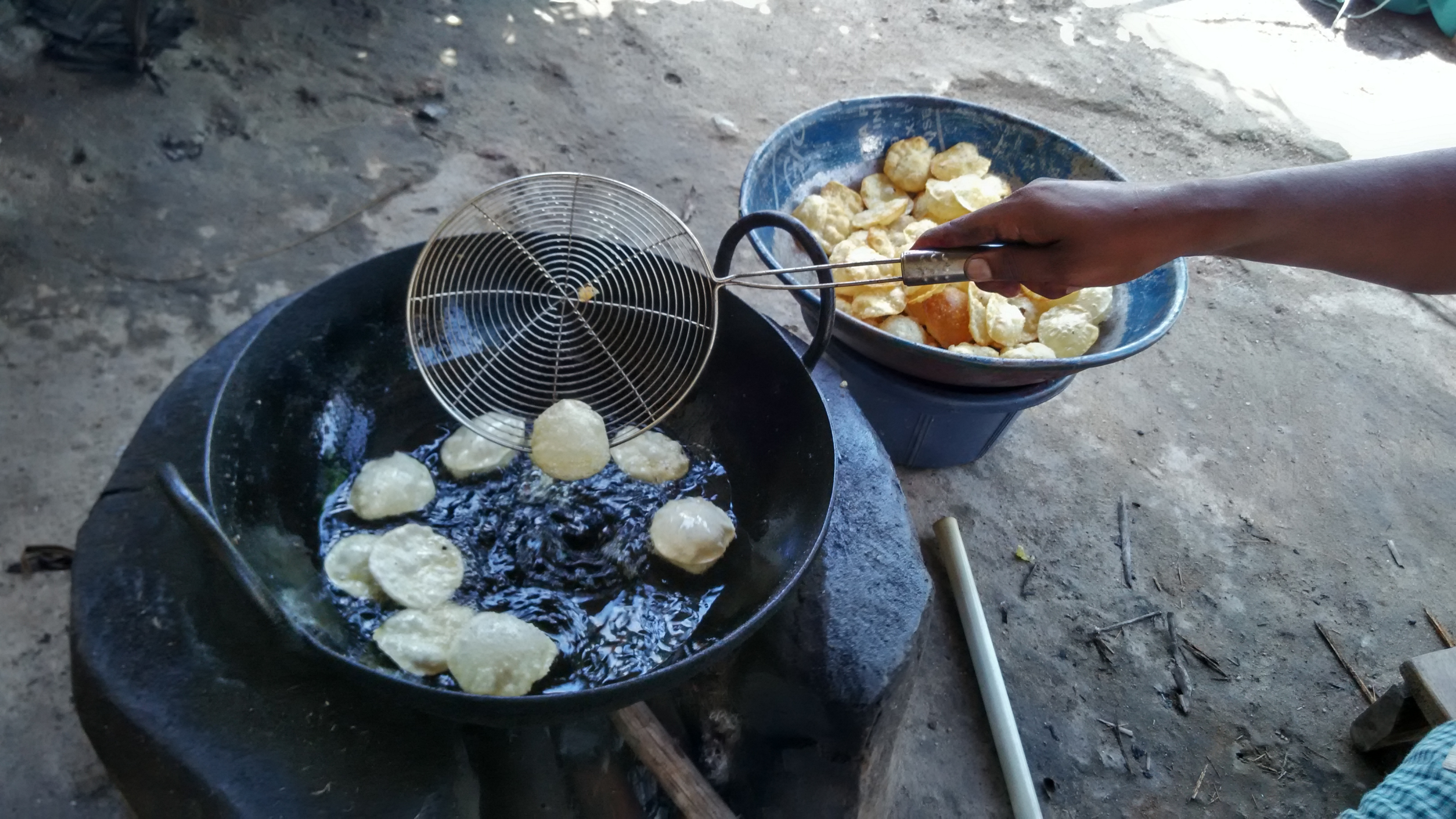
Panipuri is made from small puris, which are made of circles of dough that inflate while frying.

Panipuri is based on puri, a fried wheat flatbread. The puri used in panipuri is made using a thin circle of dough, about 3 to 6 centimetres (1.2 to 2.4 in) in diameter, which inflates during frying to form a hollow spherical shell that holds its shape. It is crispier than regular puri, which is achieved by using oil instead of water in the dough, limiting gluten formation. The puri itself may be referred to as a pani puri, golgappa puri, or phuchka puri.

Each puri is punctured with a finger, then filled, often with potatoes or chickpeas, along with chutneys. The filled puri is then quickly dipped in watered-down chutneys, known as pani, which are often chilled. Panipuri is a finger food and is eaten in one bite; taking multiple bites is seen as improper.

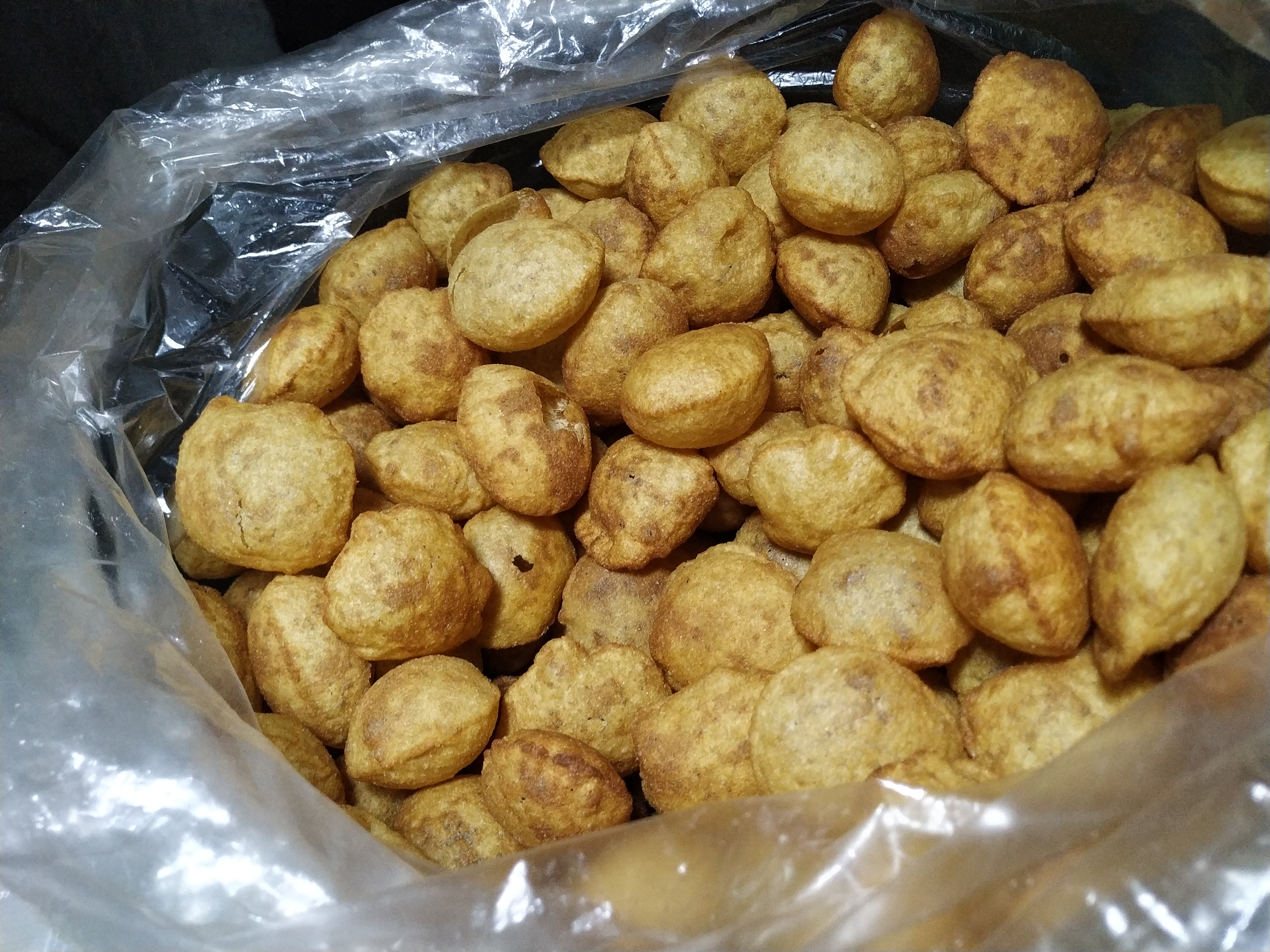
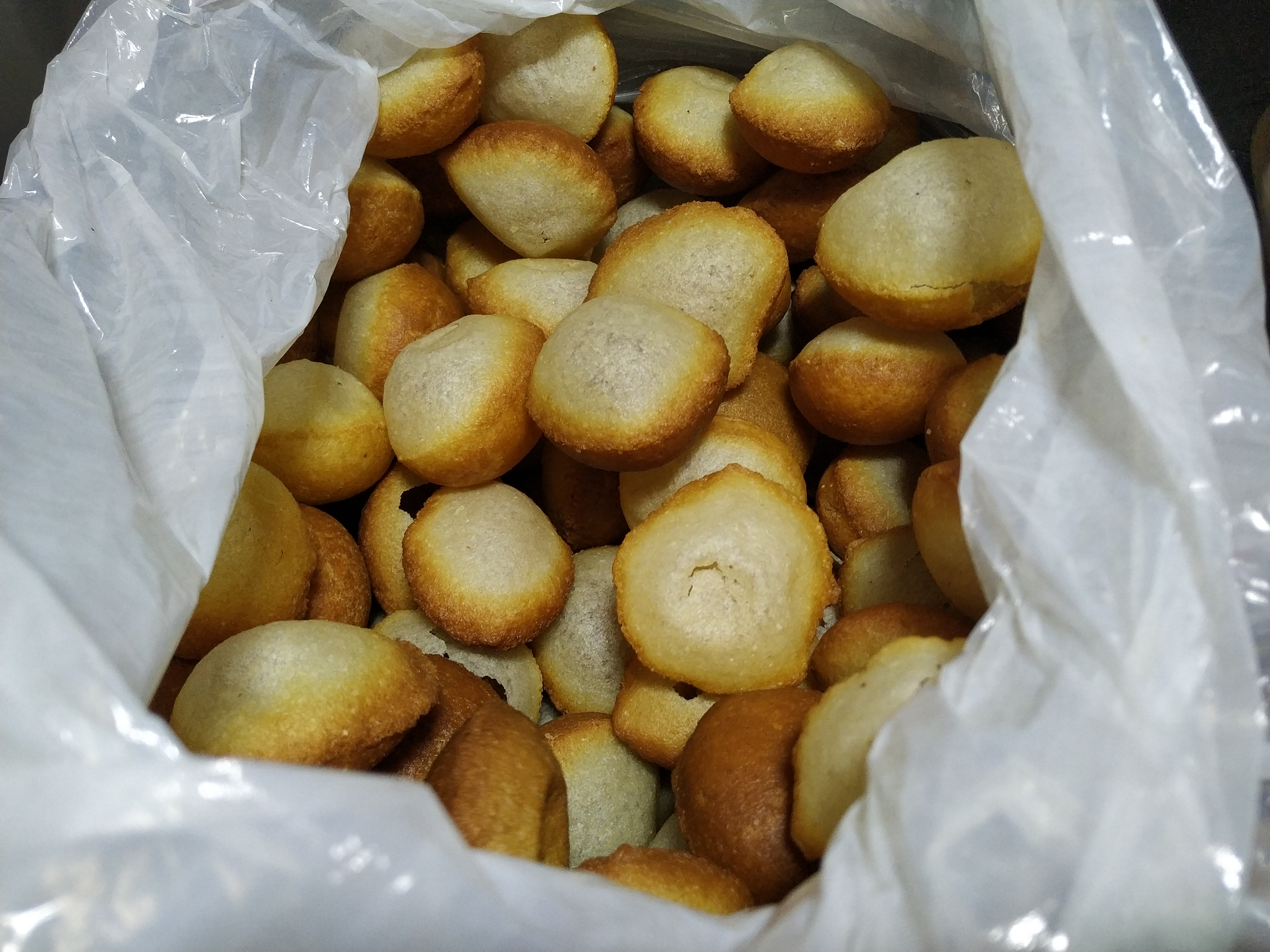
Puri made of wheat flour (left) and semolina (right), to be used in panipuri

Regional variations differ based on ingredients in filling or the pani, as well as the type of flour used in the puri. The common feature of all variations is the puri base. The puri is most commonly made of semolina flour, though it may also be made of wheat flours, including maida and atta, or with a mix of semolina and atta. The use of atta is more traditional, but many producers favour semolina for its longer shelf life. Puris using semolina are also thicker and denser, making them crunchier and less prone to breaking from the water.

The filling may contain mashed potato, chopped onion, peas, bean sprouts, chilli powder, and chaat masala, sometimes with the addition of mint or tamarind chutney. The panis are typically a spicy green sauce known as teekha pani (lit. 'spicy water'), containing herbs like mint or coriander, along with a red sauce known meetha pani (lit. 'sweet water') made of tamarind, similar to saunth chutney. Different flavours of pani are used in some places, including lemon or asafoetida. The waters can include a garnishing of boondi, made of fried chickpea flour, or spices such as star anise. Many mass-produced panipuris use cheaper ingredients for pani, such as citric acid.

It is classified as a chaat, a broad category of small snacks combining multiple ingredients, which are consumed in the early evening and typically as street food. The hollow puris used in panipuri are also used in variations such as sev puri, in which the potato filling is topped with sev (crunchy strands of chickpea flour); dahi puri, which adds dahi (yoghurt) to the potato filling; and pakodi puri, filled with small pakodas. A deflated version of the puri is used for papri chaat and bhel puri.

Panipuri combines sweet and sour flavours, and the astringency and cooling of tamarind may balance against spiciness. There is also a contrast between the crispy exterior and the soft filling. The flavour profile of panipuri—combining sourness, saltiness, and heat—is similar to other chaats and other Indian street foods.

=== Serving ===
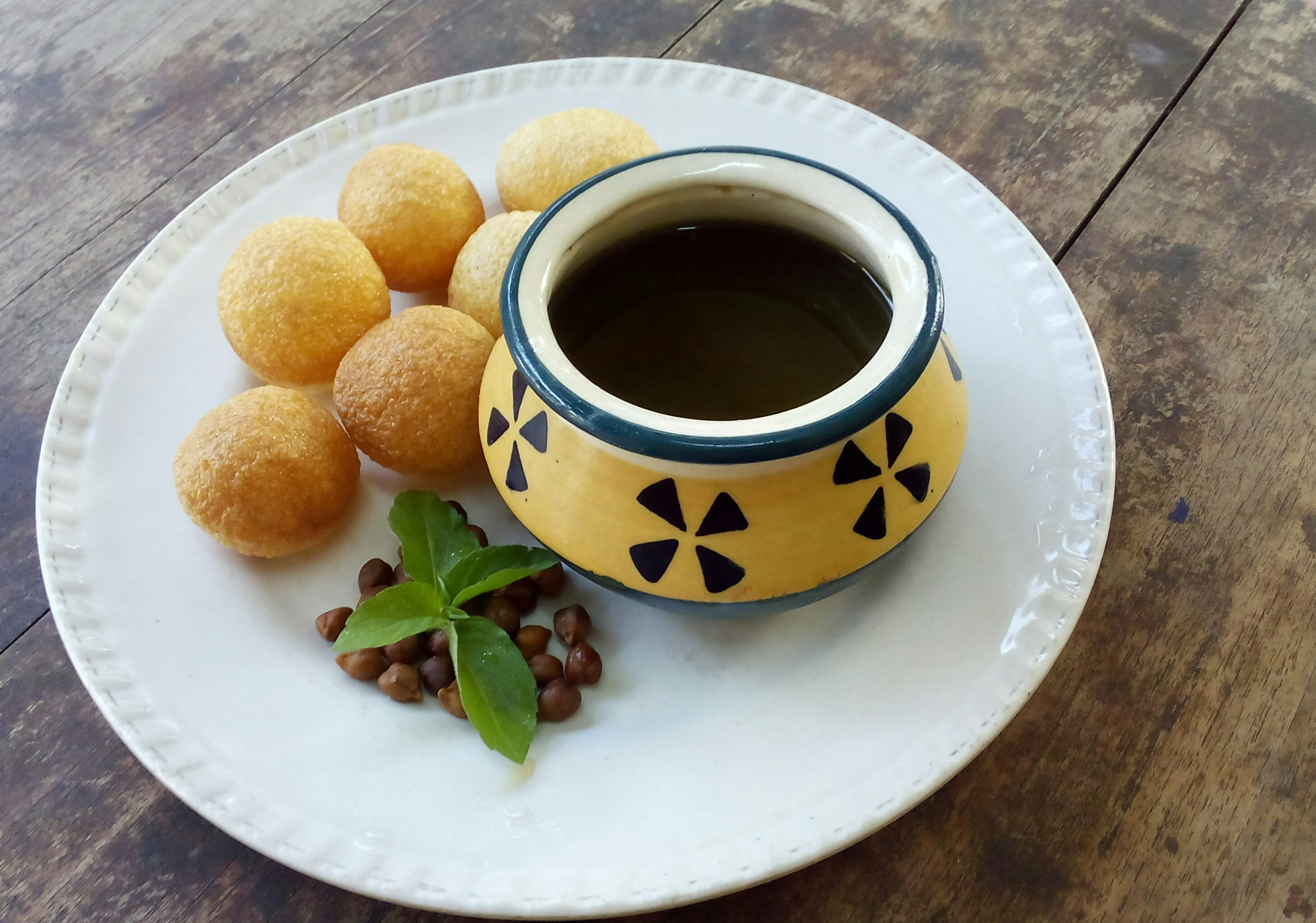
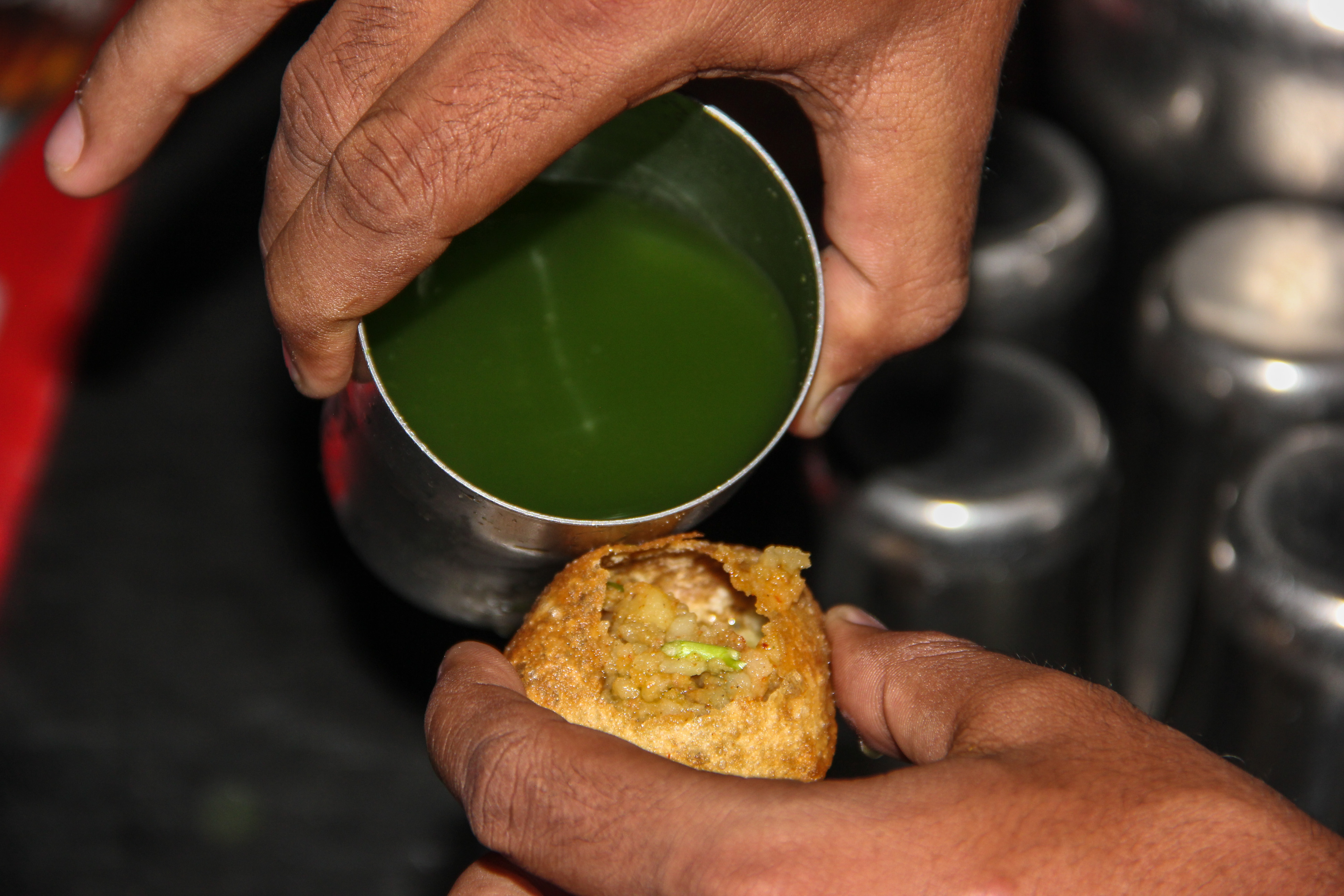
Panipuri served with meetha pani (left) and teekha pani (right)

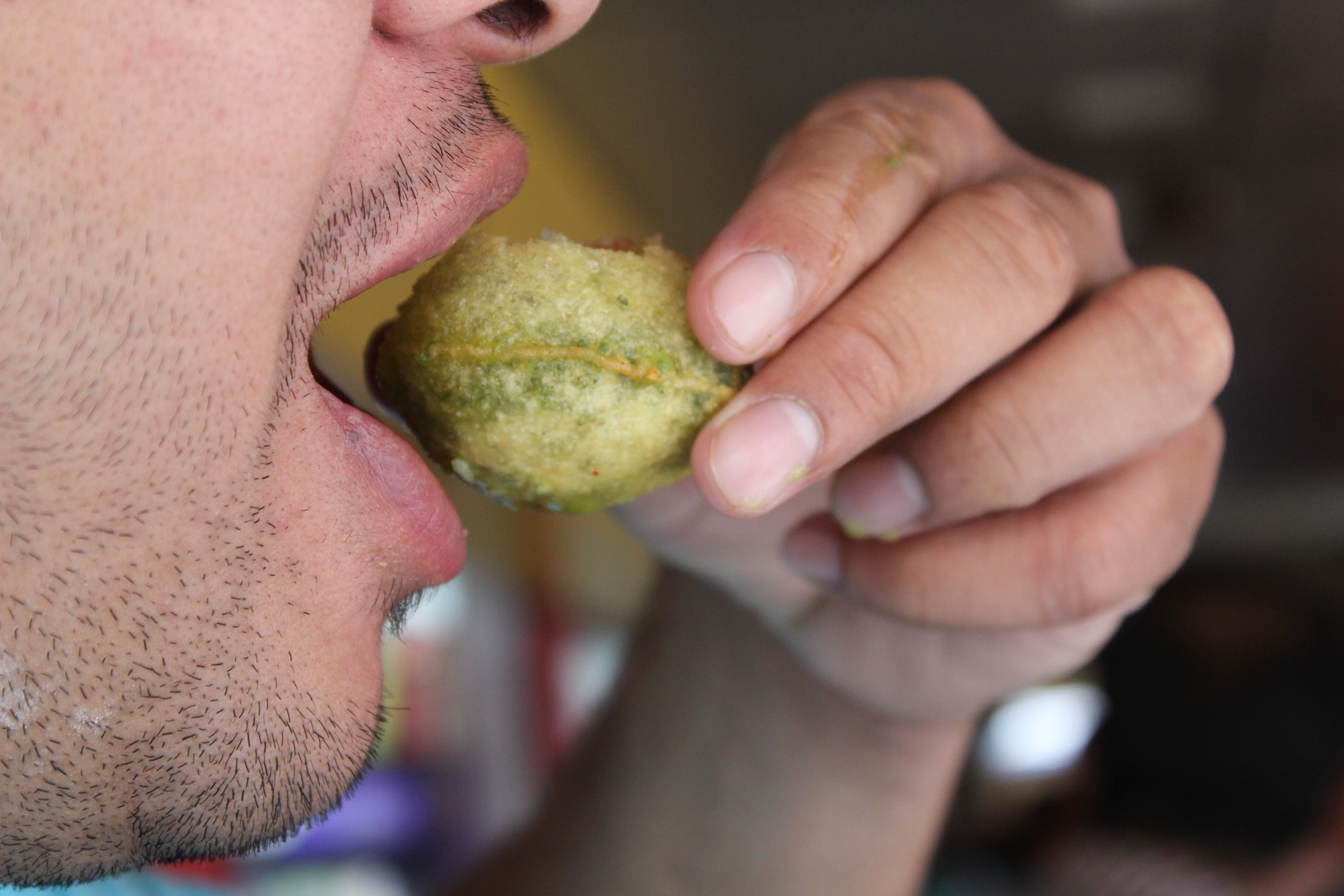
Panipuri is eaten by hand in one bite.

Panipuri is typically served by street food vendors, though versions also exist at restaurants. Street vendors of the dish, known as panipuri wallas, each use their own recipes. They prepare panipuri with tweaks according to each customer's order, such as using different levels of spiciness. Panipuri is served one at a time and may be assembled by the vendor or the customer; culinary presenter Padma Lakshmi wrote in her 2016 memoir, "Nowadays, you’re often presented with the components and required to assemble each bite yourself ... Pani puri is never as good as when a master makes it." Some vendors serve panipuri directly from their hands to the hands of the customer, which is not done with other street foods, while some vendors use leaf plates. People consume panipuri quickly—to prevent it from becoming soggy—and then leave, unlike with other street foods. A round of panipuris may end with one served without the water, which is known as dry or sookha.

When served at restaurants, the dish may be served with the filling on the side, for the customer to add, or already filled in the puri, though the pani is always added after serving. As a street food, panipuri is rarely eaten at home. However, among the Marwari people, panipuri and other chaats may also be homemade.

Panipuri is a particularly popular snack in the summer. As a light snack, it is popular in the evening. It is also sometimes served as wedding food. According to cultural scholar Bhaskar Mukhopadhyay, panipuri is an example of a food that is eaten for fun rather than practical value.

=== Safety ===
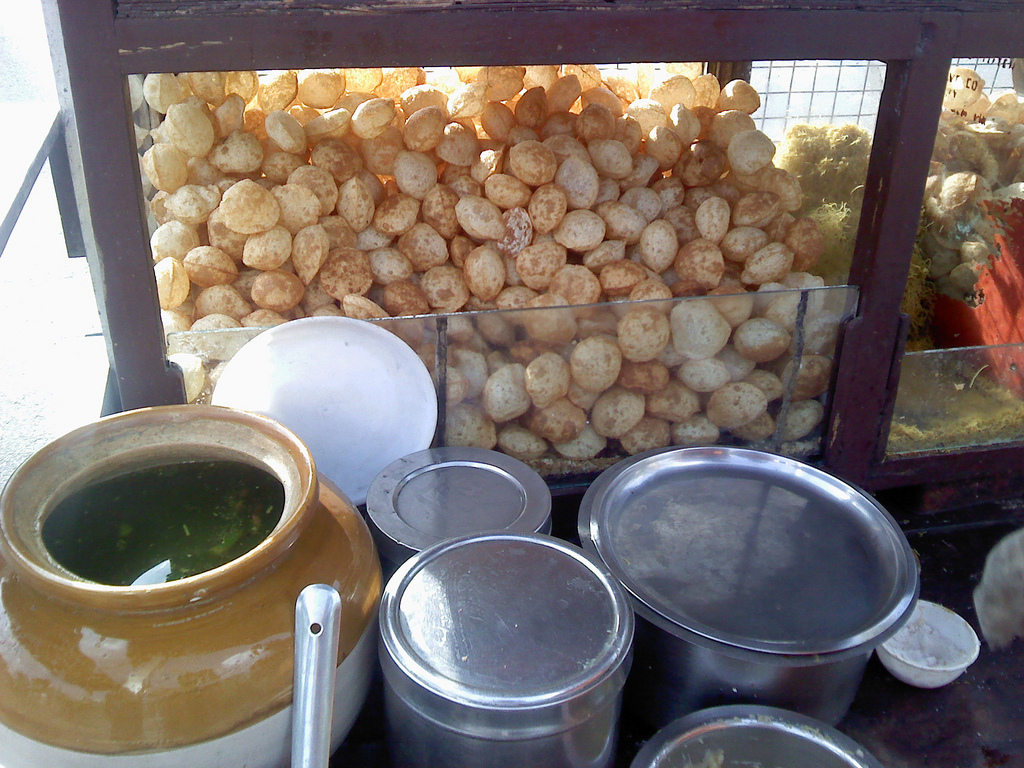
Uncovered containers used for panipuri pose a health risk.

As panipuri is a popular street food, its safety has been seen as a public health issue. Panipuri is a perishable product whose ingredients may get contaminated with bacteria. The risk of foodborne illness is caused by poor hygiene during preparation and serving as well as contamination of water or raw vegetables as these are not cooked before consumption. Hygienic risks occur as vendors often store the water used for panipuri in open containers and serve the dish by hand. Studies analysing panipuri served by street vendors have found bacteria such as E. coli, Staphylococcus, Salmonella, and Listeria, as well as fungal contaminants. A 2024 analysis by the Food Safety and Standards Authority of India found that 22% of samples of panipuri in Karnataka were below standards due to substances classified as unsafe or carcinogenic. The same year, this agency found 16% of samples in the city of Chennai to be unsafe for consumption. To avoid health risks, many street vendors use mineral water, and the fast food chain Haldiram's serves the dish using a sealed bag of puris.

== Variations ==
=== Regional variations ===
==== Eastern Indian subcontinent ====
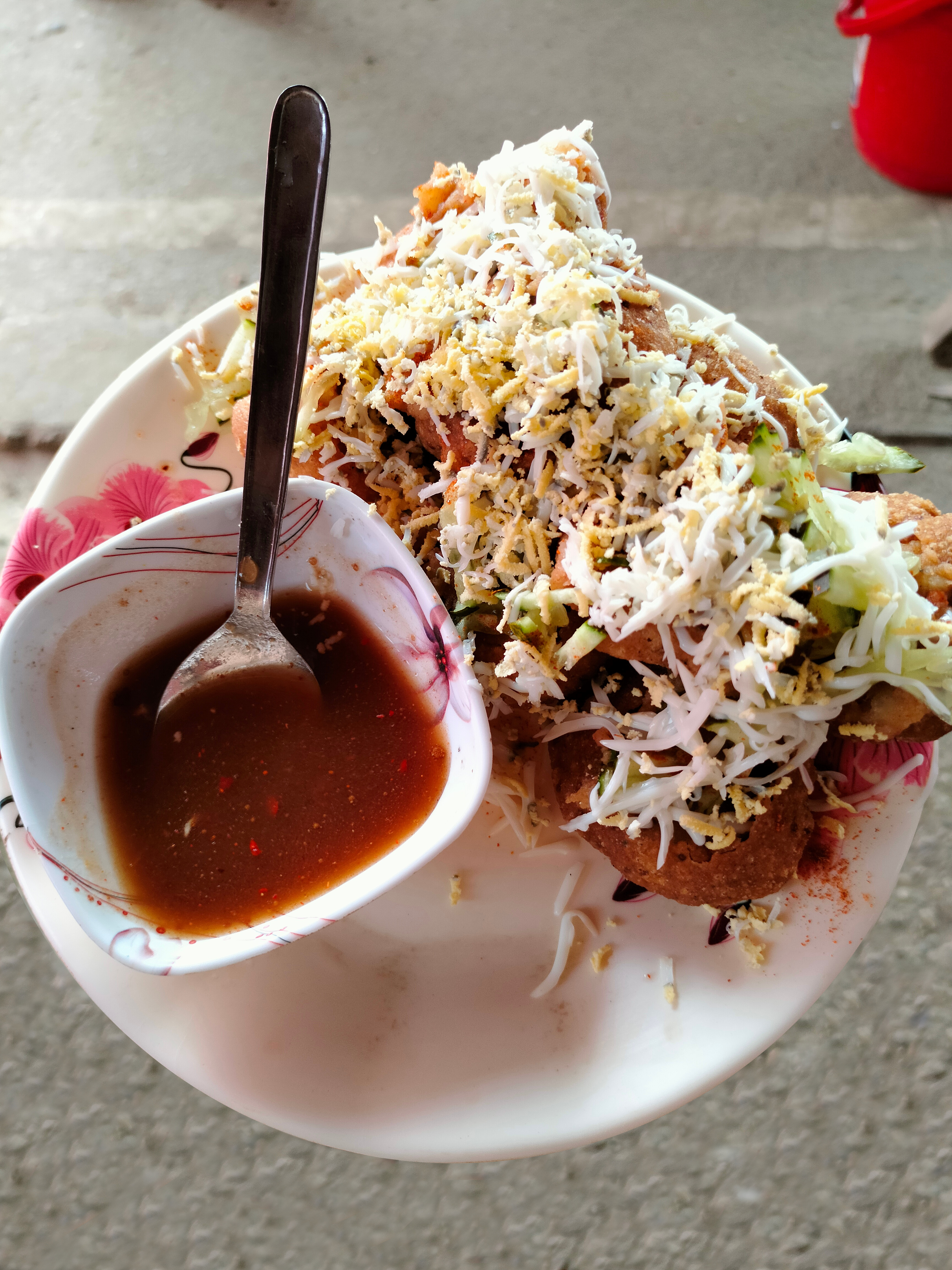
Bangladeshi phuchka is filled with chotpoti and topped with shredded eggs.

The phuchka made in the eastern Indian subcontinent is distinct from panipuri as the puris are made of atta, the green water is especially spicy, and the tamarind water is sour rather than sweet. The latter is known in Bengali as tok jol ('sour water'). The typical filling uses mashed potatoes or boiled Bengal gram chickpeas. In West Bengal, phuchka is often flavoured with gondhoraj lime, which gives Kolkata-style phuchka its distinctive flavour. This style is filled with mashed potatoes, green chilli, and spices. They usually do not use chickpeas, but often use white peas instead. The atta puris are slightly larger and much thinner than most panipuris. According to chef Vikramjeet Roy, many Kolkatans prefer for the snack to be more fragile. Some vendors in Kolkata serve a sweet pani in addition to the sour pani. Doi phuchka is a variation of phuchka that contains dahi, making it similar to the dahi puri of Mumbai.

In Bangladesh, phuchka is filled with chotpoti, containing potatoes and onions, and topped with shredded eggs. It is served with tamarind water. Phuchka and panipuri are distinct items in Bangladesh, with the latter using smaller puris and a filling of potatoes, chickpeas, and peas; Bangladeshi doi phuchka uses the same filling, topped with dahi, beets, and sev, rather than flavoured waters. Bhelpuri, in Bangladesh, is a variant of panipuri that uses larger puris, topped with potato, tomato, and cucumber.

==== North India ====
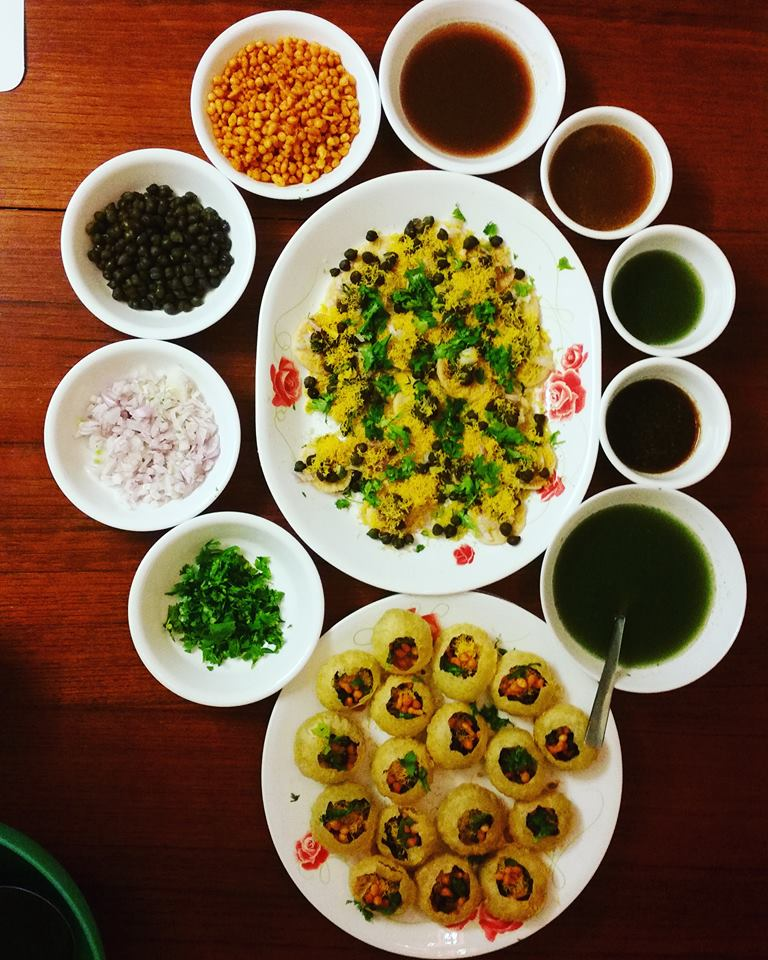
Uttar Pradeshi pani ke batashe uses potatoes and chickpeas. In Lucknow, it sometimes has five sauces.

A spiced filling of potatoes and black chickpeas is used in both the golgappa of Delhi and pani ke batashe from in and around Uttar Pradesh. Delhi golgappe use thicker and crispier puris than the ones used elsewhere. Both atta and semolina are used in the city, though semolina is more common. Delhi-style golgappe use a green water made with both mint and coriander and a red water made with less tamarind than usual and without star anise. A form of golgappa in Delhi, historically served at khomcha stalls, uses a sour and spicy water known as hara pani (lit. 'green water'), which is similar to jal-jeera and consists of amchoor spiced with asafoetida, peeli mirch, cumin, and salt.

Pani ke batashe use a similar filling to Delhi golgappe, with the optional addition of saunth. It is distinguished by the spices in the pani, with the sourness of the tamarind pani more closely resembling Kolkata phuchka. Pani ke batashe are usually made of dried mango; other flavours include tamarind, lemon, cumin, dates, and asafoetida. At restaurants in the Hazratganj neighbourhood of Lucknow, Uttar Pradesh, pani ke batashe is served with five flavours of pani and is thus called paanch swaad ke batashe (with paanch swaad meaning 'five flavours'). Dahi-saunth ke batashe, a version similar to dahi puri, includes chopped potatoes and spices. Historically, atta puris were popular in Lucknow, while semolina puris were popular in Agra, where they had a wide shape, and in Delhi, where they were more round.

==== Western India and South India ====
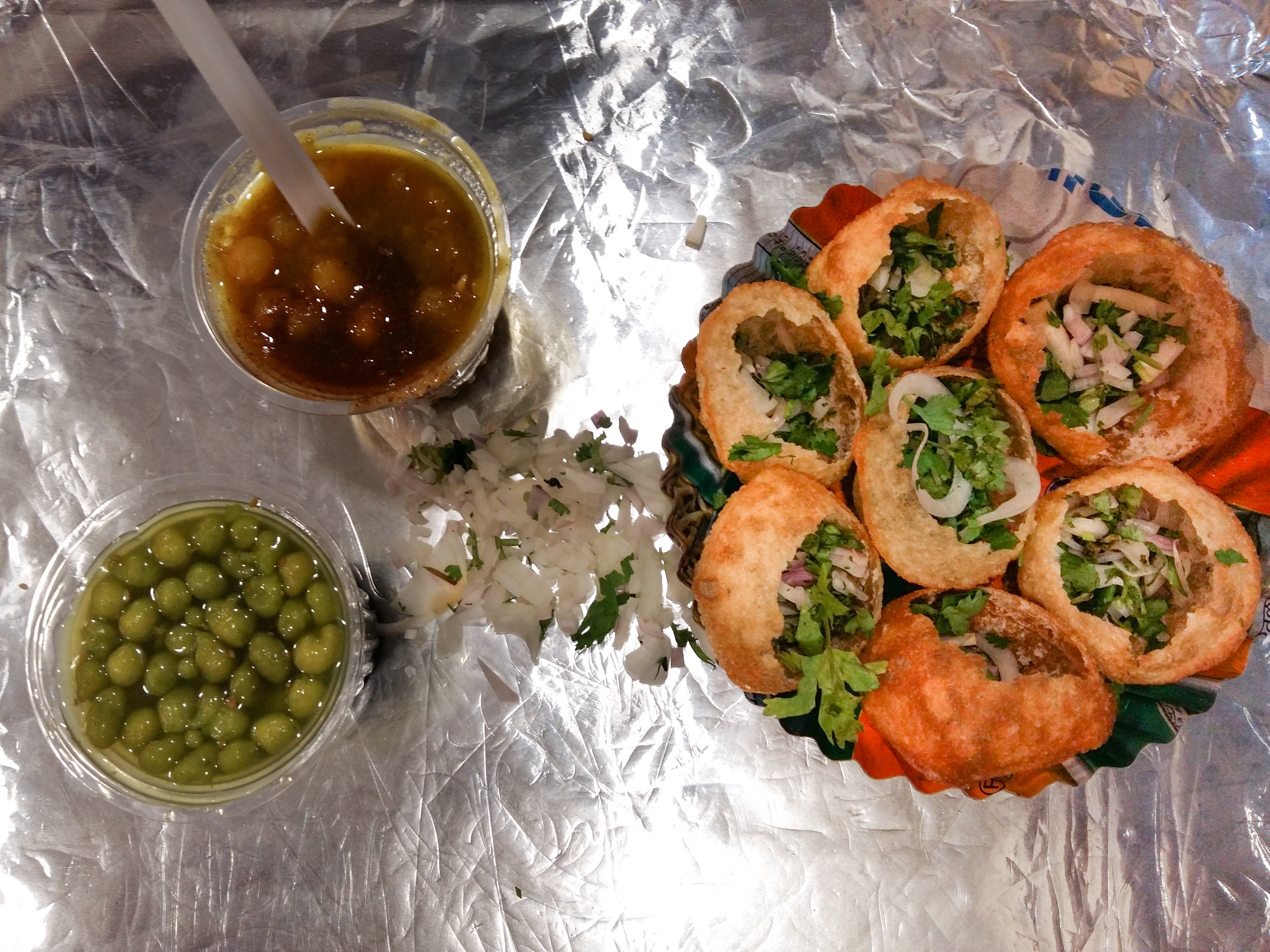
Mumbai panipuri often uses ragda.

Mumbai-style panipuri is typically filled with ragda, made from mashed white peas, and served with tamarind and mint waters. Bean sprouts and boiled potatoes are also common ingredients in Mumbai. In Gujarat, the traditional filling for panipuri is diced potatoes and boiled mung beans, while the pani contains dates and boondi. In the Vastrapur neighbourhood of Ahmedabad, Gujarat, vendors serve panipuri with eight panis, including garlic and onion. Pakodi, the version of panipuri from parts of Gujarat, often excludes the tamarind water, instead using more mint and chilli, and onions are used in the filling. Some versions of pakodi add sev.

Many vendors in South India—especially in rural areas—make versions of panipuri that are spicier and less sweet, to match the popular tastes in the region's cuisine, sometimes using rasam in place of pani. The city of Bangalore has both mashed potato panipuri, widely served by North Indian migrants at small stalls, and chickpea panipuri, served by locals at carts that also sell other chaats. Onion is often added to panipuri in Bangalore. In Bangarapet, a town near Bangalore, a variation is prepared by blending ginger, green chillies, garlic, and a spices into the tangy, transparent water. Gup chup, eaten in parts of southern and eastern India, uses a chickpea filling without potatoes.

=== Modern variations ===
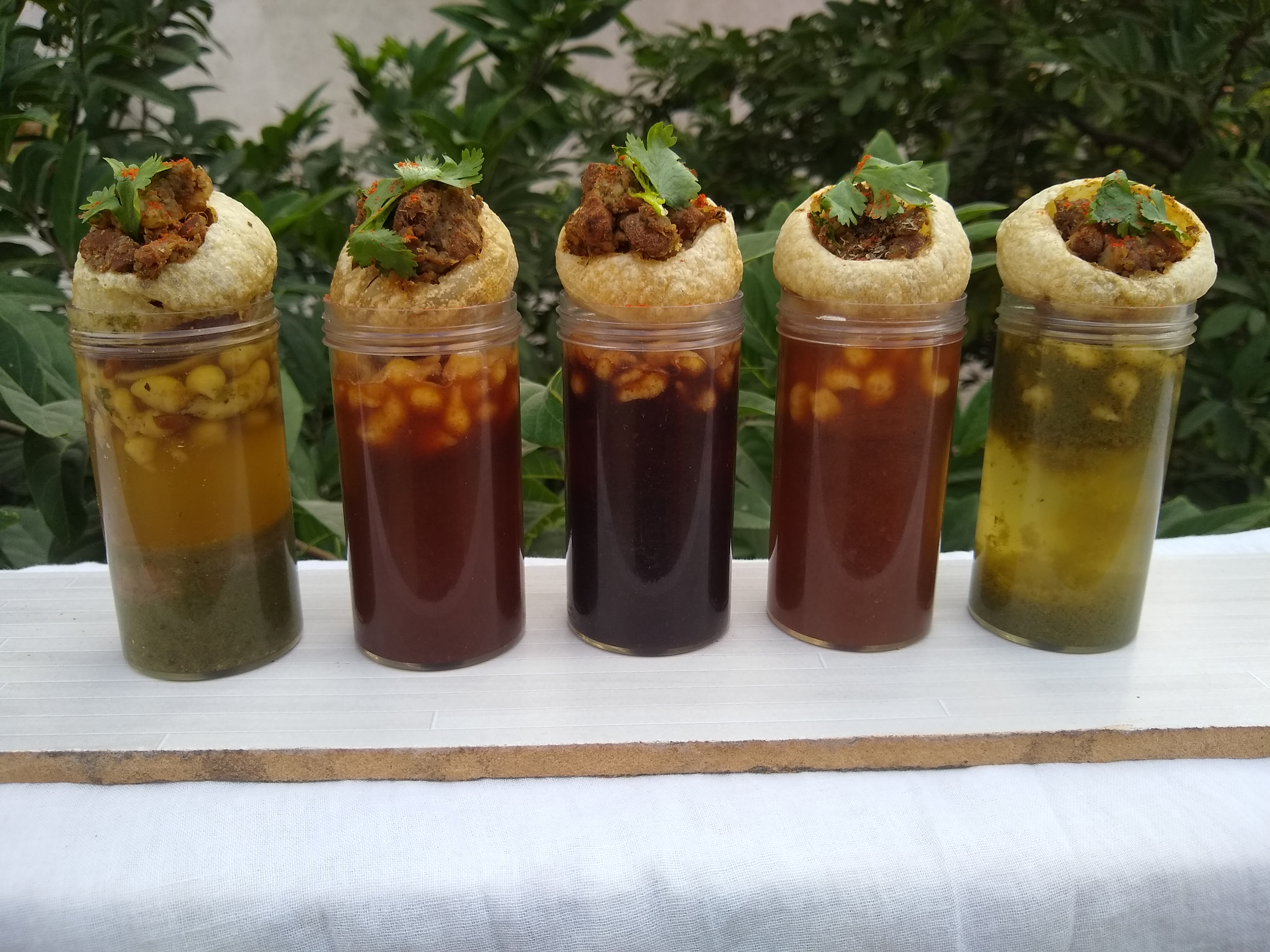
Modern versions of panipuri include panipuri shots.

Restaurants as well as street food vendors have developed non-traditional versions of panipuri, including dessert versions as well as non-vegetarian fillings. Restaurant adaptations include the use of avocado as a filling or flavoured vodka as the pani. Another upscale version is panipuri shots, in which panipuris are served on shot glasses of various flavours of pani, which combines familiar Indian cuisine with international influences. Restaurant versions of panipuri often use semolina puris as atta puris cannot hold together.

Food writer Vir Sanghvi states that the popularity of modern variations comes from the versatility of flavoured water as well as the ease of using puris as a base for other flavours, achieving a role similar to pastry doughs in European cuisine. Chef Manish Mehrotra stated that panipuri is versatile, with infinite options for ingredients.

== History ==
=== Origin and spread ===
It is not known when or by whom panipuri was invented. While ingredients such as puri and tamarind existed in ancient India, potatoes were not introduced until after the Columbian Exchange. Several stories on the origin of panipuri exist, (Note: A false claim, which may have originated as a hoax on the forum Quora, states that the invention of panipuri is mentioned in the Mahabharata.) and food historian Pushpesh Pant said that it is futile to attempt to determine the true origin. One theory recounted by the National Geographical Journal of India in 1955 states that the small, crunchy version of puri originated in Varanasi, with the remaining ingredients of panipuri added during the Mughal Empire. According to culinary anthropologist Kurush Dalal, panipuri was adapted from chaat, which originated in the North Indian region of what is now Uttar Pradesh during the reign of the seventeenth-century Mughal emperor Shah Jahan. Dalal states that the fillings of panipuri evolved from kachori and were adapted based on personal tastes.

Panipuri spread to the rest of India mainly due to internal migration in the 20th century, gaining new names and variations of ingredients. Most of the early variations maintained the traditional flavours, with minor additions such as sweet tamarind water, jal-jeera, and garlic. While amchoor was originally used as a sour flavour in Uttar Pradesh, tamarind was used instead in Bengal and Maharashtra, leading to phuchka and panipuri. The white peas that were traditional in Uttar Pradesh were replaced in Kolkata by Bengal gram and in Delhi by kabuli chana, a variation which remains hyperlocal to the city. According to Vishal, the phuchka of Kolkata evolved from the pani ke batashe of Lucknow, replacing peeli mirch with cheaper green chillies and adding gondhoraj lime, thus explaining its spicy and sour flavours. Vishal also writes that Mumbai panipuri began using ragda as it was easy to prepare, while the addition of sprouts may have been influenced by the local dishes usal and misal. The first panipuri stalls in Bangalore included Nagarthpet Panipuri, established by Uttar Pradeshi migrant Om Prakash Sharma in the 1940s. Phuchka spread to Bangladesh after the 1947 partition of India.

According to Vishal, panipuri gradually became simplified. For example, chaat establishments in Lucknow in the 1980s offered pani ke batashe with many options for pani, before restaurants from the 1990s served all golgappe with hara pani and meetha pani, while golgappe in Agra shifted from jal-jeera to basic sweet, sour, and spicy panis. Vishal attributes the simplification in part to commercial incentives to keep costs low.

=== Modern variations and international popularity ===
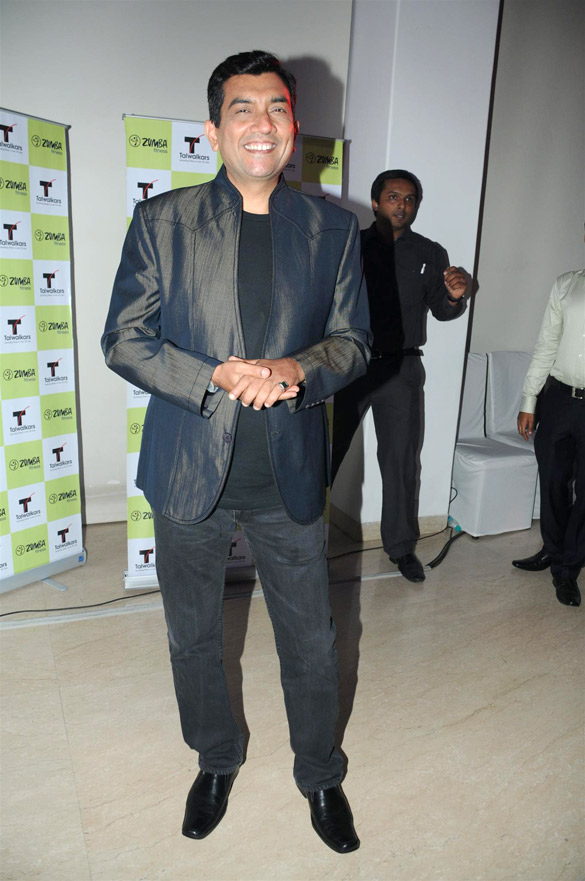
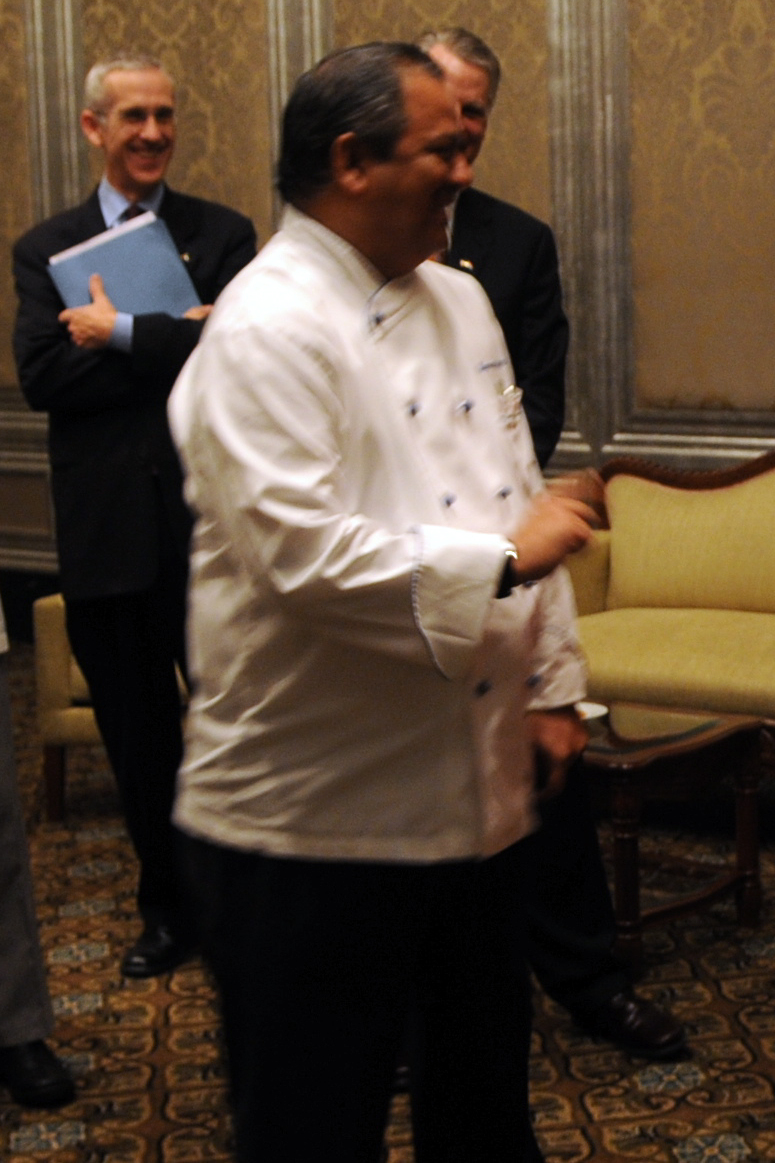
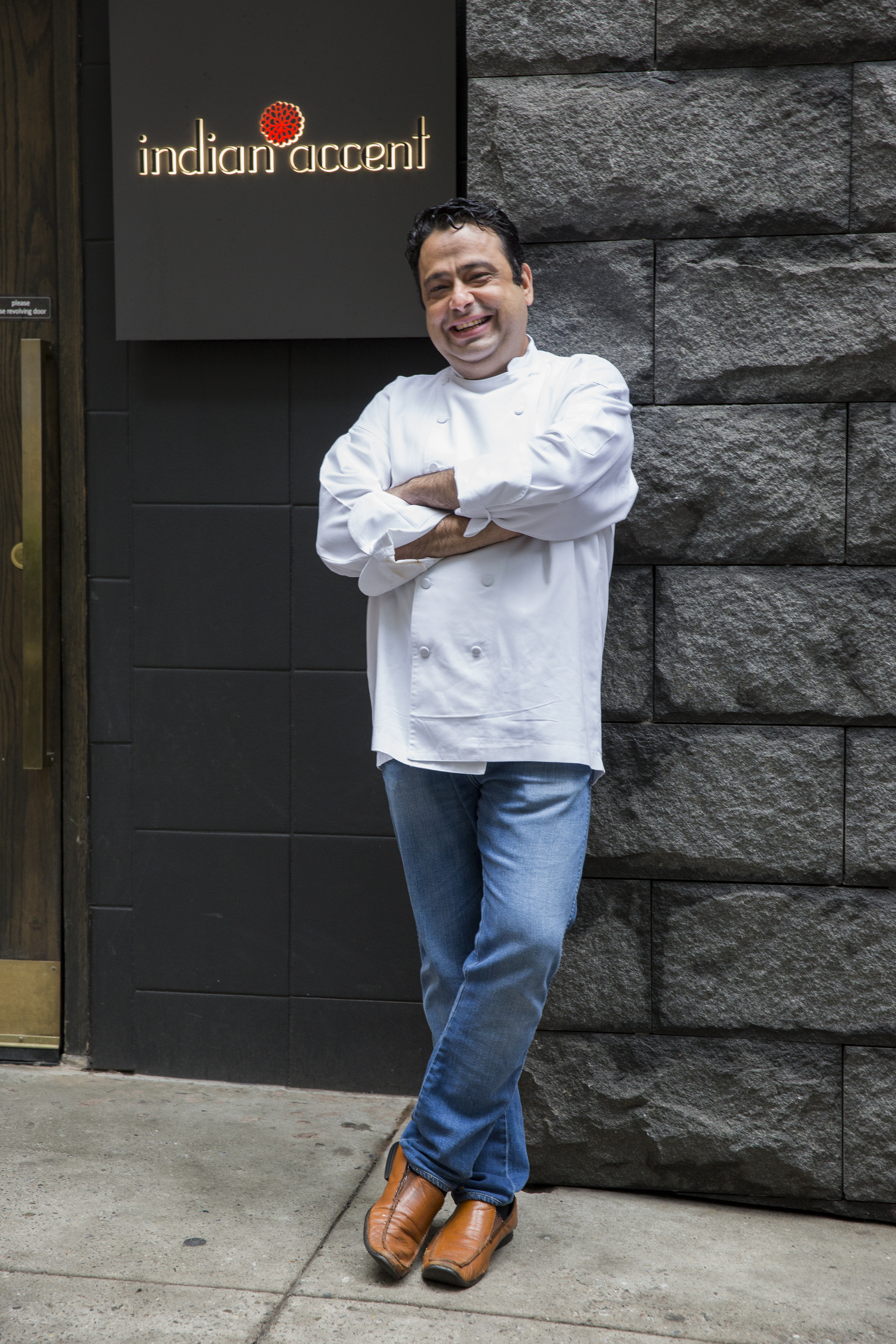
Chefs who developed panipuri variations in the 1990s and 2000s (left to right): Sanjeev Kapoor, Hemant Oberoi, Manish Mehrotra.

Modern variations of panipuri arose sometime around the 1990s, according to Sanghvi. One of the chefs developing variations of the dish was Sanjeev Kapoor, working at a restaurant in New Zealand in the 1990s, where he created grape juice panipuri, which became one of the first modern versions to gain popularity. Restaurants also began serving vodka panipuri around this time; several chefs, including Hemant Oberoi of the Taj Mahal Palace Hotel in Mumbai, claimed to have invented it. Vodka panipuri from the restaurant chain Punjabi by Nature became well-known in the early 2000s. According to Sanghvi, panipuri shots may have been invented by chef Manish Mehrotra, who began serving the item in 2009. Further variations on panipuri were created by chefs Gaggan Anand, whose dish Yoghurt Explosion used spherification to create a ball of yoghurt with a filling, and Himanshu Saini, whose restaurant Trèsind Studio in Dubai served unique versions of panipuri as its signature dish.

By the 2000s, panipuri vendors in Delhi began advertising their use of mineral water. Panipuri was the subject of a media wave in 2011, when some supporters of the Maharashtra Navnirman Sena party attacked vendors in Mumbai and Pune, in response to a video of a vendor urinating into a jar used for pani.

In addition to Bangladeshi-style phuchka, panipuri and bhelpuri became popular in Bangladesh around the 2010s. They became more popular street foods in Dhaka than traditional phuchka, doi phuchka, and chotpoti, particularly among youths. Bangladeshi-style phuchka was introduced to the United States by 2018, when a phuchka cart called Tong was founded in Jackson Heights, New York City, by Bangladeshi immigrant Naeem Khandaker. Several other phuchka carts opened on the same city block in the following years—by 2023, there were over eight—mostly established by former employees of Khandaker.

During the COVID-19 lockdown in India, homemade panipuri became popular as street foods were not available. In the five weeks following the first lockdown order on 25 March 2020, Google searches for panipuri recipes doubled, and the food was a common topic on social media. Kolkata-style phuchka became a nationwide trend around this time. According to Condé Nast Traveller, online virality led to a wave of new interpretations of panipuri—as well as other street foods such as Maggi noodles—in 2020 and 2021. These included a panipuri set on fire, which was created at Chaska Chaat in Nagpur before being imitated elsewhere, and a large, overloaded variation called bahubali paani puri, served at Chirag ka Chaska in Nagpur. Around the early 2020s, Punjabi restaurants began serving versions of the dish, including butter chicken panipuri. Non-traditional variations of panipuri also began being served by street vendors, becoming popular for their visual appeal and hygiene; viral phenomena included including shawarma panipuri served by carts in Hyderabad and phuchka chops served by a vendor in Kolkata.

Chaats such as panipuri surged in popularity in South India—including in rural areas and around the cities of Madurai and Coimbatore—in the 2020s. They overtook the popularity of local snacks. The dish was still associated with North India; in 2022, Tamil Nadu politician K. Ponmudy disparagingly described Hindi speakers as "selling pani puri". Panipuri, like other Indian dishes, became popular in China in the 2020s, inspiring the hashtag #IndianCrispyBall and being depicted in the video game Genshin Impact. The popularity of panipuri also grew in the United States, with the dish being served at the White House several times by 2024.

== Consumption ==
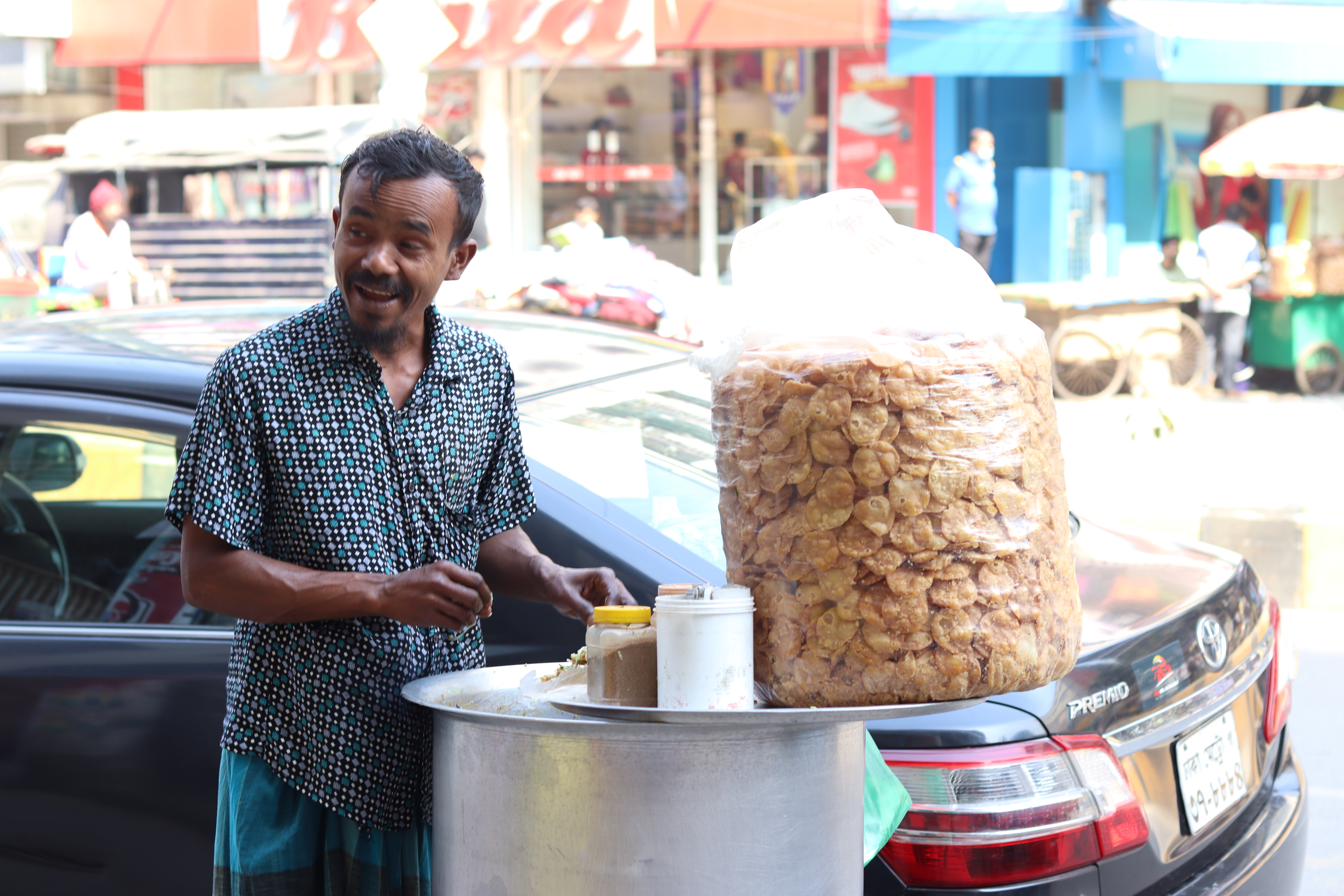
Panipuri is a popular street food.

Panipuri is the most popular street food in the Indian subcontinent. It is a highly popular fast food in India and in Nepal. Many panipuri wallas achieve fame within their neighbourhoods for the ways they prepare the dish. The typical price in India is 30 rupees (US$0.41) for six panipuris, as of 2021. Becoming a panipuri vendor has a low cost requirement, making it a popular occupation for internal migrant workers. Panipuri vendors are usually migrants from the Hindi Belt; there was a particularly high proportion of Rajasthanis until the 21st century.

Panipuri is popular in both urban and rural areas and among all ages and social classes. It is popular across genders, though it is particularly seen as a women's snack. Film critic Sohini Chattopadhyay noted that female film characters are shown eating panipuri more than other foods. Urban geographer Hugo Ribadeau Dumas found that, in Purnea, Bihar, in 2022, most women preferred panipuri over other street foods. Ribadeau Dumas attributed this phenomenon to the social acceptability of panipuri as a frivolous snack for women, as depicted in film and advertising, as well as gender norms against public leisure activities for women, as other street foods take more time to eat.

Stores sell pre-packaged puri shells for panipuri. Restaurants often purchase pre-packaged shells from bulk suppliers, although some make them fresh with custom recipes. A ready-to-fry version, consisting of thin sheets of dough, has been available at stores since around the 2010s.

=== By region ===
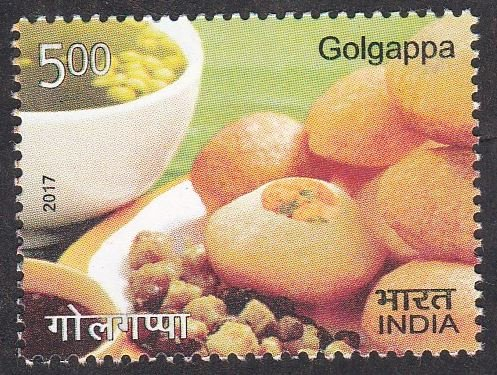
Stamp of India 2017 Golgappa

Panipuri is a traditional street food of Delhi, where vendors are typically migrants from Uttar Pradesh or Bihar. Compared to other street foods in the city, selling panipuri requires the lowest investment. Most vendors migrate to the city with the intent to enter this job, often learning to make the dish before migrating; this commonly involves chain migration as a panipuri vendor invites others within their social network to set up a shop in the same neighbourhood. Some of the city's panipuri vendors expand to sell other chaats, such as papri chaat or aloo tikki. Restaurants in Delhi commonly serve non-traditional panipuris.

According to ethnographer Arindam Das, phuchka is culturally associated with Bengali identity; for example, the 1981 film 36 Chowringhee Lane depicts an Anglo-Indian character eating the food with Bengali friends to represent the intermingling of their cultures. In Kolkata, the most famous phuchka vendors include those of the Vivekananda Park neighbourhood, and the city's ITC Royal Bengal hotel serves the dish more than any other hotel in India. A tradition in Kolkata is for the vendor to serve a dry phuchka for free at the end of a round. The nearby village of Shahid Pally is nicknamed "Phuchkagram" as most of its families are employed in the phuchka industry, producing most of the supply in Kolkata and surrounding areas. In Bangladesh, panipuri and chotpoti are served by the same street vendors. Bangladeshi phuchka was listed by the American media network CNN in its "50 of the best street foods in Asia" in 2022.

In Mumbai, panipuri is popular on beaches. In Pakistan, golgappe were historically served from street carts, although snack restaurants have become more popular.

Panipuri is also served as a street food in South India, requiring less cost and labour than regionally traditional snacks such as paniyaram. The city of Hyderabad has many popular panipuri stalls; the Hussain Sagar neighbourhood had over one hundred vendors of the snack in 2025. Panipuri and other chaats are also popular in the South Indian city of Mysore, alongside dishes more local to the region, having historically been sold by migrants from Uttar Pradesh or Bihar. In the city of Vijayawada, Andhra Pradesh, street vendors sell panipuri on a plate with a spoon.

Indian migrants have introduced panipuri to other parts of the world. In London, it was popularised by chefs Vineet Bhatia and Atul Kochhar. Restaurants in Dubai serve several regional styles, while restaurants in Washington, D.C., mostly serve it filled with chickpeas and potatoes. Modern versions of panipuri are served by chefs globally.

== See also ==
- Pholourie
- Jian dui

== Works cited ==
- Alam, S. M. Nazmul (2020). "Introduction". Nutritional and Health Aspects of Food in South Asian Countries. Elsevier. pp. 213–215. doi:10.1016/b978-0-12-820011-7.00024-1. ISBN 978-0-12-820011-7.
- Mukhopadhyay, Bhaskar (May 2004). "Between Elite Hysteria and Subaltern Carnivalesque: the Politics of Street-Food in the City of Calcutta". South Asia Research. 24 (1): 37–50. doi:10.1177/0262728004042762. ISSN 0262-7280.
- Bhat, R. V.; Wagray, K. (2000). "Profile of Street Foods Sold in Asian Countries". In Simopolous, A. P.; Bhat, R. V. (eds.). Street Foods. World Review of Nutrition and Dietetics. Vol. 86. Basel: Karger Publishers. pp. 53–99. ISBN 3-8055-6927-0 – via Internet Archive.
- Bhatt, Sheela (2011). "Food is Serious Business". In Balasubrahmanyan, Suchitra; Sagara, Sharmila (eds.). Ahmedabad 600: portraits of a city. Mumbai: Marg Foundation. pp. 94–105. ISBN 978-81-921106-0-8 – via Internet Archive.
- Bhattacharya, Suvendu (2023). Snack foods: processing and technology. Academic Press. ISBN 978-0-12-819759-2.
- Dandavate, Uday (2010). "Icons of Mumbai". Economic and Political Weekly. 45 (47): 29–31. ISSN 0012-9976. JSTOR 25764148.
- Das, Arindam (3 July 2025). "Family recipe diaries and consumption of transcultural Anglo-Indian identity". Asian Ethnicity. 26 (3): 552–576. doi:10.1080/14631369.2024.2444266. ISSN 1463-1369.
- Hassan, Rafid; Shamim, Abu Ahmed; Ali, Masum; Amin, Md. Ruhul (September 2025). "What Drives Fast Food Consumption in Asian Low- and Middle-Income Countries?—A Narrative Review of Patterns and Influencing Factors". Public Health Challenges. 4 (3) e70095. Wiley. doi:10.1002/puh2.70095. ISSN 2769-2450. PMC 12320721. PMID 40762002.
- Kapoor, Sanjeev (2011). Mastering the art of Indian cooking. Stewart, Tabori & Chang. ISBN 978-1-58479-933-7 – via Internet Archive.
- Karmakar, Kalyan (2016). The travelling belly : eating through India's by-lanes. Gurgaon: Hachette India. ISBN 978-93-5009-910-0 – via Internet Archive.
- Kaur Sabharwal, Prabhjot; Arya, Vandana; Verma, Chaynika (2020). "Street Foods: Safety and Potential". In Thakur, Monika; Modi, V. K. (eds.). Emerging technologies in food science: focus on the developing world. Singapore: Springer International Publishing. ISBN 978-981-15-2556-8.
- Kundu, Aditi; Dutta, Sayak (2020). "Migration and Entry to Urban Street Food Market: A Study of Selected Street Food Vendors in Delhi". In Bandyopadhyay, Sumana; Pathak, Chitta Ranjan; Dentinho, Tomaz Ponce (eds.). Urbanization and Regional Sustainability in South Asia. Cham: Springer International Publishing. pp. 39–54. doi:10.1007/978-3-030-23796-7_4. ISBN 978-3-030-23795-0.
- Loss, Christopher R.; Bouzari, Ali (15 March 2016). "On food and chemesthesis – food science and culinary perspectives". In McDonald, Shane T.; Bolliet, David A.; Hayes, John E. (eds.). Chemesthesis (1 ed.). Wiley. pp. 250–267. doi:10.1002/9781118951620.ch13. ISBN 978-1-118-95173-6.
- Misra, P. K. (December 2019). "Ethnographic Approach in Understanding Street Vendors in Modern India: A Plea for Research and Documentation". Journal of the Anthropological Survey of India. 68 (2): 175–190. doi:10.1177/2277436X19877311. ISSN 2277-436X.
- Mitra, Abhijit; Zaman, Sufia; Pramanick, Prosenjit (2022). "Blue Economy and Livelihoods in Indian Sundarbans". Blue Economy in Indian Sundarbans. Cham: Springer International Publishing. pp. 175–259. doi:10.1007/978-3-031-07908-5_3. ISBN 978-3-031-07907-8.
- Mukerjee Furstenau, Nina (2021). Green chili and other impostors. FoodStory. Iowa City: University of Iowa Press. ISBN 978-1-60938-798-3.
- Nanjangud, Apoorva; Reddy, Madhavi (July 2020). "'The Test of Taste': New Media and the 'Progressive Indian Foodscape'". Journal of Creative Communications. 15 (2): 177–193. doi:10.1177/0973258619893804. ISSN 0973-2586.
- Pandey, Swati; Bhushan, Keshani; Singh Kocher, Gurvinder; Sahota, Param Pal (14 May 2024). "Microbiological assessment of ready-to-eat foods and drinking water sources as a potential vehicle of bacterial pathogens in northern India". Environmental Monitoring and Assessment. 196 (6) 547. Bibcode:2024EMnAs.196..547P. doi:10.1007/s10661-024-12704-0. ISSN 0167-6369. PMID 38743188.
- Prapti, Bushra Benta Rahman; Ahmmed, Md. Tanjir; Proma, Nishita Ghosh; Aunu, Durratul Zanan; Shampa, Shumia Islam; Rahman, Aminur; Islam, Md. Shafiqul; Siddique, Mahbubul Pratik (December 2025). "Bacterial load assessment and multi-drug resistant Bacteria isolation from Fuchka in Mymensingh City, Bangladesh". One Health. 21 101170. doi:10.1016/j.onehlt.2025.101170. PMC 12396293. PMID 40894952.
- Ray, Krishnendu (3 March 2020). "Vernacular Taste and Urban Transformation: Towards an Analytics of Fun and a New Kind of Critique". South Asia: Journal of South Asian Studies. 43 (2): 308–318. doi:10.1080/00856401.2020.1716501. ISSN 0085-6401.
