= Chaat =

Savoury Indian-originated snack

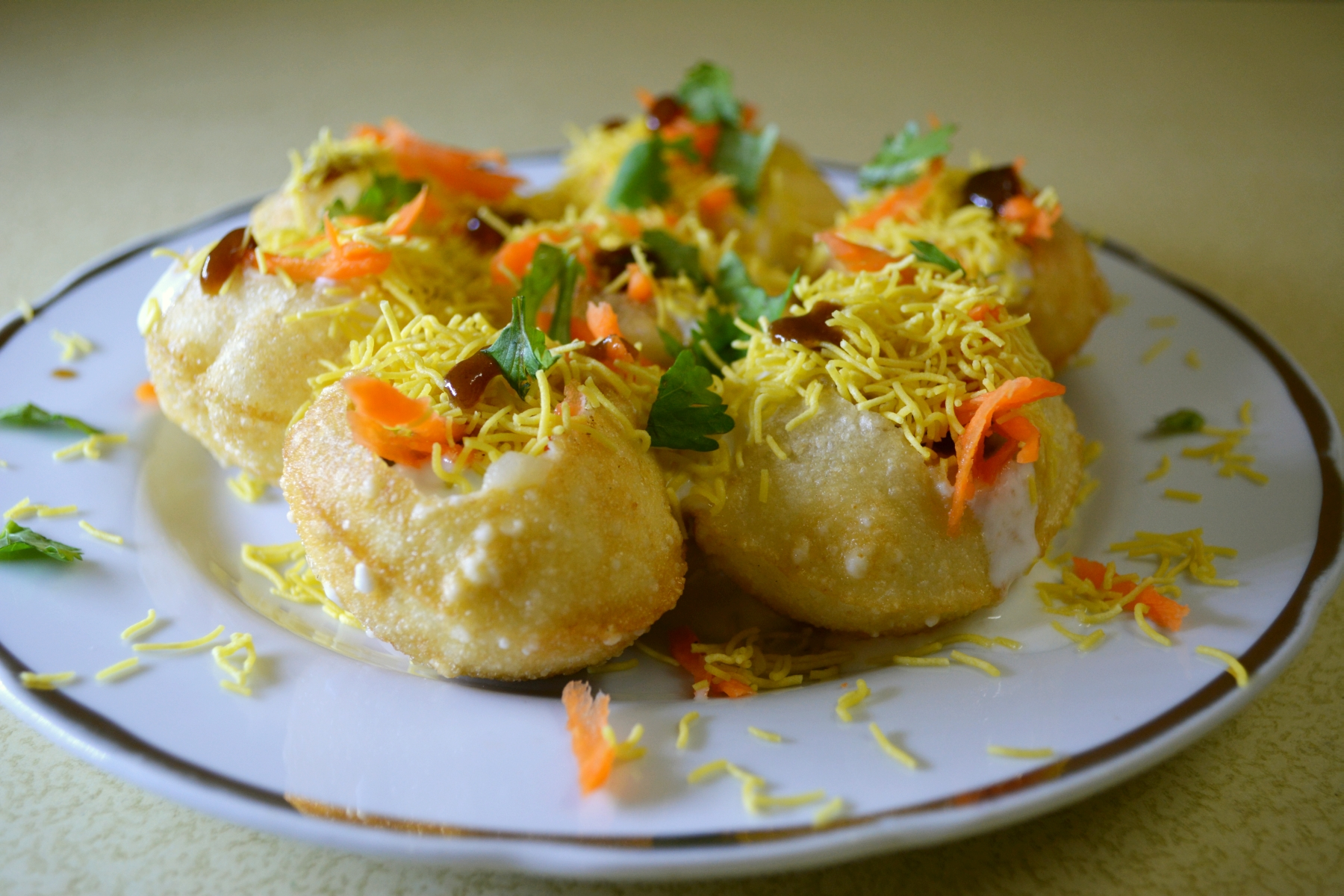
- Dahi puri, a variation of panipuri
- Type: Snack
- Place of origin: India
- Region or state: Uttar Pradesh, Delhi, Gujarat, Rajasthan, Odisha, West Bengal, Bihar & Madhya Pradesh and Bhojpuri region

Chaat, or chāt (IAST: cāṭ, IPA: [tʃaːʈ], lit. 'lick, tasting, delicacy') is a family of fried dough snacks that originated in India, typically served as an hors d'oeuvre or at roadside carts from stalls or food carts across South Asia. With its origins in Uttar Pradesh, chaat has become popular in the rest of South Asia.

== Etymology ==
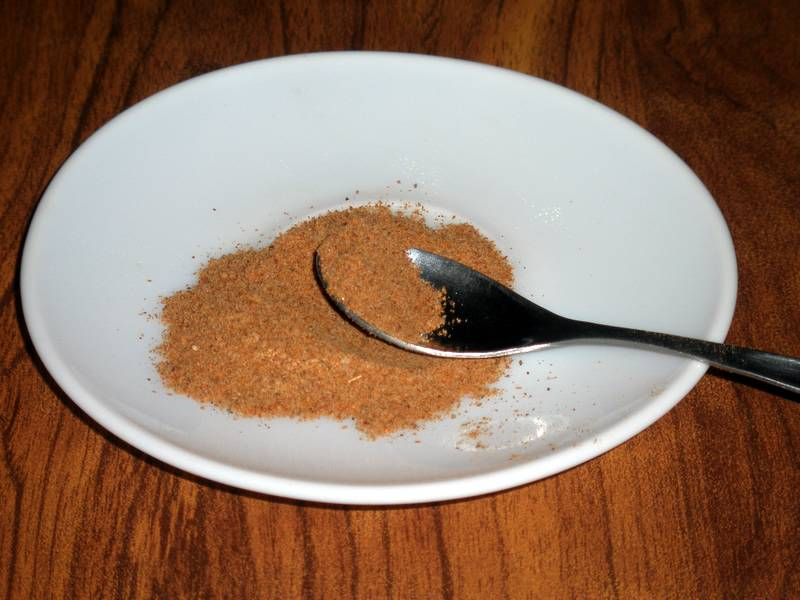
Chaat masala is a distinct spice blend used specifically in chaat snacks.

The word derives from the Indian word cāṭ चाट (tasting, a delicacy), from cāṭnā चाटना (to lick, as in licking one's fingers while eating), from Prakrit caṭṭei चट्टेइ (to devour with relish, eat noisily).

== Overview ==
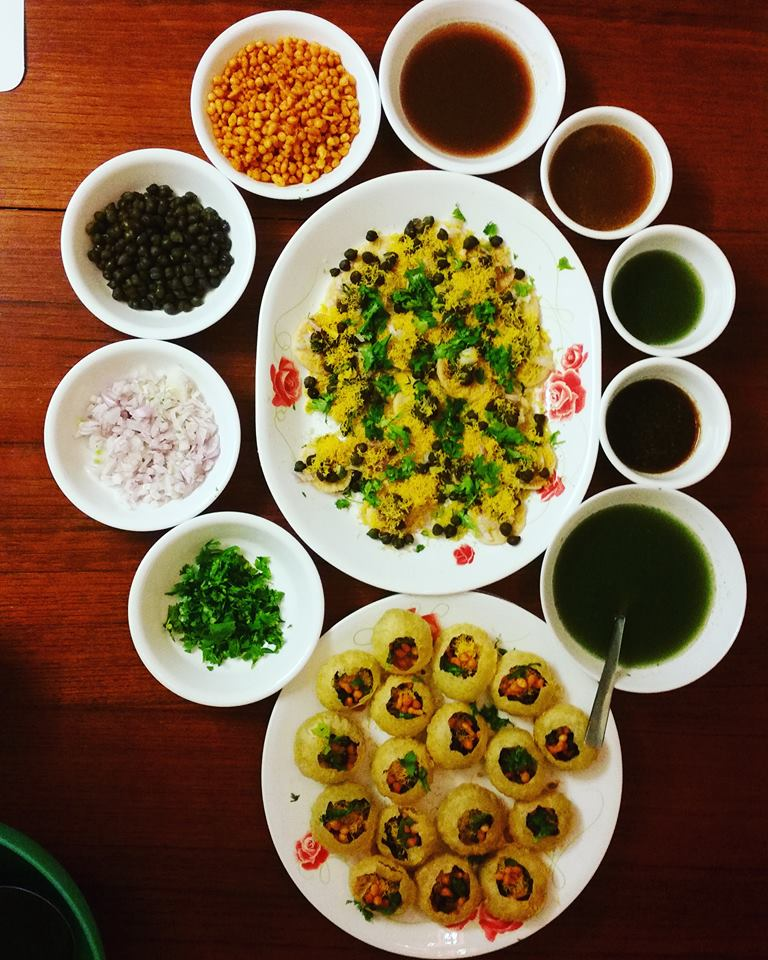
Panipuri is one of the best-known chaats in South Asia.

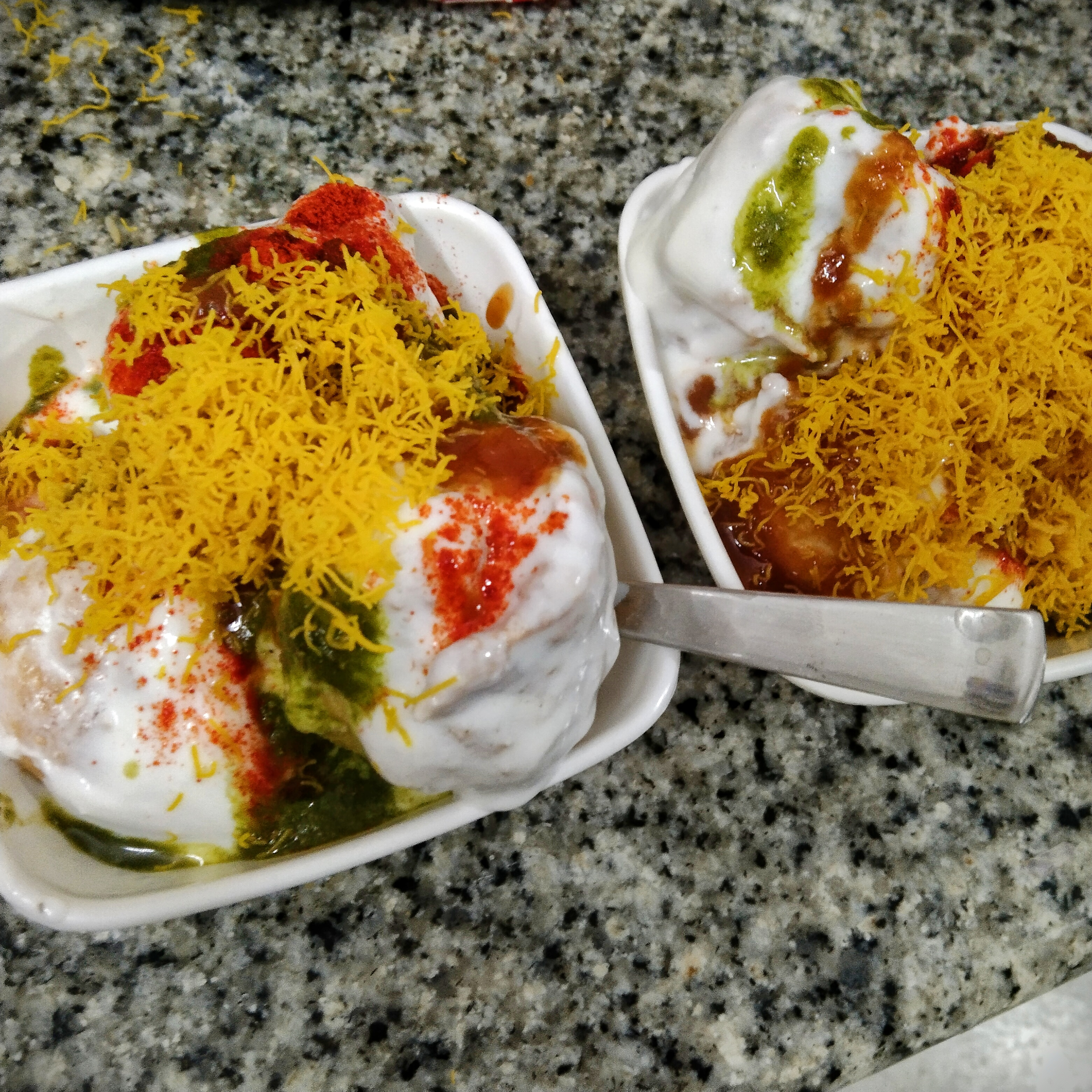
Dahi vada chaat with yogurt

All chaat variants are based on fried dough. The original chaat is a mixture of potato pieces, crisp fried bread, dahi vada or dahi bhalla, gram or chickpeas and tangy-salty spices, with sour Indian chili and saunth (dried ginger and tamarind sauce), fresh green coriander leaves and yogurt for garnish. Other common variants include alu tikkis or samosa (garnished with onion, potatoes, coriander, peas, hot spices and a dash of yogurt), bhel puri, dahi puri, panipuri, dahi vada, papri chaat, and sev puri.

There are common elements among these variants including dahi (yogurt); chopped onions and coriander; sev (thin dried yellow salty noodles); and chaat masala, typically consisting of amchoor (dried mango powder), cumin, kala namak (Himalayan black rock salt), coriander, dried ginger, salt, black pepper, and red pepper. The ingredients are combined and served on a small metal plate or a banana leaf, dried and formed into a bowl.

== History ==
Some of the dishes now categorized as chaats, such as dahi vada, can be traced back to ancient periods. A recipe for a dahi vada analogue called kshiravata is mentioned in Manasollasa, a 12th-century Sanskrit encyclopedia compiled by Someshvara III, who ruled from present-day Karnataka. According to food historian K.T Achaya, descriptions of dahi vada also appear in literature far earlier from 500 BC.

Another dish resembling chaat as an organized phenomenon or distinct group of dishes, according to culinary anthropologist Kurush Dalal, originated in northern India (now Uttar Pradesh) in the late 17th century during the reign of Mughal emperor Shah Jahan. The royal doctors had asked the people of Delhi to consume spicy and fried snacks, as well as dahi, as a countermeasure to the alkaline water of the Yamuna river that coursed through the city.

Most chaats originated in parts of Uttar Pradesh in India later in the 20th century, but they are now eaten all across South Asia and neighboring countries. Some are results of cultural syncretism.

== Variations ==
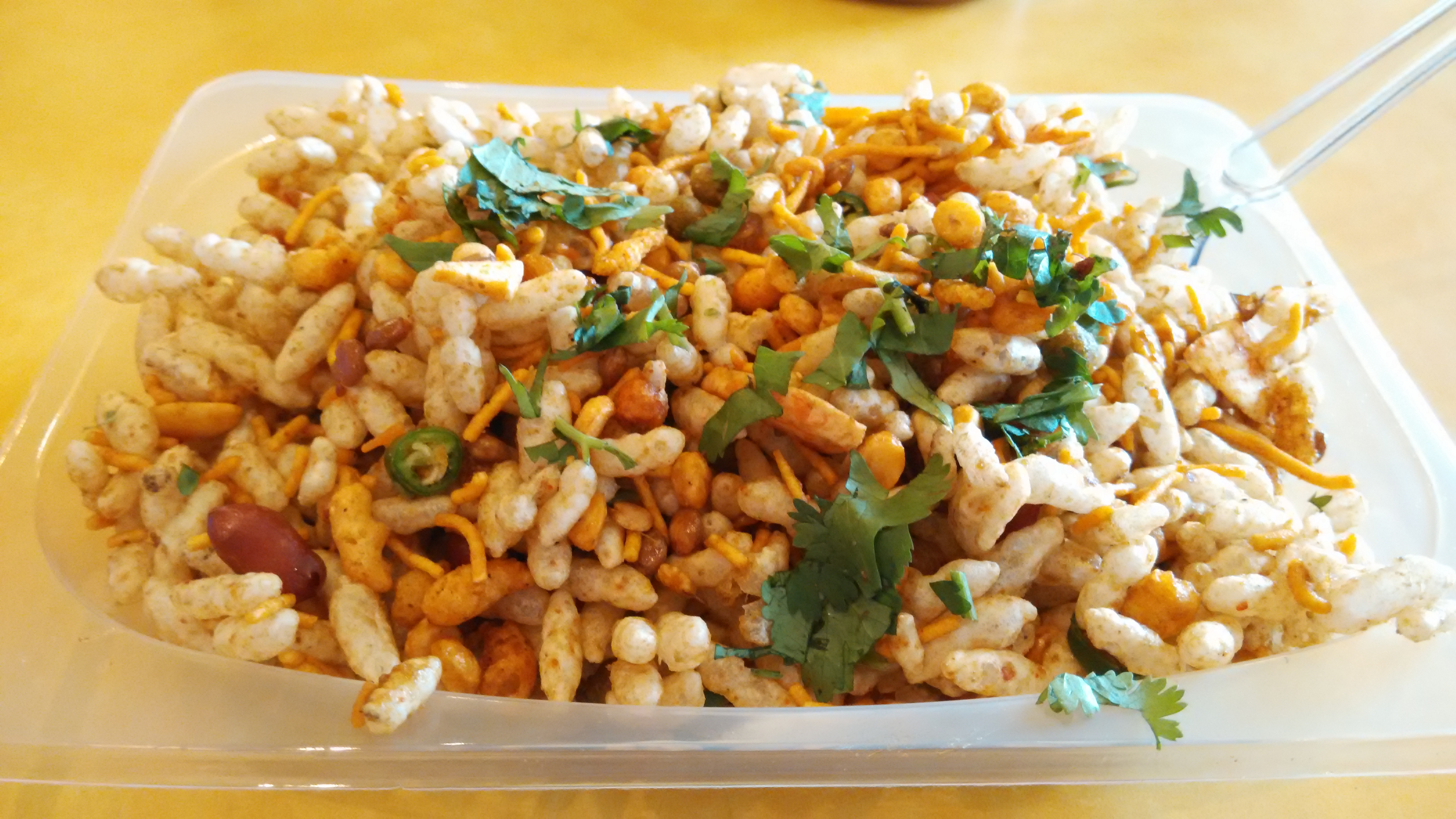
Bhelpuri is a popular puffed-rice chaat.

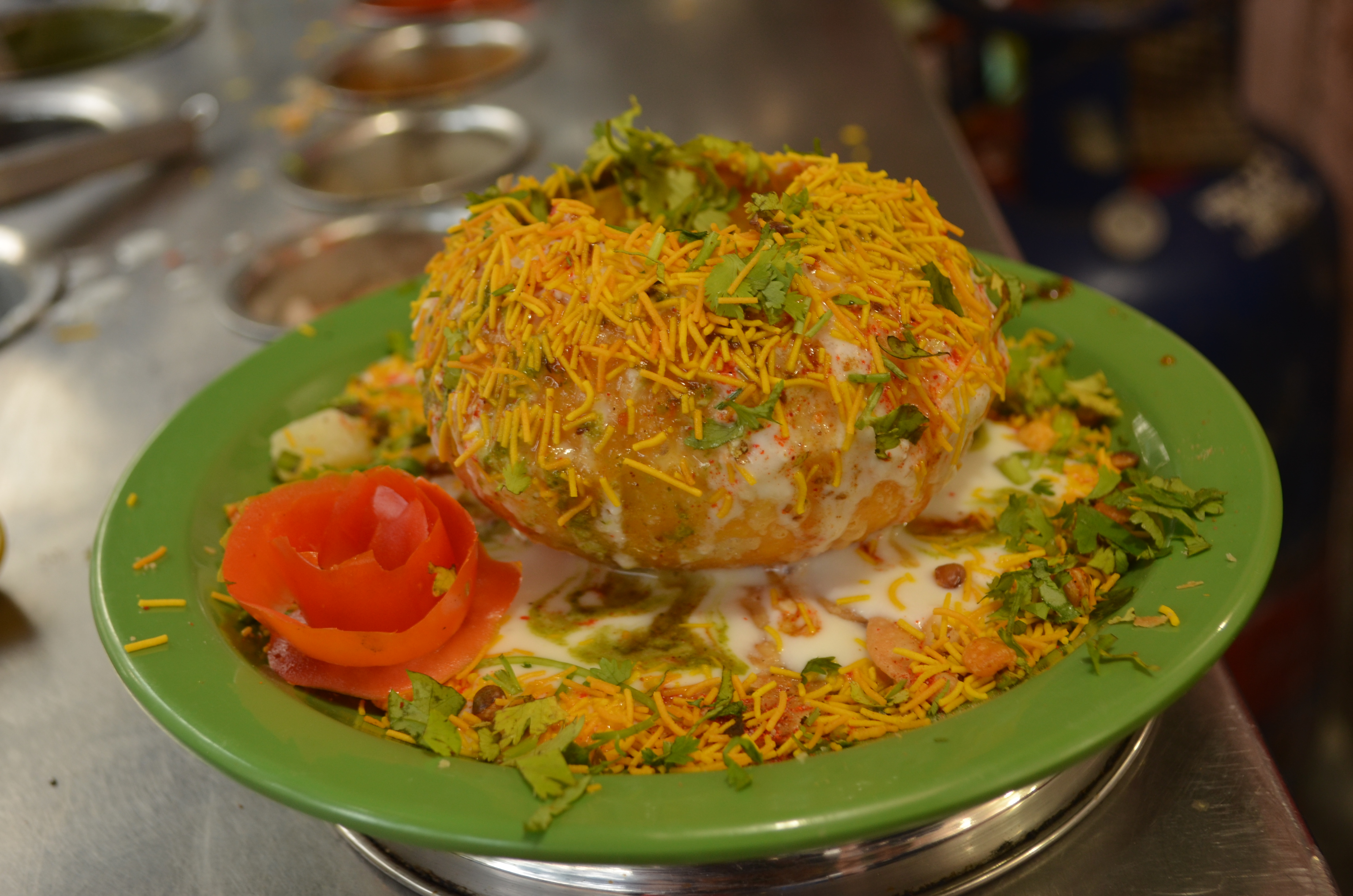
Raj kachori chaat

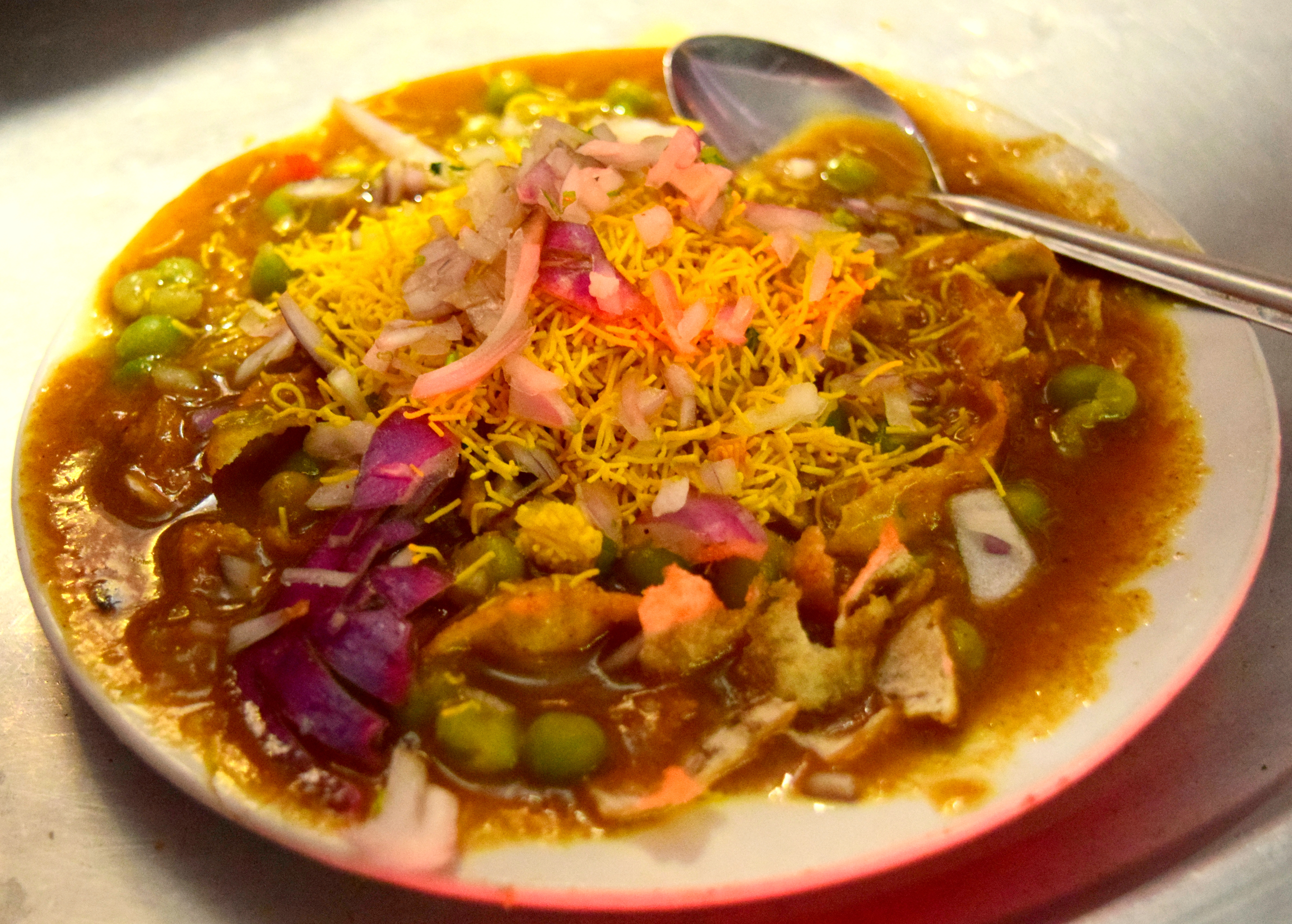
A plate of masala puri made by street vendors in the chaat stalls near Bangalore

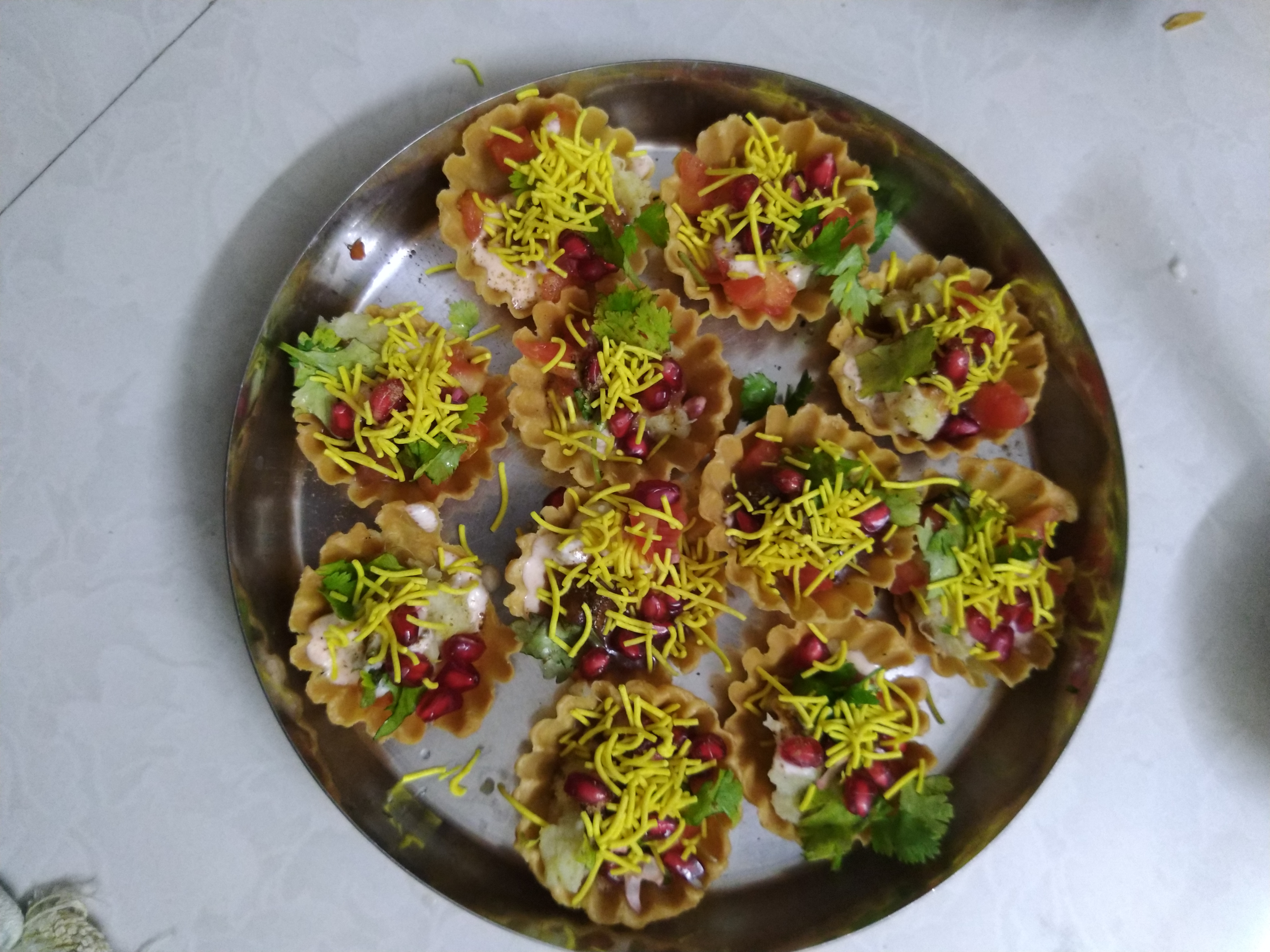
Katori chaat

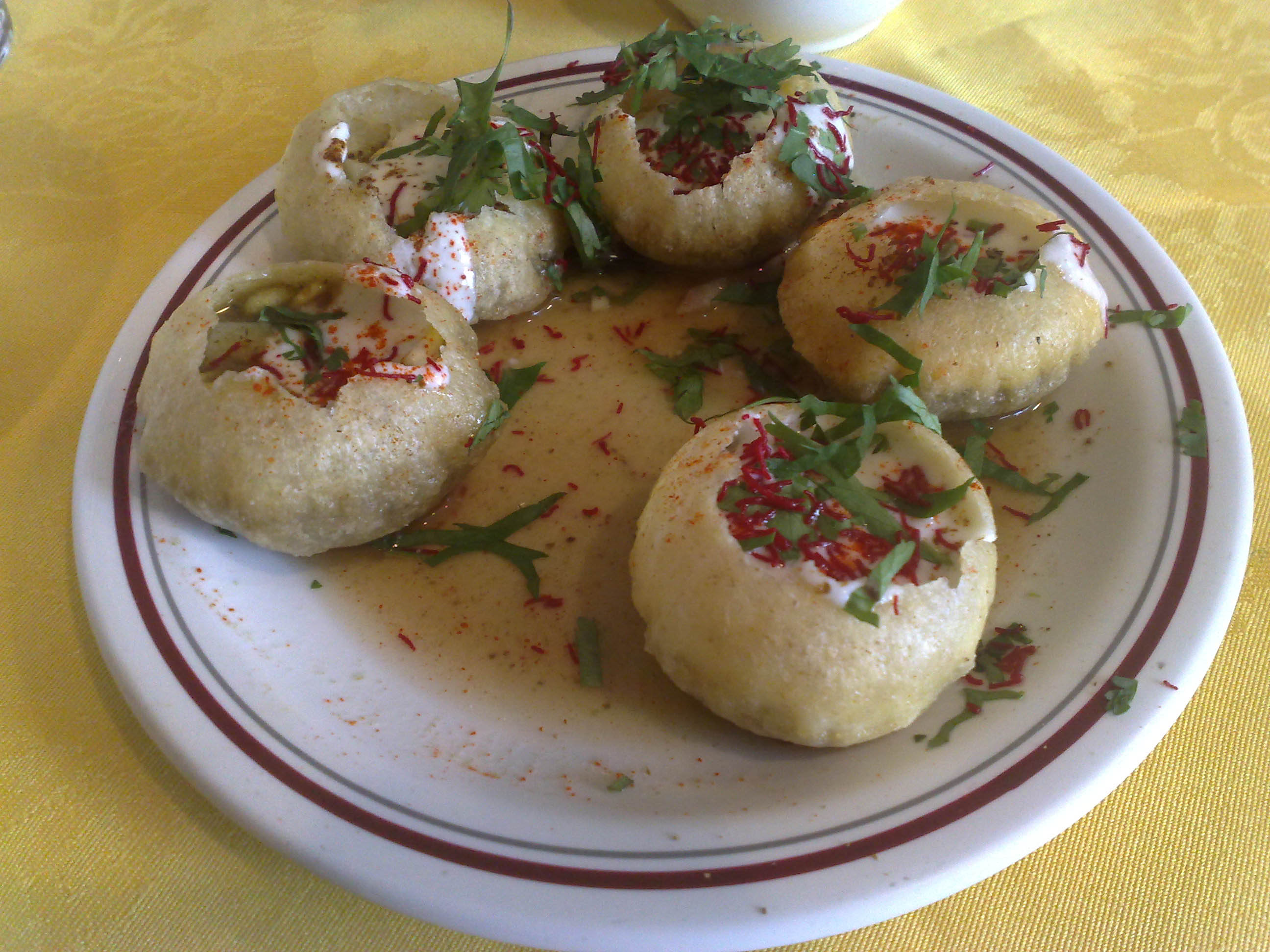
Dahi puri chaat

- Alu chaat - Potatoes (alu in Hindi) cut into small pieces, fried until crisp and served with chutney
- Alu tikki
- Bedmi - Puri stuffed with dal and fried until crisp; typically served with alu sabji and eaten for breakfast
- Bhalla
- Bhelpuri
- Cheela- Besan (chickpea flour) pancakes served with chutney and sooth (sweet chutney)
- Chotpoti, mixture of boiled diced potatoes, boiled chickpeas and sliced onions and chillies with grated eggs on top. Many kinds of roasted spice powder are used in its preparation.
- Dahi puri
- Dahi vada
- Kachori- or kachauri, with variants such as khasta kachuari
- Mangode - Similar to pakora, but besan paste is replaced with yellow moong paste
- Masalapuri
- Pakora - Small pieces of paneer, vegetables, or meat dipped in besan paste and fried.
- Panipuri
- Papri chaat - This contains fried patties called papri as an extra ingredient.
- Ragda patties (alu tikki chaat)
- Samosa chaat - samosa is broken into pieces with green and sweet chutney added
- Sevpuri
- Vada pav
- Dahi bhallay ki chaat (bhallay, potatoes, chickpeas, imli chutney, chaat masala, onions, tomatoes, dahi, and other ingredients)
- Beetroot and potato chaat
- Dhaka chaat
- Thattu vadai set
- Dal ki chaat - Made with moong dal mixed with spices and chutney and accompanied with wheat biscuits. Popular in Meerut.
- Raj kachori - a hollow ball made with wheat and filled with sprouts, chickpeas, potatoes, bhalla and chutneys (sweet and green).
- Basket chaat - Edible bowl made with potato and filled with sprouts, chickpeas, potato and chutneys. Popular in Lucknow.
- Ram ladoo - Round fritters made from moong dal and served with radish and grey chutney.
- Dabeli - a sweet and sour burger made with potatoes, sev, groundnut and pomegranate
- Barule - whole potato coated with besan, deep-fried and served with green chutney

== See also ==
- List of Indian snack foods
