= Chotpoti =

Bengali street food

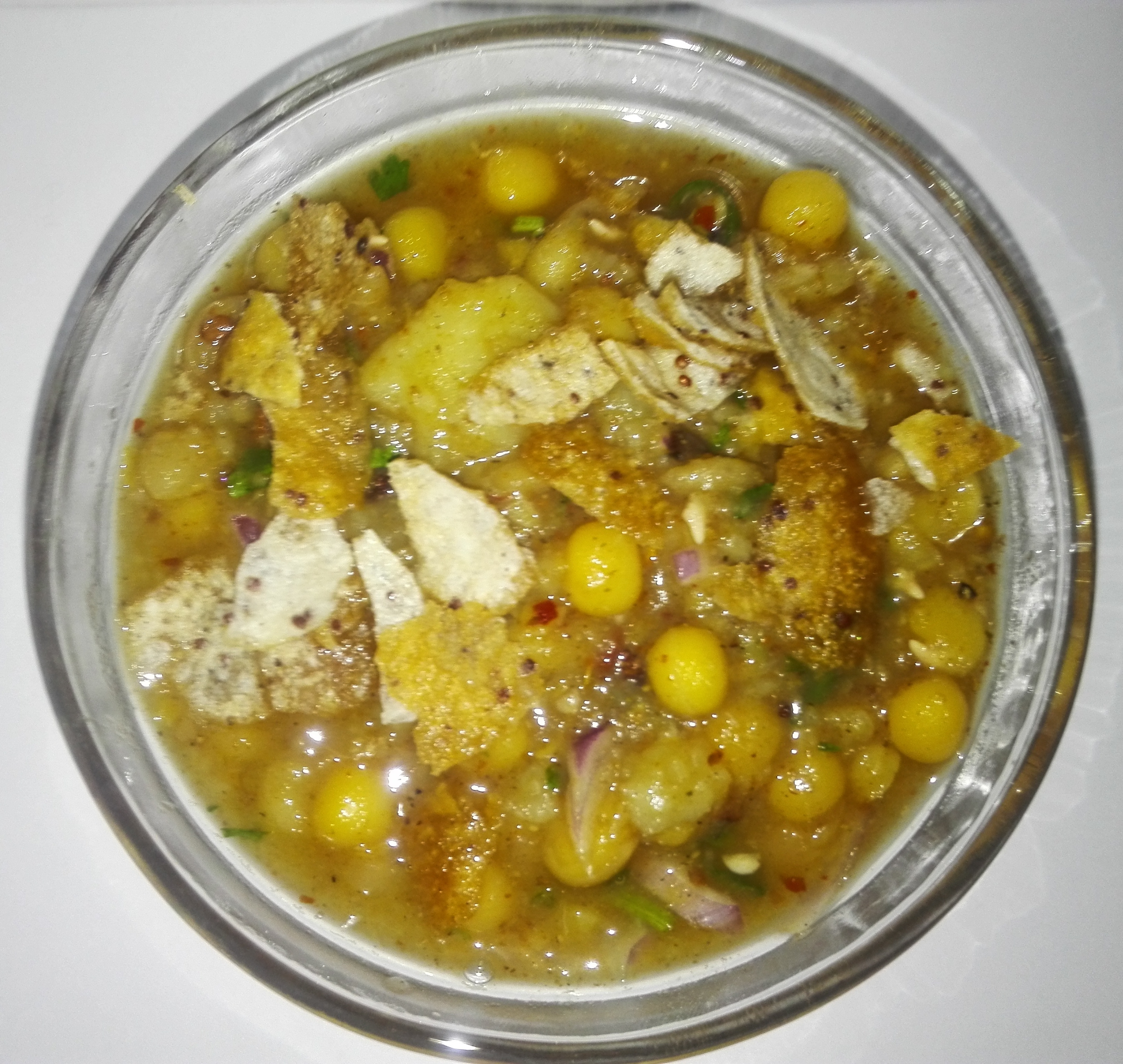
- A plate of Chotpoti.
- Alternative names: চটপটি (In Bengali)
- Type: Street food
- Place of origin: Bangladesh
- Region or state: Bangladesh
- Main ingredients: Potatoes, chickpeas, onions, chillies

Chotpoti (Bengali: চটপটি Côṭpôṭi), is a Bengali street food popular in Bangladesh, mostly in urban areas. The word 'chotpoti' translates to 'spicy' (as in, having many different spices, not simply 'hot').

The dish consists mainly of potatoes, dubli, onions and is usually topped with additional diced chillies or grated boiled eggs. Other common toppings include tamarind chutney, coriander leaves, cumin, and crispy puri. It is usually served hot and tastes both spicy and sour at the same time. One can choose to make it more spicy or sour or balanced, according to their taste, by asking the shopkeeper.

== See also ==
- Bhelpuri
- Chaat
- Chaat masala
- Phuchka
