= Aloo tikki =

Snack originating from the Indian subcontinent

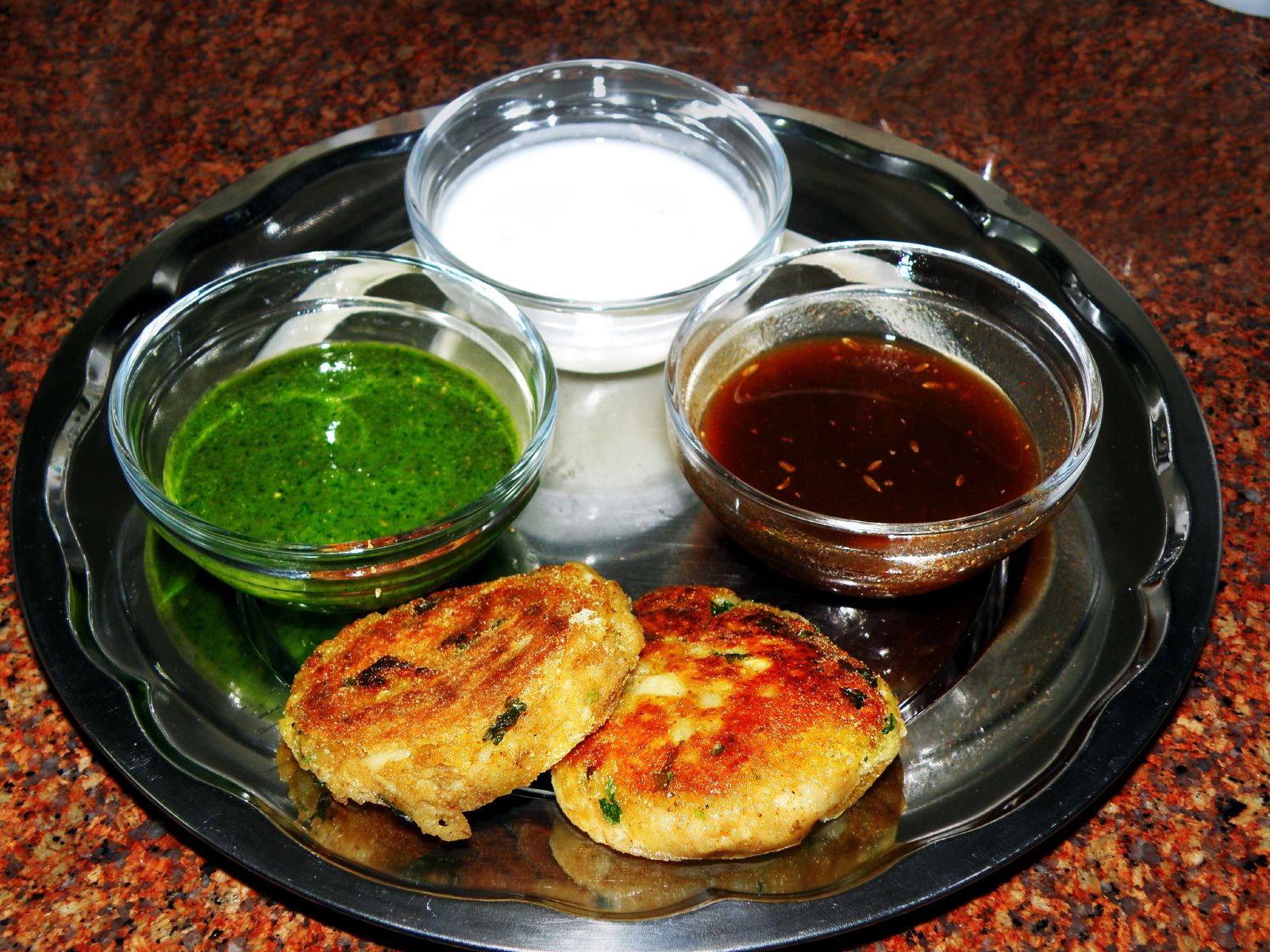
- Aloo tikki served with mint and tamarind sauces and yogurt
- Alternative names: Aloo ki tikkia Aloo ki tikki
- Type: Snack
- Place of origin: Indian subcontinent
- Region or state: India, Bangladesh, and Pakistan
- Serving temperature: Hot
- Main ingredients: Potatoes, peas, spices, herbs
- Variations: Ragda pattice

Aloo tikki, also known as aloo ki tikkia, aloo ki tikki or alu tikki, is a vegetarian snack originating from the Indian subcontinent. In Indian, Pakistani, and Bangladeshi preparation, it is made of boiled potatoes, peas, and various Indian spices. Aloo means potato in Hindi-Urdu, and tikki is a small cutlet or croquette. The dish is served hot along with a side of saunth, tamarind, and coriander-mint sauce, and sometimes dahi (yogurt) or chickpeas.

== Variations ==
Because of the broad geographical distribution of Indian people throughout the world, a number of variations on this dish exist.

In Maharashtra, a popular version of aloo tikki is served with a spicy curry and various chutneys. It is called ragda pattice and is sold at various chaat stalls throughout the city and especially on Chowpatti Beach. The aloo tikki in this region is made of mainly locally grown spices such as turmeric, whereas in Bangalore, more coriander is used.

In the United Kingdom, vegetable tikki is available from delicatessen counters at various shops.

Some North Indian dhabas or café-style eateries will sandwich the aloo in bread.

== See also ==
- Vada pav
