= Manish Mehrotra =

Indian chef

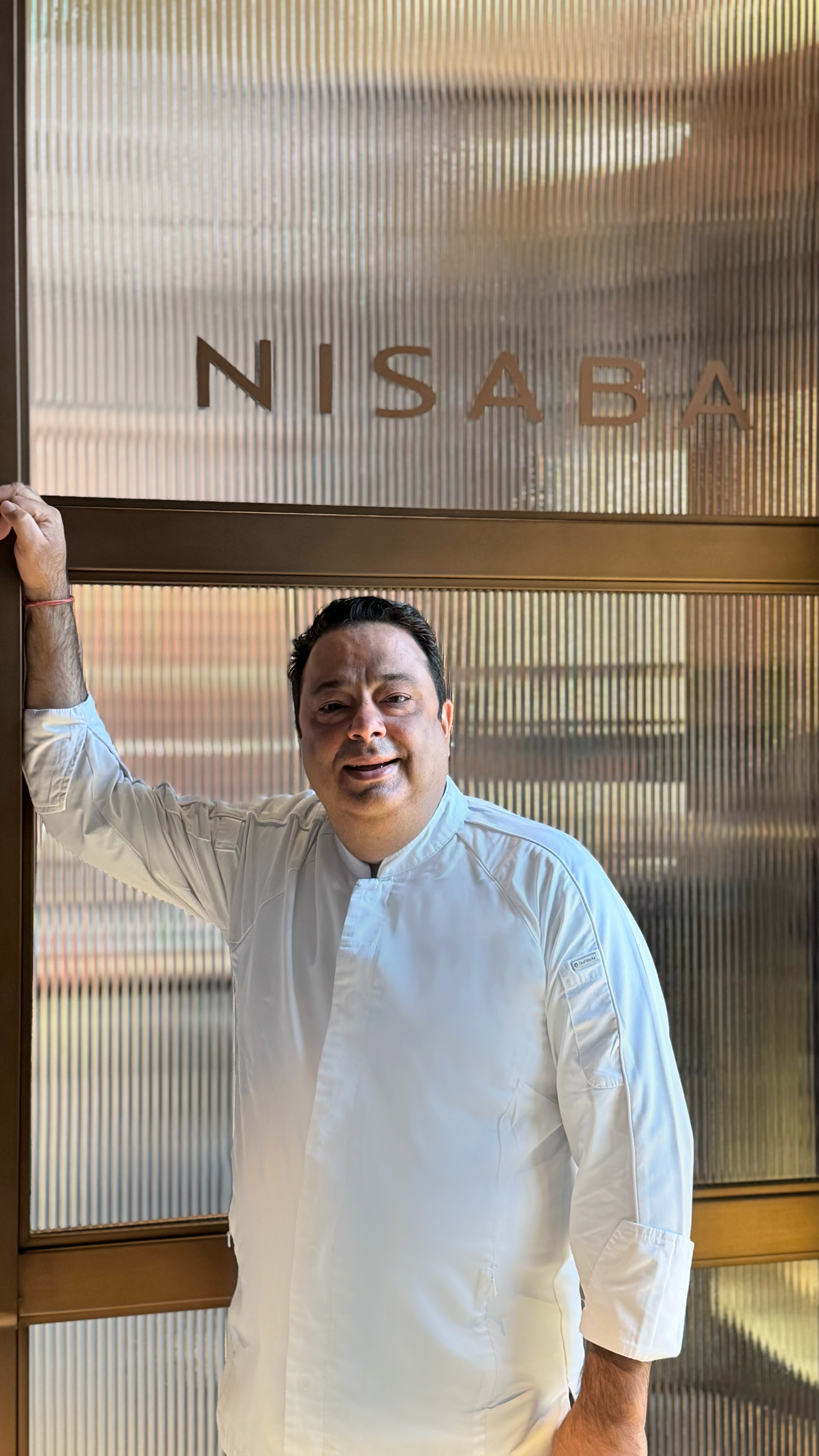
- Born: 20 January 1974 (age 52); Patna, India
- Education: Diploma in Hotel Management
- Occupation: Chef
- Culinary career
- Cooking style: Indian cuisine
- Website: chefmanishmehrotra.com

Manish Mehrotra is an Indian celebrity chef, restaurateur, and cookbook author. In January 2026, Mehrotra opened Nisaba, his first independent restaurant under the Manish Mehrotra Culinary Arts (MMCA) banner, located within the Humayun’s Tomb Museum Complex in Delhi. He previously served as the culinary director of Indian Accent restaurants in Delhi, Mumbai, and New York City, and at Comorin in Gurugram.

== Early life and education ==
Mehrotra was born in Patna, Bihar in 1974. Manish did his schooling from St. Xavier's High School, Patna. After his high school from New Era Public School, New Delhi, he moved to Mumbai to study hotel management from Institute of Hotel Management, Mumbai.

== Career ==
After completing his college in 1996, Manish Mehrotra joined the prestigious Taj Group of Hotels as a Hotel Operations - Management Trainee. He was posted at the Thai Pavilion restaurant where he worked under the guidance of Chef Ananda Solomon at the President Hotel in Mumbai. This is where he mastered the art of Pan-Asian cuisine in the span of four years.

Soon after, in the year 2000, Mehrotra moved back from Mumbai to Delhi and joined Old World Hospitality which at that time managed the hospitality facilities at Habitat World, India Habitat Centre. He was posted at Oriental Octopus, a Members’ only restaurant at Habitat World. Within a span of six months, he became the Chef In-charge of the restaurant.

During his time at the Oriental Octopus, Mehrotra travelled the South Asian region extensively and visited countries including China, South Korea, Thailand, Malaysia and Singapore where he mastered his skills and learned extensively about South East Asian cuisine.

In 2006, Mehrotra moved to London and opened a Pan Asian restaurant for Old World Hospitality to rave reviews. He spent three years in UK and came back to India.

In the year 2009, Mehrotra’s career took a turn as he changed his path and started experimenting with Indian cuisine. This change of events turned in his favour and established him as the pioneer of ‘Modern Indian Cuisine’. In March 2009, he became the founding chef of Indian Accent at The Manor Hotel, New Delhi Indian Accent, an Old World Hospitality concept, offers an inventive approach to Indian cuisine. The original restaurant in New Delhi opened in 2009 to significant acclaim for its path breaking approach to contemporary Indian food. The menu explores progressive ideas in Indian cuisine while maintaining traditional integrity. Mehrotra reinterprets nostalgic Indian dishes with openness towards global techniques and influences.

Indian Accent in New York opened in 2016 to critical and popular acclaim, including being ranked among the Best Restaurants of the year by several media outlets including Zagat, Time Out, Eater, The Village Voice and Thrillist.

In 2018, Mehrotra designed a menu of comfort dishes and unusual food combinations from across the country for Old World Hospitality’s (now a group company of EHV International) Comorin, Gurugram. The restaurant won several awards and is currently amongst the Asia’s 50 Best Restaurants.

Fourteen years after the Delhi outpost, Indian Accent opened in Mumbai in 2023 at NMACC. For the new branch, Mehrotra re-created an elaborate and unique menu keeping in mind the Mumbaikar’s palette. Indian Accent in New Delhi has won several awards and global recognition, including being on the World’s 50 Best list from 2015 to 2023. It has been awarded the San Pellegrino Best Restaurant in India on Asia’s 50 Best list from 2015 to 2022. It has also been rated the No.1 Restaurant in India by Trip Advisor for several consecutive years. It is also part of the Time Magazine, 100 Great Destinations in the World.

After parting ways from Indian Accent in 2024, Mehrotra took a break to explore new opportunities. In January 2026, the chef opened Nisaba, his first independent restaurant under the Manish Mehrotra Culinary Arts (MMCA) banner, backed by partners Amit Khanna and Binny Bansal.

The restaurant is located within the Humayun’s Tomb Museum Complex in Delhi, marking a new chapter in his culinary career.

Manish himself has won several awards during his career.

== Films, TV and guest appearances ==
Apart from being a path-breaking chef and culinary director of Indian Accent, Mehrotra is a notable television personality as well. As a child artist, Mehrotra has acted in the 1983 film ‘Doosri Dulhan’ that stars Shabana Azmi, Sharmila Tagore and Victor Banerjee in lead roles. Apart from this, Mehrotra also played a part in the 1984 film “Apna Bhi Koi Hota”.

Mehrotra is also a well-known TV personality who lifted the trophy of Foodistan a reality cooking show by NDTV Good Times.

Apart from this he has also been invited as a guest on several shows like

- Master Chef India Season 8 (2023)
- Master Chef India Season 7 (2022)
- Master Chef India Season 4 (2015)
- McCain Star Chef Season 1 (2022)
- McCain Star Chef Season 2 (2024)
- We The People
- Jab we met, India Today
- The Journey of India, Discovery
- Diwali Delights with Indian Accent, NDTV
- Hindustan Times Leadership Summit 2022
- TED x NITW
- Good Earth's Chef's Table
- UNICEF India For Children
- GlenfiddichIN India

== Cookbook ==
Manish Mehrotra is the author of ‘Indian Accent Restaurant Cookbook’, which was published by Penguin Books.

The Coffee Table book has pictures by ace photographer Rohit Chawla. The book was launched on January 21, 2016 at the prestigious Jaipur Literature Festival by Shobhaa De. Two editions of the book have already been published.

In 2023, the paperback version of the Indian Accent Restaurant Cookbook was published by Hachette Books.

Manish’s recipes have featured in several cookbooks, magazines, newspapers as well as blogs

== Awards and accolades ==
- Opening of the Year, Nisaba New Delhi – NDTV Food Awards, 2026
- Unlimit Icon – Zee Zest Unlimit Awards, 2026
- Doctor of Philosophy (Ph.D.) – Manav Rachna International Institute of Research & Studies, 2023
- Hall of Fame - Food Superstars - India’s Top 30 Chefs 2023
- Culinary Icon of the year, Travel & Leisure, India 2023
- HELLO! 100 Most Influential: Manish Mehrotra, 2023
- Best Chef In India - Food Superstars - India’s Top 30 Chefs 2022
- Most Admired Chef, World Leadership Congress Awards 2022
- Fellow of the International Institute of Hotel Management, 2021
- Fabelle Chef of The Year, Food Food Awards 2018
- Culinary Excellence - Hello Hall Of Fame 2018
- Chef of the year, Eazy Diner Foodie Awards 2017
- Chef of the year, Powerlist Awards, Living Foodz, 2016
- Jiggs Kalra, Best Chef of the year, Manish Mehrotra
- Excellence Award for Shining The World's Spotlight On India - Condé Nast Traveller India Readers’ Travel Awards 2014
- Disciples of Escoffier International, 2014
- Winner – NDTV Foodistan (India Vs Pakistan) 2012
- Chef of the year, Indian Restaurant Awards 2012
- Chef of the year, Vir Sanghvi Awards, HT City, Hindustan Times, 2012
- Gourmet Guru of India, Food & Nightlife Magazine 2011
- American Express - Best Chef Of The Year 2010
- No. 1 Chef In India - The Economic Times, 2010
- Chef of the year, Vir Sanghvi Awards, HT City, Hindustan Times, 2010
- Teacher’s Golden Thistle Awards
- Better Kitchen Awards - Promoting Indian Cuisines Worldwide

== See also ==
- Sabyasachi Gorai
- Ranveer Brar
