= Artemis Simopoulos =

American physician and endocrinologist

Artemis P. Simopoulos is an American physician and endocrinologist, who authored several books on diet and nutrition. She is the founder and president of the non-profit educational organization Center for Genetics, Nutrition and Health since 1990 and a founding member of the International Society for the Study of Fatty Acids and Lipids in 1991. She is a researcher who publishes on diet and health, and organizes conferences on the subject. She is noted for her work on polyunsaturated fat. She was also the chair of the nutrition coordinating committee of the National Institute of Health for nine years.
