= Kurush Dalal =

Indian archaeologist and culinary anthropologist

Kurush F. Dalal
- Education: Deccan College, Pune University (Ph.D.)
- Occupations: Archaeologist; historian; culinary anthropologist
- Title: Director of School of Archaeology of INSTUCEN (India Study Center) Trust

Kurush Dalal is an Indian archaeologist, historian and culinary anthropologist. He is based in Mumbai, Maharashtra.

== Education and career ==
Dalal has a Ph.D. in Early Iron Age in Rajasthan from Deccan College, Pune University. He was a faculty at University of Mumbai, and led the Salsette Explorations Project that documented the archaeology of Mumbai.

Dalal is the director of School of Archaeology of INSTUCEN (India Study Center) Trust in Mumbai.

Dalal combines his knowledge of archaeology and history with his passion for cooking to research foods. He has helped popularize these fields by organizing various projects and workshops.
