= Ragda pattice =

Popular Indian street food

Ragda patties
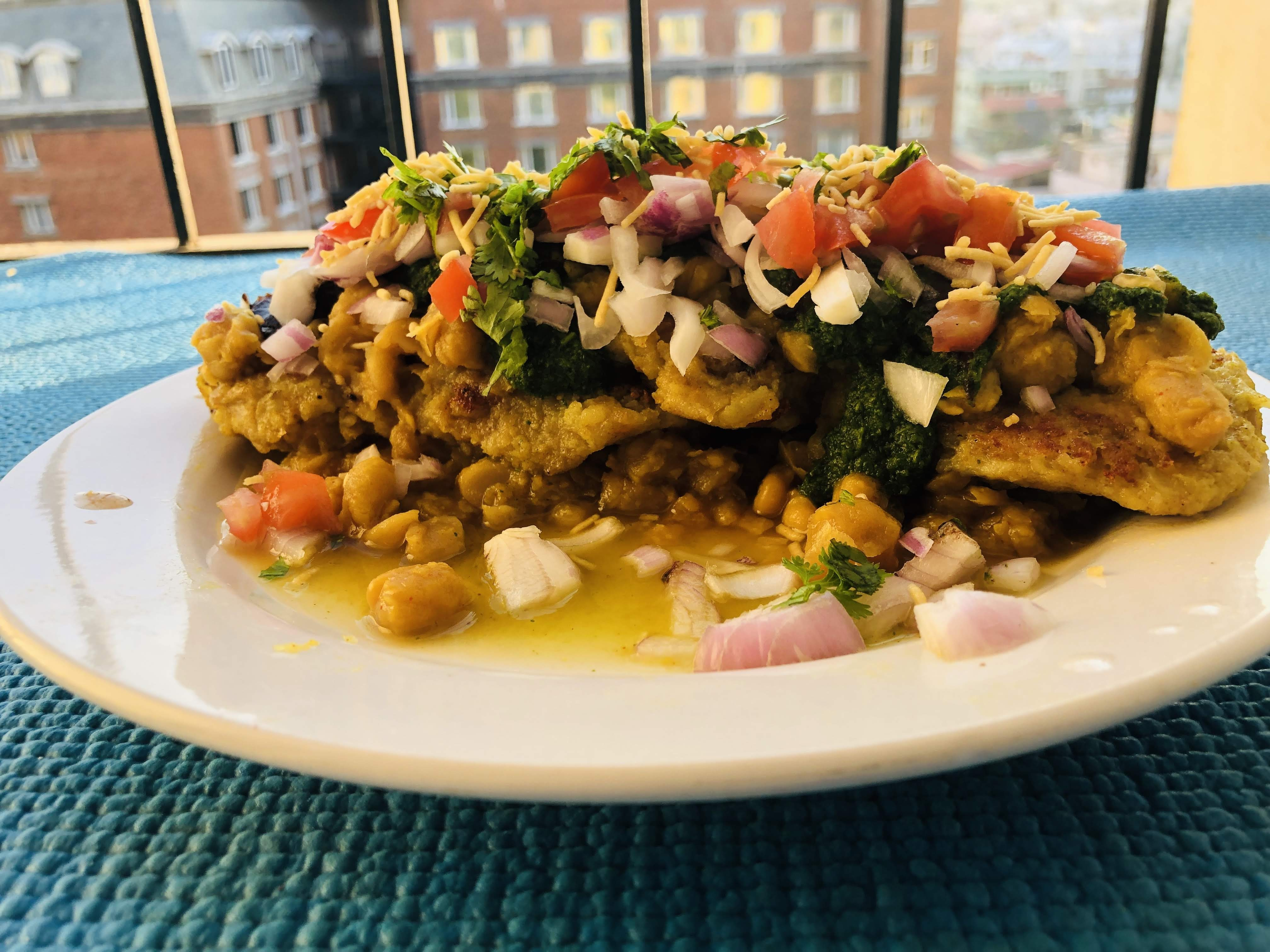
- Place of origin: India
- Region or state: Maharashtra, Gujarat
- Main ingredients: yellow peas, potatoes, spices
- Variations: Samosa ragda, chhole tikki

Ragda patties (colloquially ragda pattice, IPA: [ɾəɡɽaː]) is a dish of mashed potato patties and pea sauce, and is part of the street food culture in the Indian states of Maharashtra and Gujarat. It is similar to chhole tikki, more popular in North India. This dish is a popular street food offering and is also served at restaurants that offer Indian fast food. Pattice may be a localization of the English word 'patties', and refers to the potato cakes at the heart of the dish.

== Preparation ==
This dish is a two-part preparation: ragda (gravy) and patties. Ragda is a light stew of rehydrated dried white peas cooked with a variety of spices. Patties are simple mashed potato cakes. In contrast to North Indian tikkis, patties are usually not spiced, only salted. To serve, two patties are placed in a bowl or plate, covered with some ragda, and garnished with finely chopped onions, coriander leaves, green chutney, tamarind chutney, and sev (crunchy gram flour noodles).

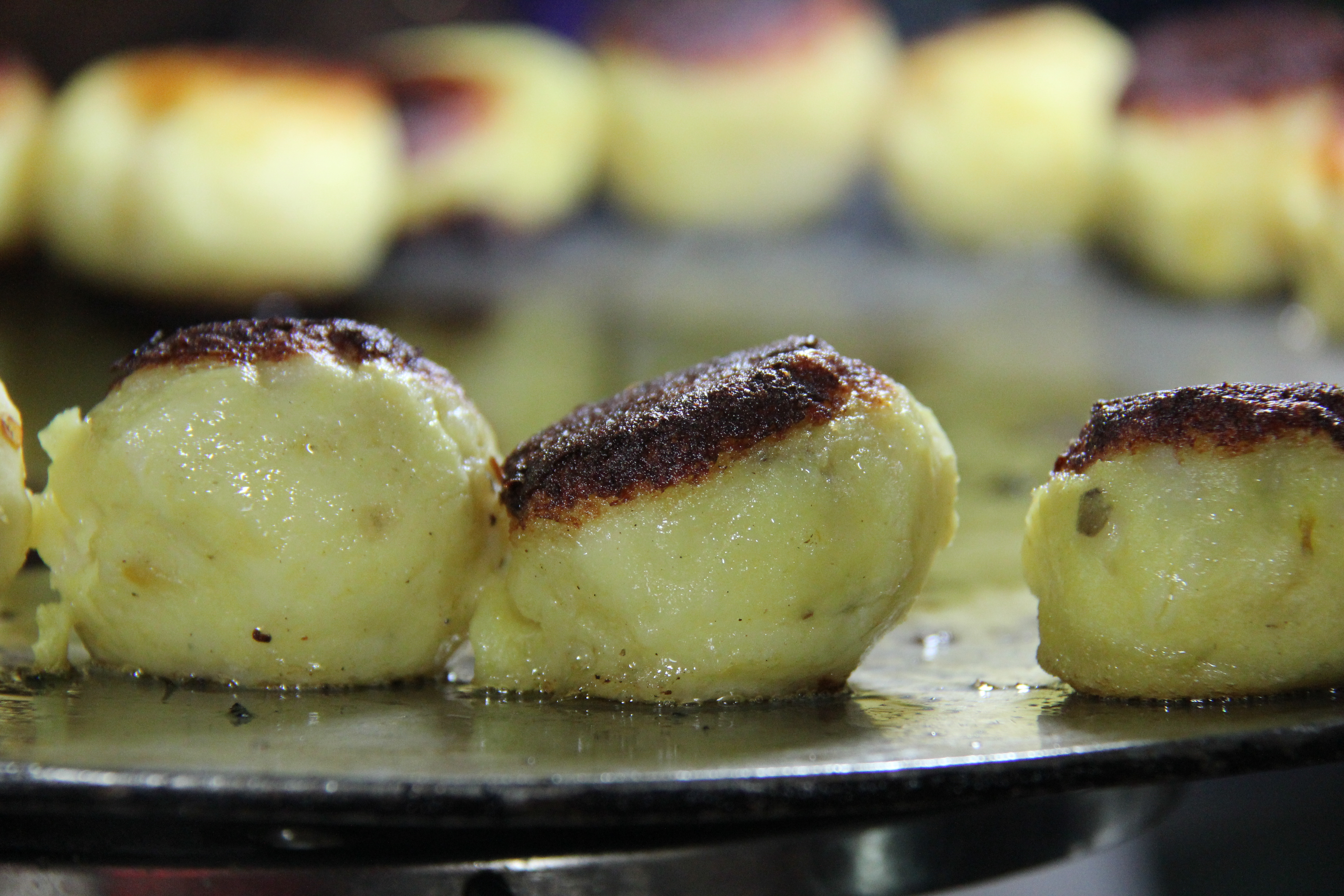
Patties being prepared by street vendor in Powai

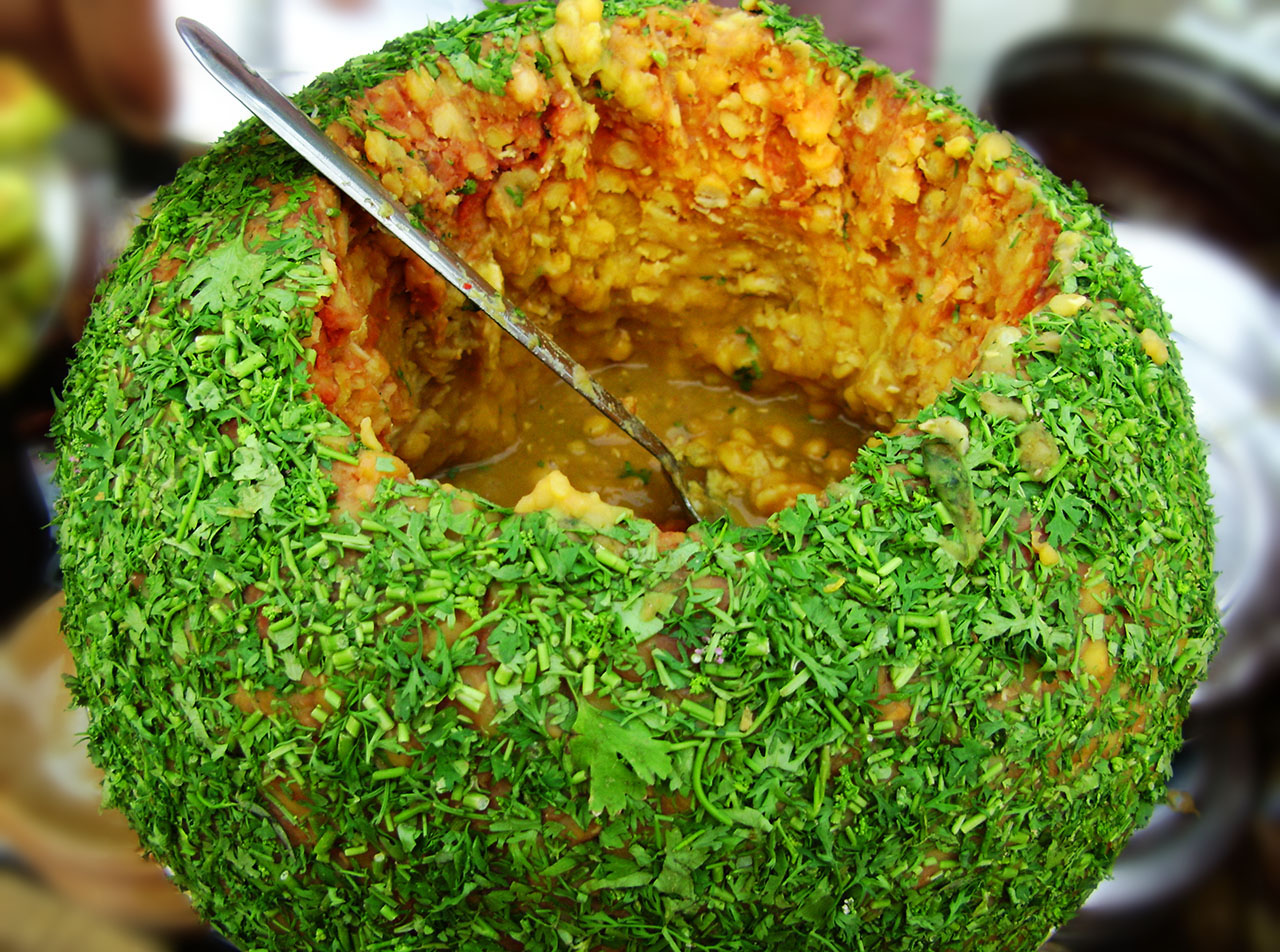
Ragda curry contained in a giant dry ball of ragda

== See also ==
- Curry powder
- Masala
- List of legume dishes
- List of potato dishes
