= Paratha =

Flatbread from South Asia

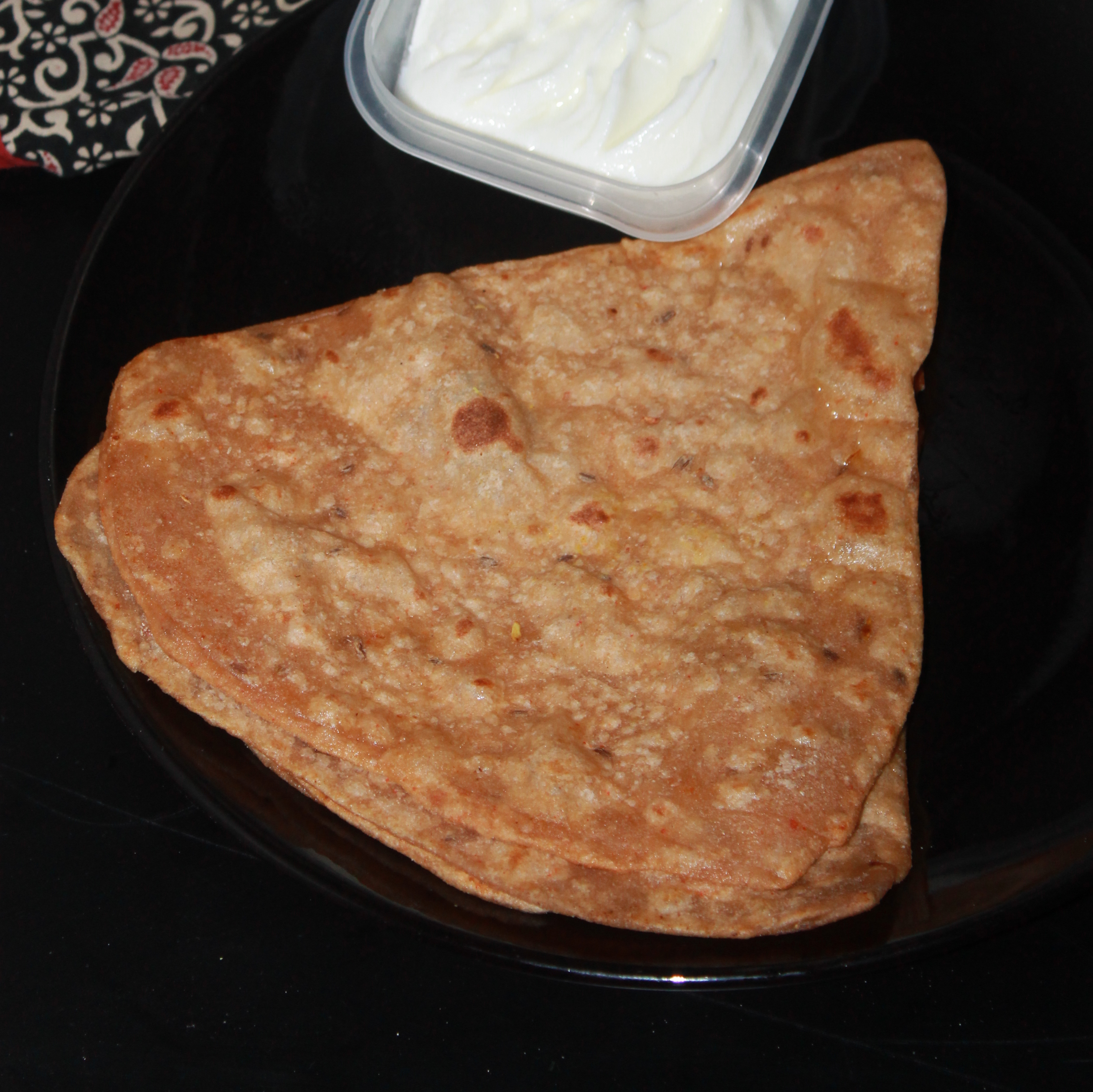
- Plain paratha
- Alternative names: Parotta (South India/Sri Lanka); Porota (Bengal); Buss-up-shut/oil roti (Caribbean); Farata (Mauritius); Palata (Myanmar)
- Type: Flatbread
- Course: Breakfast or other meal
- Region or state: Northern Indian Subcontinent
- Associated cuisine: India, Bangladesh, Brunei, Guyana, Indonesia, Pakistan, Singaporean, South Africa, Sri Lanka, Suriname, Maldives, Malaysia, Mauritius, Myanmar, Thailand Trinidad and Tobago
- Main ingredients: Atta (or maida), ghee (or oil), water, salt
- Ingredients generally used: Various stuffings (such as potato, cauliflower, or radish)
- Variations: Parotta, Mughlai paratha, Dhakai paratha, kathi roll, paratha roll, Roti canai, Roti (wrap)
- Similar dishes: Chapati, thepla

Paratha (Hindustani pronunciation: [pəˈɾaːʈʰaː, pəˈɾãːʈʰaː], also known by other spellings) is a flatbread from the Indian subcontinent, consisting of a wheat dough, typically whole wheat, that is folded and rolled with ghee, forming multiple layers, and shallow fried. Paratha may be stuffed with various fillings, the most common being potato. Paratha is one of the most popular flatbreads in India. The folded, whole-wheat version is prevalent in the Northern Indian subcontinent, and is distinct from South Indian parotta, which uses refined flour. Variations also exist in the cuisines of Myanmar (where it is known as palata), Mauritius (where it is known as farata), Malaysia (where it is known as roti canai), Singapore (where it is known as roti prata), South Africa, and the Caribbean (where it is also known as buss-up-shut or oil roti).

Although paratha is sometimes said to have originated in Punjabi cuisine, it may have evolved from similar flatbreads from regions connected to India via the Silk Road. Possible origins include the Persian flatbread waraki or from breads introduced by Arabs in India. Sanskrit recipes for versions of paratha appeared in the 12th century. The popularity of paratha increased during the Mughal Empire, which introduced it across the region. During the British imperial era, indentured workers from India introduced paratha to Southeast Asia, the Caribbean, and Mauritius. In India, several versions of paratha were popularised after the 1947 partition.

Paratha is eaten as the central component of a meal, with various accompaniments, often including dahi and pickle. Paratha is eaten for any meal; for breakfast, it is commonly paired with tea. Some types of paratha are made with spiraling layers, such as lachha paratha. Stuffed parathas include aloo paratha, using potatoes; gobhi paratha, using cauliflower; mooli paratha, using radish; methi paratha, using fenugreek leaves, and keema paratha, using minced meat. Paratha is also used for wraps, including the kathi roll and paratha roll.

== Names ==
The word paratha is from Hindi, derived from the word para, meaning 'layer'. In Indian English, the bread is always referred to by the specific term paratha, rather than bread.

The word for paratha differs across India. Alternative spellings include parantha, prantha, parata, prata, and parotta. It is spelled as palata (Burmese pronunciation: [pəlàtà]) in Myanmar and farata in Mauritius. In the Gulf countries, as well as in East Africa, the breads referred to as chapati are more similar to a paratha.

== Preparation ==
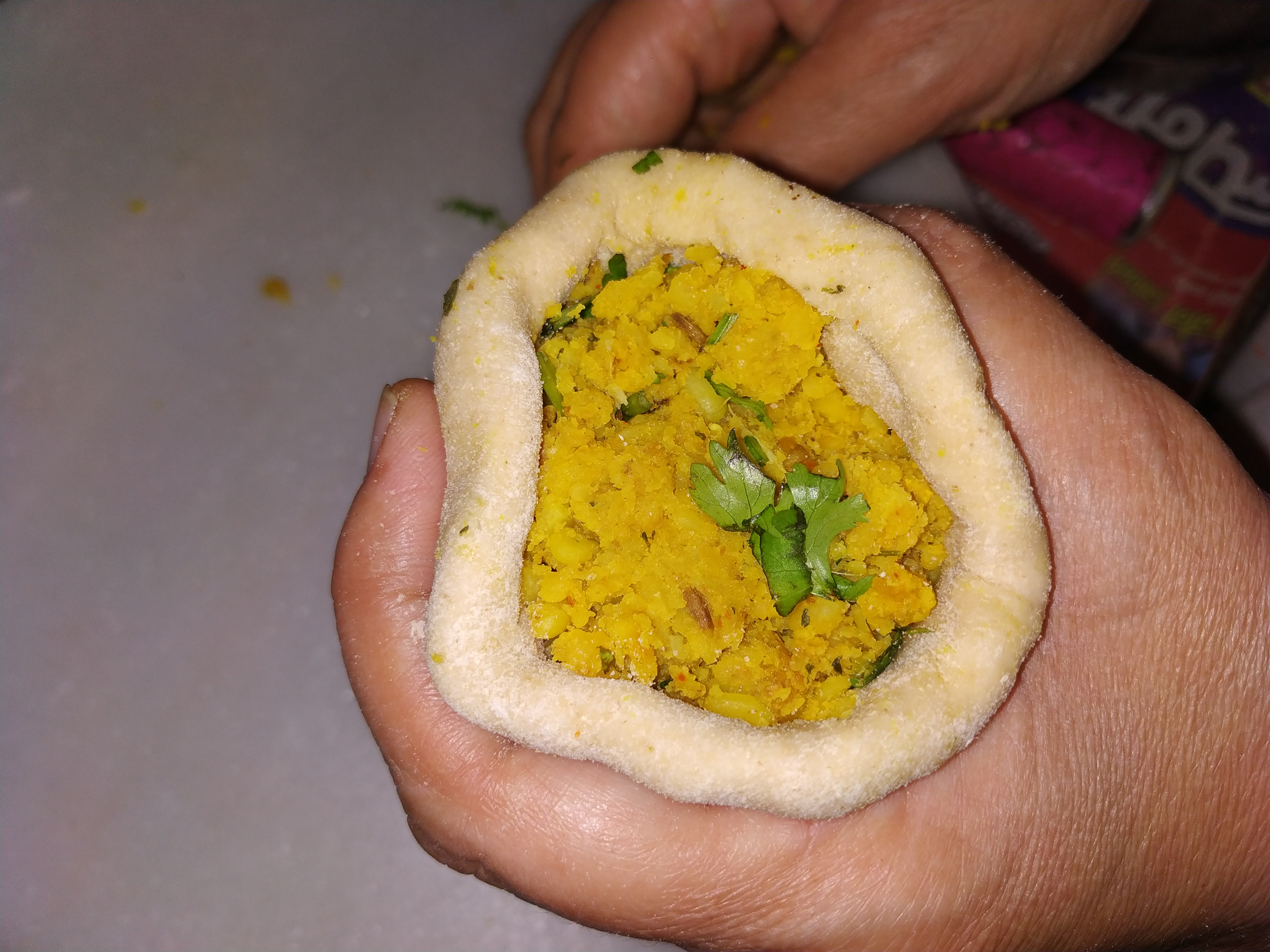
Stuffed parathas are made by placing a filling into dough before rolling it out.

Like most Indian breads, paratha is wheat-based and unleavened. The dough is made of atta (whole wheat flour), water, and salt, which is covered in ghee. Oil may be used instead of ghee, and white flour (maida) may be used instead of whole wheat; maida is used for more tender, flaky parathas. Vegetables, herbs, and spices may be added; ajowan is a commonly used spice in plain paratha.

The common wheat, the dominant species of wheat in the northern Indian subcontinent, results in the light, spongy texture of North Indian breads such as paratha. The flour used in paratha is typically of low extraction, although high-extraction flour is sometimes used. It may also use resultant atta, the coarse byproduct of sifting atta. In commercial preparations, potato flakes may be used as a binding agent.

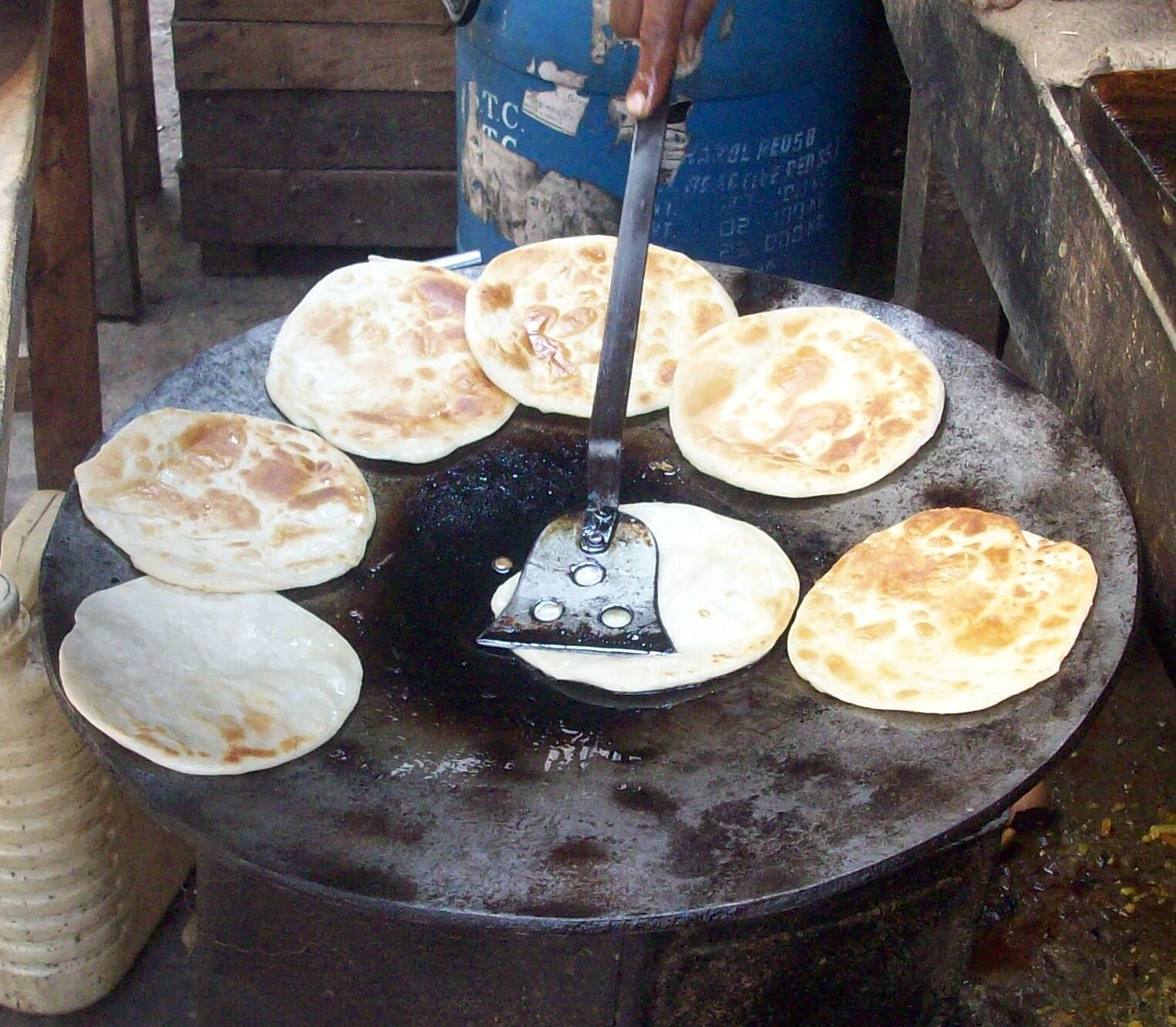
Paratha is shallow fried on a tava.

The dough is kneaded by hand. It is rolled out with oil or ghee, then folded. This process of lamination is performed two or more times. This usually forms a triangle with four to six layers; it may also be folded into a circle or square. Stuffed versions of paratha are instead made by shaping the dough into balls and placing a filling inside before rolling them out. Paratha may be rolled out using a dough sheeting machine that may produce thousands of parathas per hour.

Both plain and stuffed parathas are shallow fried on a tava, a type of iron griddle, until browned, with or without additional ghee. Sometimes, particularly among street vendors, paratha is fried in a shallow pan filled with oil, thus containing more fat than a paratha cooked on a tava. Some versions are instead baked. Paratha may be brushed with ghee after serving.

While frying, paratha forms distinct layers. The lamination of the dough results in a soft, flaky flatbread. Its lamination process and layered texture are much like a puff pastry, but it does not rise as a puff pastry does. Frying (rather than baking) results in a slightly crispy outside, and, in the absence of leavening, the formation of steam is responsible for the separation of crust and crumb.

Paratha is similar to chapati, with the only difference in physical composition being the use of oil, while paratha also has multiple layers. Paratha is slightly thicker and denser, with a more prominent crumb. The starch properties of the two breads differ as paratha has fat in its crumb as well as fat coverage that causes more thorough heat transfer. Paratha has starch granules in its crumb that are deformed and shrunken compared to those of chapati. The Gujarati bread thepla resembles a cross between paratha and chapati.

Paratha is the same size as chapati; a single paratha weighs about 140 grams (4.9 oz). Both plain and stuffed parathas are about 15 centimetres (5.9 in) in diameter and 3 mm thick, with plain parathas sometimes ranging to as thin as 2.5 mm. Paratha has a sturdy texture, enabling it to be served with thick foods. Stuffed paratha has a softer texture than plain paratha.

Paratha is eaten quickly; a study in the journal Appetite found that it took about 9 minutes to eat a 250-calorie serving. According to a 2020 study in Delhi, the median portion size of paratha is 60 grams, averaging 1 paratha for women and 2 parathas for men. According to a 2013 study in the United Kingdom, the mean portion size is 121 grams for children and 100 grams for adults.

== Varieties ==
Paratha exists in both plain and stuffed varieties. Dozens of varieties are commonly consumed. Regional variations differ based on cooking method or filling.

=== Plain varieties ===
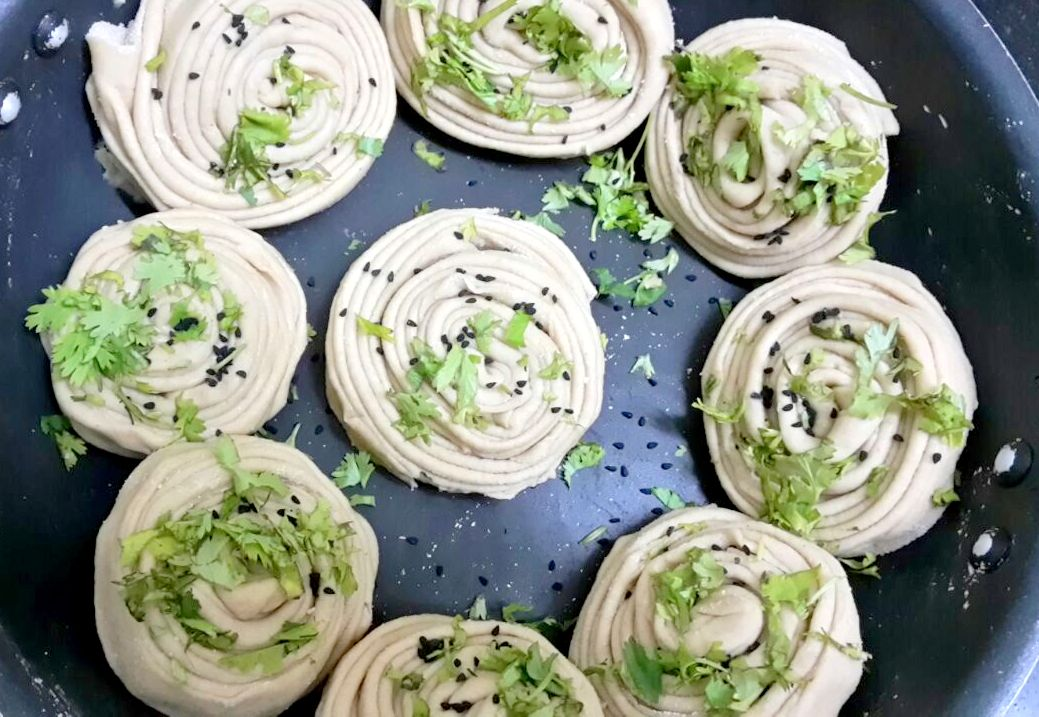
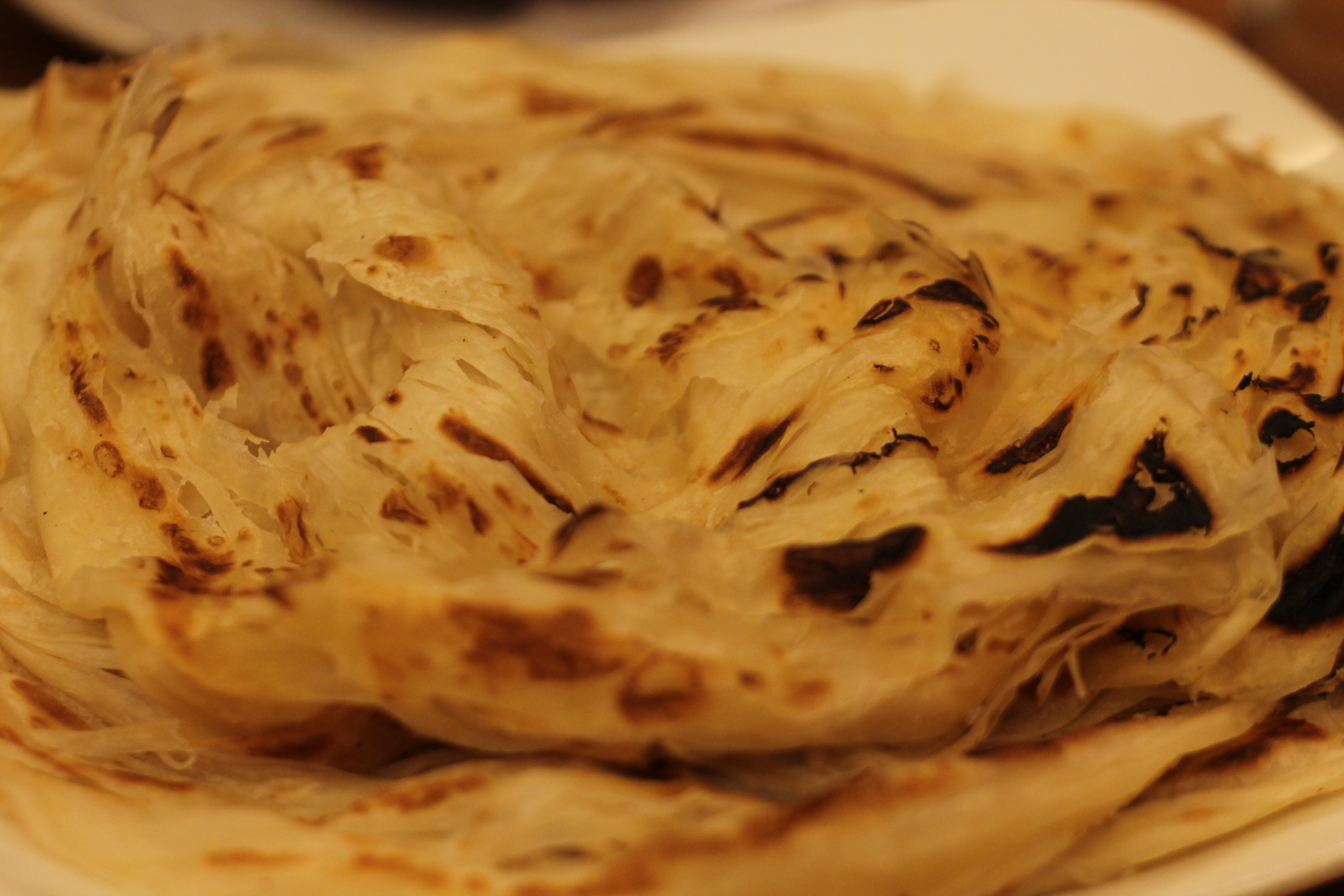
Lachha paratha has circular spiraling layers.

India has two categories of plain paratha: North Indian paratha (also known as sada paratha), made from atta, and South Indian parotta, made from maida. Both are similarly flaky and layered, but the South Indian version achieves this texture through repeated stretching and coiling rather than rolling and folding.

Some versions of paratha have spiraling layers, forming a circle or square. Lachha paratha (lit. 'layered paratha') is a kind of North Indian paratha with many circular layers, formed by shaping a circle of dough into a coil before rolling it out again. It has a crispy texture and is the same size as a regular paratha. Ulte tave ke paratha is a North Indian paratha cooked on the bottom side of the pan, the same method as roomali roti.

Cornmeal, atta, palm sugar, ajowan, and green chilli are used to make makkai paratha, while ginger and chilli are used for adraki mirchi paratha. Sattu, a type of chickpea flour, is used to make sattu paratha, a breakfast dish eaten in Bihar, Jharkhand, and part of Uttar Pradesh. In the Eastern Himalayas, the legume gahat is crushed into a paste that is added to paratha dough. Paratha has been made with atypical ingredients for nutritional value. For example, it may be made with mulberry leaves as a nutritional supplement, which also increases shelf stability of the flour. Other ingredients that may sometimes be used in the dough include amaranth, flaxseed, sorghum flour, and buckwheat flour.

=== Stuffed varieties ===
Many varieties of stuffed paratha exist. The most common is aloo paratha, with a spiced potato filling. Aloo paratha uses ingredients such as coriander leaf and green chilli and spices such as amchoor and garam masala, and its proportion of dough to filling may vary. Along with aloo paratha, the stuffed parathas common in Punjabi cuisine are gobhi paratha, with cauliflower, and mooli paratha, with radish. Keema paratha uses keema (minced meat), such as lamb, while methi paratha uses fenugreek leaves. (Note: Methi paratha may use kasuri methi, an herb related to fenugreek.) Other common fillings include peas (matar), onions, spinach, and paneer. Aloo palak paratha contains both potatoes and spinach. Dal paratha is stuffed with cooked dal such as mung beans. Pudina paratha uses mint. Sweet parathas include gurh ka paratha (jaggery paratha).

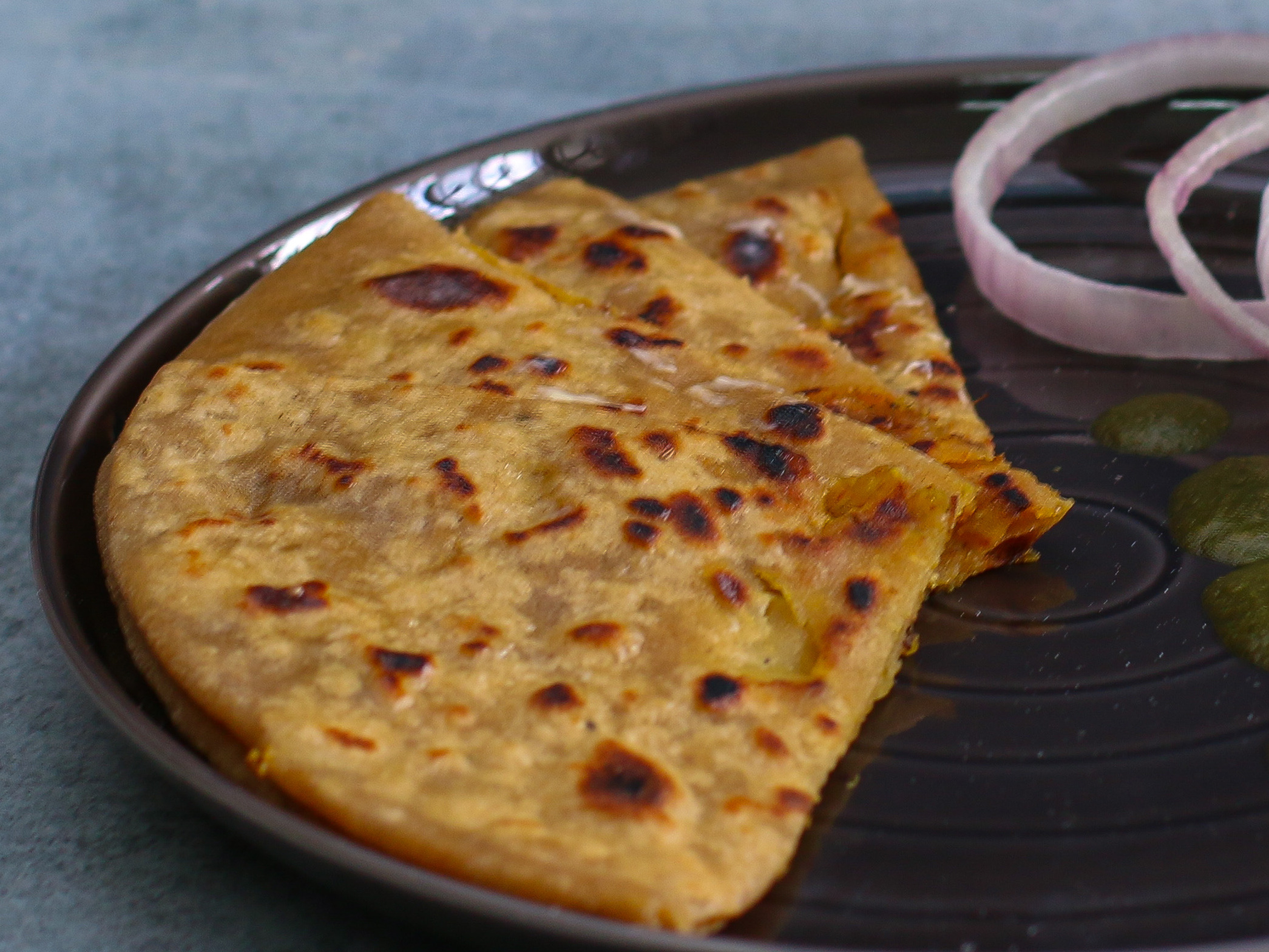
Aloo paratha

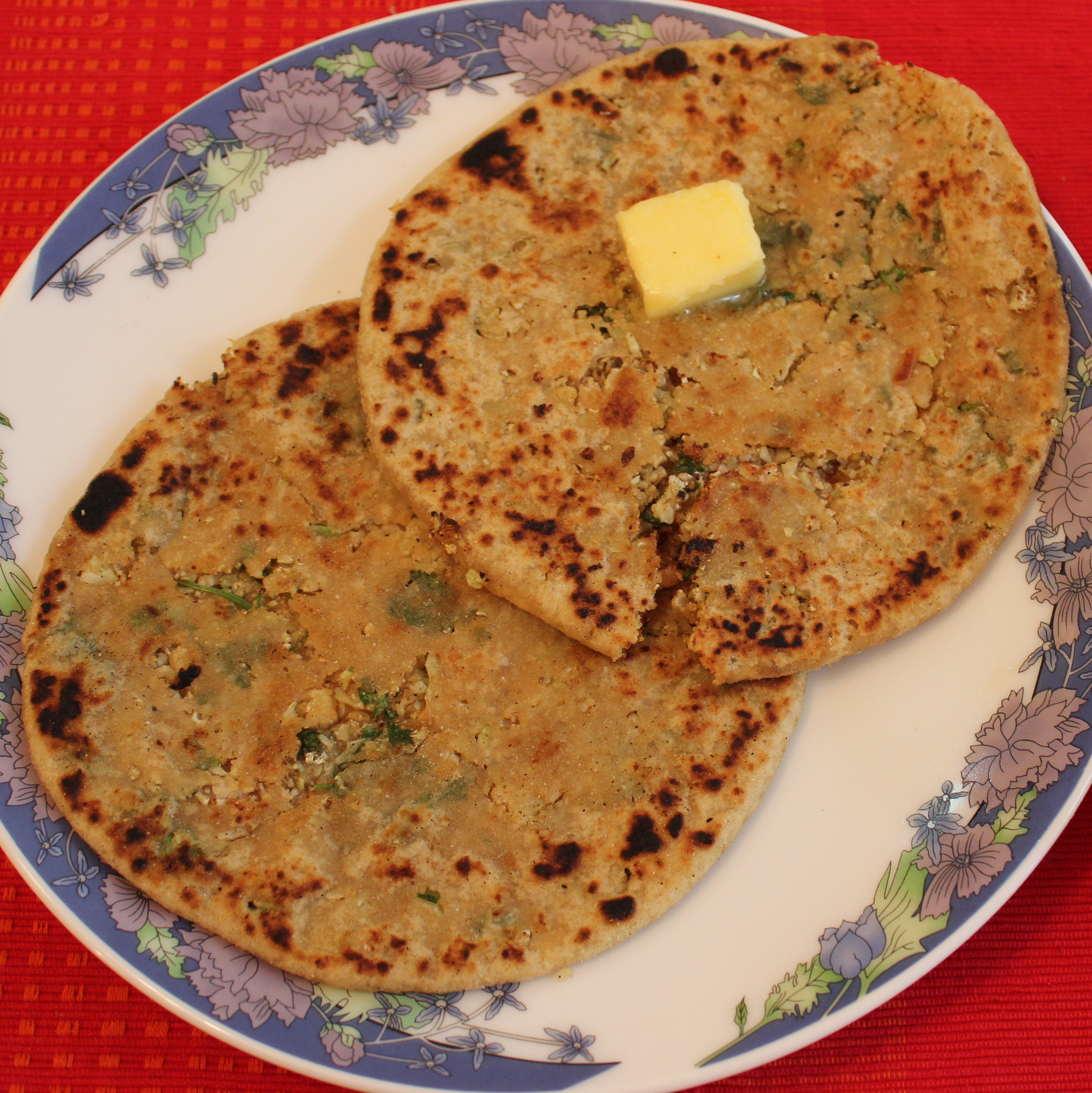
Gobhi paratha

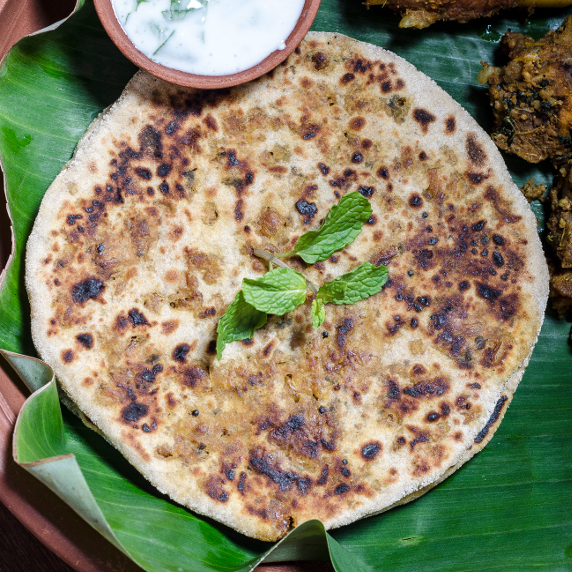
Keema paratha

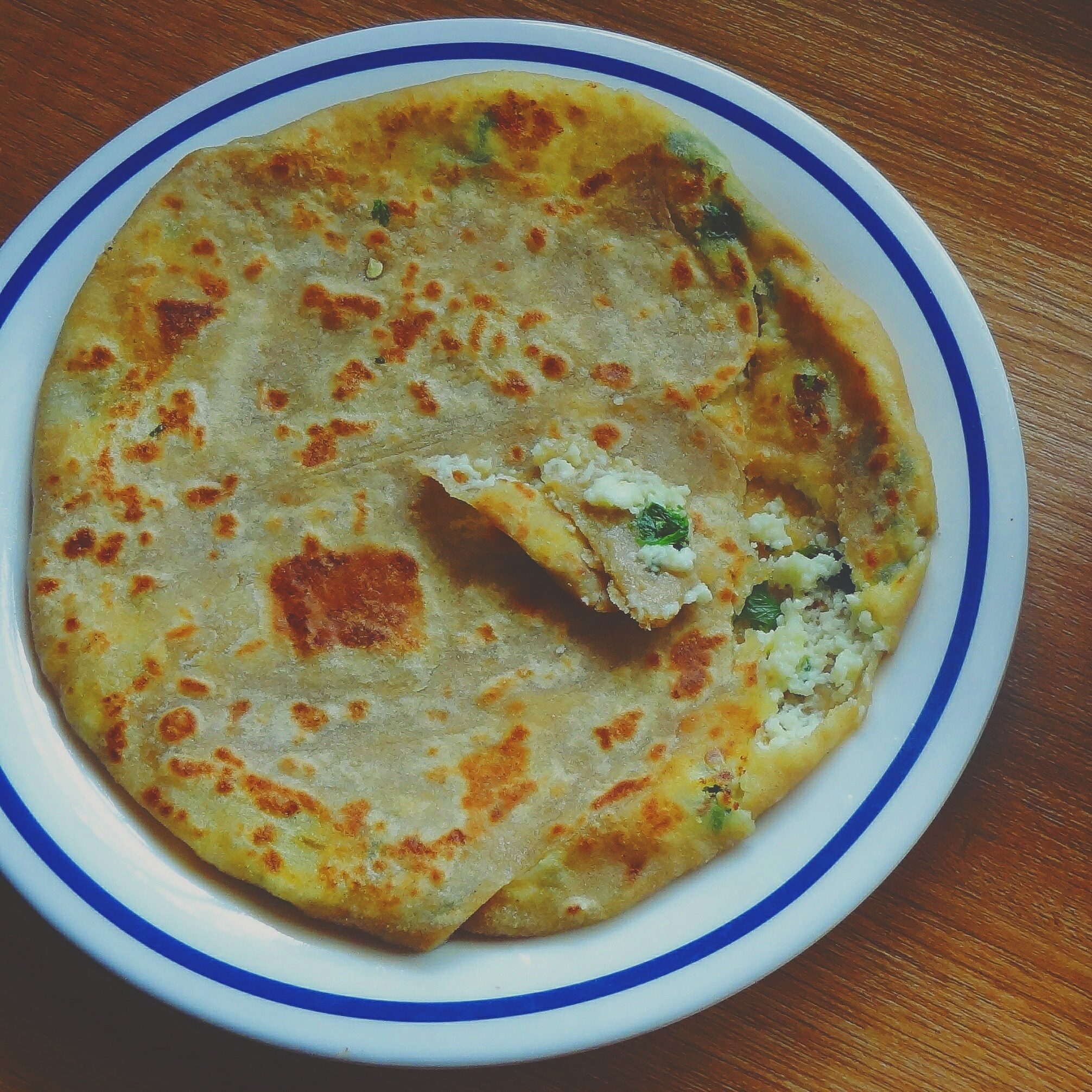
Paneer paratha

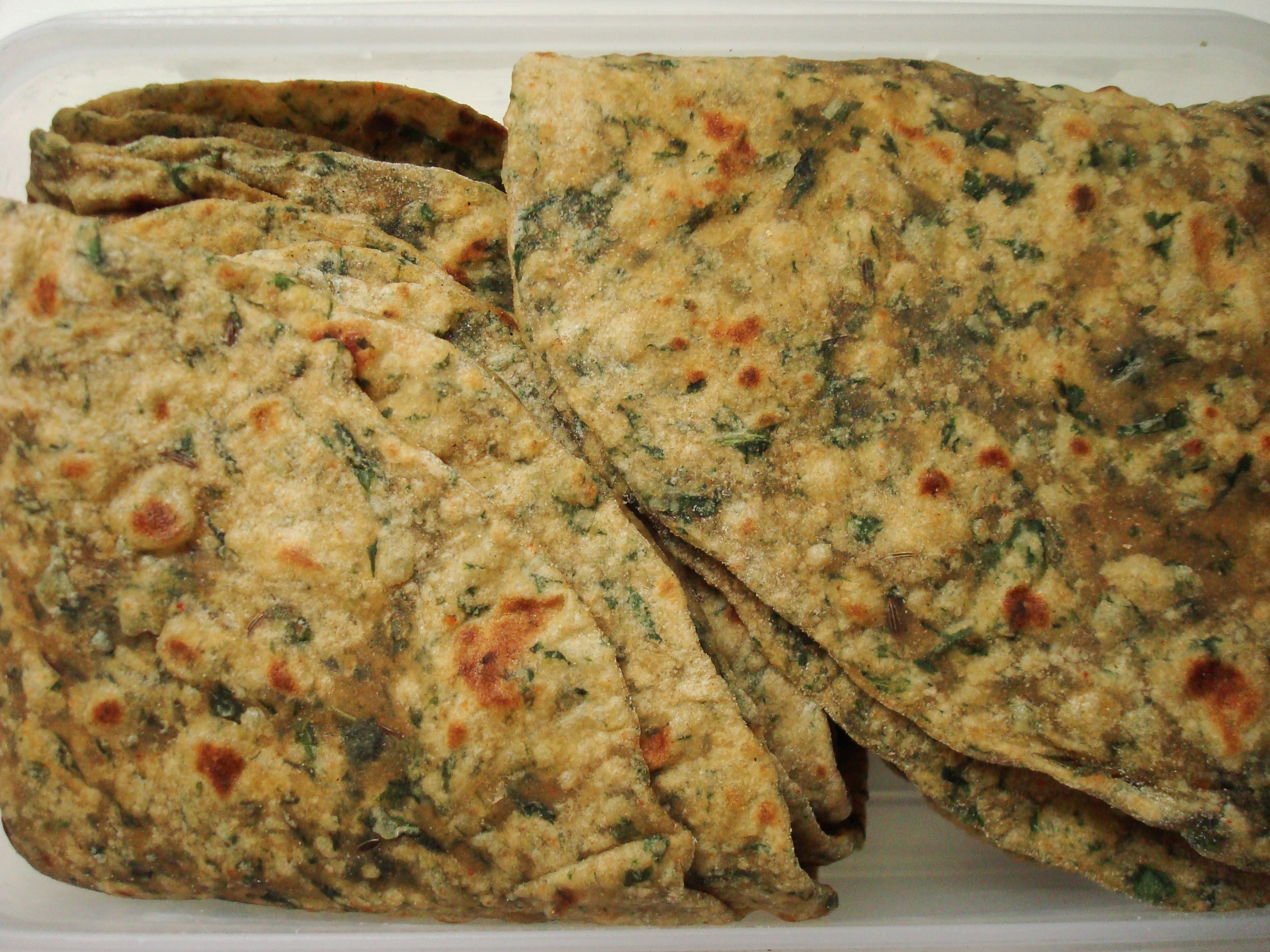
Methi paratha

Anda paratha contains beaten eggs; the paratha may simply be coated in eggs, or it may have a filling of eggs, onions, chilli, coriander seed, and ginger added during frying. Anda paratha is a common Punjabi breakfast. Among the Sunni Bohras of Gujarat, egg paratha, known as baida paratha, is a festive food.

In Punjabi cuisine, stuffed parathas are often prepared from leftovers. For example, paratha filled with leftover rice dishes is known as chawal ka paratha. Bathua paratha has dough mixed with the boiled leaf vegetable bathua and green chilli. This is eaten as breakfast in winter in North India. Paratha stuffed with besan (chickpea flour) is known as birahi. A type of paratha from Chhattisgarh uses a dough with wheat flour, rice flour, and leaf vegetables. Khoa (milk solids) may also be a paratha filling. Modern variations of paratha use ingredients such as cheese, mushrooms, or soya, and meat fillings are used for some fusion versions of paratha.

=== Regional variants ===
The version eaten in the South Indian cuisines of Karnataka and Tamil Nadu is like a chapati made of maida. South Indian variations called Malabar parotta and Ceylon parotta resemble lachha paratha. Malabar parotta, from the cuisine of Kerala, has layers formed by kneading oil into the dough. Another preparation from Kerala is kothu parotta, a mixture of chopped parotta with other ingredients. Veechu parotta is a square-shaped parotta eaten in Tamil Nadu. Ceylon parotta is similar to this, with the addition of a minced meat filling. Madurai, Tamil Nadu, has a variant called bun parotta, shaped like a bun. Bidar, Karnataka, is home to the Bidari paratha, distinguished from regular paratha by the addition of a small amount of semolina flour.

South Asian parotta
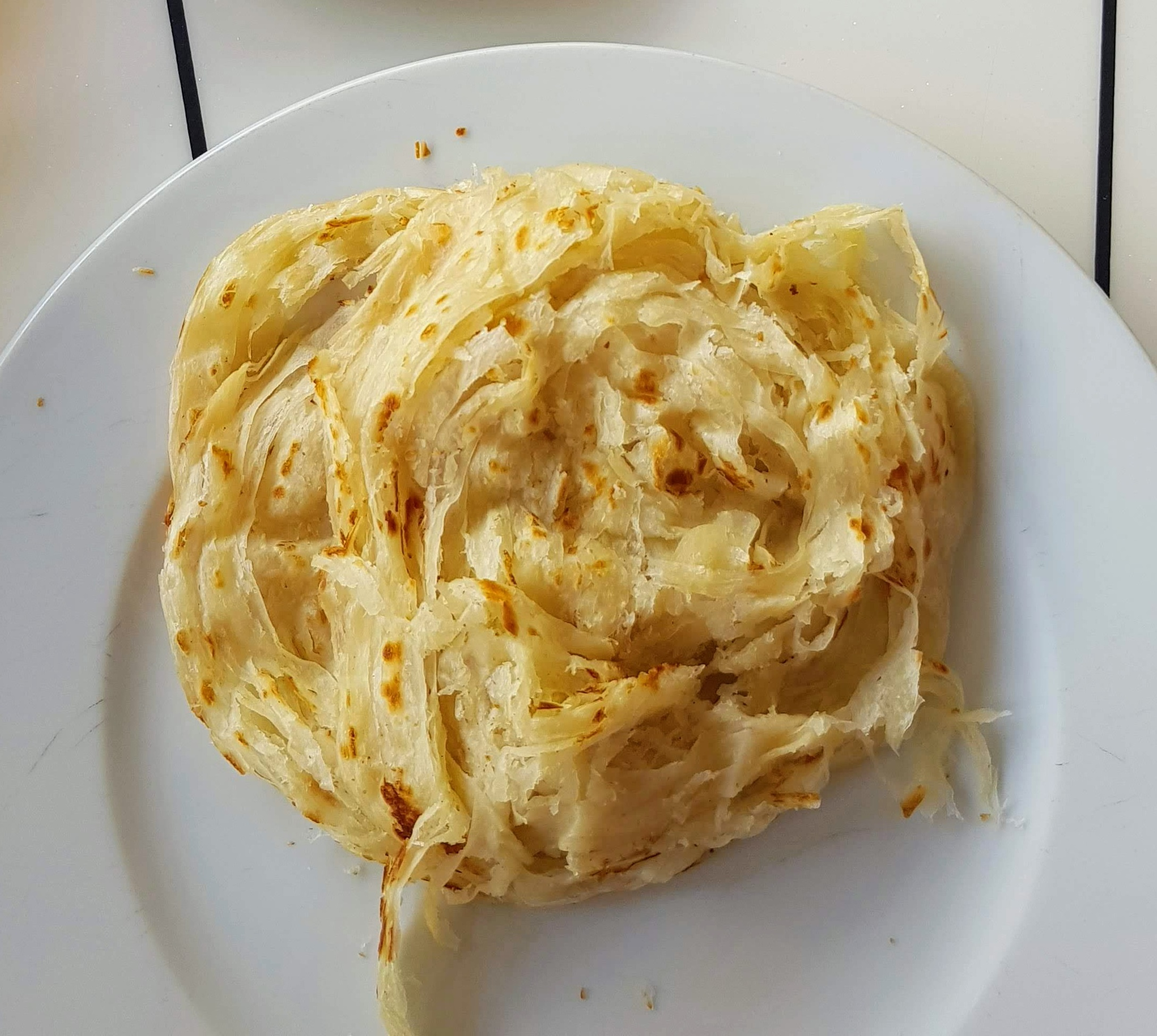
Malabar parotta

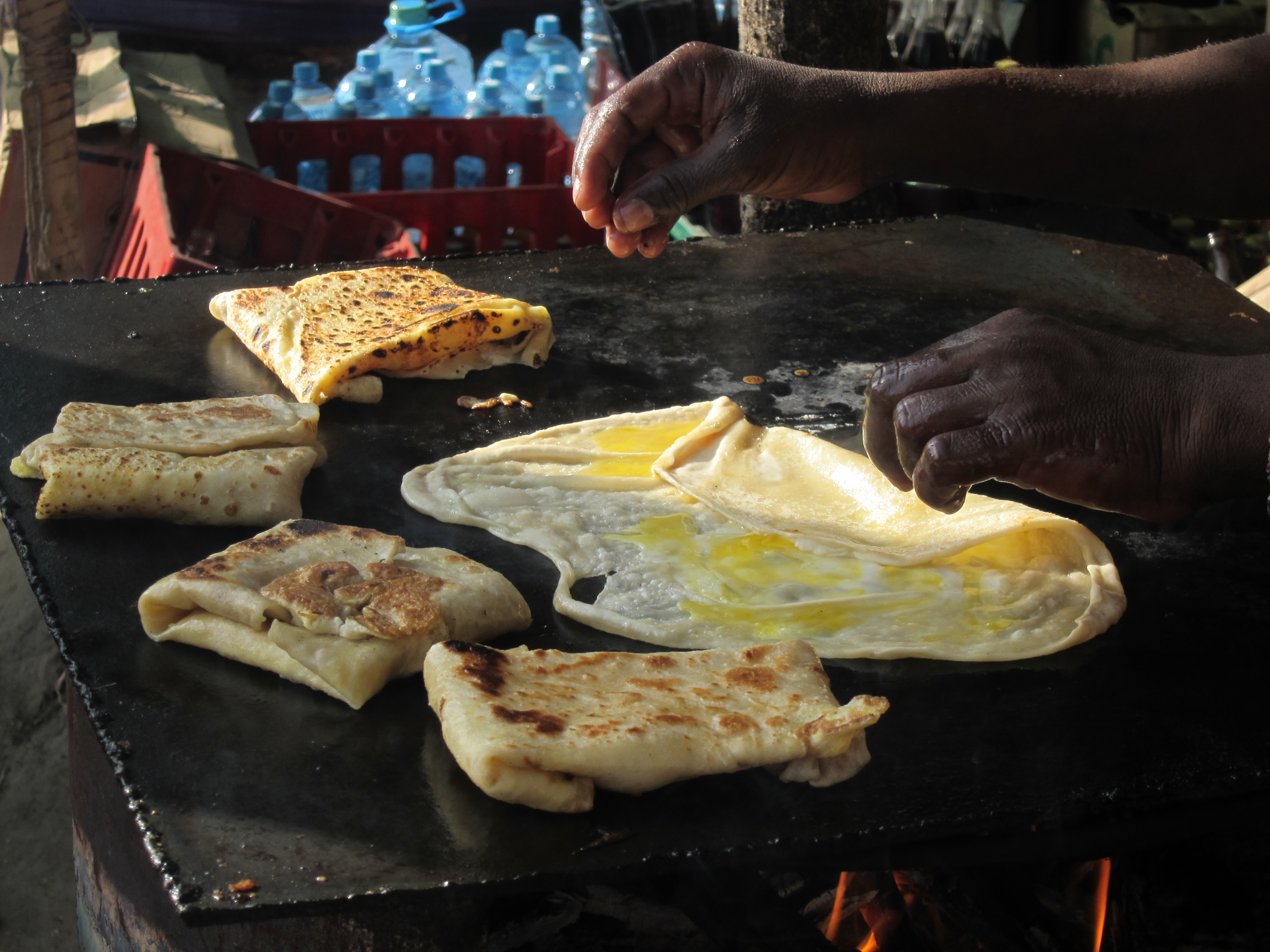
Veechu parotta

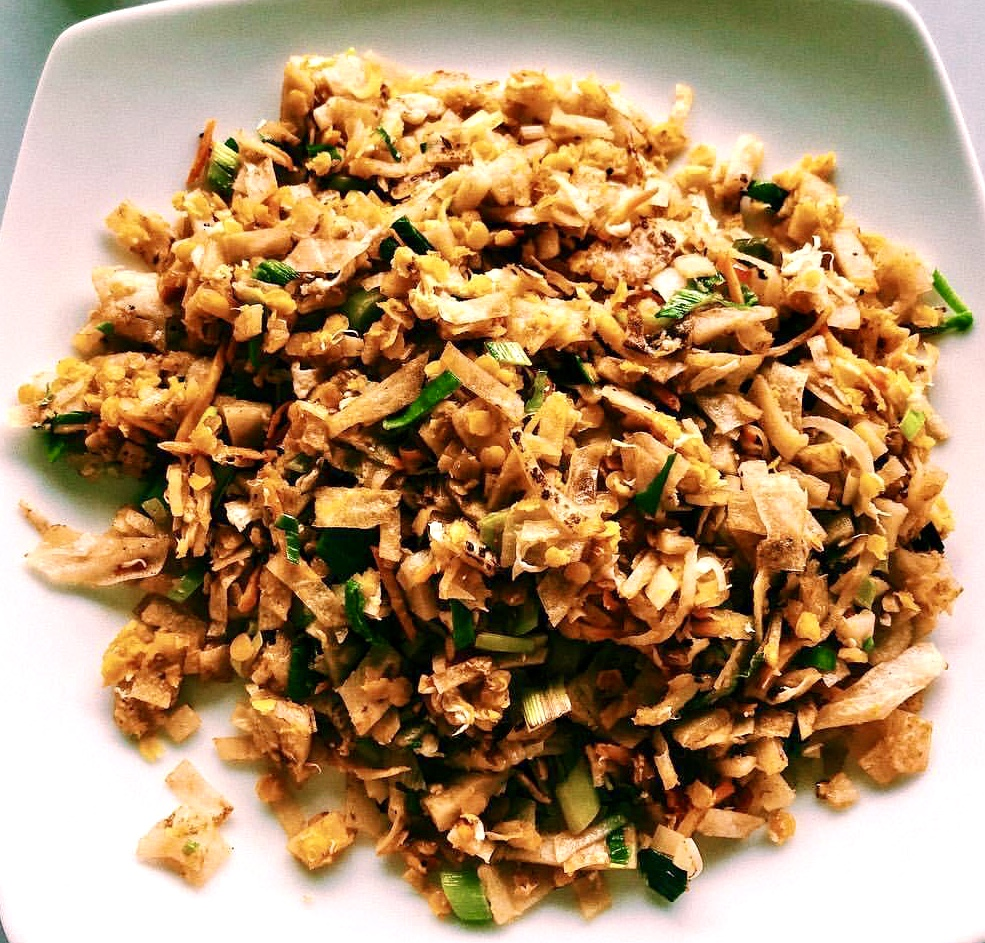
Kothu parotta

In Bengali cuisine, the typical paratha—or porota—is triangular and usually combines atta and maida. This is common among both Hindu and Muslim Bengalis. Circular parathas also exist in the region, with five or six layers. The Dhakai paratha is deep-fried and has many layers, with a hollow centre. Taking its name from Dhaka, Bangladesh, it is also found in Kolkata, India. Mughlai paratha, a dish from Kolkata, which is prepared by folding a paratha over a filling with beaten eggs and chopped onions, sometimes with minced meat. It is one of the more complex forms of stuffed paratha. Another Bengali version, petai porota (lit. 'beaten paratha'), is tossed and torn apart after cooking, resembling kothu parotta. It is a common street food meal, served with ghugni or aloo dum, and is eaten for breakfast. Vendors sell petai porota by weight.

Paratha in Bengali cuisine
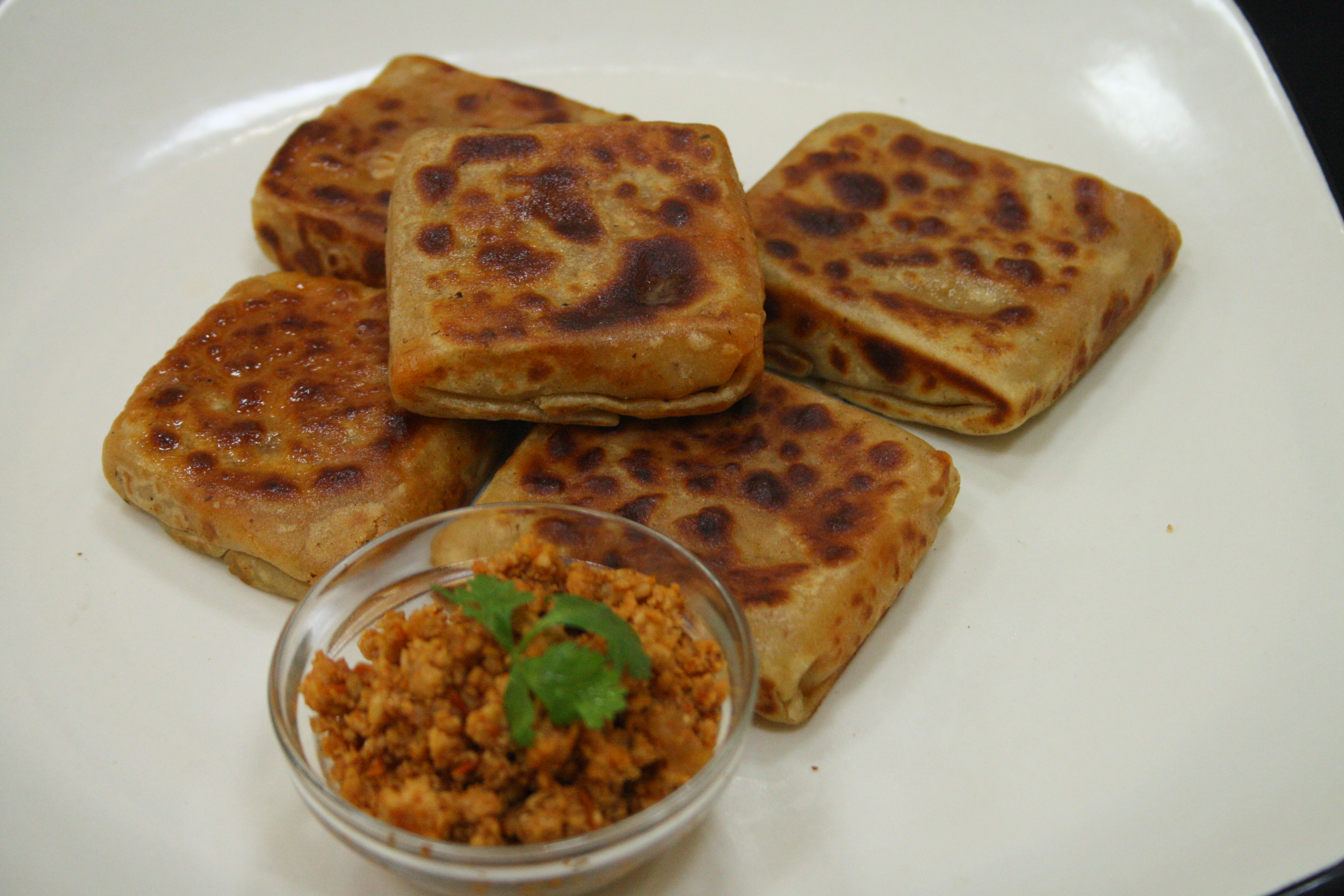
Mughlai paratha

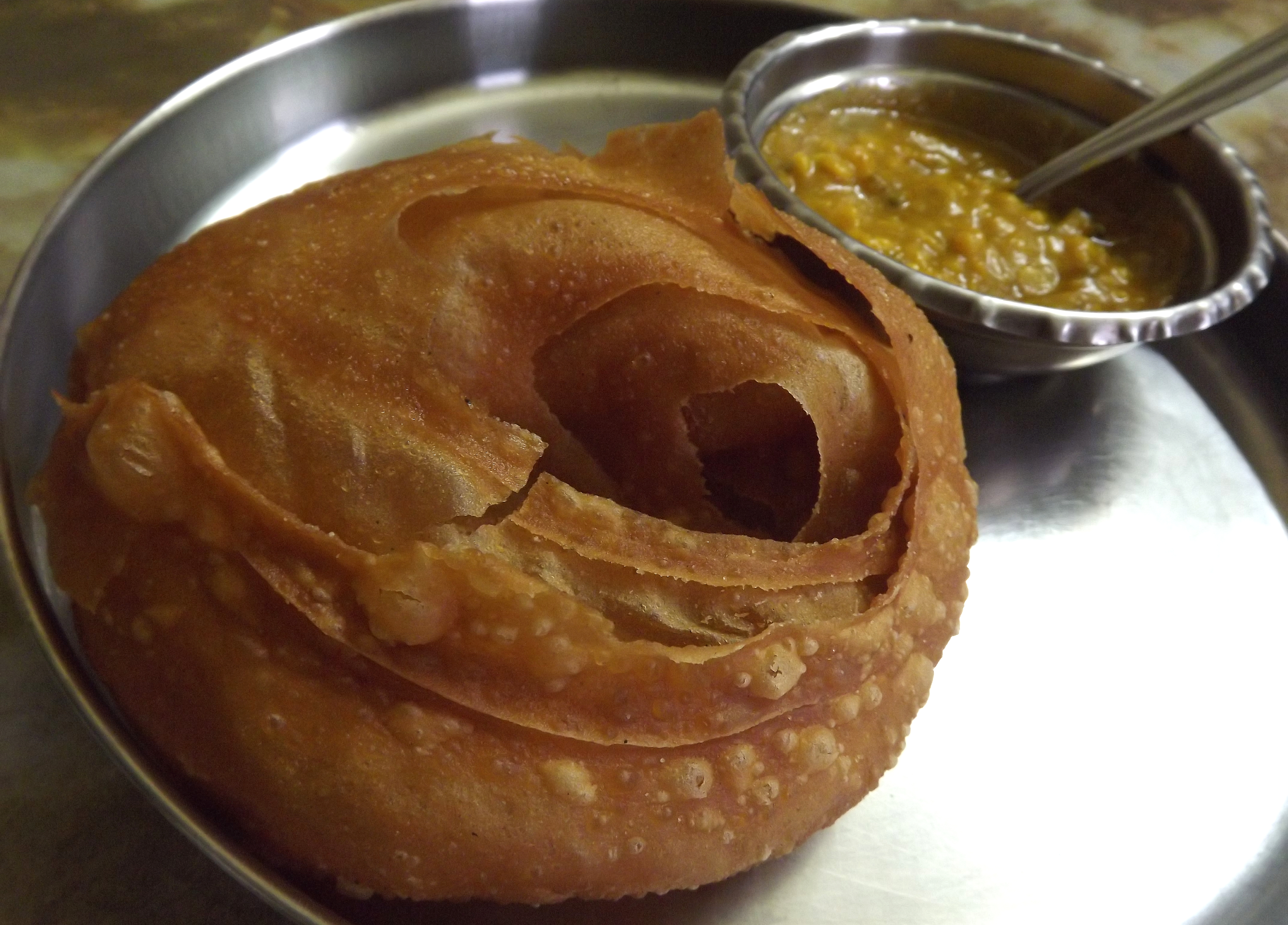
Dhakai paratha

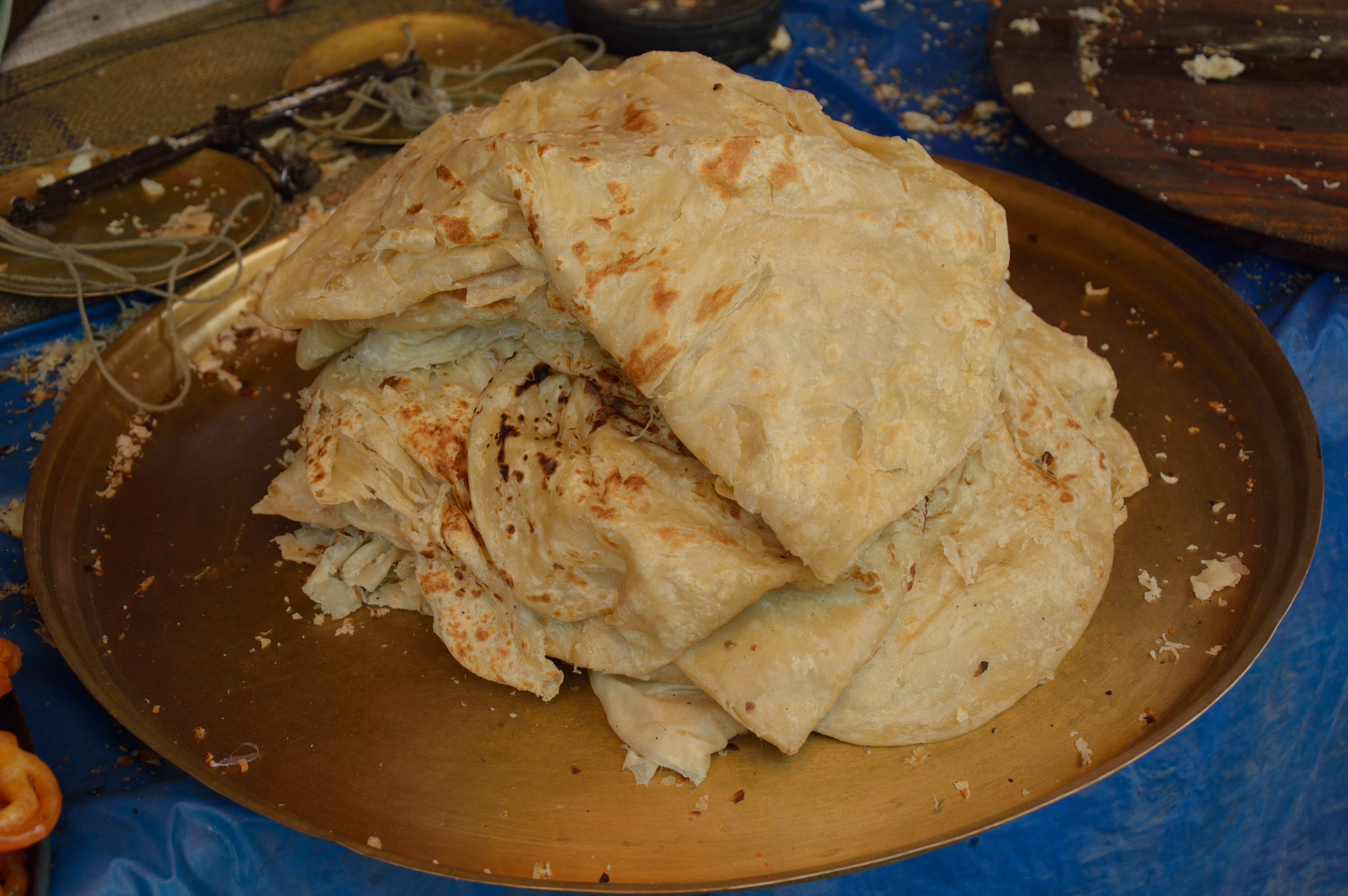
Petai porota

Some regions of India serve unique forms of paratha. Warqi paratha (lit. 'layered paratha') is a variant in Awadhi cuisine, originating in Lucknow. It is made of white flour and a large amount of ghee, sometimes with sugar and saffron, and it is folded and rolled. A type of paratha in eastern Uttar Pradesh and Bihar is called makhuni. Dulhan paratha, originating from Hyderabad, Pakistan, is named for its elaborate presentation, which is reminiscent of the ornate appearance of a bride (dulhan in Urdu); this dish is known for its combination of flavorful ingredients.

Versions of paratha exist beyond the Indian subcontinent. Caribbean cuisine features parathas that are milk-based and crispy, known as buss-up-shut. In Trinidad and Tobago, this is classified as a roti, distinguished from other rotis by using more oil. The roti served in Suriname also evolved from paratha. The Malaysian variation, roti canai, is a type of South Indian parotta. The Burmese version, palata, may use whole-wheat dough with a filling of peas, served with fried onions on top. It is eaten using chopsticks. Other Burmese versions include a banana-stuffed version and a pigeon pea-stuffed version known as bei palata. The Afghan version, known as naun-i-parauta, is leavened and cooked on a griddle. In Sri Lankan cuisine, paratha is known as godamba roti.

Versions of paratha from beyond the Indian subcontinent
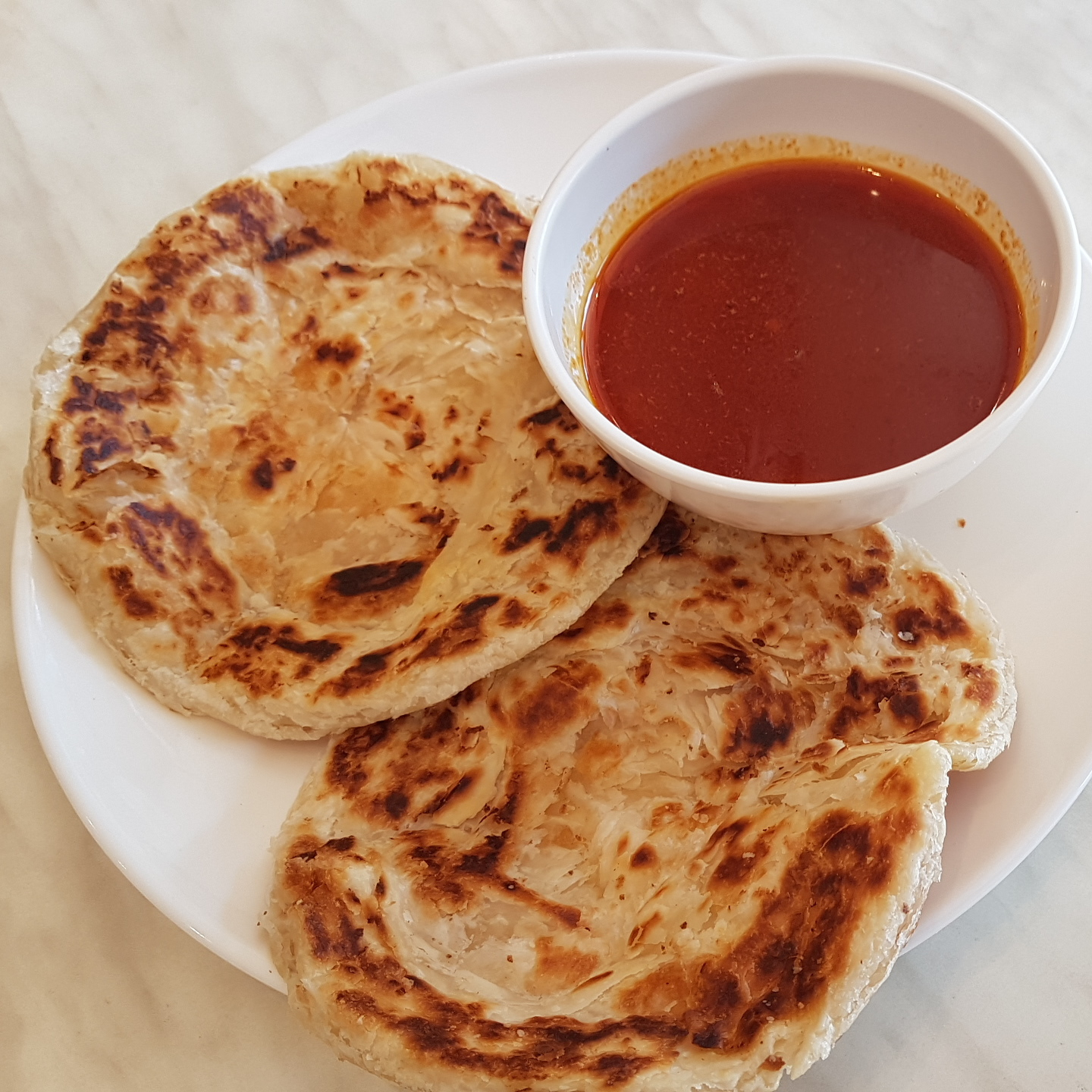
Malaysian roti canai

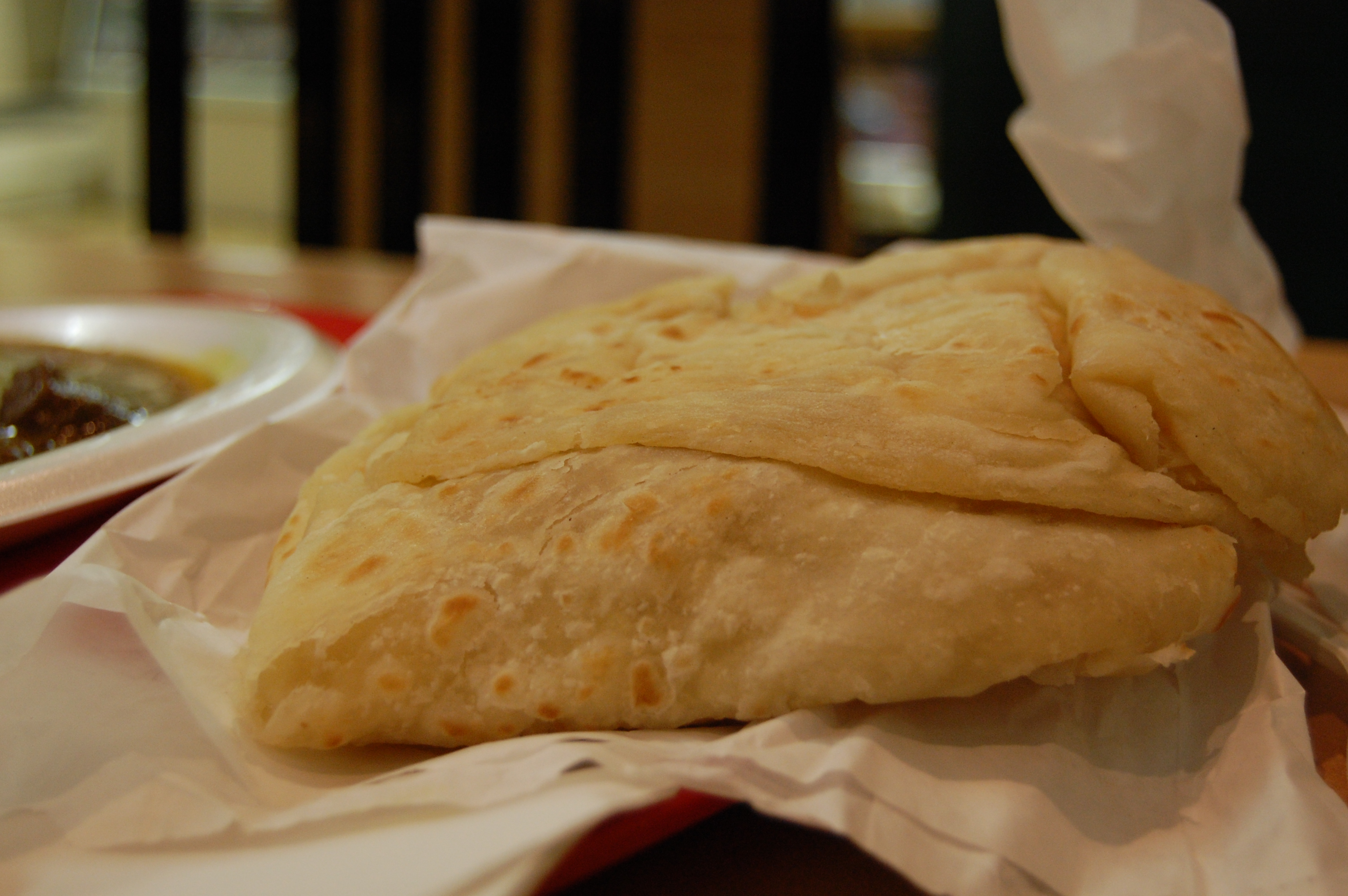
Trinidadian buss-up-shut

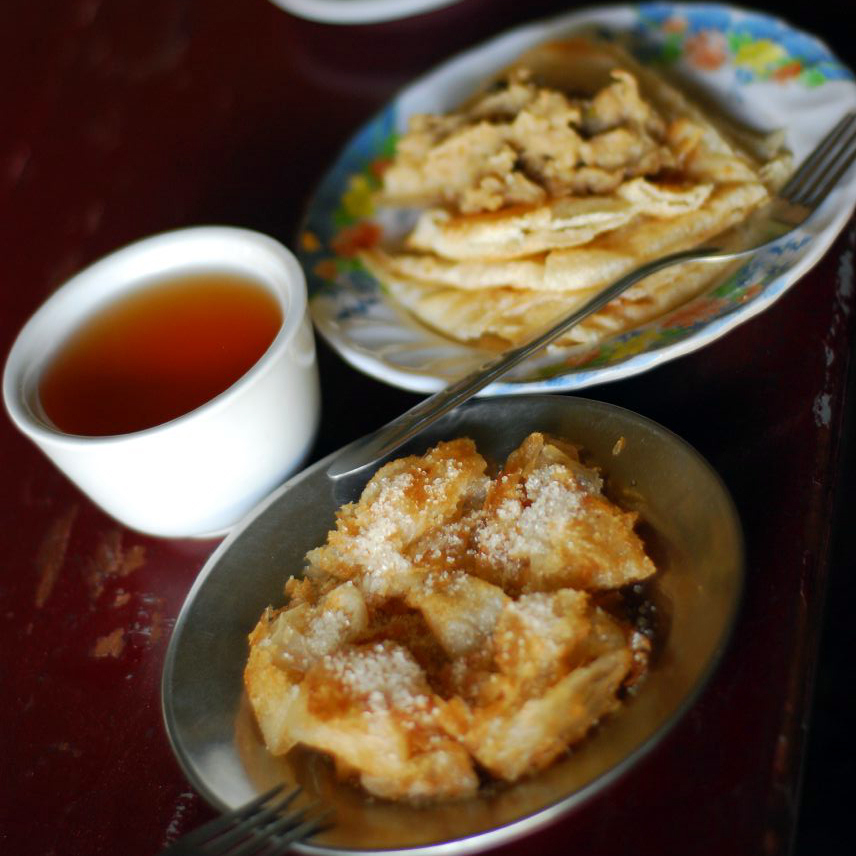
Burmese palata

== Serving ==
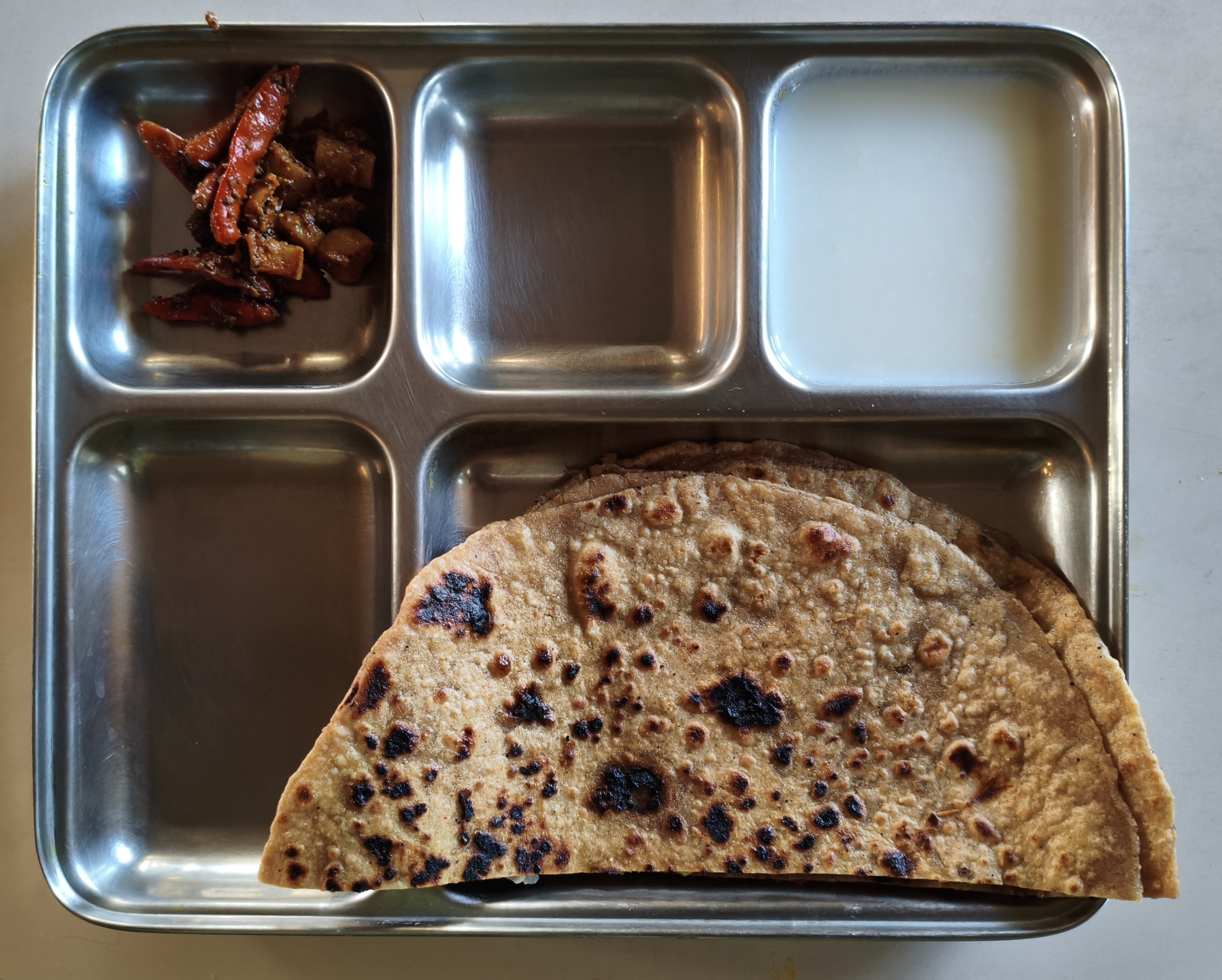
Mooli paratha with dahi and pickle, common pairings with paratha

Paratha may be served for any meal. Like other flatbreads in North Indian cuisine, it is served as the central component of a typical meal; the bread is eaten by using the hands to tear the bread and pick up the accompanying food. A stuffed paratha may be a full meal.

A wide range of foods may be served with paratha. Common accompaniments include curries, sabzi, pickle, and dahi (curd). Likewise, stuffed parathas such as aloo paratha are commonly served with curd or pickle. When served by vendors, paratha often comes with dahi or pickle included. A paratha may also be served with tea or raita, with which it can be rolled up and dipped. As a dessert, paratha may be eaten with brown sugar.

Although rice is the staple in Kashmiri cuisine, parathas paired with kofta are a common dish served to guests. In middle-class Bangladeshi cuisine, paratha is eaten for breakfast or, less commonly, for dinner, while rice is more common for lunch. In the cuisine of Odisha, it is eaten with egg curry for dinner. In the cuisine of Haryana, it may be eaten with mung beans. Parotta served with beef is a culturally significant dish in Kerala.

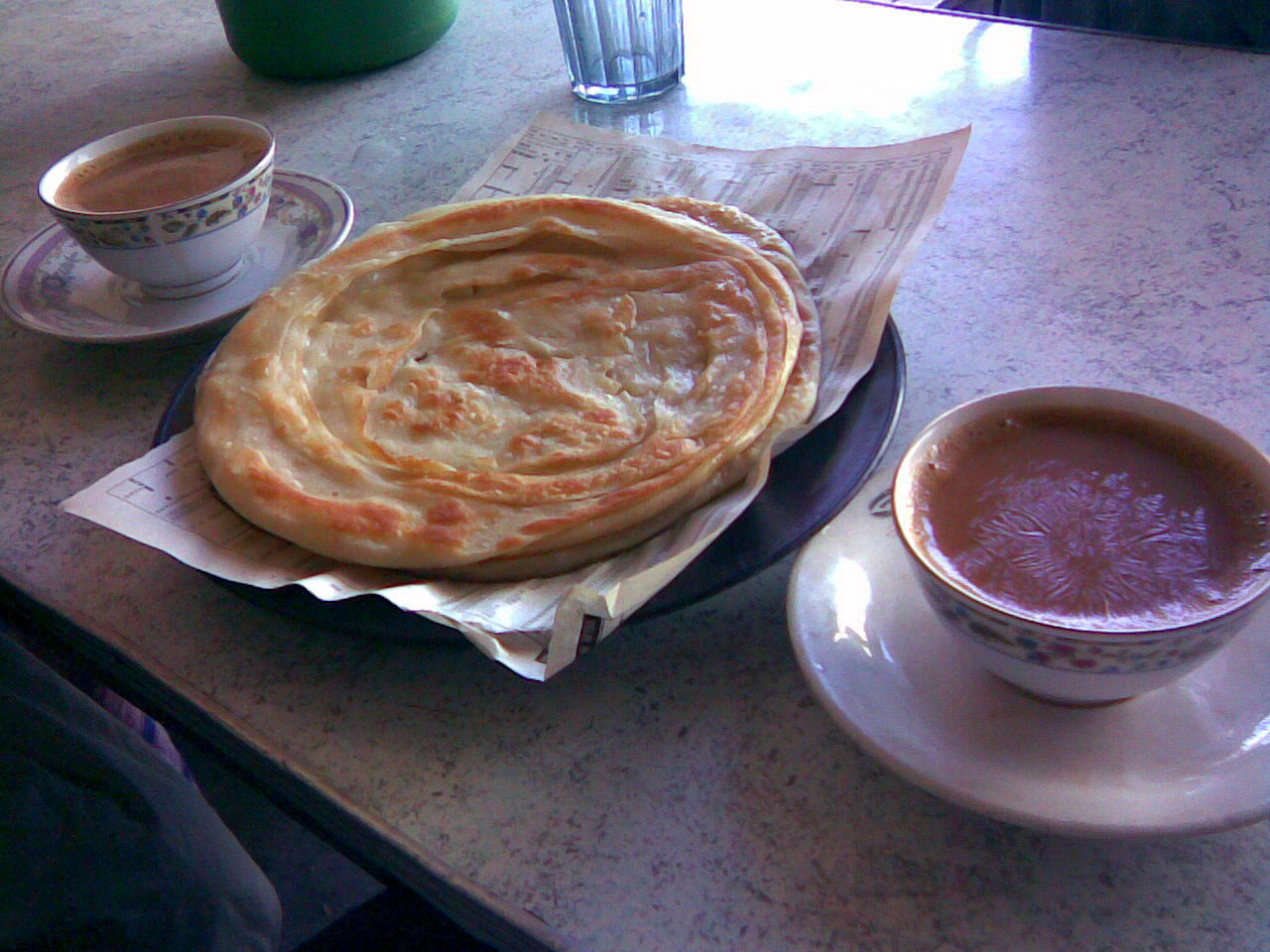
Paratha served with tea in Pakistan

Paratha is frequently part of a breakfast in North India. A common breakfast in India and Pakistan consists of paratha, butter, and tea, and it may also be eaten alongside eggs. In Karachi, the phrase "chai-paratha" is synonymous with breakfast, and a 1987 survey found that paratha is the most common breakfast food. Paratha with pickle and curd is also a common breakfast. A typical breakfast in Uttar Pradeshi Hindu cuisine may pair paratha with a vegetable dish or sweet halva. In Hyderabadi Muslim cuisine, paratha may be paired with eggs or minced meat for breakfast or with a meat dish for lunch. Stuffed parathas such as aloo paratha, as well as plain parathas, are commonly eaten for breakfast in Punjab and Haryana.

Paratha may be used for wraps, commonly with kebabs. The kathi roll, originating in Kolkata, is a wrap with a kebab or other toppings served on an egg-covered paratha; This egg-covered paratha in a kathi roll differs from anda paratha, with the egg being scrambled on top of the paratha as it cooks. In Pakistan, particularly in Karachi, a kebab wrapped in paratha is known as a paratha roll. In Lucknow, ulte tave ke paratha may be served as a crispy cone, and is the typical pairing with galouti kebab. The frankie is another wrap using paratha, with various fillings, served as street food in Indian cities. In the United Arab Emirates, paratha is used to make a wrap with potato chips of the brand Chips Oman. The paratha burger—a hamburger using paratha rather than a hamburger bun—originated in Dubai, at the restaurant Klay by Karak House.

== Nutrition and chemistry ==
Paratha, whole wheat, commercially prepared, Frozen
Nutritional value per 100 g (3.5 oz)
- Energy: 327 kcal (1,370 kJ)
- Carbohydrates: 45.36 g
- Sugars: 4.15
- Dietary fiber: 9.6 g
- Fat: 13.20 g
- Protein: 6.36 g
Vitamins and minerals
Vitamins	Quantity %DV^{†}
Thiamine (B1)	9% 0.11 mg
Riboflavin (B2)	6% 0.076 mg
Niacin (B3)	11% 1.830 mg
Pantothenic acid (B5)	0% 0 mg
Vitamin B6	5% 0.08 mg
Folate (B9)	0% 0 μg
Vitamin E	9% 1.35 mg
Vitamin K	3% 3.4 μg
Minerals	Quantity %DV^{†}
Calcium	2% 25 mg
Iron	9% 1.61 mg
Magnesium	9% 37 mg
Phosphorus	10% 120 mg
Potassium	5% 139 mg
Sodium	20% 452 mg
Zinc	7% 0.82 mg
- Other constituents: Quantity
- Water: 33.5 g
- Link to USDA Database entry
- ^{†}Percentages estimated using US recommendations for adults, except for potassium, which is estimated based on expert recommendation from the National Academies.

Aloo paratha (fresh, unfortified)
Nutritional value per 100 g (3.5 oz)
- Carbohydrates
- Sugars: 6.0 g
- Fat: 3.3 g
- Protein: 6.1 g
Vitamins and minerals
Minerals	Quantity %DV^{†}
Iron	18% 3.2 mg
Zinc	18% 2.0 mg
- Other constituents: Quantity
- Water: 58 g
- Ash: 2 g
- ^{†}Percentages estimated using US recommendations for adults.

Methi paratha (fresh)
Nutritional value per 100 g (3.5 oz)
- Carbohydrates: 42.38 g
- Starch: 0.49 g
- Dietary fiber: 10.39 g
- Fat: 7.03 g
- Protein: 10.0 g
- Other constituents: Quantity
- Water: 27.19 g
- Ash: 2.96 g

Paratha contains wheat, which provides calories, protein, and minerals and is a major source of carbohydrates. As parathas are fried in oil, they have a higher fat content than other flatbreads, The fat content of aloo paratha is about 3.3%, while that of leaf vegetable stuffed parathas has been measured at 5%. The sodium content may be high, based on the amount of salt added according to consumer preferences. A 2018 study in Malaysia found high amounts of added sugar in restaurant paratha.

The average commercially produced paratha provides 306 dietary calories per 100 grams. This portion contains 44.97 g carbohydrates (including 3.41 g sugar), 11.37 g fat (including 5.23 g saturated fat), 6.92 g protein, 3.96 g fibre, and 371.28 mg salt. A 100 g serving of a homemade paratha—using the recipe published by the Ministry of Health of Oman—has 394 calories and 13.8 g fat. Parathas have a high trans fat content of about 7.8%. The fat content of paratha may contribute to a lower glycemic index than other breads. The aforementioned homemade paratha has a glycemic index of 32, while methi paratha made with curd and oil has a glycemic index of about 60, lower than that of roti.

Paratha contains a high amount of the vitamin retinol, in part due to the use of ghee. It is also high in iron and vitamin A; the use of palm oil has been shown to increase vitamin A content. The micronutrient content, based on samples from the United Kingdom, is as follows:

Vitamins and minerals
Vitamin	Per 100 g	Mineral	Per 100 g
Retinol	153 μg	Sodium	99 mg
Beta-carotene	97 μg	Magnesium	51 mg
Thiamine	0.18 μg	Potassium	160 mg
Riboflavin	0.05 mg	Calcium	85 mg
Niacin	4.1 mg	Iron	2 mg
Vitamin B6	0.14 mg	Zinc	1.2 mg
Folate	16 μg		
Vitamin B12	Trace		
Vitamin C	Trace		
Vitamin D	0.1 μg		

Paratha with additional ingredients can be more nutritionally balanced. Methi paratha is high in fibre and carotenoids, while bathua paratha is especially high in iron and carotene.

The moisture content of paratha is over 40%. Due to its short cooking time, paratha experiences low loss of moisture and low deterioration of protein. It loses about 40% of its weight during cooking. The use of composite flours has been shown to produce acceptable parathas with increased nutrition.

Parathas, including stuffed parathas, are very perishable due to a high moisture content. Stuffed parathas experience mold growth in twelve to twenty-four hours. Thermal processing has been shown to increase the shelf life; however, this may result in hardening, discoloration, and loss of shape. Irradiation has been shown to preserve paratha for over six months. Other preservation methods include vacuum packing and additives such as sorbic acid.

== History ==
Map showing the possible historical spread of paratha, according to Sonal Ved's theory that the dish evolved from the Persian waraki and Kurush Dalal's theory that the South Indian version was introduced via maritime trade routes

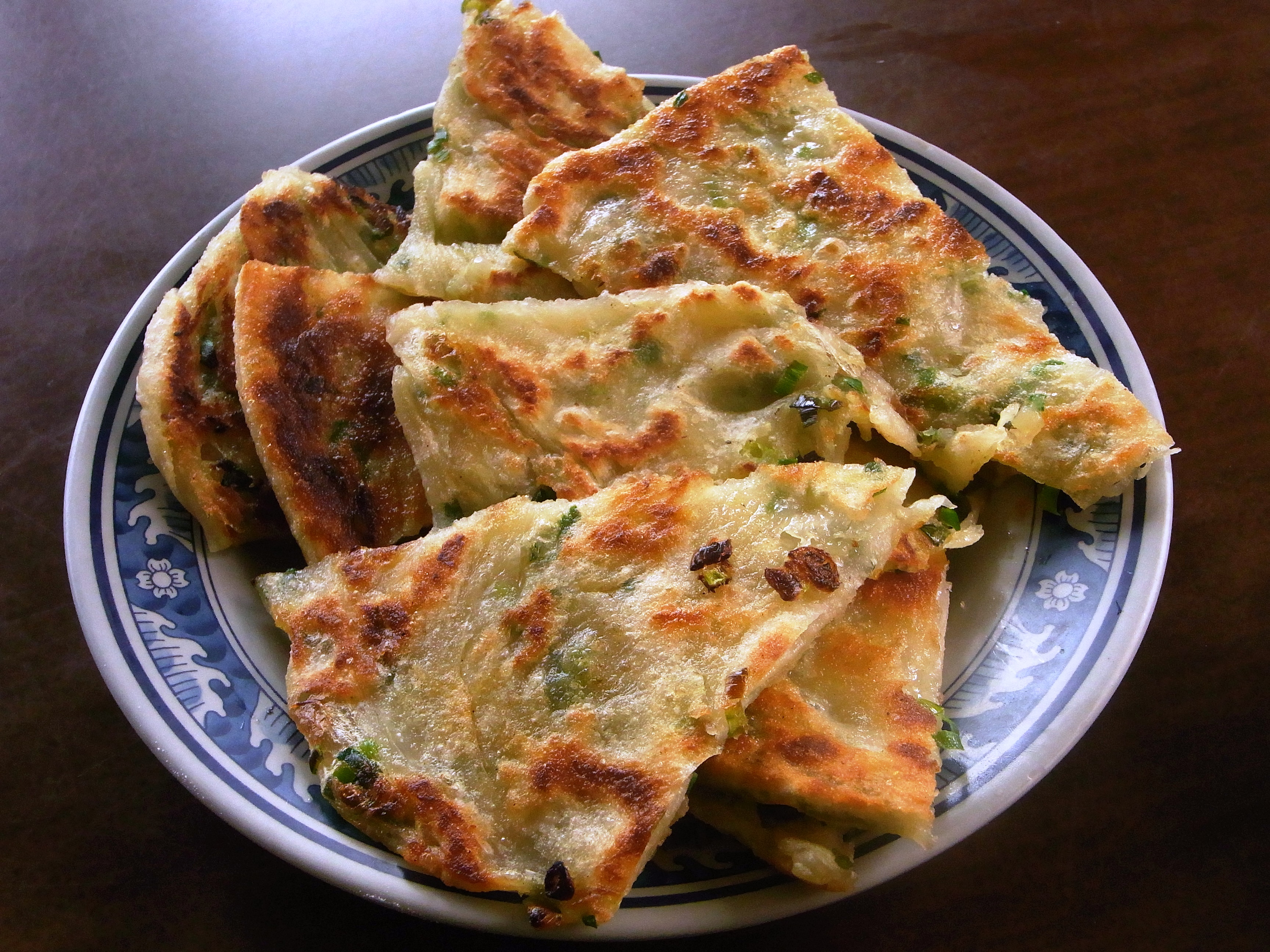
Foods similar to paratha include the Chinese scallion pancake, which may have spread to India through the Silk Road.

Historian Pushpesh Pant writes that there is no evidence of paratha in Ancient India, while historian Chitrita Banerji writes that it "has probably been around in some form or another since antiquity." A theory that paratha originated in Punjabi cuisine is commonly held among Punjabis. (Note: Food historian Charmaine O'Brien supports the statement that paratha originated in Punjab.) Banerji writes that, despite its association with Punjabi and North Indian cuisine, paratha is often said to be related to poli, a flatbread in Maharashtrian and Gujarati cuisine. According to Megha Kohli in The Bloomsbury Handbook of Indian cuisine, paratha originated in the city of Peshawar (in modern-day northern Pakistan).

Trade routes to India, such as the Silk Road, may have introduced flatbreads from Persia and Central Asia, as well as the scallion pancake of Chinese and Uyghur cuisine, which resemble paratha. The book Whose Samosa Is It Anyway? by Sonal Ved suggests that paratha was adapted from the Persian waraki, a milk-based flatbread with separating layers. A theory supported by Pant states that paratha was invented after the arrival of Arabs in India, who merged flatbreads introduced by the Arabs, like roomali and khamiri roti, with the local puri. Culinary anthropologist Kurush Dalal stated that South Asian parotta came from Central Asia—through maritime trade routes with the Malabar Coast—rather than from North India. Paratha also entered Sri Lankan cuisine from South India.

Recipes for various parathas are mentioned in Manasollasa, a 12th-century Sanskrit reference work compiled by Someshvara III, a Western Chalukya king who ruled from present-day Karnataka. According to historian K. T. Achaya, the parathas listed in this book were more similar to the modern manda roti. These included purana, which Achaya describes as the modern-day puran poli, as well as stuffed parathas called manda, vestika, and pahalika, the latter being a sweet version. In Bengal, food historian Jayanta Sengupta attributes the introduction of wheat breads like paratha to the thirteenth-century Turkic conquest. During the Islamic era, parathas were common with the Muslim nobility and Hindu aristocracy in Punjab, and paratha was also eaten in the Delhi Sultanate.

The Mughal Empire introduced more complex ingredients to the cuisine of the era, used for foods such as paratha. Mughal cookbooks included recipes for paratha. It does not appear in the Nushka-e-Shahjahani, from the reign of Mughal Emperor Shah Jahan, indicating that it was not yet present. Banerji states that the Mughals were introduced to parathas during their conquests of Punjab. The paratha was popular among Mughal leadership, and it later became popular in Islamic Indian cuisine. It and other flatbreads spread to Dhaka, in Bengal, during this time. Sweet parathas were also eaten during the Mughal era.

People from India were sent as indentured workers to Southeast Asia, Mauritius, the Maldives, and the Caribbean, where they introduced paratha. This included the British colony in Trinidad, where Indians sent as workers began using white flour for paratha and other flatbreads as a result of European imports. On migrant ships to the Caribbean, cooks began using tavas to make large parathas portioned for several people, originating the variation known as paratha roti. Paratha was introduced to Malaysia around the 1930s by people from the Indian city of Chennai; the term roti canai derives from the city's name.

In 19th-century British India, North Indian snack foods such as paratha were eaten as tiffin snacks as part of an early form of Indian fast food. A similar flatbread, sheermal, is said to have been created as a type of paratha in Lucknow in the 19th century, although it may have originated in Persia. In Bengal, wheat-based foods such as paratha and luchi were primarily for special occasions (such as Ekadashi) before wheat became a staple food, alongside rice, during the 1943 famine.

During the 1947 partition of India, Punjabi refugees propagated various stuffed parathas, including aloo, gobhi, mooli, methi, and matar, with paneer and keema stuffed versions appearing later. Pant writes that tandoor-baked paratha was introduced to India during the partition, out of a desire for roti to be less chewy and cold, and that it originated from Amritsari kulcha. Parathas became a common item at dhaba establishments; Pant writes that roadside dhabas invented lachha and pudina parathas. Some state that the paratha was popularised in Delhi after the partition. However, O'Brien suggests this item was prevalent among Punjabis in Delhi before then, and paratha vendors at the Paranthe Wali Gali claim to have been present since the 1880s. In the Caribbean, paratha was one of several dishes from Mughlai cuisine to be widely popularised in the late 20th century.

The world record for the largest paratha, as recognised by the Guinness World Records, was set in February 2024 in Amritsar, when chefs from the Taj Swarna hotel created a methi paratha weighing 35 kilograms (77 lb).

== Prevalence ==
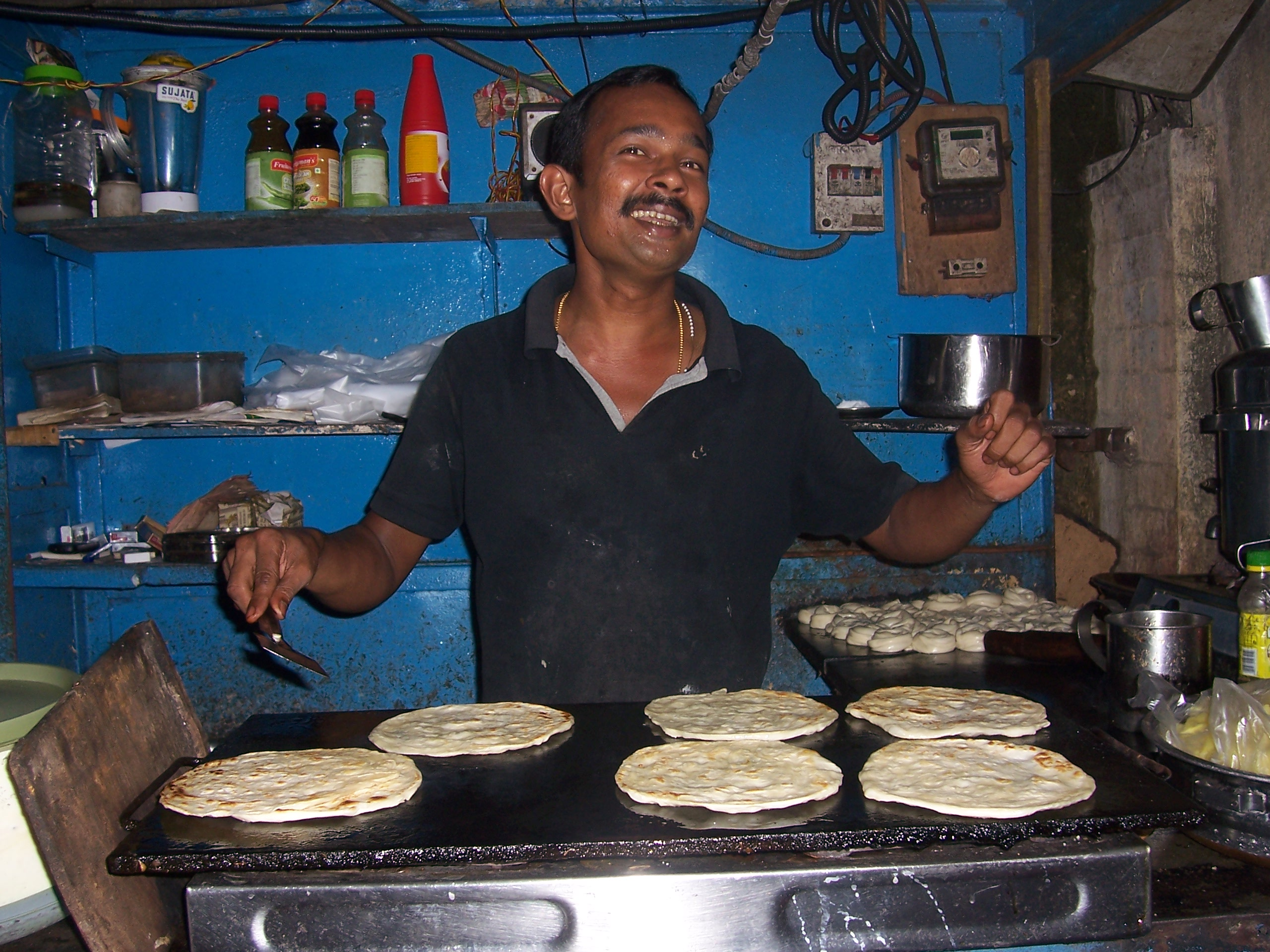
Paratha is commonly served by vendors.

Paratha is one of the most common flatbreads in India—alongside chapati and naan—and is the most common that is shallow-fried. It is associated with North Indian cuisine, in which wheat is the predominant staple and atta is particularly common. A 2022 study in the South Indian city of Hyderabad found that the average adult consumes 1 paratha, or 40 grams, per day.

Like chapati and puri, paratha is often homemade, as tavas are a common household item. Ready-to-eat parathas, sold as a convenience food, are a common product in India, as are several types of frozen stuffed paratha. Ready-to-cook parathas are sold from brands such as Fingerlix.

Paratha is frequently sold by vendors at marketplaces, roadsides, and transit stations, as a consistently affordable meal. Paratha is a typical offering at Punjabi dhabas, a type of establishment on highways. It is served also by vendors next to mosques in North India to break the fast on Eid-al-Fitr; they prepare very large parathas that are sliced and served with halwa. It is less common among chefs, except for unusual stuffed versions, according to food writer Vir Sanghvi.

In North Indian Hindu traditions, paratha is classified as pukka, a type of food that is made with ghee, which is associated with purity, and is served when hosting guests or during festivals. Historically, orthodox Hindus adhered to a pukka diet; those who wanted to limit oil (for health or financial reasons) would cook paratha like chapati, with only a very thin layer of oil applied using a cloth wrapped around a coin. In Uttarakhand, aloo paratha is seen as an energy booster and, when cooked without oil, a cure for a sore throat.

=== By region ===
Paratha is commonly included in meals in both Indian and Pakistani Punjab, but it is not as common in Gujarat or in North India east of Kanpur. Paratha, like many breads eaten in North India, is also eaten in Nepali cuisine. According to Banerji, stuffed parathas are associated with North Indian cooking but have spread to every Indian city. Aloo paratha is served across India between Punjab and Bengal. It is also common in parts of Pakistan, except in the highlands. Mooli paratha is common in North India and Kashmir.

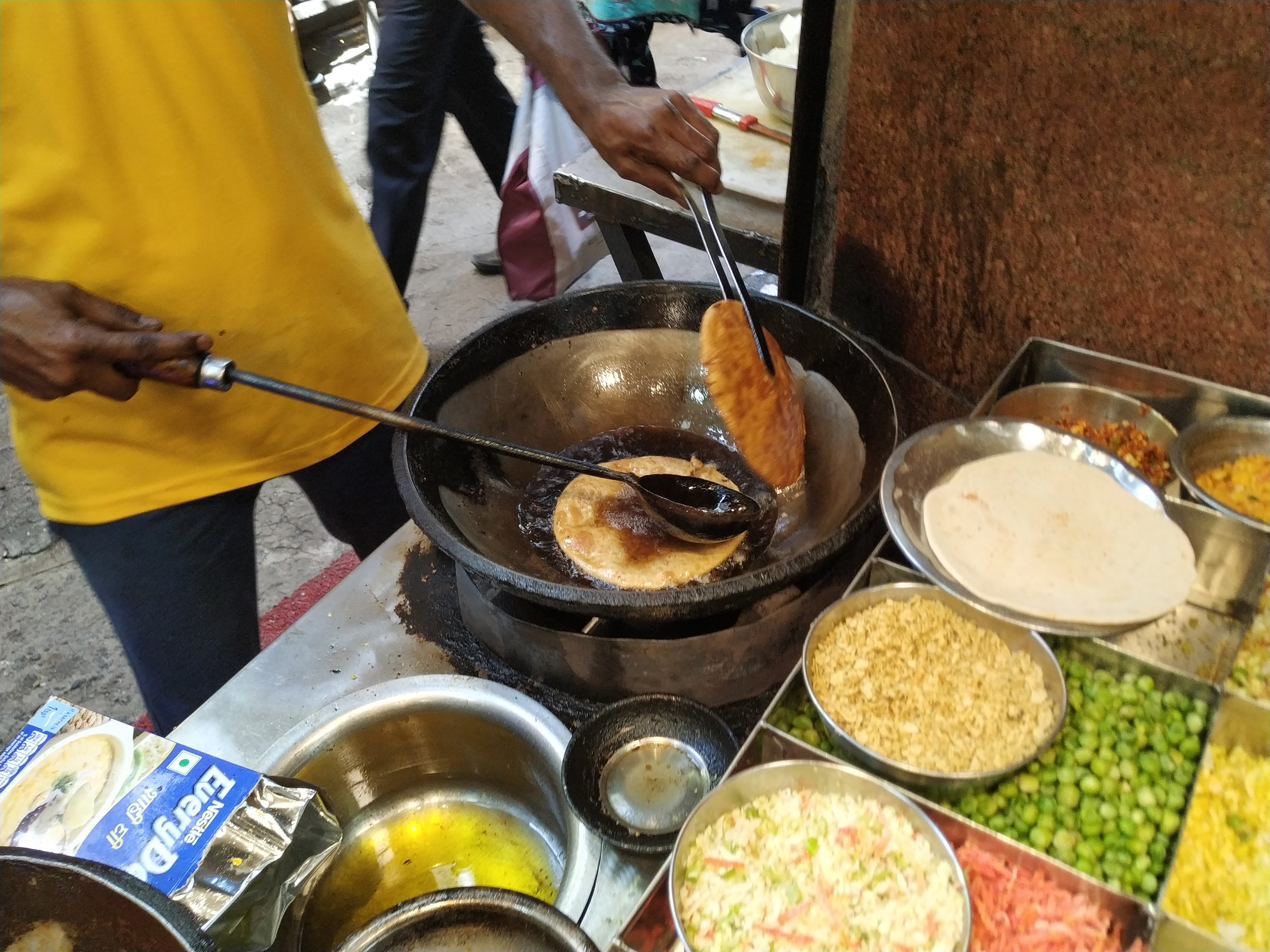
At Paranthe Wali Gali in Delhi, parathas are deep-fried and are made with many fillings.

Paratha is served by many establishments in Delhi. The city has parathas that are baked, then fried, which are large enough to serve multiple people. Old Delhi houses the Paranthe Wali Gali (lit. 'Alley of Paratha Makers'), a small lane primarily dedicated to paratha restaurants, where parathas are always stuffed, using ingredients including tomato, lemon, peppers, and papad inside the parathas. They are deep-fried in ghee, more similar to stuffed puri or bedmi than typical parathas.

Dhabas of Haryana on the Grand Trunk Road are famous for their parathas, including Sukhdev Dhaba and Gulshan Dhaba in Murthal. These dhabas serve Murthal paratha, a version that is deep-fried. In Agra, Uttar Pradesh, an establishment called Ramababu Paratha Bhandhar serves very large parathas, weighing 35 kilograms.

In Mauritius, paratha (Morisyen: farata) is eaten across all ethnic groups and is known as a homemade comfort food, particularly as a warm food during rainy weather. In Myanmar, paratha is served at Indian tea shops. People in Myanmar eat it on Martyrs' Day, as it was known to be a favorite food of Aung San, whom the holiday celebrates. In the Caribbean, paratha, particularly aloo paratha, is among several Indian fast food dishes in the region.

Paratha is widespread in Yemeni and Omani cuisine. People in Oman associate it with Omani–Indian culture rather than a specific region of India. Many Pakistanis in Norway and in Denmark limit their consumption of parathas upon immigrating, eating it as a special breakfast on weekends rather than daily, in part due to health concerns amid changing lifestyles. Pakistani migrants to the United Kingdom also eat paratha for breakfast, though some members of the community view it as a holdover from Pakistan. Among Indians in the United States, store-bought parathas are common due to busy lifestyles. Aloo paratha is commonly served at South Asian dining establishments in the United Kingdom and Pakistani restaurants in South Africa.

== See also ==
- Indian bread
- List of flatbreads
- Bolani – a similar stuffed bread from Afghanistan
