= Mughlai paratha =

Popular street food originated in Bengal

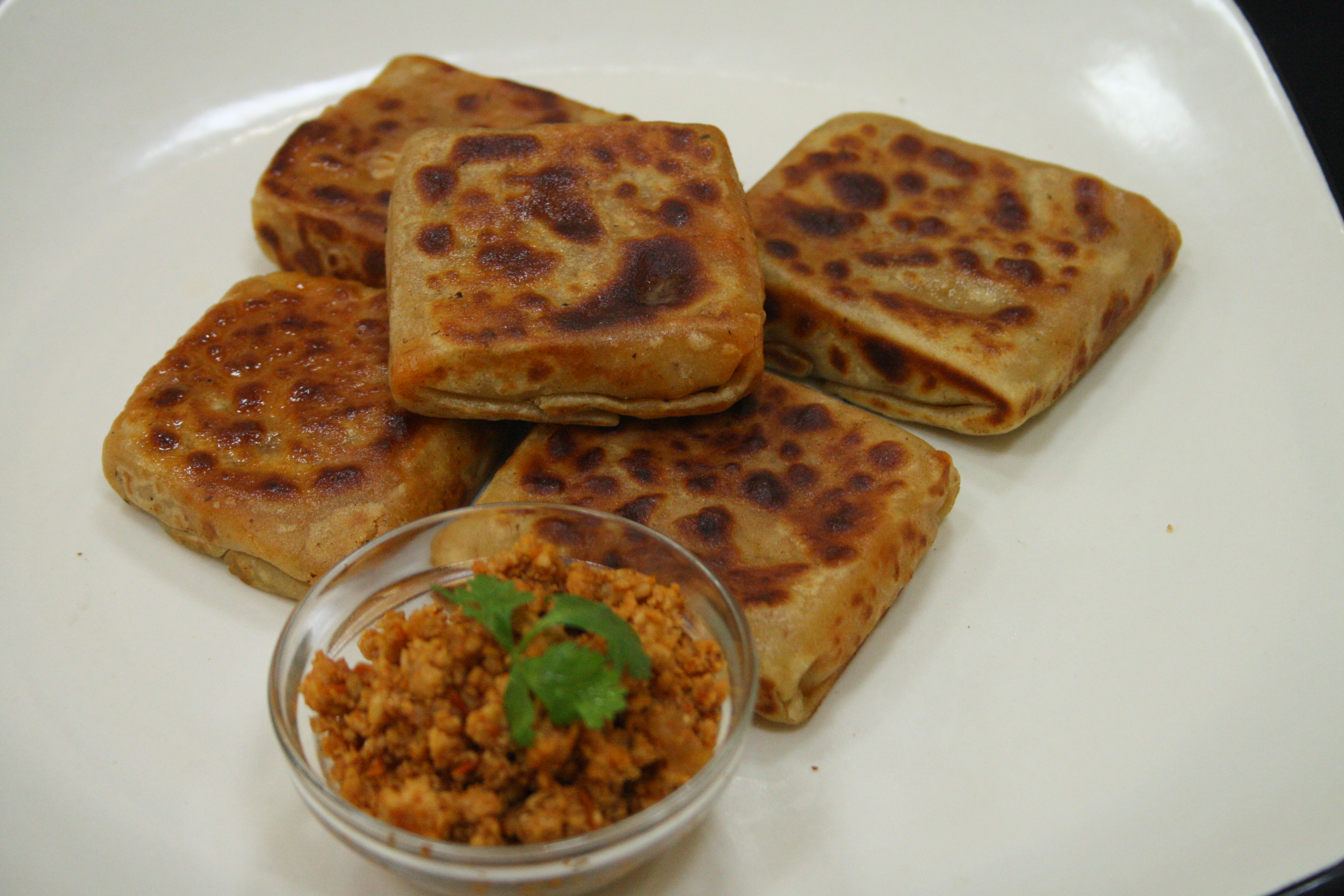
- Mughlai paratha made in Karnataka, India
- Type: Paratha
- Course: Snack
- Place of origin: Bengal Subah
- Region or state: Bengal
- Associated cuisine: Bengali
- Main ingredients: Paratha, keema (minced meat), egg, ghee, onions, spices, salt and pepper

Mughlai paratha (Bengali: মোগলাই পরোটা, romanized: Moglai pôroṭa) is a popular Bengali street food consisting of a flatbread (paratha) wrapped around or stuffed with keema (spiced minced meat) and/or egg. It is believed to have originated in the Bengal Subah during the time of the Mughal Empire as a derivative of the Turkish gözleme or the Yemeni motabbaq. The dish is believed to have been prepared for the royal court of the Mughal Emperor Jahangir.

== History ==
Mughlai paratha was one of the Mughlai recipes that entered Bengali cuisine during the Mughal Empire. It is believed that the Mughlai paratha originated during Mughal emperor Jahangir's reign and it was The Turks introduced Bengalis to Gözleme, a delicious traditional Turkish savoury. It is a flatbread recipe stuffed with spiced and minced lamb or beef filling. It is somewhat similar to Mughlai paratha and can be called the precursor of Mughlai paratha. Mughal rule mostly influenced the cuisine of the administrative capitals of the Bengal Subah, like Dhaka and Murshidabad, rather than the rural part of it. This is one of the most famous dishes in Bangladesh, particularly in Dhaka, due to the influence of the Mughal Empire on the region's culinary traditions. The dish traveled to Kolkata in West Bengal from the old capitals of the Bengal Subah, such as Dhaka and Murshidabad, after Kolkata became the capital of the newly formed Bengal presidency, under the British Raj, and the dish became a very common and popular street snack in Kolkata.

== Ingredients ==
Ingredients in the preparation of Mughlai paratha may include whole-wheat flour, ghee, eggs, finely chopped onions, chopped green chili pepper and chopped coriander leaves.

Sometimes chicken, beef or mutton keema is also used in some variants. It can also be served without a meat filling.

== See also ==
- Bangladeshi cuisine
- List of Bangladeshi dishes
- Indian cuisine
- List of Indian dishes
- List of street foods
- Murtabak
- Mahdjouba
