= Paratha roll =

Street food of Pakistan

- Alternative names: Roll paratha; Urdu: رول پراٹھا
- Type: Roll
- Place of origin: Pakistan
- Region or state: Karachi, Sindh
- Associated cuisine: Karachi, Pakistani
- Main ingredients: Mutton (lamb) pieces, paratha, egg (omlette)
- Variations: Many, depending on ingredients

Roll paratha or paratha roll (Urdu: رول پراٹھا) is a popular Pakistani street food that is similar to shawarma. Roll paratha is a paratha, a crispy oily flatbread, rolled around meat pieces or kebab, vegetables, and sauces. While any choice of meat may be used, the most popular is chicken.

The dish originated in and is a specialty of Karachi.

== Origins ==
The dish can be traced back to the 1970s in the city of Karachi, Pakistan when Hafiz Habib ur Rehman first created it out of necessity while serving a customer at Silver Spoon Snack, his Karachi restaurant. Normally he would serve a paratha and a kebab together on a plate with traditional sauce. However, one day a customer in a hurry asked him to pack the paratha and kebab. Rehman rolled the kebab inside the paratha, wrapped it in wax paper, and handed it over to the customer. Another customer witnessing it asked for the same parcel, and Rehman made it a regular offering. He developed a following for the dish by handing them out free with other orders and to passersby.

== Cultural importance ==
For many Pakistanis a paratha roll has emotional connotations. In the Pakistani tradition parathas have been a staple item for breakfast. Pakistan is a predominantly traditional family system where women cook for the family, and paratha roll is an easy dish both to make and to serve and is commonly served in homes. Many fans of paratha roll connect the experience with the memory of their mothers' cooking at home.

According to the Institute of Business Administration's Sahar Nadeem Hamid, paratha rolls are a type of fusion food.

== Availability ==
The dish is available across Pakistan from restaurants and street vendors. It is a common street food in Karachi. The dish is also available in India, Bangladesh and parts of the USA.

== Commercial version ==
In 2019, Kentucky Fried Chicken introduced Zingeratha, their version of the original dish. Eventually, KFC removed Zingeratha from their menu after it failed to gain a following.

== Variations ==
While beef, mutton, and lamb meat can be used, chicken is the most popular. The dish usually contains salad vegetables and a sauce such as chutney.

== Similar dishes ==
- Kati roll, a similar dish from Kolkata
- Shawarma, a similar dish from the Levant
- Dürüm
