= Kathi roll =

Street-food dish originating from muthi, India

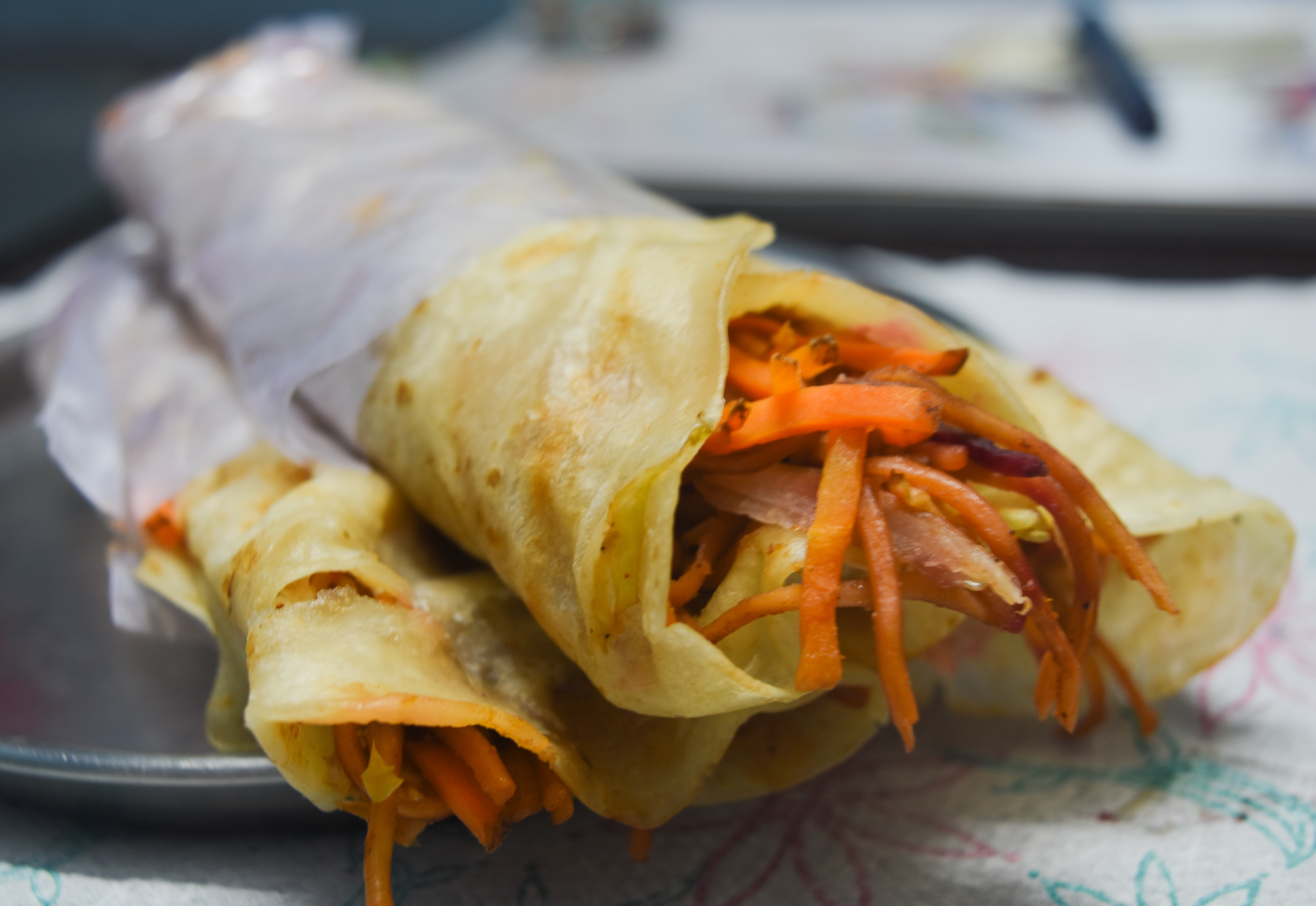
- Kathi roll served in Kolkata, India
- Alternative names: Kati roll
- Type: Roll
- Place of origin: India
- Region or state: Kolkata, West Bengal
- Associated cuisine: Bengali
- Main ingredients: Mutton (lamb) pieces, bread, egg (omlette)
- Variations: Many, depending on ingredients

A kathi roll (sometimes spelt kati roll; Bengali: কাঠি রোল) is a street-food dish originating from Kolkata, West Bengal, India. In its original form, it is a skewer-roasted kebab wrapped in a paratha bread, although over the years many variants have evolved all of which now go under the generic name of kathi roll. Today, mostly any wrap containing a filling enfolded in an Indian flatbread (roti) is called a kathi roll. In native Bengali, the word kathi roughly translates to 'stick', referring to how they were originally made. In Bengal, the delicacy is simply known as roll. Kathi rolls normally contain coriander chutney, egg, and chicken but the types may vary.

== History ==
The kathi roll is said to have started its life in the Nizam Restaurant in Kolkata, a popular Mughlai eatery founded in 1932 by one Raza Hassan Saheb. There are many stories about how exactly the roll got started. Some suggest that hurried office commuters wanted something quick and portable to eat; some mention British babus who were too fastidious to make kabab. The most likely origin is probably more mundane, but in any case someone decided to roll things up at some point. Nizam enjoyed a virtual monopoly over this method of serving kababs for decades, but it eventually became commonplace in Kolkata and later spread elsewhere.

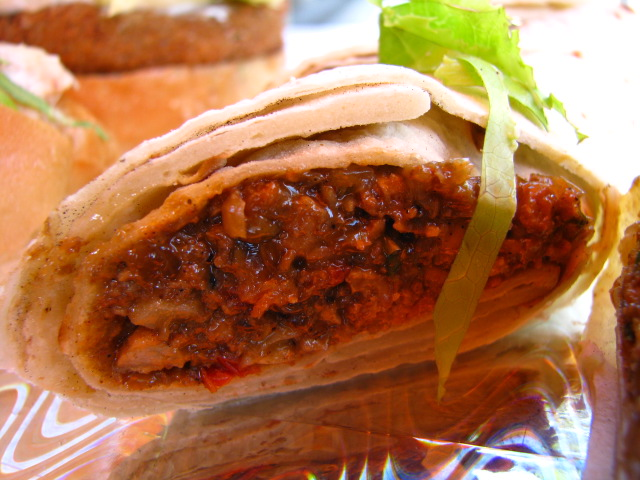
Kathi roll served in Mumbai, India

The kathi part of the name came later. Like everyone else in India, Nizam used iron skewers to make their kababs; they were easy to maintain and lasted a lifetime. However, as Nizam's popularity grew, these long heavy iron skewers became problematic, as far many more were required than could be handled. In 1964, Nizam moved to bamboo skewers that were lightweight and available in large numbers. These skewers are referred to in Bengali as kathi or 'stick', and the names kathi kabab and kathi roll soon stuck. The name eventually became synonymous with any kind of paratha rolled with stuffing (even when neither kathi nor kabab was involved) such as the egg roll or the potato roll, and later even for other breads such as naan or rumali.

In West Bengal, shops serving rolls are mostly known as Roll-er-dokaan and people use roll to refer to a kathi roll. Chicken roll and egg roll are two of the most common variants of kathi roll.

== Description ==
Traditionally, a kathi roll is a kathi kebab wrapped in a layered paratha bread. Paratha is dough that is kneaded into a rope, then coiled into a round patty. It is then flattened with a rolling pin and partially fried in oil on a tawa (griddle). These semi-cooked parathas are then kept aside until needed, at which time they're put back on the tawa and cooked through. If an egg is to be added, it is usually cracked into the tawa and the paratha put on top of the egg; they both cook together and the paratha gets coated on one side with the egg.

Kathi kababs were originally beef, and now have variations with chicken or mutton (lamb) chunks, marinated in spices and cooked on skewers (the kathi) over coals in a sigri. When the roll is being prepared, these are taken off the skewers and tossed with onions, chillies and sauces on the tawa, before being laid in a thin strip on the centre of the paratha (egg side up, when applicable). At this stage, most roll vendors will add various kinds of sauces, a dash of vinegar, a squeeze of lime, sometimes a shake of chaat masala and maybe some julienned carrots. The whole thing is then rolled up (originally in old newspaper, but now clean paper is generally used). In Kolkata, the paper usually covers only half the roll; elsewhere the paper will cover more or even all of the roll.

== Variants ==
Variants on the filling include egg, potato, paneer, mixed vegetables, and curried chicken or mutton. Other variants may have different ingredient combinations, or curries such as Thai or Sichuan. In August 2012, U.S.-based fast food chain Taco Bell released a version of the kathi roll in India. The "Mexican-inspired burrito" is a combination of a kathi roll and a Kathitto.

== Similar dishes ==
- Paratha roll, a similar dish from Karachi

== See also ==
- List of stuffed dishes
