= Chitrita Banerji =

British writer

Chitrita Banerji is a historian of Indian cuisine. She specialises in Bengali cuisine, and is also an author, novelist and translator. Her work explores the relationship between memory, history, culture, religion and food.

== Biography ==
Banerji was born in 1947, and grew up in Calcutta (now Kolkata). She originates from West Bengal, but spent seven years living in Bangladesh (formerly East Bengal). At the age of 20 she went to Harvard University where she did her master's degree in English. She has lived in the USA since 1990. She currently lives in Cambridge, Massachusetts, traveling back to India regularly.

Banerji has written for a number of publications, including The New York Times, Gastronomica, Gourmet and Granta.

== Works ==
Banerji is the author of several books:

- Life and Food in Bengal, Weidenfeld & Nicolson, 1991 (later abridged as Bengali Cooking: Seasons & Festivals, Serif, 1997)
- The Hour of the Goddess: Memories of Women, Food, and Ritual in Bengal, Seagull Books, 2001. Paperback edition by Penguin Books, 2006. New edition titled Feeding the Gods, published by Seagull Books, 2006
- Land of Milk and Honey: Travels in the History of Indian Food, Seagull Books, 2007
- Eating India: An Odyssey into the Food and Culture of the Land of Spices, Bloomsbury, 2007

== Awards and honours ==
In 1998 and 1999 she received an "additional award" in the Sophie Coe awards for writings on food history.
