= Whose Samosa Is It Anyway? =

2021 book written by Sonal Ved

- Author: Sonal Ved
- Language: Indian English
- Genre: Culinary history
- Published: 2021
- Publisher: Penguin Random House
- Publication place: India

Whose Samosa Is It Anyway? is a 2021 book written by Sonal Ved and published by Penguin Random House. The book is based on the history of Indian cuisine.

== Reception ==
Shreemayee Das, in her review for The Free Press Journal, appreciated the work and wrote that ‘the task before Ved was momentous, yet her research is detailed and elaborate, spanning centuries.’ Though Das commented that she loved the introduction part of the book, she felt that the book was over ‘without exploring in a detail’.

For LiveMint, Avantika Bhuyan wrote that ‘covering an expanse of history, from the Indus Valley Civilisation to present-day India, a new book looks at global influences on our food.’
