= Roasted egg =

Roasted egg may refer to:

- Egg roast in Kerala cuisine
- Dizef roti in Mauritian cuisine, see Soy egg#Mauritian cuisine
- Beitza during Jewish Passover Seder, see Passover Seder plate#Beitza
