= Kerala beef fry =

Dish made of beef in Kerala

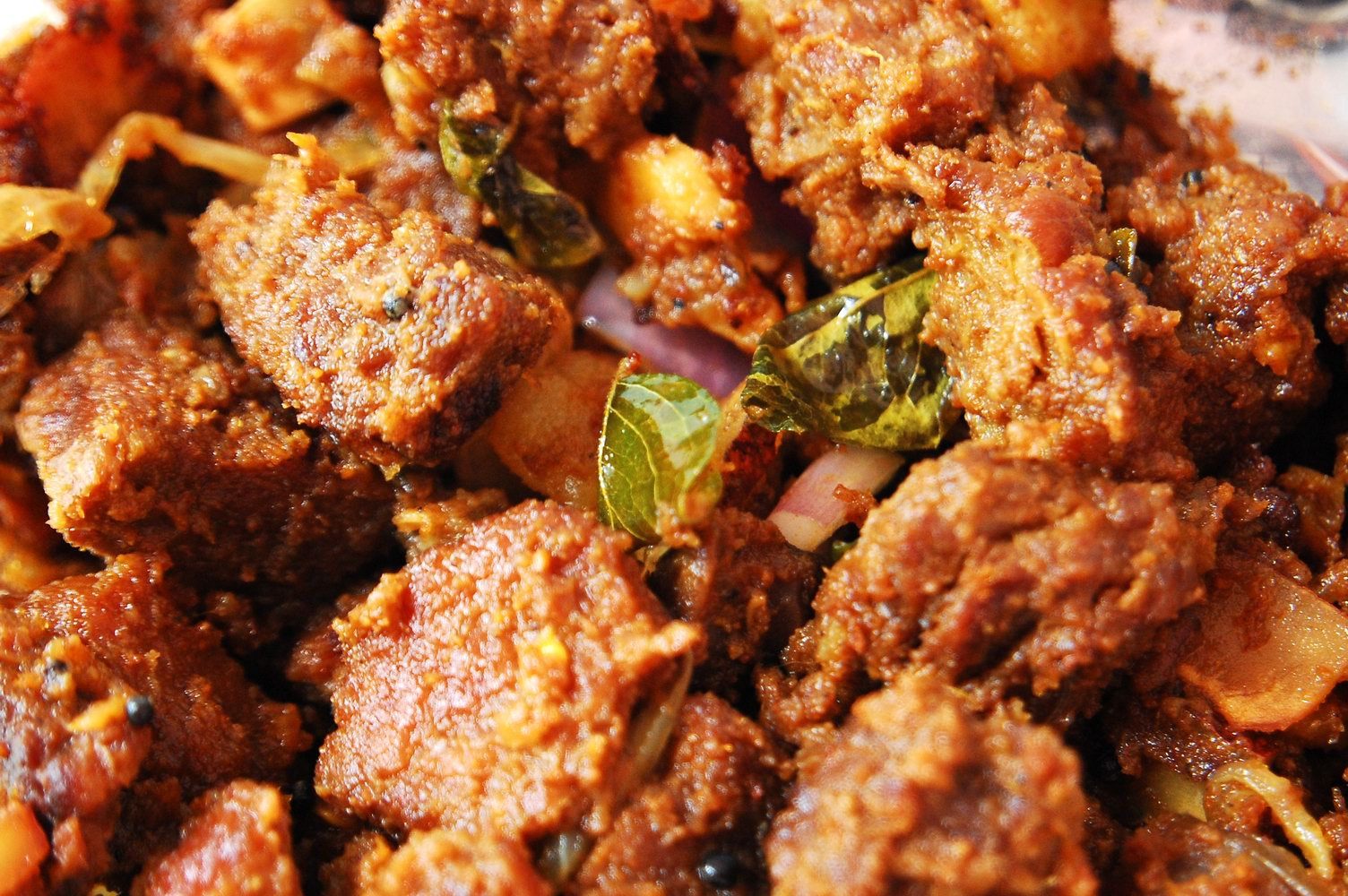
- Beef fry
- Alternative names: Beef Ularthiyathu
- Type: Slow roasted beef
- Place of origin: Kerala, India
- Serving temperature: Hot
- Main ingredients: Meat, spices, onion, coconut
- Variations: Beef Ularthiyathu

Kerala beef fry is a dish made of beef, slow-roasted in a mixture of spices, onions, curry leaves, and coconut slivers, fried in coconut oil. The dish is also popularly known in Kerala as Beef Ularthiyathu.

== Origin ==
The dish's earliest reference can be traced back to the early first millennium Sangam Literature from Kerala and Tamil Nadu states of India.

== Preparation ==
The dish is prepared by cooking chunks of meat in a mixture of spices which include turmeric, coriander, garam masala, black pepper, red chilli, cooked along with onions, shallots, ginger and garlic. Slivers of coconut, fried in coconut oil and curry leaves are also used for garnish. The meat is usually cooked in a pressure cooker to soften it before it is slow roasted in the mixture of spices, till it reaches a dry consistency.

== Combinations ==
Kerala beef fry is most commonly eaten with kerala porotta, whereas in some parts such as Thrippunithura, the dish has been combined with pazham pori and has become a very popular combo in the region.

== Controversy ==
Kerala beef fry, has found itself in the middle of many a controversy in India, with the Central Government banning the slaughter of cattle. The government of Kerala, alongside that of West Bengal, both ruled by Communists, refused to implement the ban in their states. However, electoral candidates from all parties go to great lengths to assure their voters that beef would be supplied in the most hygienic conditions in Kerala.

In Kerala, where the dish is most popular lawmakers attended a special breakfast where Kerala beef fry was served, before discussing the ban at a special session called for the purpose National award-winning actress Surabhi Lakshmi was also in the center of a controversy, where news was published that she ate beef fry during the Onam festival.

A photograph of K. Surendran of the Bharatiya Janata Party which supports a ban on beef consumption and cow slaughter, eating beef during an election campaign went viral, however he denied the same stating that it was onion curry. However, Sobha Surendran, another politician from the same party clarified that eating beef is okay.

== See also ==
- Rendang
