= Egg roast =

Cuisine of Kerala, India

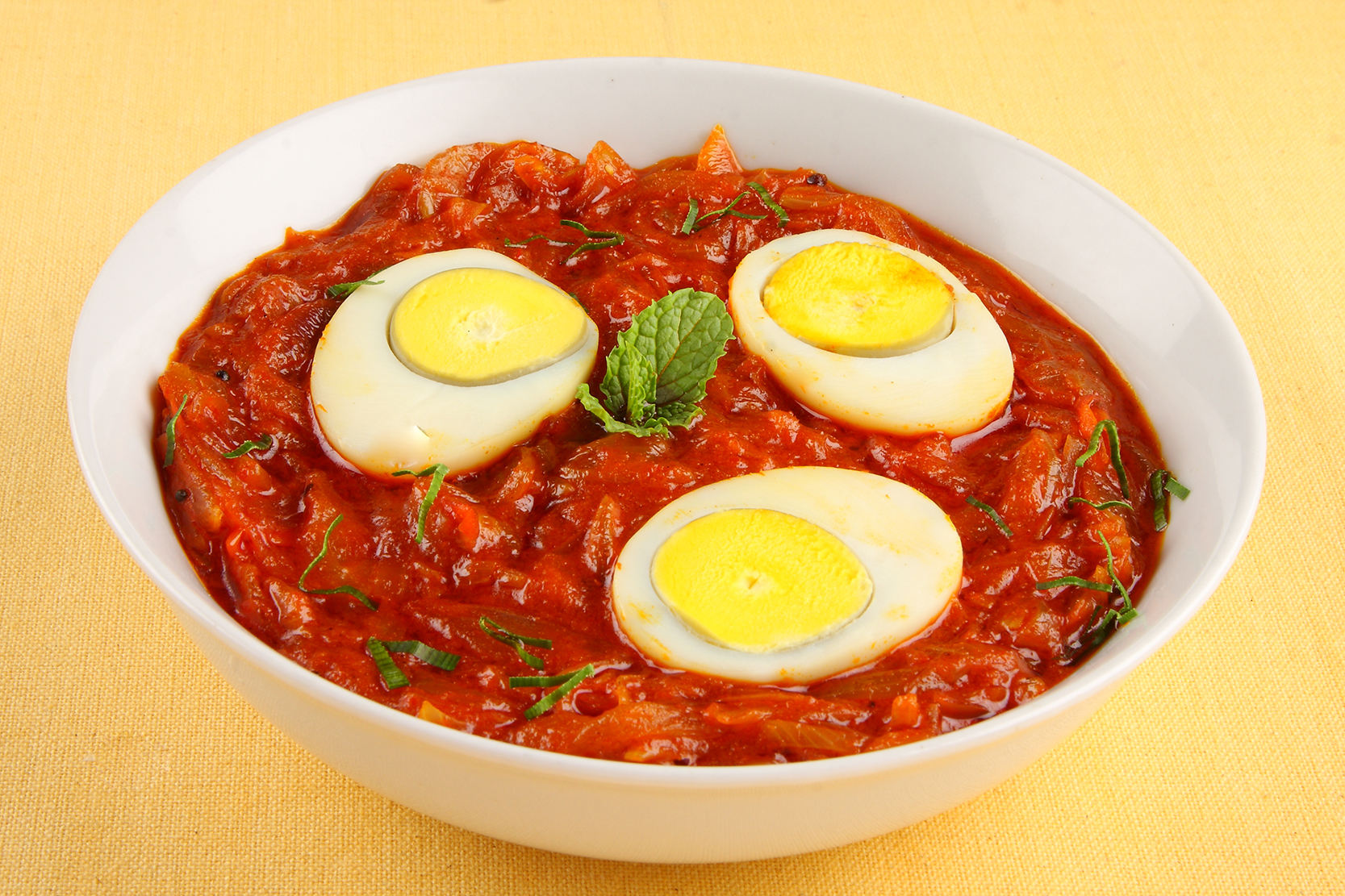
- Egg roast
- Alternative names: Mutta roast, Nadan mutta roast
- Course: Breakfast; side dish
- Place of origin: India
- Region or state: Kerala
- Associated cuisine: Keralite
- Main ingredients: Eggs, onions, coconut oil, tomatoes, spices

Egg roast is a dish native to Kerala, India, consisting of eggs roasted in a masala gravy. It is commonly consumed as an accompaniment mainly with appam and puttu or less often with chapattis (Indian flat bread) or porotas (typical all flour flat bread which is popular in Kerala, Tamil Nadu and Sri Lanka) or it is also used (least often) with steamed rice.

== Preparation ==
Egg roast is made on a base of sliced onions cooked slowly in coconut oil until they turn brown, seasoned with chilli, coriander, and turmeric powders along with curry leaves, ginger, and garlic, with chopped tomatoes worked in to make a thick masala. Hard-boiled eggs are added whole and are often slit so that the gravy soaks into them, then simmered in the masala for a few minutes. In Malayalam-speaking households it is known as mutta roast, mutta meaning egg.

== Serving and accompaniments ==
Egg roast is eaten mainly at breakfast, most often with appam, idiyappam, or puttu, and sometimes with Malabar porotta or chapati. A roadside version is sold at thattukadas, the streetside food stalls found across Kerala.
