= Kottu =

Street food dish in Sri Lanka

Kottu roti
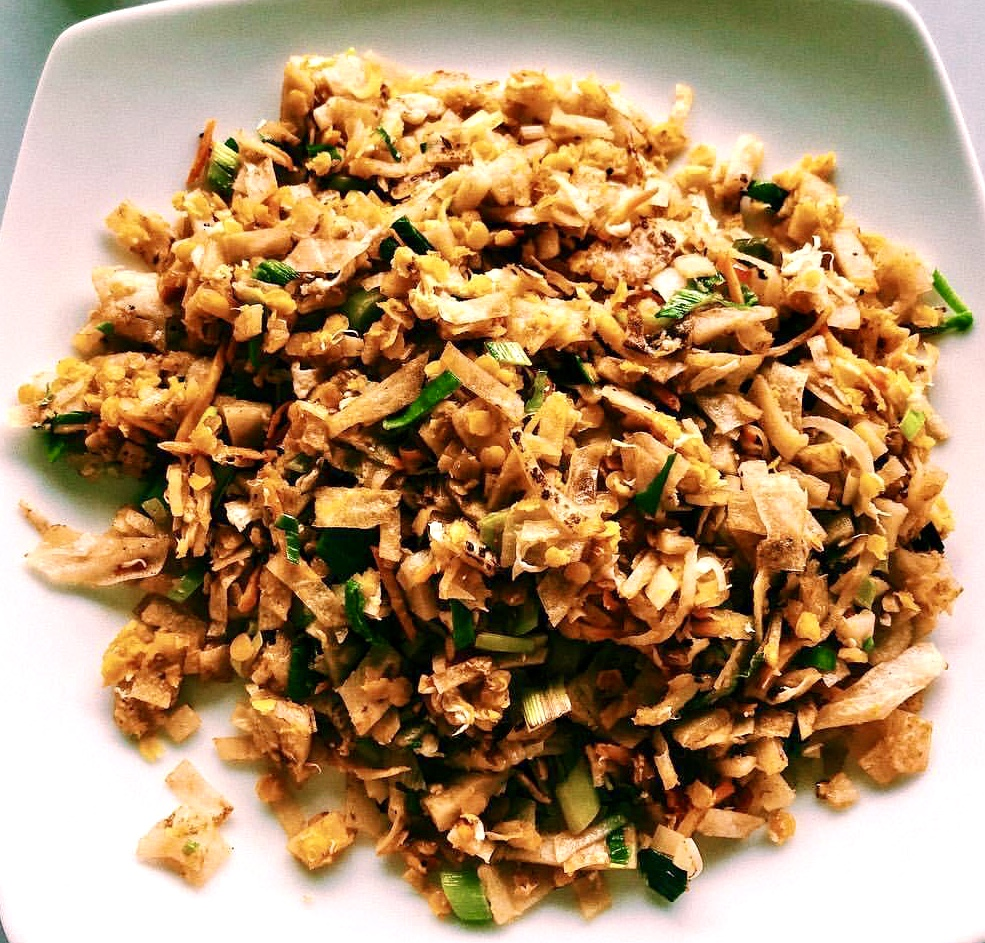
- Chicken kottu roti
- Alternative names: Kothu roti, kothu parotta, kottu
- Course: Main course
- Place of origin: Sri Lanka
- Region or state: Batticaloa, Sri Lanka
- Serving temperature: Hot
- Main ingredients: Roti, Egg, Beef, Chicken, Onion, Chilli pepper

Kottu roti (Tamil: கொத்து ரொட்டி; Sinhala: කොත්තු රොටි), alternatively spelled kothu roti, is a Sri Lankan dish consisting of chopped roti, a meat curry dish of choice (such as beef, mutton, seafood, chicken) along with scrambled egg, onions, and chillies. It originated in the Eastern regions of Sri Lanka, particularly the towns of Batticaloa and Trincomalee, from the Sri Lankan Moor community. The word Kottu is simplification of the Tamil word koththu, meaning chopped. A variation of the dish is found in the south Indian states of Tamil Nadu and Kerala, known as kothu parotta (Tamil: கொத்து பரோட்டா; Malayalam: കൊത്തു പൊറോട്ട), which is made using parotta instead of roti. Kottu roti can also be found internationally in restaurants in regions containing Sri Lankan diaspora populations.

== History ==
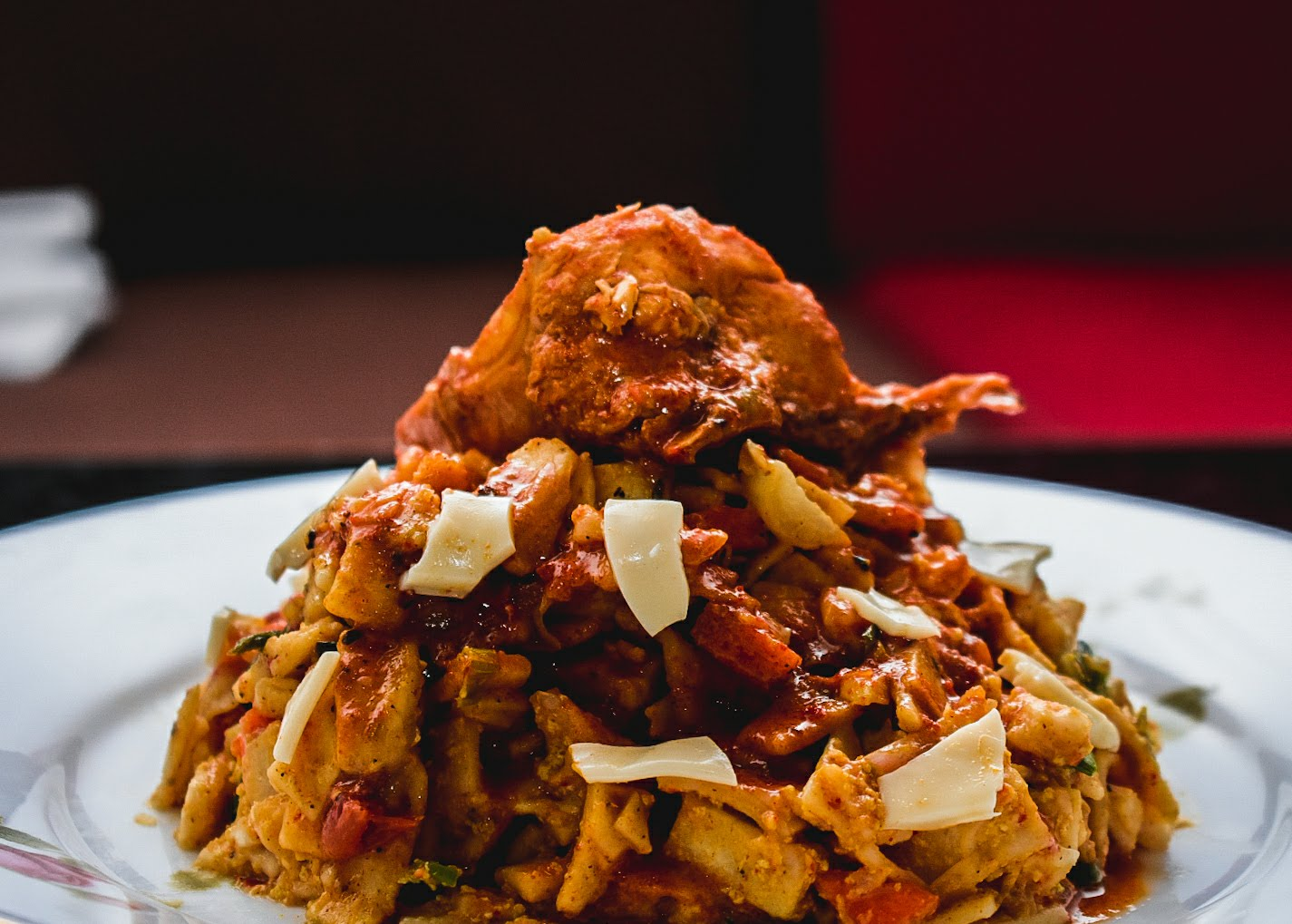
A dish of Kottu roti

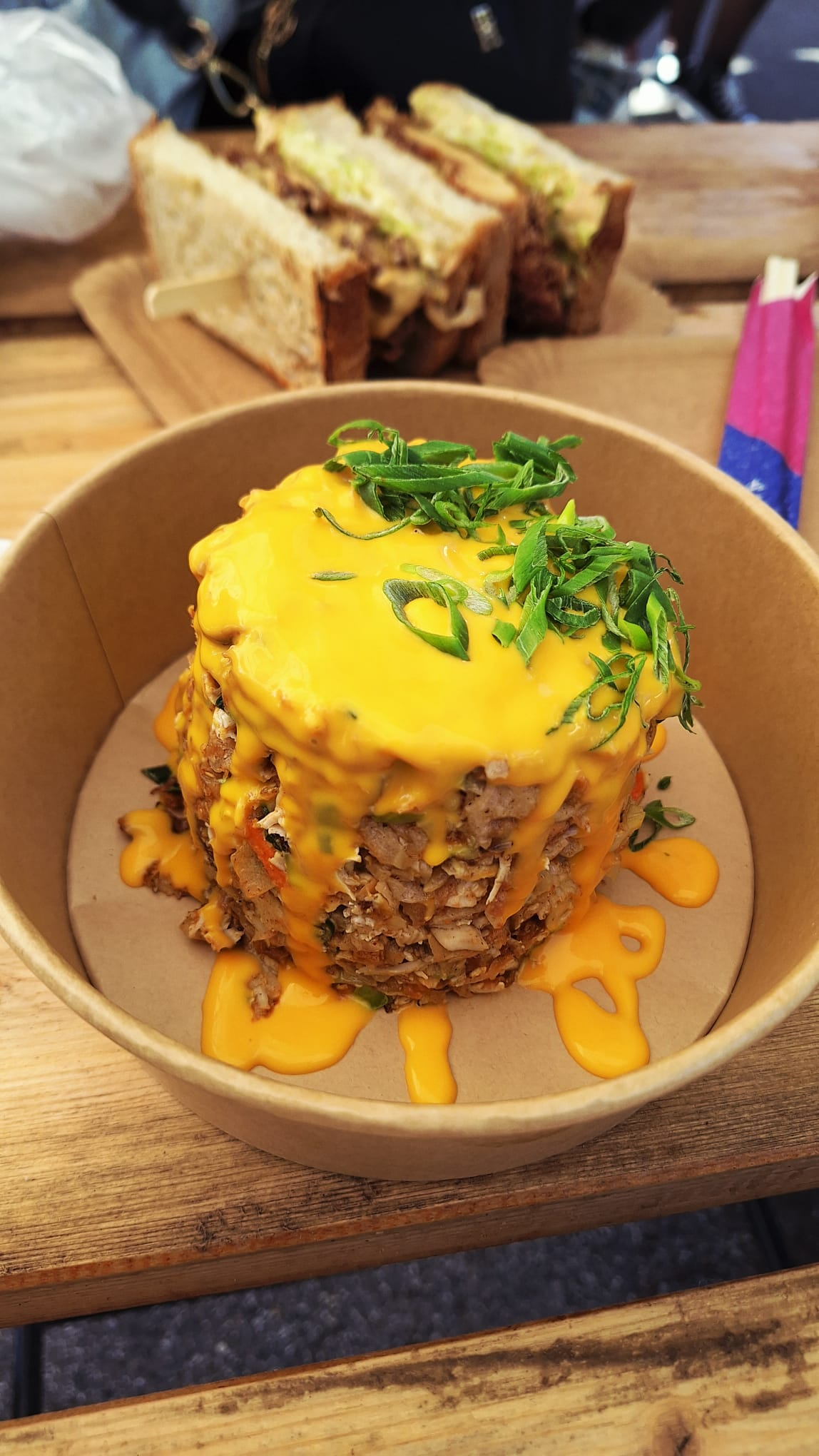
Kottu dish at food festival in Zagreb, Croatia

The word kottu is simplification of the Tamil word koththu. The word koththu means "to chop" in Tamil, referring to its method of preparation, as the ingredients are commonly chopped together using special cleavers, whilst they sauté on a hot griddle. This has been simplified in Tamil and Sinhalese to Kothu or Kottu respectively.

It is generally thought to have originated as street food in the eastern province of Sri Lanka in the 1960s/1970s, as an inexpensive meal for the lower socio-economic classes. The basic roti is made of Gothamba flour, a wheat flour made out of a variety of grains-referring to the white flour, also known as wheat roti or gothamba/godamba roti in Sinhala and "veechu parotta", "veechu roti" in Tamil.

Traditionally, kottu is made from recycling day-old godamba rotis, which are chopped up into small strips and mixed with an assortment of spices, fried vegetables, possibly egg or meat, and topped with chillies and onions. The old roti chunks were castoffs the bakers couldn't sell, and an enterprising lower class took advantage of the inexpensive food source.

== Preparation ==
Kottu, is made up of paratha or wheat flour roti (Godamba roti), which is cut into small pieces or ribbons. Then on a heated iron sheet or griddle, vegetables and onions are fried. Eggs, cooked meat, or fish are added to fried vegetables and heated for a few minutes. Finally, the pieces of cut paratha are added. These are chopped and mixed by repeated pounding using heavy iron blades/spatula, the sound of which is very distinctive and can usually be heard from a long distance. Depending upon what ingredients are used, the variations are vegetable, egg, beef, chicken, mutton, and fish kottu roti. It is often prepared and served as a fast food dish.

== See also ==
- Cuisine of Sri Lanka
