= South Indian parotta =

Sri Lankan / South Indian flatbread

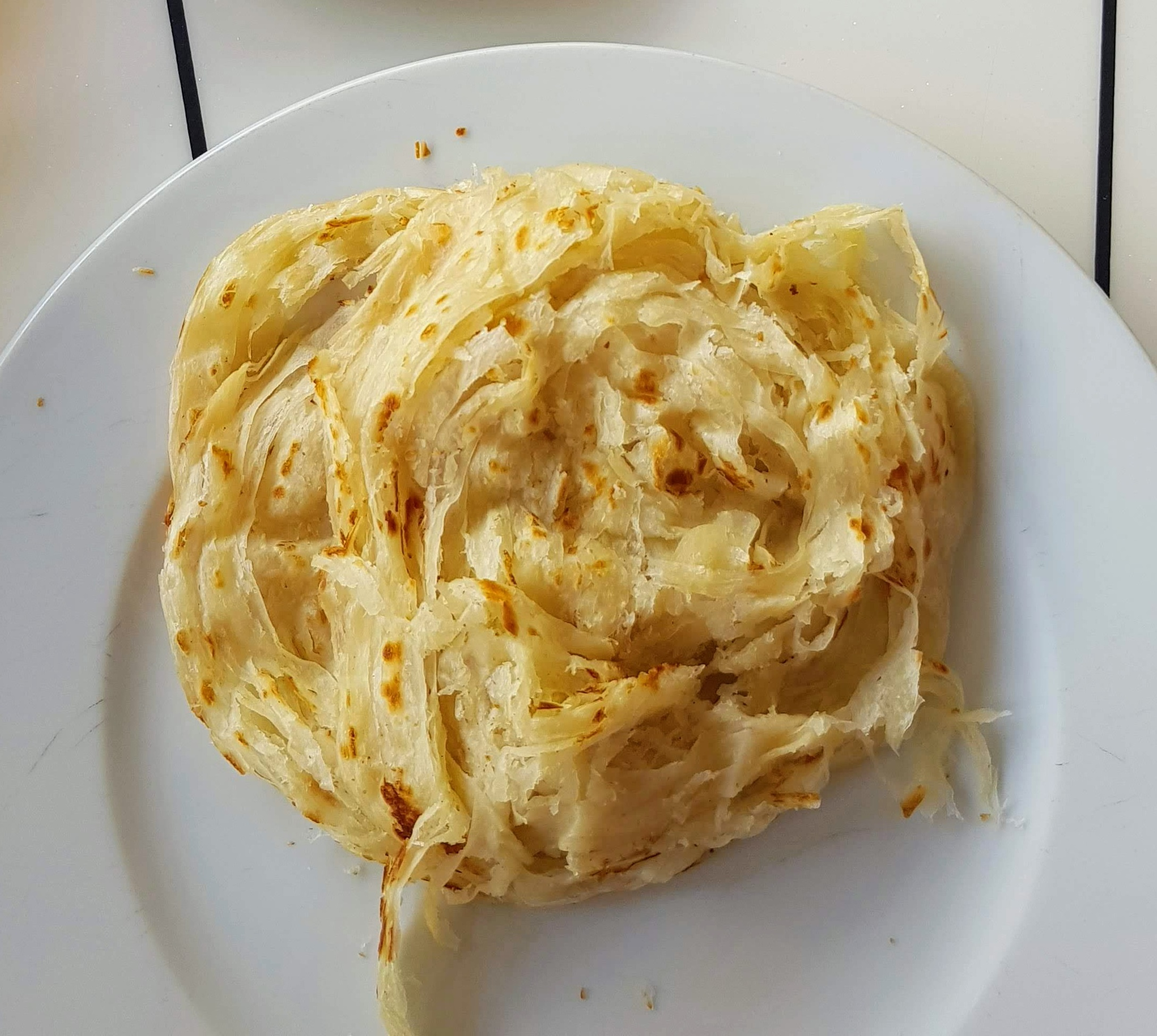
- Malabar parotta
- Alternative names: Porotta, barota
- Type: Flatbread
- Region or state: Tamil Nadu, Kerala, Sri Lanka
- Associated cuisine: Tamil cuisine, Kerala Cuisine, Sri Lankan cuisine
- Main ingredients: Maida, oil, water, salt
- Ingredients generally used: Eggs, sugar
- Variations: Roti canai, kothu parotta
- Similar dishes: Paratha

Parotta (or porotta IPA: [pɐroːʈːɐ, poroːʈːɐ]) is a layered Indian flatbread made from maida (refined flour) and oil. It is soft, flakey, and layered. It is commonly seen in Sri Lanka and in South India, especially in the states of Kerala and Tamil Nadu. It is distinct from the North Indian paratha, which uses atta flour.

There are many types of parotta. The most common is the Malabar parotta (or Kerala parotta), which is kneaded with oil and shaped into a spiral before being rolled out. Veechu parotta, from Tamil Nadu and Sri Lanka, is folded into a square; Ceylon parotta is the same but with a filling. Kothu parotta is torn apart and mixed with other foods. A wide range of dishes may be served with parotta, such as korma, beef fry, or tomato-based salna.

Malabar parotta may have originated after West Asian flatbreads were introduced to the Malabar Coast, while another theory states that it evolved from North Indian parotta. It increased in popularity in the 20th century as wheat propagated in South India. In the present day, parotta is a staple food in South India, served by homes, street vendors, restaurants, and other establishments. Parotta, particularly when paired with beef, is a cultural symbol of Kerala. The Southeast Asian roti canai is a similar dish based on parotta.

== Terminology ==
Parotta is the South Indian equivalent of the Hindi term paratha, referring to a distinct regional equivalent. The spelling barota is used in Tamil Nadu; this corresponds to the Tamil pronunciation, while parotta corresponds to the Malayalam pronunciation.

== Preparation and serving ==
A parotta cook shaping the dough.

Parotta is prepared by kneading maida (refined flour), oil, salt, and water. Sugar and eggs are sometimes included. The ratio of oil to flour is about 5 to 10 percent, while the ratio of salt to flour is about 1.5 to 2.5 percent. The use of maida makes the bread chewy, while fat makes it flakey by shortening the dough.

Balls of the dough are beaten and stretched, which makes it pliable and determines the texture of the parotta. After resting for about 5 minutes, the dough is thinly sheeted, with the use of oil, and folded to form layers. It is then shaped into a spiral and rolled flat. This forms a circle about 15 to 20 centimetres (5.9 to 7.9 in) across and 5 to 7.5 millimetres (0.20 to 0.30 in) thick, or as thin as 2 to 3 millimetres (0.079 to 0.118 in). It is then cooked atop a griddle, using a long spatula to flip it. Under experimental conditions, according to researchers Dasappa Indrani and Gandham Venkateswara Rao, the optimal baking time is 2 minutes at 230 °C (450 °F). (Note: Indrani and Venkateswara Rao also state that the optimal recipe uses about 100 g flour, 60 g water, 15 g oil, 10 g egg, 1 g salt, and 1 g sugar, which is kneaded for 4 minutes, rested for 30 minutes, and stretched to a thickness of 5 millimetres.) After cooking, a parotta may be pulled with both hands to separate the layers.

Preparation of parotta
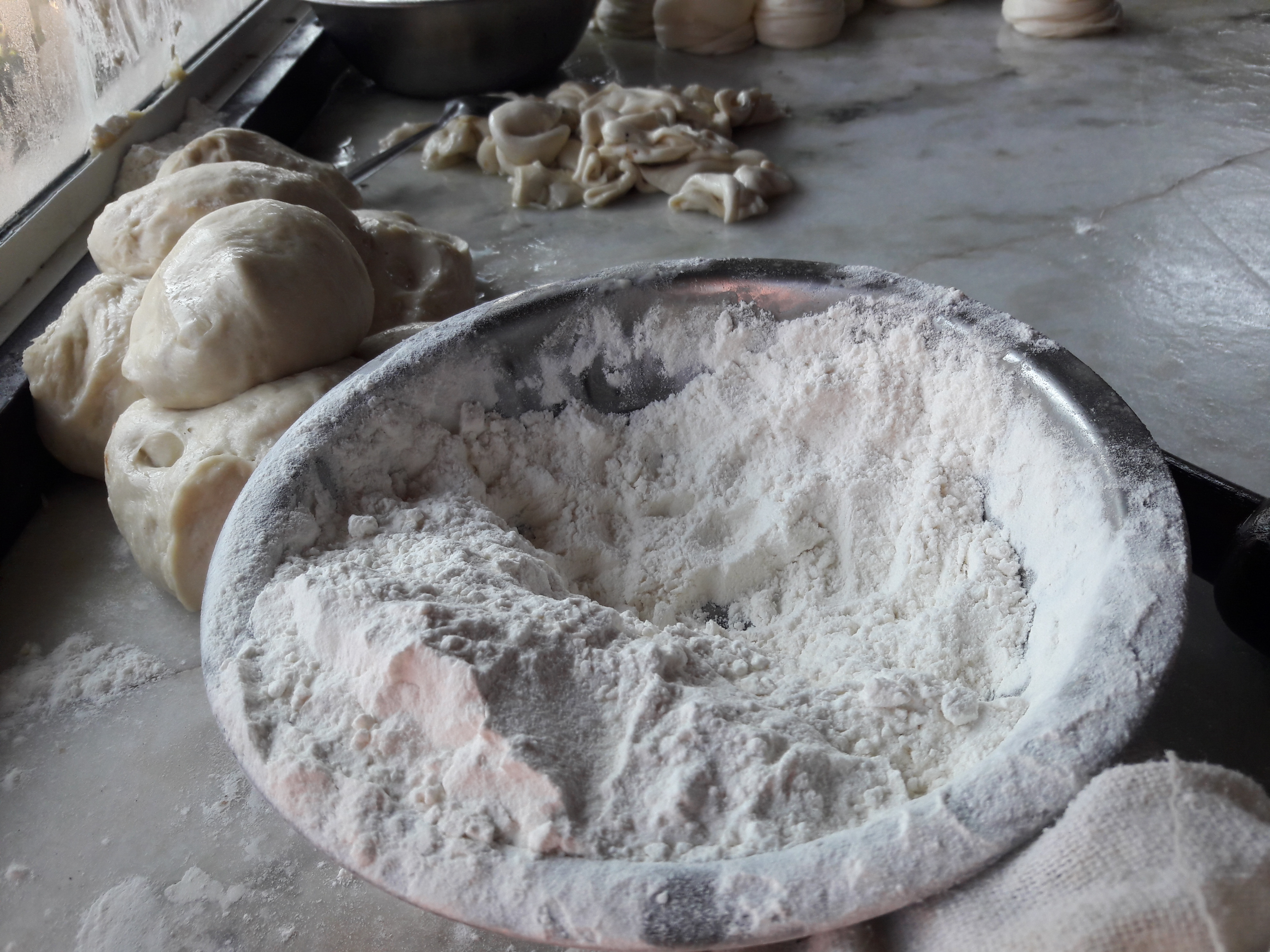
Parotta is made of a dough of maida.

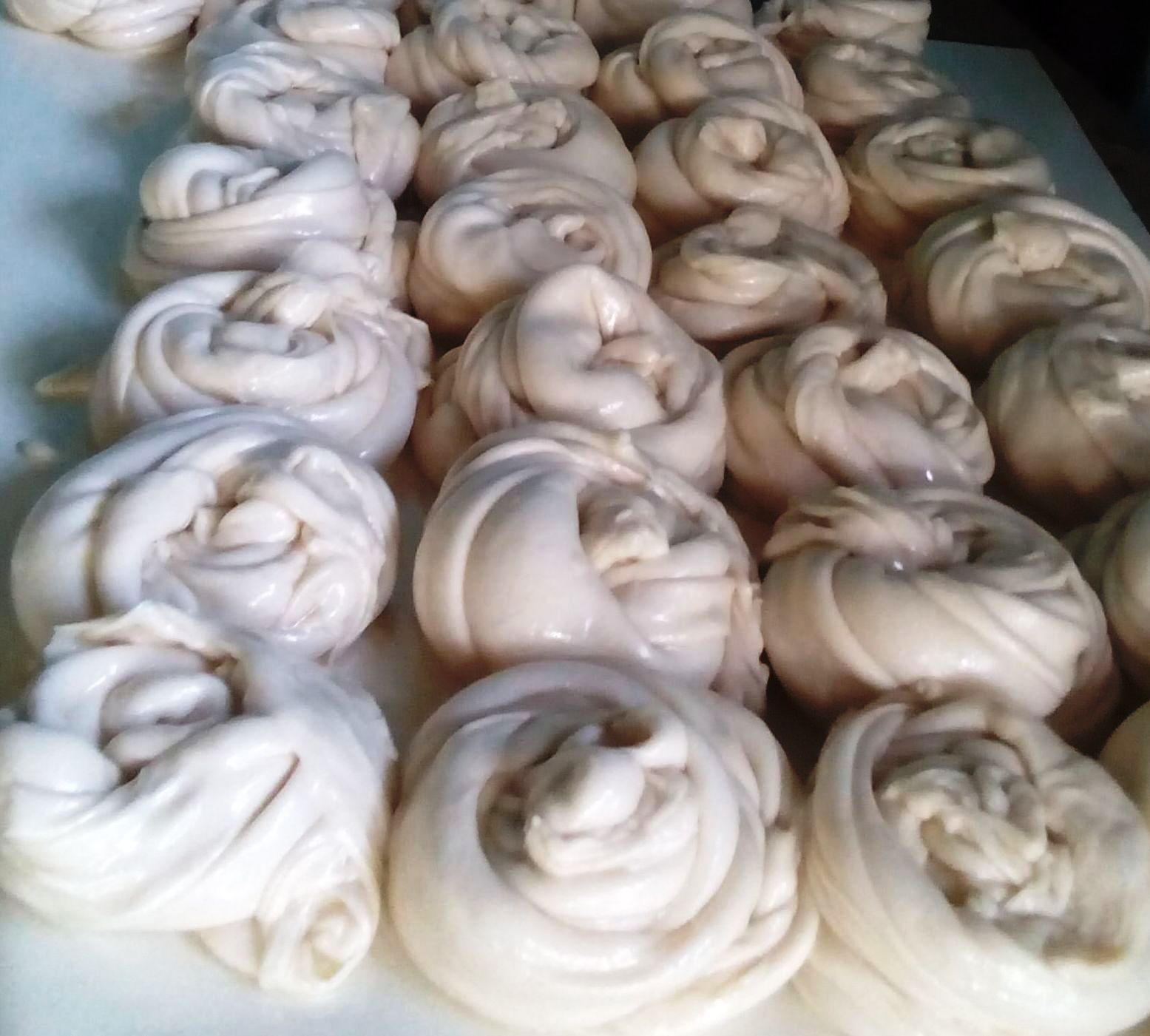
Dough is shaped into spiralled balls, which give parotta its flakey layers.

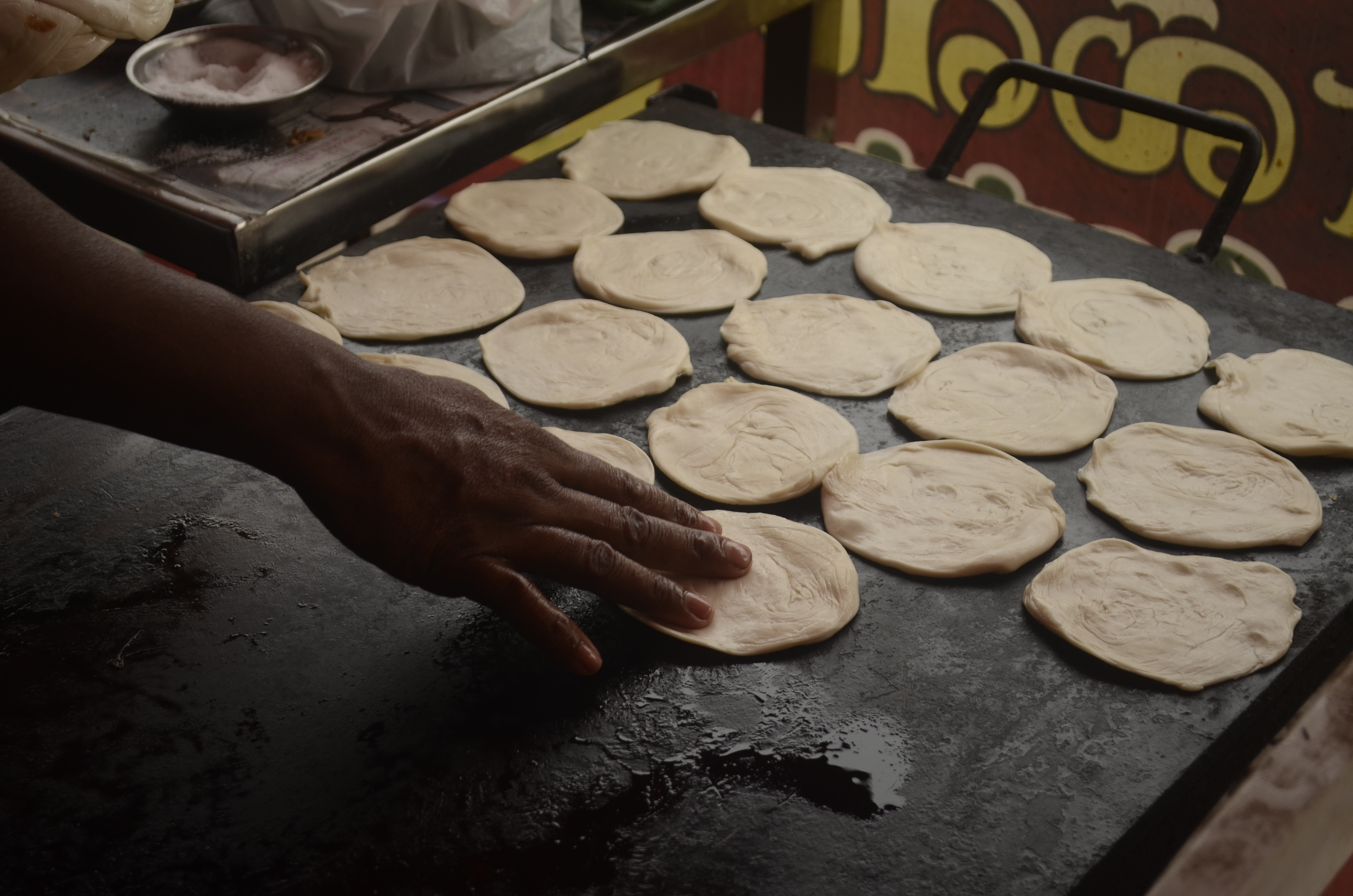
Dough is rolled flat after shaping.

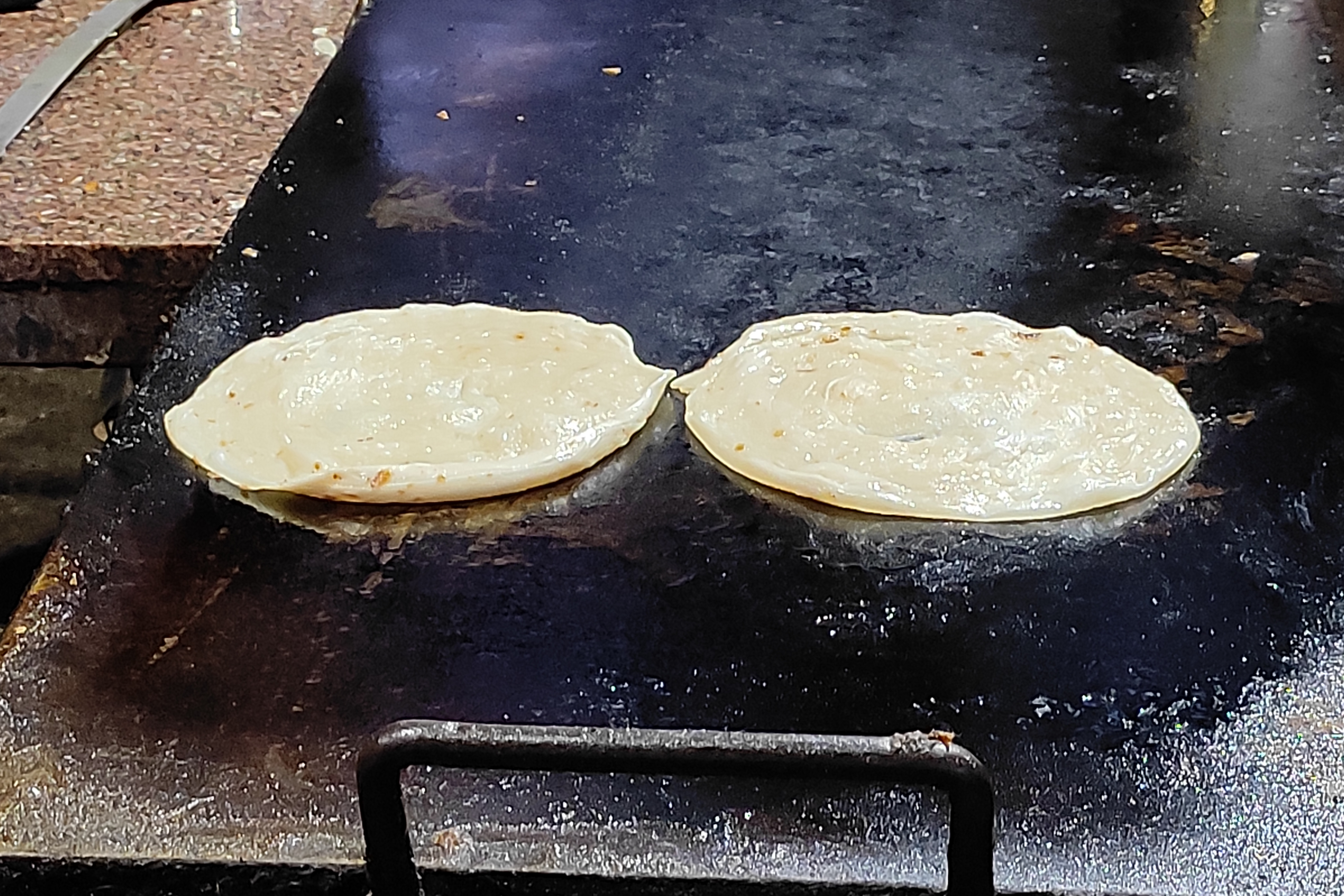
Parotta is cooked on a griddle.

Parotta is thin, flakey, and round, with distinct layers. In appearance, it is cream coloured with some light brown spots. It is soft with a kind of chewy mouthfeel and a pliable handfeel, and it quickly breaks down while chewing.

Parotta is classified as a multi-layered, unleavened flatbread. It differs from other flatbreads as it has many separate layers. South Indian parotta is distinct from North Indian paratha, which is made of atta (whole wheat flour) rather than maida. Though both types use fat in the dough to achieve a layered texture, North Indian paratha is shallow fried, and it usually uses a different technique of folding into layers.

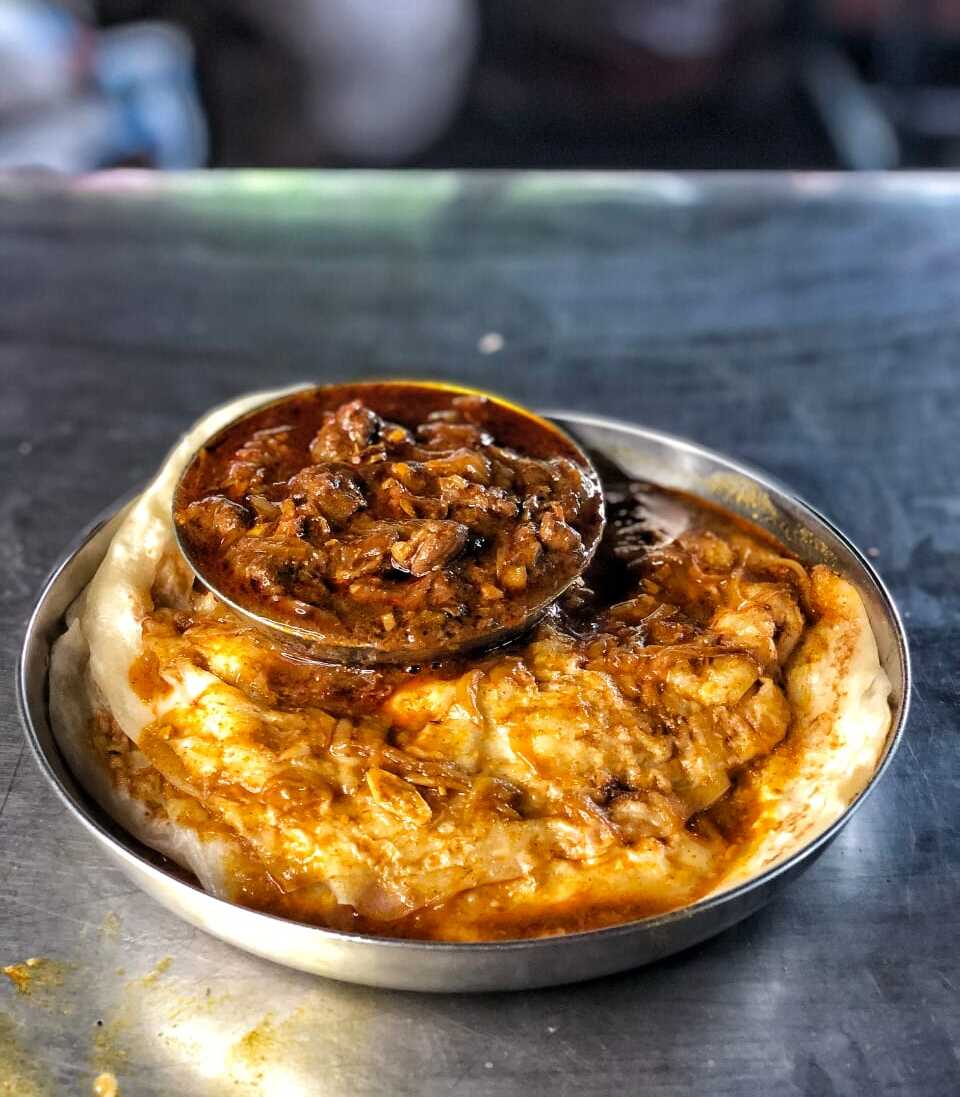
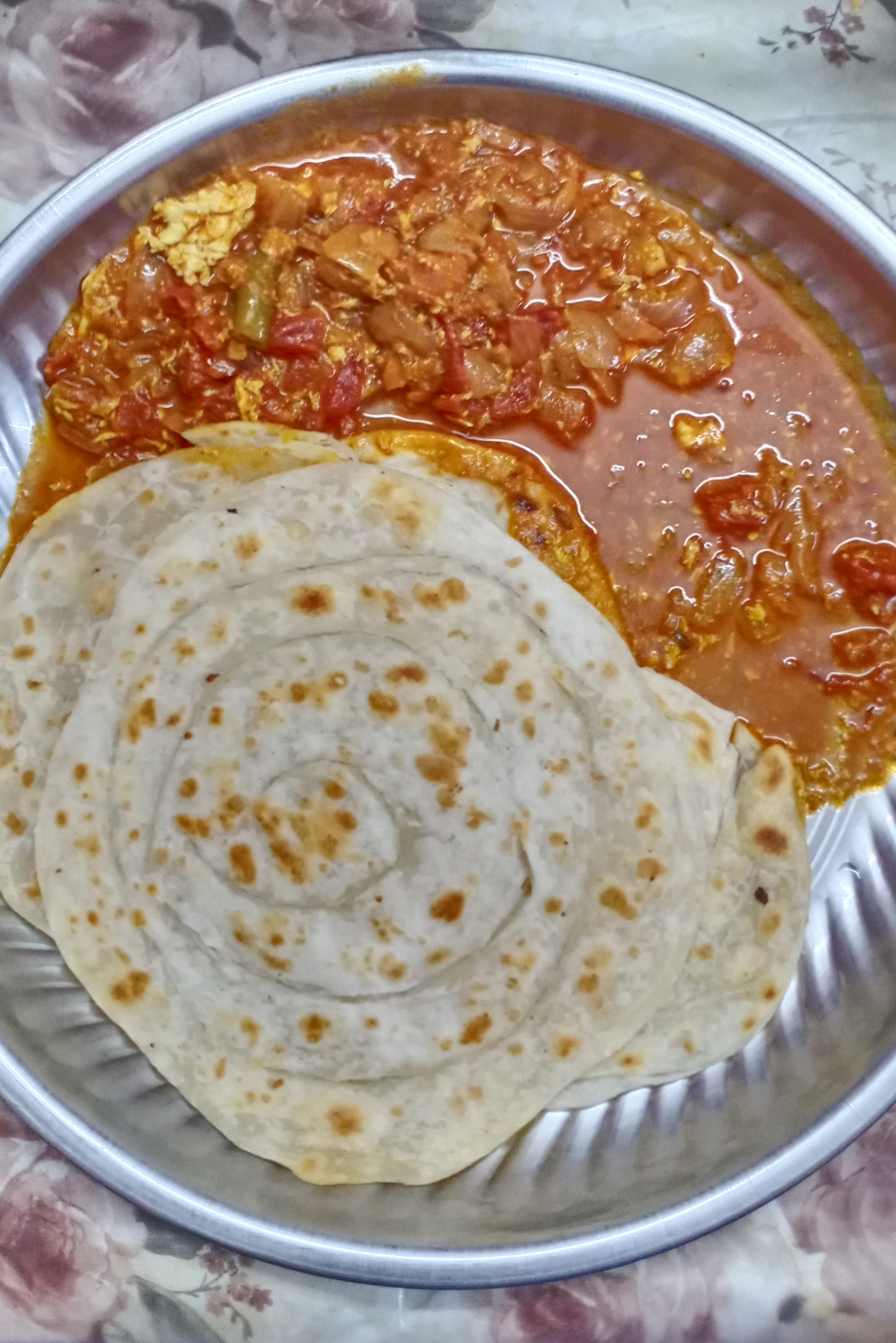
Typical pairings are beef fry (left) in Kerala and salna (right) in southern Tamil Nadu.

Parotta may be eaten at any time of day. It may be served with many dishes, including both vegetarian and non-vegetarian curries or roasts. Korma is a typical pairing in both Kerala and Tamil Nadu. In Kerala, beef fry is a common pairing with Malabar parotta, while other pairings include chicken curry or egg curry, as well as vegetarian dishes such as vegetable korma or kadala curry. Parotta is also commonly paired with salna, a tomato-based gravy that may be cooked with chicken or mutton, or served plain; the latter is known as parotta salna. Salna is the most common pairing with parotta in southern Tamil Nadu, including from restaurants in Madurai. Parotta is often served with hot, sweetened tea. Restaurants often serve parotta on banana leaf plates.

== Variants ==
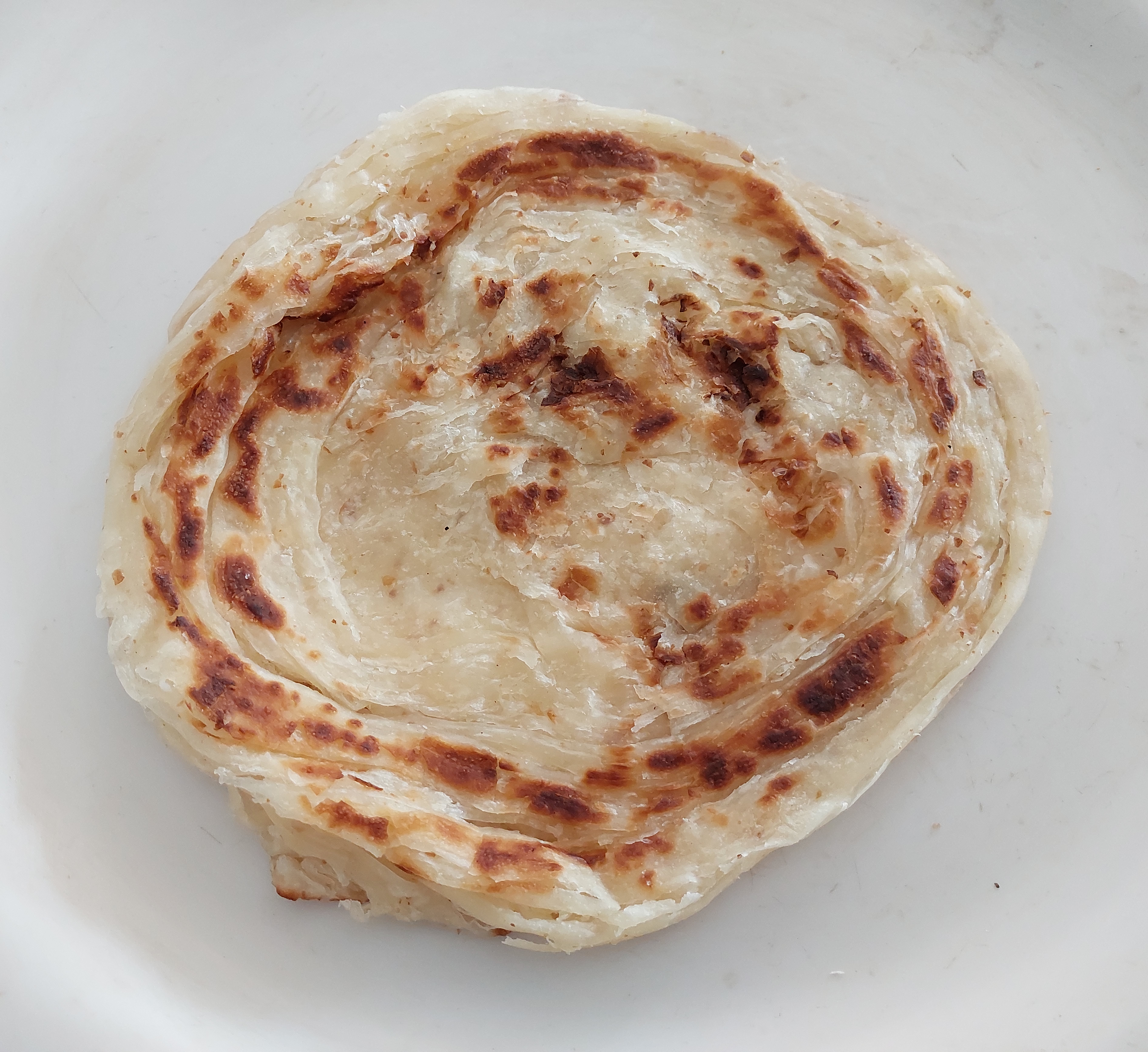
Malabar parotta is very flakey.

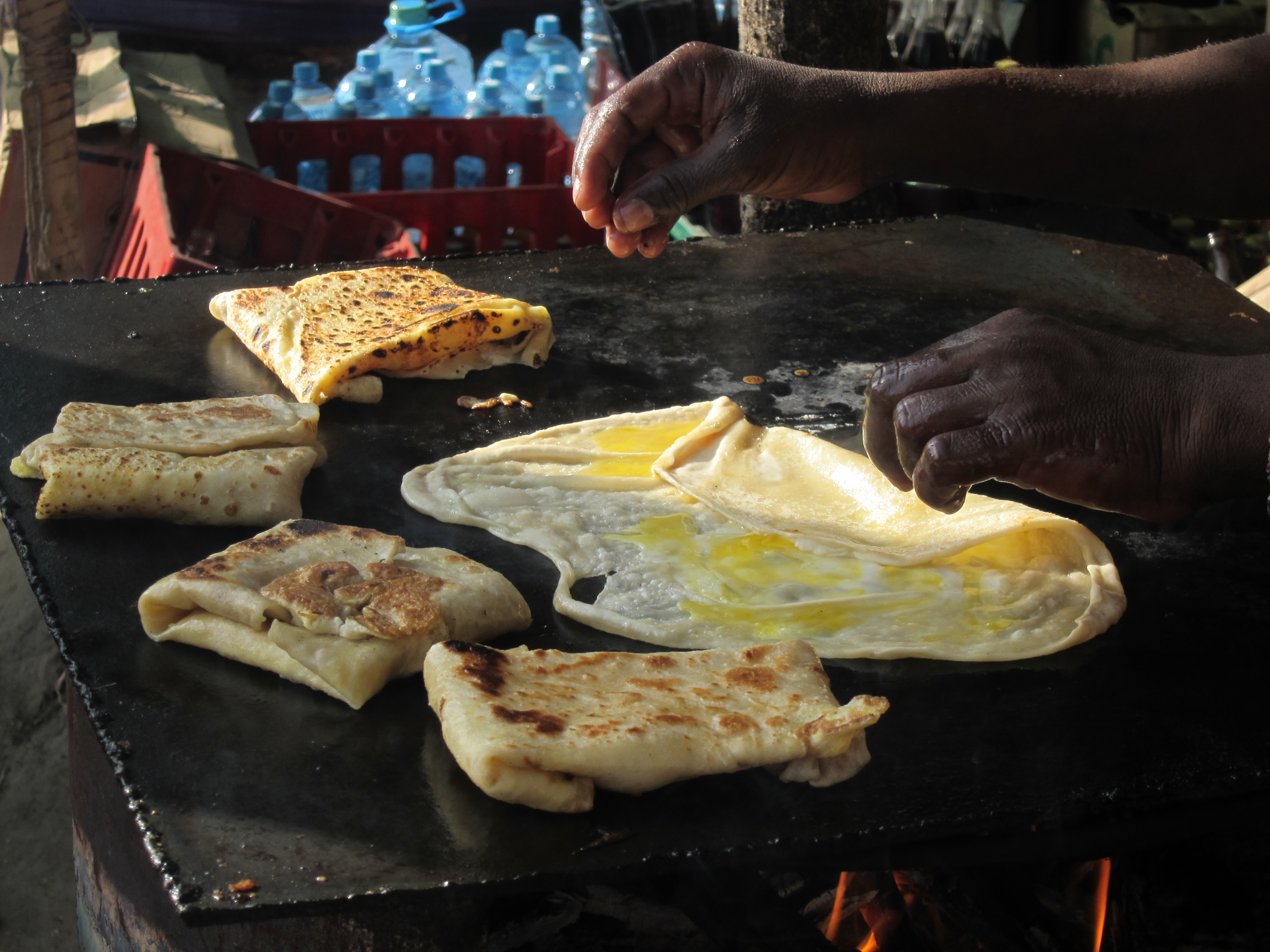
Veechu parotta is folded into squares.

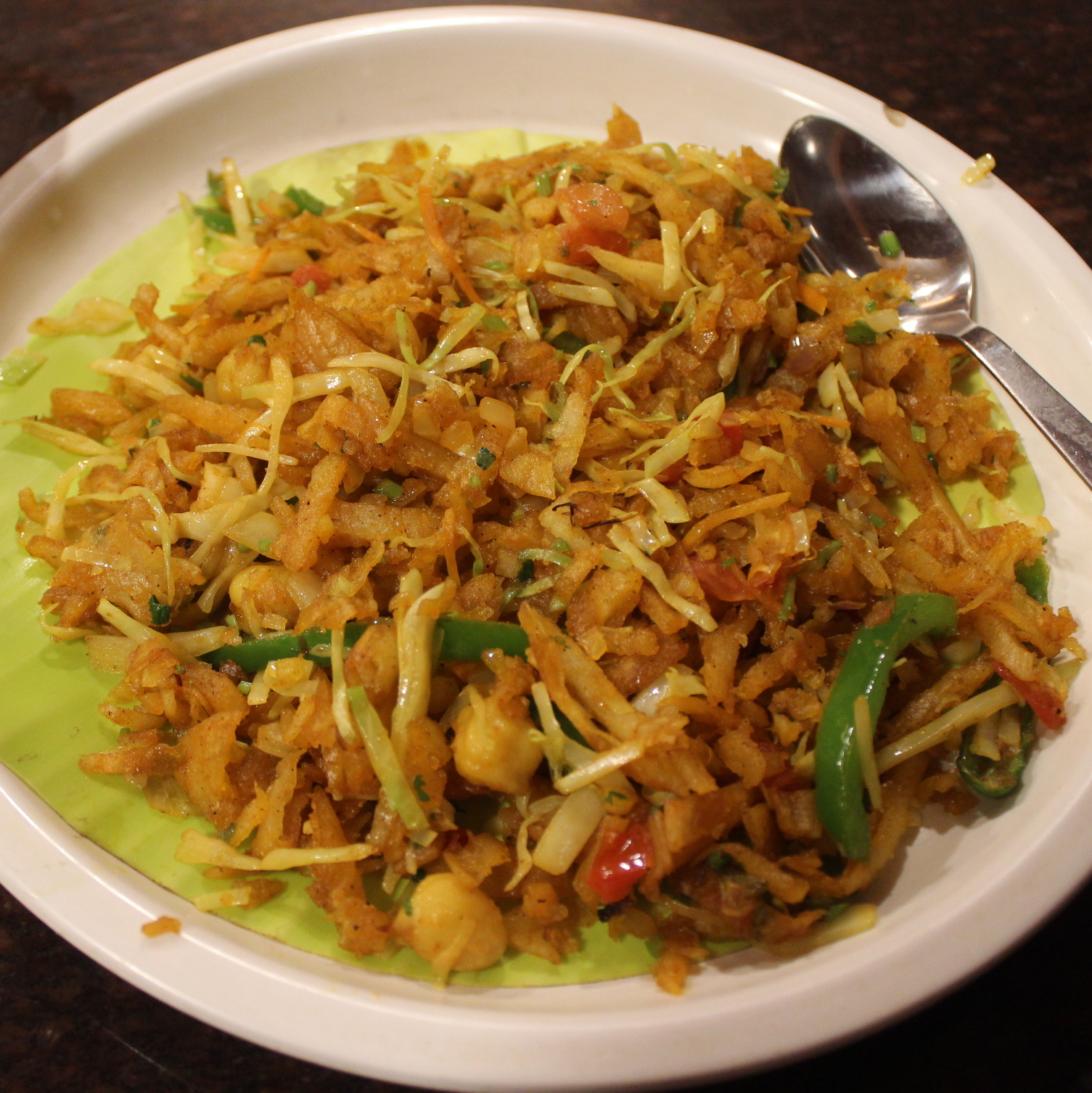
Kothu parotta is torn and mixed with foods.

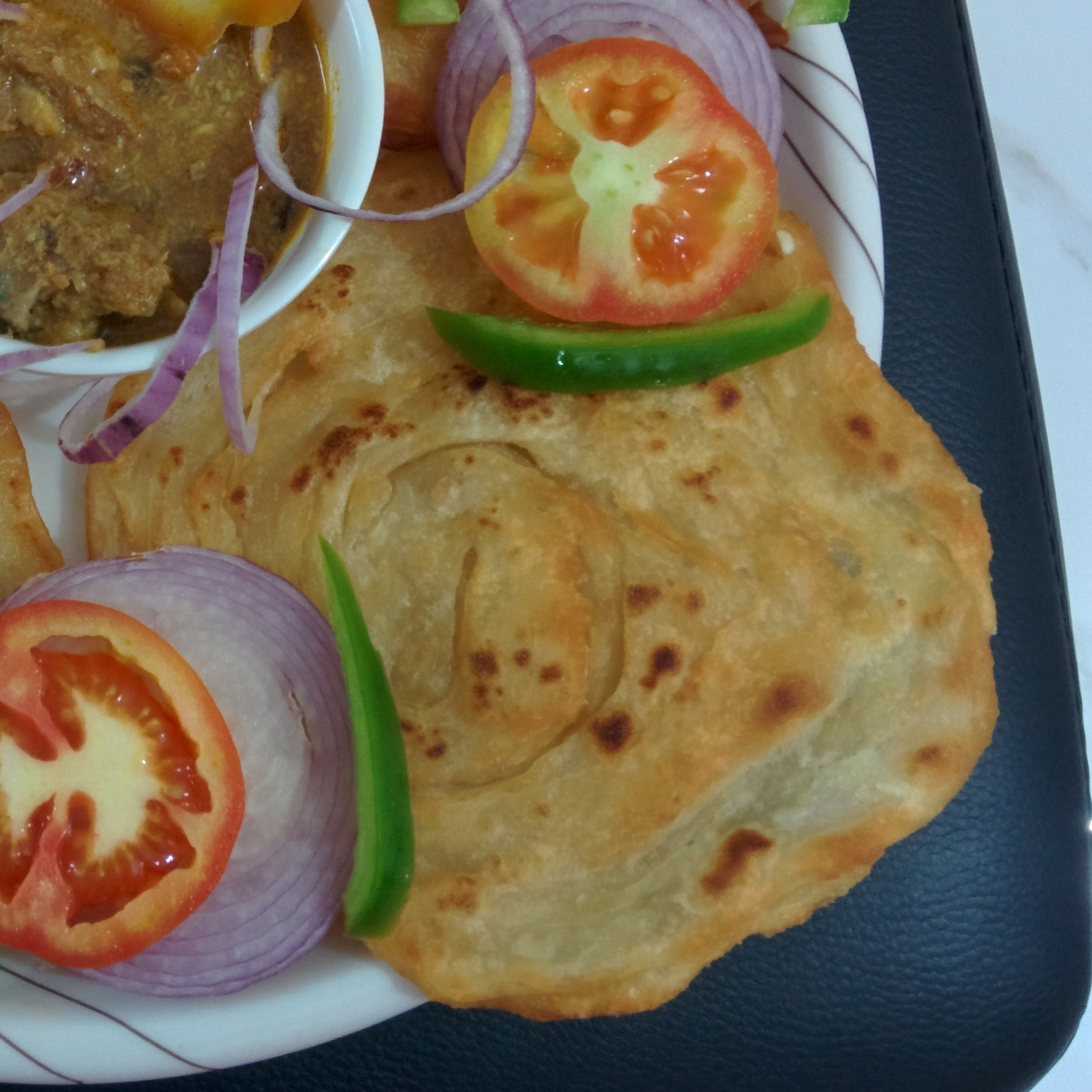
Poricha parotta is deep-fried.

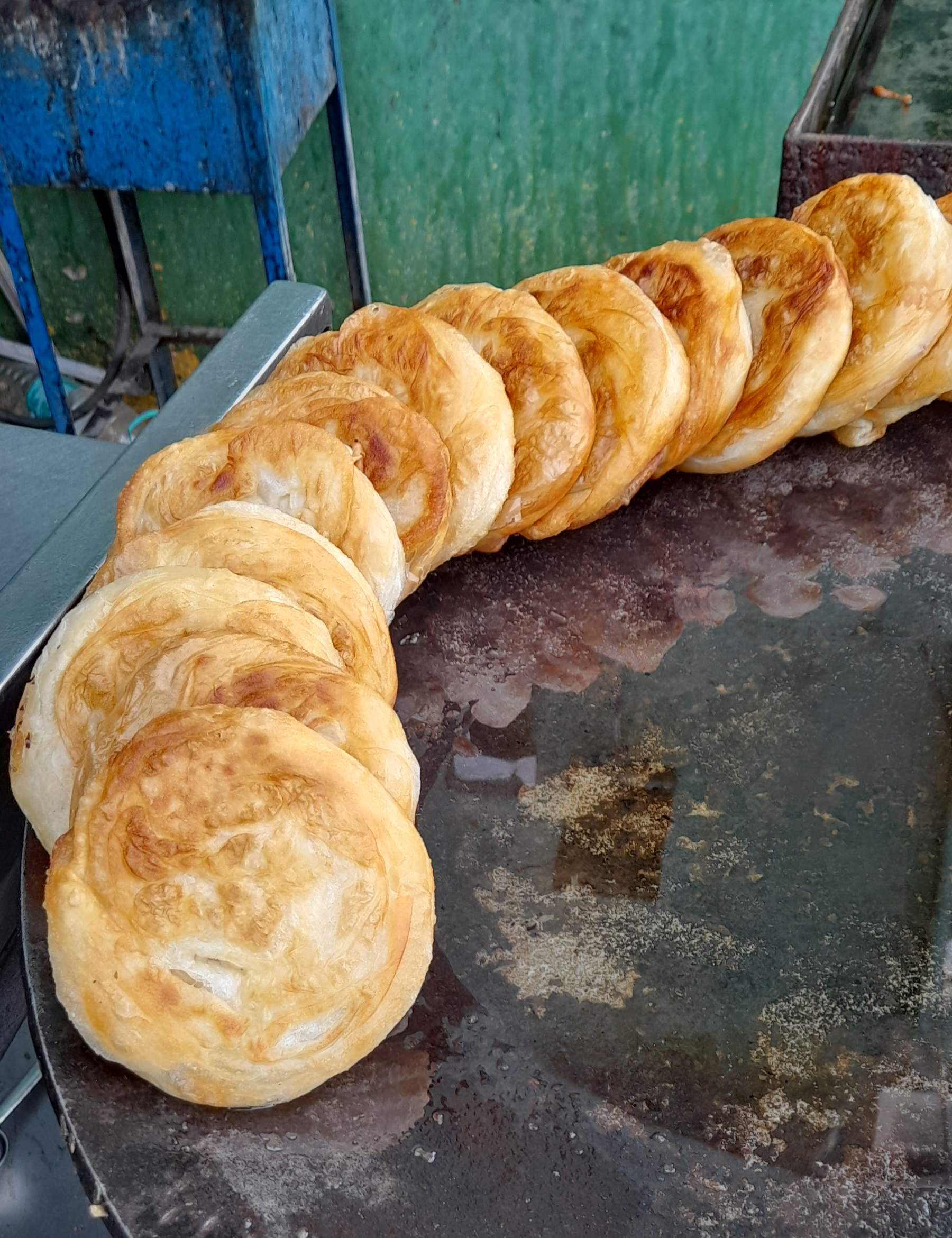
Bun parotta resembles a bun.

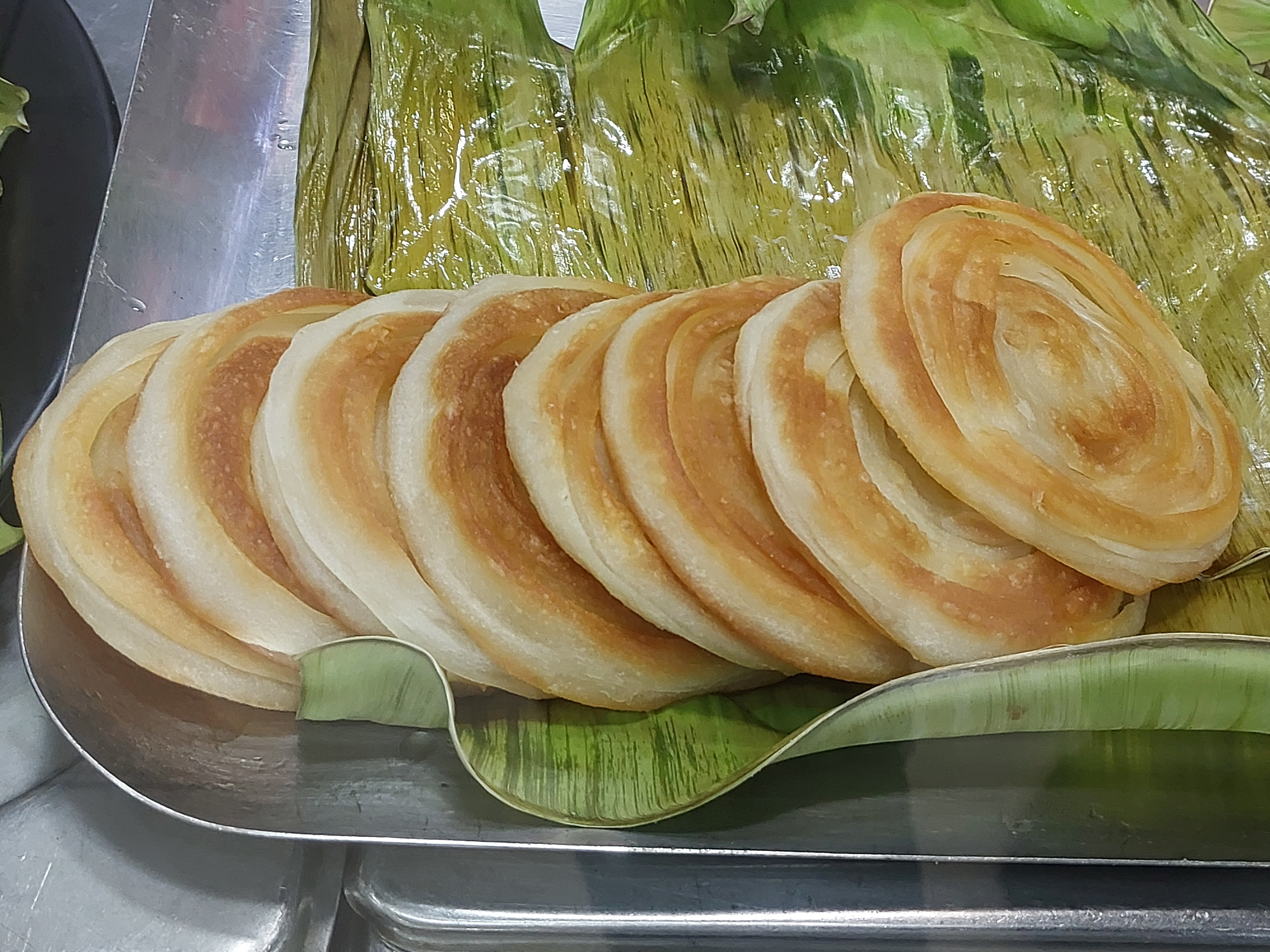
Coin parotta is crispy and bite-sized.

Nool parotta has stringy layers.

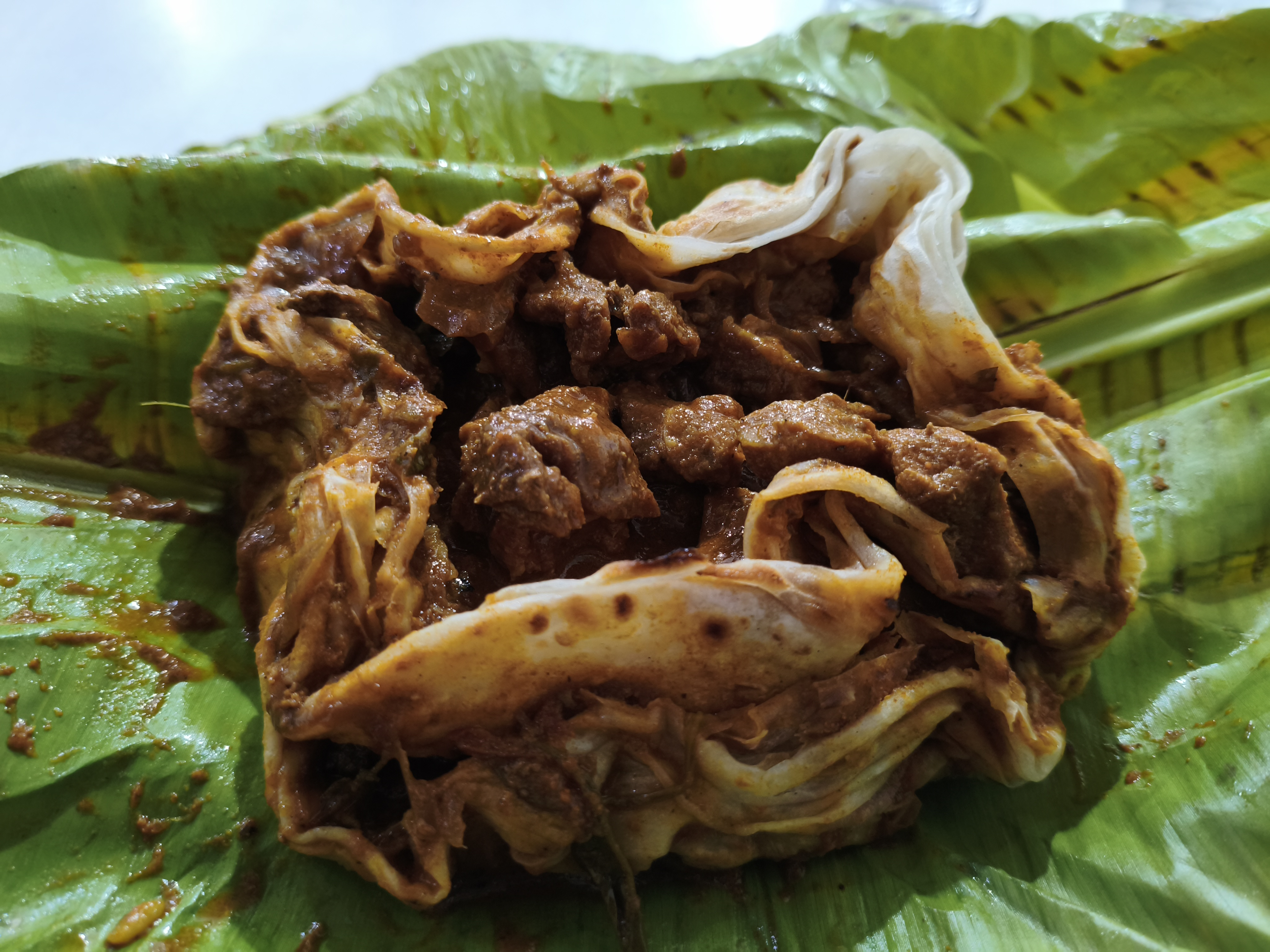
Kizhi parotta is steamed in a banana leaf bag.

The most common parotta in the state of Kerala is the Malabar parotta (also known as Kerala parotta), which has layers formed by kneading oil into the dough and cutting the dough while rolling it. The dough contains flour, milk, and a small amount of sugar, and it usually contains eggs, though eggs may be excluded based on regional differences or individual preferences. Coconut oil may be used. Malabar parotta is fluffy and very flakey. It resembles the North Indian lachha paratha, which is also flakey but has a different preparation method and is made of atta. Parottas served in Madurai, Tamil Nadu, are denser than Malabar parottas.

Veechu parotta, from Sri Lanka and the Indian state of Tamil Nadu, is thin and folded into a square, with more layers than Malabar parotta, formed by tossing the dough. Ceylon parotta is a stuffed version of the veechu parotta with minced meat or a filling of eggs and salna. It originated in Sri Lanka (formerly Ceylon). The Ceylon parotta served at Buhari Restaurant in Chennai, Tamil Nadu, is stuffed with mutton and has an egg-washed crust.

Kothu parotta (transl. minced parotta) is torn into pieces; this may be mixed with meat, eggs, vegetables, and onions. A version of this dish originated in Tamil Nadu, where it is the most common type of parotta, while another version originated in Sri Lanka. It is also eaten in Kerala.

There are several other variants of parotta. Poricha parotta, a version from Virudhunagar, Tamil Nadu, has a hole in the middle and is deep-fried after being cooked on a griddle; it is crispy and resembles a puri. This may be topped with chickpea dal or potato sabzi. The bun parotta, from Madurai, is a cross between a parotta and a bun. It uses a dough with eggs, milk, and sugar, which has a long resting time and is tossed until it is thin, resulting in a layered texture with a crispy exterior and a soft interior. It is eaten by being dipped into curry. Coin parotta is bite-sized—about 2 centimetres (1 in) across—and crispier than a Malabar parotta, using the same ingredients. In Kerala, chatti paal parotta is made of a stack of three parottas with coconut milk and meat, topped with cashews, raisins, and fried onions; this is steamed between two banana leaves. Kizhi parotta consists of parotta and a meat dish steamed in a banana leaf bag. A form of kizhi parotta called thukku parotta is served in the city of Kochi. In Madurai, kizhi parotta is made using bun parotta. Another Keralan version is nool parotta, whose layers are crispy, stringy, and translucent.

Variations of parotta exist beyond India. The Malaysian version, roti canai, closely resembles Malabar parotta, maintaining its spiral shape and flakey texture. In the cuisine of Trinidad and Tobago, a version is known as buss-up-shut.

== Physical properties ==
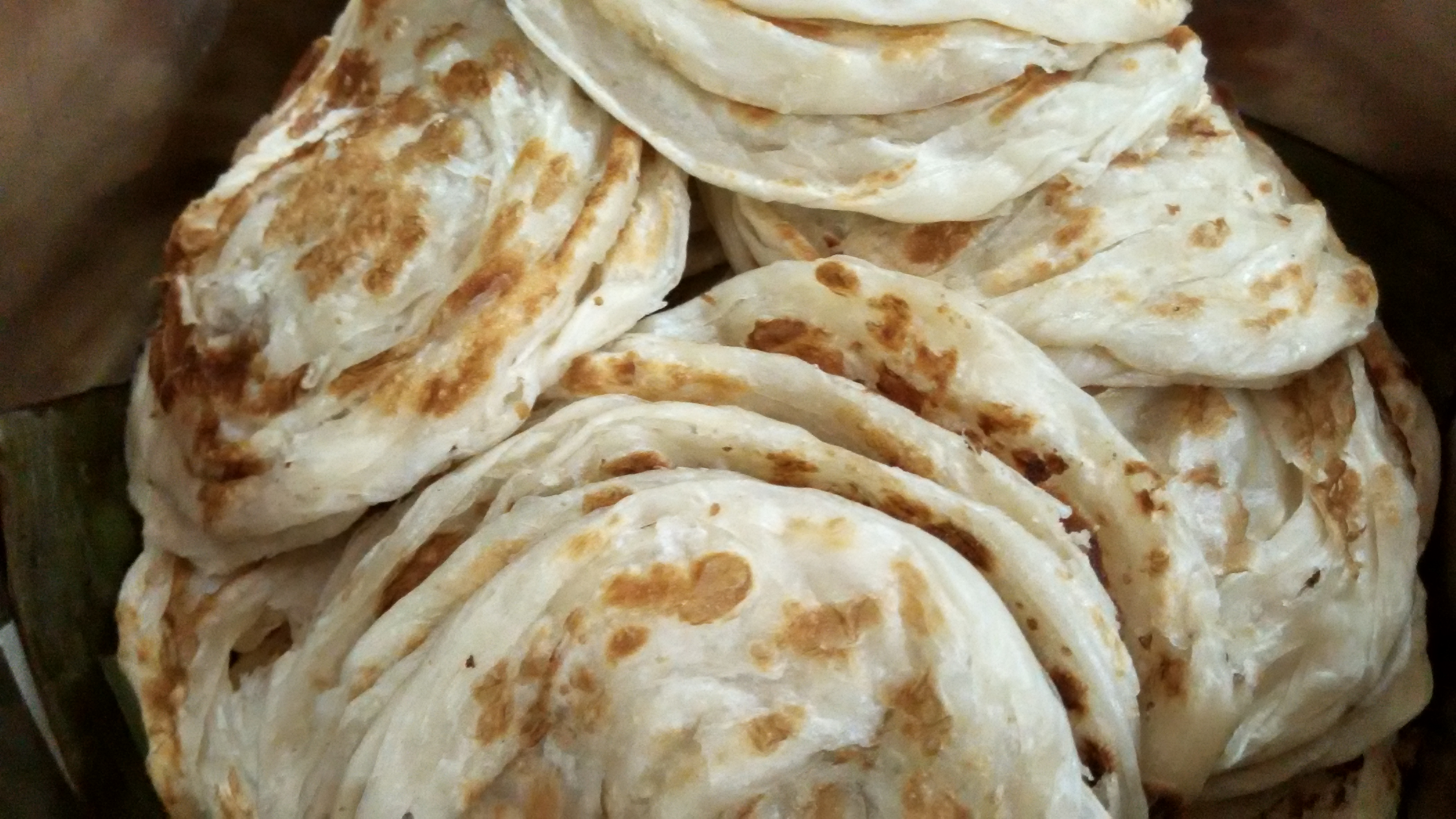
The colour of parotta is associated with gluten in the flour.

Sensory properties of parotta include shear force and compression. Factors correlated with higher shear force include lower resting time, higher baking time, and higher baking temperature, while a higher mixing time is correlated with a thinner parotta. According to Indrani and Venkateswara Rao, increasing the amount of eggs or salt is correlated with higher strength and elasticity of the dough, while increasing the amount of oil is correlated with lower strength and viscosity. Finer flour is correlated with a softer texture. Protein content in the flour is also a large factor in the sensory properties, impacting the chewiness and separation of layers. Gluten content is correlated with the colour, while damaged starch content is correlated with the spotted appearance. The outer layers of parotta experience high distortion of starch compared to the inner layers. Additives may be used to improve properties of parotta. The enzymes xylanase and protease have been shown to strongly improve properties.

Parotta begins to stale after about four hours, after which it becomes less chewy. The addition of hydrocolloids may slow staling. Parotta that has been frozen and thawed largely retains its properties.

== History ==
Culinary anthropologist Kurush Dalal says that the Malabar parotta is likely to have come with Arab traders from West Asia and sailors from Central Asia, both regions with trade links to the Malabar Coast. He notes that Kerala had been trading with West Asia since ancient times, and that wheat is not widely grown in Kerala, indicating a foreign origin for the wheat-based bread. In contrast with these theories, it is commonly believed that paratha spread to Kerala from North India, particularly Punjab. Dalal states that, although there is no conclusive evidence about the origin of parotta, the West Asian origin theory is more likely, as the method of creating layers is foreign to India. Later, South Asian migrants to Malaysia, including indentured labourers from British India, spread parotta to Southeast Asia, where it became known as roti canai—named after the city of Chennai in Tamil Nadu—or roti prata.

Wheat became increasingly common in South India, a predominantly rice-eating region, in the late 20th century, with parotta and other breads being widely consumed. Parotta gained popularity in the Tamil cities of Madurai and Virudhunagar amid famines that limited rice production; initially popular as a cheap food source, it eventually became a prized street food. The oldest parotta stalls in Madurai date to around the 1950s. Kothu parotta spread from Sri Lanka to Madurai, where it became popular as a street food, and later to Kerala. Coin parottas originated in Tuticorin, Tamil Nadu, in the 1980s, after the Ceylon parotta was introduced by Ceylonese migrant workers who were employed at the Tuticorin Port. The bun parotta is claimed to have been invented by the restaurant Madurai Bun Parotta Kadai in 1999. Nool parotta was popularised by chef Suresh Pillai, who has posted about the dish on Instagram Reels and received millions of views.

Parotta from restaurants became highly demanded after the end of the COVID-19 lockdown in Kerala in 2020. The same year, Kerala Authority for Advance Ruling decided that frozen parotta was subject to a higher tax rate than ready-to-eat roti as a frozen product did not qualify as ready-to-eat. Some residents of Kerala condemned the decision, arguing that it unfairly targeted a regional food, with the hashtag #handsofparotta becoming a trend.

== Prevalence ==
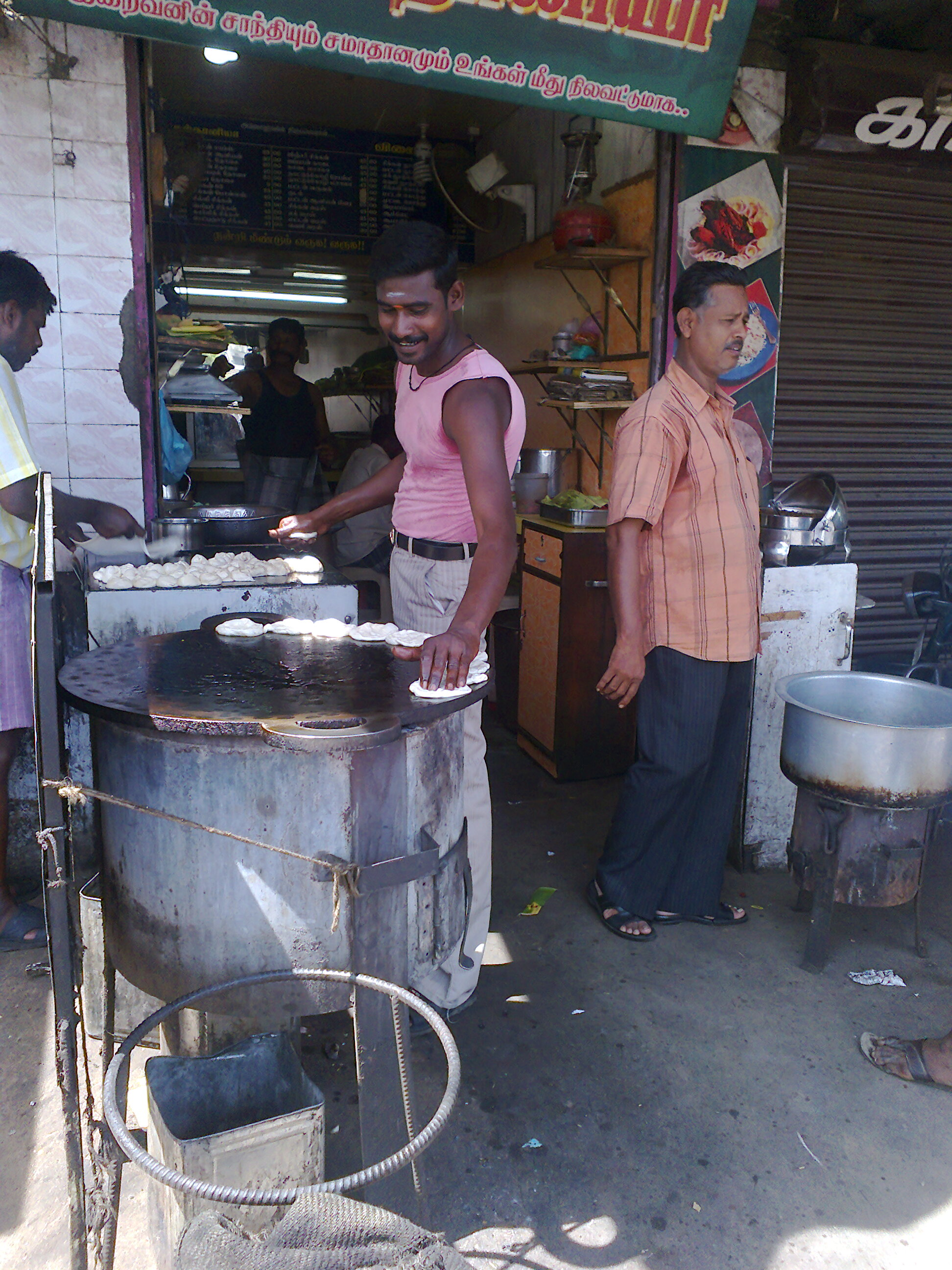
Parotta is commonly served as street food.

Parotta is a staple food of South India, strongly associated with both Kerala cuisine and Tamil cuisine. The Keralan version, originating in the Malabar region of northern Kerala, is a staple across the state. Over half of the wheat flour produced in South India is used for parotta. Variants of the bread are common in the cuisines of Sri Lanka, Malaysia, and Singapore.

Parotta is a popular street food in Kerala and other parts of South India. Parotta is served by informal establishments in Kerala known as thattukadas, while kothu parotta is popular in Madurai, from vendors known as roattu kadai. Parottas are also available at tea houses, toddy shops in the state. Parotta may also be homemade. Frozen parottas and frozen dough are also available.

Parotta is also served at restaurants. Some establishments employ cooks dedicated entirely to making parottas—known in Madurai as parotta masters—who develop specific stretching and kneading methods. As of 2020, the average restaurant in Kerala serves approximately 100 parottas per day, with some serving over 1,000. As of 2022, parotta is the most popular dish ordered from the delivery app Swiggy in Kerala. The price of parotta in Madurai ranges from 10 to 250 rupees. Restaurants in Madurai largely serve parotta with meat, and the most common variants are bun parotta and kizhi parotta. Parotta is also made by Tamil chefs in China, where it is known as indu sui bing (lit. 'Indian fly bread') and served as a dessert with various flavours.

Parotta is popularly considered a state symbol of Kerala, nicknamed "Kerala's national dish". The BBC featured the food in a commemoration of Kerala Day in 2023. Parotta with beef fry is a symbol of the Keralan identity, representing the diverse influences on its culture. Parotta with salna is a culturally significant dish in Madurai. The dish is depicted in several films from the city; for example, the comedian Soori is nicknamed "Parotta Soori" after a scene in his film Vennila Kabadi Kuzhu.

== See also ==
- List of Indian breads
- Scallion pancake – a similar flatbread from China with similar West Asian origins
